= Dance Party (album) =

Studio album by Martha and the Vandellas
- Released: April 12, 1965
- Recorded: 1964
- Studio: Hitsville U.S.A. (Studio A)
- Genre: Soul, dance, pop, R&B
- Length: 29:44
- Label: Gordy
- Producer: Holland–Dozier–Holland; William "Mickey" Stevenson

Martha and the Vandellas chronology
Heat Wave (1963)	Dance Party (1965)	Greatest Hits (1966)

Singles from Dance Party
- 1. "Dancing in the Street / There He Is (At My Door)" Released: July 31, 1964; 2. "Wild One / Dancing Slow" Released: November 13, 1964; 3. "Nowhere to Run / Motoring" Released: February 5, 1965

Professional ratings
Review scores
Source	Rating
Allmusic	4.5/5 stars

Dance Party is a 1965 studio album released by American Motown and soul girl group Martha and the Vandellas on the Gordy (Motown) label. The album was the group's third and, much like The Miracles' Mickey's Monkey album, mainly consisted of dance tunes. The singles featured on the album were their 1964 landmark single, "Dancing in the Street", their follow-up smash, "Wild One", and the hit "Nowhere to Run" and its b-side, "Motoring". The album was mostly produced by William "Mickey" Stevenson with several nods from Holland–Dozier–Holland. The album became their second charting album on the Billboard 200. Despite scoring three top 40 singles on the project, the album only went as high as number 139, where it peaked on May 29, 1965, staying on the chart for just three weeks, two weeks lower than their 1963 album, Heat Wave.

== Track listing ==
Side one
No.	Title	Writer(s)	Length
1.	"Dancing in the Street"	Marvin Gaye; Ivy Jo Hunter; William "Mickey" Stevenson	2:37
2.	"Dancing Slow"	Hunter; Stevenson; William Weatherspoon	2:12
3.	"Wild One"	Hunter; Stevenson	2:41
4.	"Nowhere to Run"	Holland–Dozier–Holland	2:55
5.	"Nobody'll Care"	Hunter; Stevenson; Stevie Wonder	2:19
6.	"There He Is (At My Door)"	Lamont Dozier; Eddie Holland; Freddie Gorman	2:30

Side two
No.	Title	Writer(s)	Length
1.	"Mobile Lil the Dancing Witch"	Hunter; Stevenson	2:10
2.	"Dance Party"	Hunter; Stevenson	2:18
3.	"Motoring"	Hunter; Stevenson; Phil Jones	2:44
4.	"The Jerk"	Hunter; Stevenson	2:13
5.	"Mickey's Monkey"	Holland–Dozier–Holland	2:33
6.	"Hitch Hike"	Gaye; Stevenson; Clarence Paul	2:32

== Personnel ==
- Martha Reeves - lead vocals; backing vocals on "There He Is (At My Door)" and "Hitch Hike"
- Rosalind Ashford - backing vocals
- Betty Kelly - backing vocals (except "There He Is (At My Door)")
- Annette Beard - backing vocals on "Hitch Hike" and "There He Is (At My Door)"
- Mickey Stevenson - backing vocals (except on "Dancing Slow", "Nowhere to Run", "There He Is (At My Door)", "Mickey's Monkey" and "Hitch Hike")
- Ivy Jo Hunter - backing vocals (except on "Dancing Slow", "Nowhere to Run", "There He Is (At My Door)", "Mickey's Monkey" and "Hitch Hike"); tire iron on "Dancing in the Street"; percussion on "Wild One"; snow chains on "Nowhere to Run"
- The Funk Brothers - instrumentation:
  - James Jamerson - bass on "Dancing in the Street", "Wild One", "Nowhere to Run", and "Hitch Hike"
  - Marvin Gaye - drums on "Dancing in the Street" and "Hitch Hike"; piano on "Hitch Hike"
  - Benny Benjamin - drums on "Wild One" and "Nowhere to Run"
  - Earl Van Dyke - piano on "Nowhere to Run" and "Hitch Hike"
  - Jack Ashford - tambourine on "Dancing in the Street", "Wild One", "Nowhere to Run", and "Hitch Hike"
  - Joe Messina - guitar on "Dancing in the Street" and "Hitch Hike"
  - Eddie Willis - guitar on "Dancing in the Street", "Wild One", "Nowhere to Run", and "Hitch Hike"
  - Robert White - guitar on "Dancing in the Street", "Wild One", "Nowhere to Run", and "Hitch Hike"
  - Russ Conway - trumpet on "Dancing in the Street", "Wild One" and "Nowhere to Run"
  - Herbert Williams - trumpet on "Dancing in the Street", "Wild One" and "Nowhere to Run"
  - George Bohanon - trombone on "Dancing in the Street", "Wild One" and "Nowhere to Run"
  - Paul Riser - trombone on "Dancing in the Street", "Wild One" and "Nowhere to Run"
  - Henry Cosby - tenor saxophone on "Dancing in the Street", "Wild One", "Nowhere to Run", and "Hitch Hike"
  - Thomas "Beans" Bowles - baritone saxophone on "Dancing in the Street"; flute on "Hitch Hike"
  - Mike Terry - baritone saxophone on "Wild One", "Nowhere to Run", and "Hitch Hike"
