= Come and Get These Memories (album) =

Studio album by Martha and the Vandellas
- Released: June 28, 1963
- Recorded: 1962 – 1963
- Studio: Hitsville U.S.A. (Studio A)
- Genre: Soul
- Length: 30:21
- Label: Gordy; G902
- Producer: Holland–Dozier–Holland; William "Mickey" Stevenson

Martha and the Vandellas chronology
Come and Get These Memories (1963)	Heat Wave (1963)

Singles from Come and Get These Memories
- 1. "I'll Have to Let Him Go / My Baby Won't Come Back" Released: September 27, 1962; 2. "Come and Get These Memories / Jealous Lover" Released: February 22, 1963

Professional ratings
Review scores
Source	Rating
AllMusic	3/5 stars
The Encyclopedia of Popular Music	3/5 stars
New Record Mirror	3/5 stars

Come and Get These Memories is the debut album by the American girl group Martha and the Vandellas, released in 1963. Put out by Gordy after the success of the trio's hit of the same name, the album also contains the group's debut single, "I'll Have to Let Him Go", which was originally intended for Mary Wells, and "A Love Like Yours (Don't Come Knocking Everyday)". Most of the album was produced by Holland–Dozier–Holland and William "Mickey" Stevenson.

Former member Gloria Williams originally sang lead on the song "There He Is (At My Door)" and Martha Reeves later revealed in her autobiography that the song was re-recorded after Williams left with her on lead vocals. Williams backing vocals on "I'll Have to Let Him Go" is her only album appearance. This album also includes a cover version of "Tears on My Pillow" by Little Anthony and the Imperials, and standards like "Moments to Remember".

== Track listing ==
Side one
No.	Title	Writer(s)	Length
1.	"Come and Get These Memories"	Holland–Dozier–Holland	2:26
2.	"Can't Get Used to Losing You"	Doc Pomus; Mort Shuman	2:03
3.	"Moments (To Remember)"	Richard Berry	2:32
4.	"This Is When I Need You Most"	Holland–Dozier–Holland	2:22
5.	"A Love Like Yours (Don't Come Knocking Everyday)"	Holland–Dozier–Holland	2:26
6.	"Tears on My Pillow"	Sylvester Bradford; Al Lewis	2:50

Side two
No.	Title	Writer(s)	Length
1.	"To Think You Would Hurt Me"	Brian Holland; Robert Gordy	2:50
2.	"There He Is (At My Door)"	Eddie Holland; Freddie Gorman	2:30
3.	"I'll Have to Let Him Go"	William "Mickey" Stevenson	2:47
4.	"Give Him Up"	Wm. Robinson	2:30
5.	"Jealous Lover"	Holland–Dozier–Holland	2:37
6.	"Old Love (Let's Try It Again)"	Holland–Dozier–Holland	2:28

== Personnel ==
- Martha Reeves – lead vocals; backing vocals on "There He Is (At My Door)"
- Rosalind Ashford – backing vocals
- Annette Beard – backing vocals
- Gloria Williams – backing vocals on "I'll Have to Let Him Go"
- Brian Holland – backing vocals on "A Love Like Yours (Don't Come Knocking Everyday)"
- The Andantes – backing vocals on "To Think You Would Hurt Me"
- The Love-Tones – backing vocals on "To Think You Would Hurt Me"
- Raynoma Liles Gordy – organ on "I'll Have to Let Him Go"
- Other instrumentation by the Funk Brothers:
  - Joe Hunter – piano on "I'll Have to Let Him Go" and "Come and Get These Memories"
  - Earl Van Dyke – electric piano on "Come and Get These Memories"
  - James Jamerson – bass on "I'll Have to Let Him Go" and "Come and Get These Memories"
  - Benny Benjamin – drums on "I'll Have to Let Him Go" and "Come and Get These Memories"
  - Eddie Willis – guitar on "I'll Have to Let Him Go" and "Come and Get these Memories"
  - Robert White – guitar on "Come and Get These Memories"
  - Andrew "Mike" Terry – baritone saxophone on "I'll Have to Let Him Go" and "Come and Get These Memories"
