= Heat Wave (Martha and the Vandellas album) =

Studio album by Martha and the Vandellas
- Released: September 30, 1963
- Recorded: 1963
- Studio: Hitsville U.S.A. (Studio A)
- Genre: Soul, pop, R&B
- Length: 27:13
- Label: Gordy (Motown)
- Producer: Holland–Dozier–Holland; William "Mickey" Stevenson

Martha and the Vandellas chronology
Come and Get These Memories (1963)	Heat Wave (1963)	Dance Party (1965)

Singles from Heat Wave
- 1. "Heat Wave / A Love Like Yours (Don't Come Knocking Everyday)" Released: July 10, 1963

Professional ratings
Review scores
Source	Rating
AllMusic	3/5 stars

Heat Wave is the second studio album released by American Motown girl group Martha and the Vandellas. Released in 1963 on Motown's Gordy imprint, intended to capitalize on the success of the title track, which rose to number four on the pop singles chart and number one on the R&B singles chart. The album was produced by Holland–Dozier–Holland (who composed the group's first five hit singles) and William "Mickey" Stevenson. This was the last album to feature original Vandella Annette Beard.

The material is composed almost entirely of cover versions of songs that were popular at the time. These range from pop tunes like "Then He Kissed Me" and "My Boyfriend's Back" to mainstream standards such as "More" (the theme from the 1962 film Mondo Cane) and "Danke Schoen." The folk song "If I Had a Hammer" is also included as the Peter, Paul, and Mary version was big at the time. The album cover was designed by Bernie Yeszin. It was the group's first album to chart the Billboard 200 peaking at a very low number 125, spending just five weeks on the chart. It was one of the first albums by a Motown female band to chart.

== Track listing ==
Side one
No.	Title	Writer(s)	Length
1.	"Heat Wave"	Holland–Dozier–Holland	2:39
2.	"Then He Kissed Me"	Phil Spector; Ellie Greenwich; Jeff Barry	2:30
3.	"Hey There Lonely Boy"	Leon Carr; Earl Shuman	2:31
4.	"More"	Riz Ortolani	2:13
5.	"Danke Schoen"	Kurt Schwaback; Bert Kaempfert	3:03
6.	"If I Had a Hammer"	Pete Seeger; Lee Hays	2:14

Side two
No.	Title	Writer(s)	Length
1.	"Hello Stranger"	Barbara Lewis	2:38
2.	"Just One Look"	Gregory Carroll; Doris Payne	2:32
3.	"Wait Till My Bobby Gets Home"	Spector; Greenwich; Barry	2:16
4.	"My Boyfriend's Back"	Bob Feldman; Jerry Goldstein; Richard Gottehrer	2:07
5.	"Mockingbird"	Inez Foxx; Charlie Foxx	2:30

== Personnel ==
- Martha Reeves – lead vocals
- Rosalind Ashford – backing vocals
- Annette Beard – backing vocals
- Brian Holland and Lamont Dozier – producers
- William "Mickey" Stevenson – producer
- The Funk Brothers – instrumentation
  - Joe Hunter – piano on "Heat Wave"
  - James Jamerson – bass on "Heat Wave"
  - Richard "Pistol" Allen – drums on "Heat Wave"
  - Eddie Willis – guitar on "Heat Wave"
  - Robert White – guitar on "Heat Wave"
  - Andrew "Mike" Terry – baritone saxophone solo on "Heat Wave"

== Singles history ==
- "Heat Wave" b/w "A Love Like Yours (Don't Come Knocking Everyday)" (#4 US Hot 100),(#1 U.S. Top R&B)
