= I'll Have to Let Him Go =

Single by Martha and the Vandellas

from the album Come and Get These Memories
- B-side: "My Baby Won't Come Back"
- Released: September 27, 1962 (U.S.)
- Recorded: August 1, 1962, Hitsville U.S.A. (Studio A), Detroit, Michigan
- Genre: Rhythm and blues; soul
- Length: 3:04
- Label: Gordy; G 7011
- Songwriter: William "Mickey" Stevenson
- Producer: William "Mickey" Stevenson

Martha and the Vandellas singles chronology
"I'll Let You Know" (1961)	"I'll Have to Let Him Go" (1962)	"Come and Get These Memories" (1963)

"I'll Have to Let Him Go" is a 1962 song and single written, composed and produced by William "Mickey" Stevenson and issued on the Gordy (Motown) label. it is notable for being one of two singles that marked the Motown debut of Martha and the Vandellas. The song is about ending a romantic relationship, as its narrator, after seeing her lover kissing and holding another, realizing its over and decides she going “to set him free” even though "it's gonna hurt (her) so".

Originally recorded when the group was just renamed the Vels (from the Del-Phis), the song was one of the first of many recordings led by Martha Reeves; original member Gloria Williams was the group's lead singer up until this point. The song was intended for Mary Wells, but when Wells could not make the session, Martha, then an assistant and secretary to Stevenson, was asked to sing it in her place as a demo record, and she recruited her groupmates Rosalind Ashford, Gloria Williams and Annette Beard to back her. The performance so impressed Stevenson and label president Berry Gordy that they signed the group to the label, decided to release the song as a single, and recorded another single for release, the Williams led "You'll Never Cherish A Love So True('Til You Lose It)" / "There He Is (At My Door)". But by the time of its release the Vels would become first "the Vandellas" and then finally "Martha and the Vandellas". Also around this time, Williams would leave the quartet, deciding that show business was too rigorous, making them a trio from then onward. The Williams-led single was released at the same time as this one, but on the Mel-O-Dy subsidiary and still credited to "the Vells" [sic]. Neither singles charted, but five months later they would release their first hit single, "Come and Get These Memories".

The flip side "My Baby Won't Come Back" was co-written by Reeves and Stevenson, and produced by the latter. It was recorded by the Marvelettes on the same day as Reeves and her group' version, May 8, 1962, but their version would not be released until 2011.

== Personnel ==
- Lead vocals by Martha Reeves
- Background vocals by the Vandellas: Rosalind Ashford, Gloria Williams and Annette Beard
- Hammond organ by Raynoma Liles Gordy
- Other instrumentation by the Funk Brothers
  - Piano by Joe Hunter
  - Bass by James Jamerson
  - Drums by Benny Benjamin
  - Guitar by Eddie Willis
  - Baritone saxophone by Andrew "Mike" Terry
