= Live Wire (Martha and the Vandellas song) =

Single by Martha and the Vandellas
- B-side: "Old Love (Let's Try Again)"
- Released: January 17, 1964
- Recorded: Hitsville U.S.A. (Studio A); 1963
- Genre: Soul, pop
- Length: 2:35
- Label: Gordy
- Songwriter(s): Holland–Dozier–Holland
- Producer(s): Brian Holland, Lamont Dozier

Martha and the Vandellas singles chronology
"Quicksand" (1963)	"Live Wire" (1964)	"In My Lonely Room" (1964)

"Live Wire" is a 1964 dance single released by Motown girl group Martha and the Vandellas.

== Background ==
The song was produced by Holland–Dozier–Holland under the same gospel-pop confection of their earlier hit singles "(Love Is Like a) Heat Wave" and "Quicksand". The song explained why the narrator can't come up with words to tell her lover that she was through with him because when she looks at him, she feels that he is "like a bolt of lightning" and that he's a "live wire".

Cash Box described it as "a red rocker that should move way out in no time flat" demonstrating the "fabulous hit-making excitement that showed up on 'Heat Wave.'"

== Personnel ==
- Lead vocals by Martha Reeves
- Background vocals by Rosalind Ashford and Annette Beard
- Produced by Brian Holland and Lamont Dozier
- Written by Brian Holland, Lamont Dozier and Edward Holland, Jr.
- Instrumentation by the Funk Brothers
  - Andrew "Mike" Terry: baritone saxophone solo

== Chart performance ==
The song failed to hit the Top 40 of the pop chart (peaking at #42) and reached #11 on Cashbox's R&B singles chart (the Billboard R&B chart was suspended until January 1965).
