= There He Is (At My Door) =

Single by The Vandellas (as the Vells)
- A-side: "You'll Never Cherish A Love So True ('Til You Lose It)"
- Released: October 1, 1962 (U.S.)
- Recorded: August 1, 1962 (A-side); August 9, 1962 (B-side), Hitsville U.S.A. (Studio A), Detroit, Michigan
- Genre: Rhythm and blues; soul
- Length: 2:48 (A-side); 2:24 (B-side)
- Label: Mel-O-Dy; M 103 B
- Songwriter(s): Berry Gordy, Jr. (A-side); Holland–Dozier–Holland–Bradford–Gorman (B-side)
- Producer(s): Berry Gordy, Jr. (A-side); Brian Holland; Lamont Dozier (B-side)

"There He Is (At My Door)"

Single by Martha and the Vandellas

from the album Come and Get These Memories & Dance Party
- A-side: "Dancing in the Street"
- B-side: "There He Is (At My Door)"
- Released: June 28, 1963 (album); July 31, 1964 (single) (U.S.)
- Recorded: 1962–1963, Hitsville U.S.A. (Studio A), Detroit, Michigan
- Genre: Rhythm and blues; soul
- Length: 2:24
- Label: Gordy; G 7033
- Songwriter(s): Holland–Dozier–Holland–Bradford–Gorman
- Producer(s): Brian Holland; Lamont Dozier

Martha and the Vandellas singles chronology
"In My Lonely Room" (1964)	"Dancing in the Street" / "There He Is (At My Door)" (1963)	"Wild One" (1964)

"There He Is (At My Door)" is a 1962 song and B-side single written and composed by all three line-ups of what would soon be Motown's main production team (Holland–Dozier–Holland with Eddie Holland's predecessor Janie Bradford, and her predecessor Freddie Gorman). Credited to the Vells the performers on both sides of the single were an early version of the group that would be better known as Martha and the Vandellas. The single is also notable as the last one the label subsidiary would release under an R&B/soul music format, changing that point onward to a country music subsidiary.

== Overview ==
The song's narrator tells of how she's trying to resist going back to her former lover, who keeps "knocking at (her) door", because "that's when heartaches will start again". Originally it was the B-side to the Berry Gordy production, "You'll Never Cherish A Love So True ('Til You Lose It)", whose narrator is warning her man that he better start treating her right before she leaves him and "there'll be no shoulder" for him to lean on. During this period 'the Vels' (the correct spelling of the group's name) main lead singer was founding member Gloria Williams (a.k.a. Gloria Jean Williamson) who leads both sides of this single; group member Rosalind Ashford, in a rare appearance out front, has a spoken part on the A-side's bridge.

However, before the single's release, a frustrated Williams decided that the music business was too risky to rely on as a constant income, and left the group. Motown went ahead and released the single anyway on the Mel-O-Dy label (with the group's name misspelled), while (almost) simultaneously releasing the group's single "I'll Have to Let Him Go" / "My Baby Won't Come Back" on the Gordy label; this marks a double debut of the group on the label, with the latter single also being the debut of the group's new name, Martha and the Vandellas. "There He Is", actually received more airplay than its A-side, but neither side of both singles charted.

The Vandellas later made a second version of "There He Is", but with Reeves lead vocals over the original Instrumental and backing vocal track (and the knocking sound removed). This version would first appear on the group's 1963 debut album, Come and Get These Memories, and then reappear on the B-side of their Top Ten hit single "Dancing in the Street", and the album Dance Party. Cash Box described it as an "active rock-a-cha session."

== Personnel ==
- Lead vocals by Martha Reeves (both sides of 2nd single only), Gloria Williams (both sides of 1st single only) and Rosalind Ashford (spoken part on A-side of 1st single only)
- Background vocals by The Vandellas: Martha Reeves, Rosalind Ashford and Annette Beard
- Instrumentation by The Funk Brothers
