= Nowhere to Run (song) =

- A-side label of one of U.S. vinyl releases

Single by Martha and the Vandellas

from the album Dance Party
- B-side: "Motoring"
- Released: February 10, 1965
- Recorded: October 21, 1964
- Studio: Hitsville U.S.A., Detroit
- Genre: R&B; pop; soul
- Length: 2:55
- Label: Gordy
- Songwriter: Holland–Dozier–Holland
- Producers: Lamont Dozier, Brian Holland

Martha and the Vandellas singles chronology
"Wild One" (1964)	"Nowhere to Run" (1965)	"You've Been in Love Too Long" (1965)

"Nowhere to Run" is a 1965 song by Martha and the Vandellas for Berry Gordy's Motown imprint Gordy Records and is one of the group's signature songs. The song, written and produced by Motown's main production team of Holland–Dozier–Holland, depicts the story of a woman trapped in a bad relationship with a man she cannot help but love.

== History ==
Holland–Dozier–Holland and the Funk Brothers band gave the song a large, hard-driving instrumentation sound similar to the sound of Martha and the Vandellas' prior hit "Dancing in the Street" with snow chains used as percussion alongside the tambourine and drums.

A performance of the song, filmed at a Mustang assembly line at the Ford River Rouge Plant in Detroit, opened the June 28, 1965 CBS-TV special Murray The K – It's What's Happening, Baby.

Billboard described the song as a "good dance beat piece of material which features a gospel piano and a wailin' vocal." Cash Box described it as "a hard-driving, fast-moving, raunchy bluesy stomper with a contagious teen-oriented, danceable beat." Record World said it features "a strong, strong beat and wailing by all the girls in concert."

Included on their 1965 third album, Dance Party, "Nowhere to Run" hit number eight on the Billboard Pop Singles chart, and number five on the Billboard R&B Singles chart. It also charted on the UK singles chart peaking at number twenty-six on the chart. The single release was backed with "Motoring".

This version was ranked #358 on Rolling Stone's list of The 500 Greatest Songs of All Time in 2004 and #367 in 2010.

This song is featured in the films Vinyl (1965), The Warriors (1979), Good Morning, Vietnam (1987), Crimson Tide (1995), Bringing Out the Dead (1999), Baby Driver (2017), and the 2012 video game Spec Ops: The Line.

In July 1988, following the success of the film Good Morning, Vietnam, the song was re-released in the UK by A&M Records, with James Brown's "I Got You (I Feel Good)" on the flip side. The single spent three weeks on the UK chart reaching its highest position of number 52 by 24 July 1988.

== Covers ==
- Arnold McCuller made a version of the song for the soundtrack of the movie The Warriors in 1979. It was later utilized again for the video game adaptation in 2005.
- On her 1971 covers album Gonna Take a Miracle, singer-songwriter Laura Nyro performed a version with backing vocals by the group Labelle.
- Lola Colette made a version of the song for the soundtrack of the 2023 movie John Wick: Chapter 4.
- Wild Cherry covered the song in 1976.

== Personnel ==
- Lead vocals by Martha Reeves
- Background vocals by Rosalind Ashford & Betty Kelly
- Written by Brian Holland, Lamont Dozier and Edward Holland Jr.
- Produced by Lamont Dozier and Brian Holland
- All instrumentation by the Funk Brothers:
  - Robert White – guitar
  - Eddie Willis – guitar
  - Earl Van Dyke – piano
  - Benny Benjamin – drums
  - James Jamerson – bass guitar
  - Jack Ashford – percussion, tambourine, vibes
  - Ivy Jo Hunter – percussion (snow chains)
  - Russ Conway – trumpet
  - Herbert Williams – trumpet
  - George Bohanon – trombone
  - Paul Riser – trombone
  - Henry Cosby – tenor saxophone
  - Mike Terry – baritone saxophone

== Certifications ==
Region	Certification	Certified units/sales
United Kingdom (BPI)	Gold	400,000^{‡}
^{‡} Sales+streaming figures based on certification alone.
