= Hitch Hike (song) =

Single by Marvin Gaye

from the album That Stubborn Kinda Fellow
- B-side: "Hello There Angel"
- Released: December 19, 1962
- Studio: Hitsville, USA, Detroit
- Genre: R&B
- Length: 2:32
- Label: Tamla
- Songwriters: Marvin Gaye; William "Mickey" Stevenson; Clarence Paul
- Producer: William "Mickey" Stevenson

Marvin Gaye singles chronology
"Stubborn Kind of Fellow" (1962)	"Hitch Hike" (1962)	"Pride and Joy" (1963)

"Hitch Hike" is a 1962 song by Marvin Gaye, released on the Tamla label. It is another song Gaye co-wrote (this time with Clarence Paul and William "Mickey" Stevenson).

The single was successful enough to land Gaye his first top forty pop single in 1963 with "Hitch Hike" reaching number thirty on the pop singles chart while reaching number twelve on the R&B singles chart.

== Background ==
This time instead of confessing to being stubborn, the singer is now hitchhiking on the look out for his girl, who he feels has run so far that he has to travel "around the world" thinking of places she could have found herself at including St. Louis, "Chicago City Limits" and "L.A."

The song sparked a brief dance craze when audience members from American Bandstand performed the "hitch hike" dance. Marvin performed the song on the show and also did the move onstage. The dance was also performed during Marvin's performance of the song in the T.A.M.I. Show. Cash Box described it as "a fetching, shuffle beat cha cha blueser...that the chorus-backed Gaye decks out in potent r&b-pop style." Like "Stubborn", Martha and the Vandellas accompanied Gaye on this song.

== Personnel ==
- Marvin Gaye — lead vocals, drums
- The Vandellas: Martha Reeves, Rosalind Ashford and Annette Beard — background vocals

The Funk Brothers

- Eddie Willis — guitar
- James Jamerson — bass
- Jack Ashford — congas
- Earl Van Dyke — piano
- Henry Cosby — tenor saxophone
- Mike Terry — baritone saxophone
- Thomas "Beans" Bowles — flute

== Cover versions ==
- The Mothers of Invention
- James & Bobby Purify released a version of the song on their 1967 album, James & Bobby Purify.
- Paul McCartney performed a live cover of the song during his 2011 performance at Comerica Park in Detroit, Michigan. Another song which is likely based on "Hitch Hike" is "You Can't Do That" by The Beatles, especially the use of cowbell and congas and the pronounced stops at the end of each verse.
- Martha and the Vandellas, who recorded backing vocals on the original version, covered it on their album Dance Party. Their version uses the original backing track with the Vandellas' backing vocals intact, in addition to Martha Reeves's lead vocal, Rosalind Ashford and Betty Kelly's harmony vocals, and added percussion from the Funk Brothers.
- It was covered in 1965 by The Rolling Stones on their album Out Of Our Heads.
- It was covered in 1966 by The Grass Roots on their first album Where Were You When I Needed You.
- It was covered in 1966 by The Sonics on their album Boom (album).
- It was covered in 1984 by Alison Moyet as the B-side of her single Invisible.
- The Spiders (the first incarnation of the band Alice Cooper) recorded it as the B-side of their 1966 single "Why Don't You Love Me".

== Influences ==
- The Velvet Underground's song "There She Goes Again" is based on "Hitch Hike", as is the guitar intro to The Smiths' "There Is a Light That Never Goes Out" (Johnny Marr specifically credits The Rolling Stones' cover as the inspiration).
