= A Love Like Yours (Don't Come Knocking Everyday) =

1963 song by Holland–Dozier–Holland

"A Love Like Yours (Don't Come Knocking Every Day)"

Single by Martha and the Vandellas

from the album Come and Get These Memories
- A-side: "Heat Wave"
- Released: June 28, 1963 (album); July 9, 1963 (single)
- Recorded: Hitsville U.S.A. (Studio A), May 2, 1963
- Genre: Soul
- Label: Gordy G 7022
- Songwriter: Holland–Dozier–Holland
- Producers: Brian Holland; Lamont Dozier

Martha and the Vandellas singles chronology
"Come and Get These Memories" (1963)	"Heat Wave" / "A Love Like Yours (Don't Come Knocking Everyday)" (1963)	"Quicksand" (1963)

"A Love Like Yours (Don't Come Knocking Everyday)"
- 1966 UK single

Single by Ike & Tina Turner

from the album River Deep - Mountain High
- B-side: "Hold On Baby"
- Released: October 1966 (UK); August 1967 (US)
- Recorded: 1966
- Studio: Gold Star Studios, Los Angeles, California
- Genre: Soul; pop; pop rock
- Length: 2:52
- Label: London (UK); Philles (US)
- Songwriter: Holland-Dozier-Holland
- Producer: Phil Spector

Ike & Tina Turner singles chronology
"I'll Never Need More Than This" (1967)	"A Love Like Yours (Don't Come Knocking Everyday)" (1967)	"So Fine" (1968)

"A Love Like Yours (Don't Come Knocking Everyday)"

Single by Harry Nilsson & Cher

from the album All Meat
- B-side: "(Just Enough To Keep Me) Hangin' On"
- Released: 1975
- Recorded: 1975
- Genre: Pop rock
- Length: 3:38
- Label: Phil Spector International; Warner-Spector
- Songwriter: Holland–Dozier–Holland
- Producer: Phil Spector

Cher singles chronology
"A Woman's Story" (1974)	"A Love Like Yours (Don't Come Knocking Everyday)" (1975)	"Pirate" (1977)

"A Love Like Yours (Don't Come Knocking Everyday)" is a 1963 song issued as the B-side to Motown singing group Martha and the Vandellas' hit single, "Heat Wave", released on the Gordy label.

The song, written and produced by Vandellas cohorts, Holland–Dozier–Holland, is a song where a woman praises her lover for loving her after she "broke (his) heart and made (him) blue" saying afterwards "instead of hurting back" telling her he loved her.

The song, while not released as a single A-side, is regarded as a sixties classic with notable covers by Ike & Tina Turner, Dusty Springfield, Harry Nilsson and Cher, Juice Newton, Manfred Mann, and the Animals. Ike & Tina's version was the only version that became a charted hit peaking at No. 16 on the UK Singles charts.

== Credits ==
- Lead vocals and spoken monologues by Martha Reeves
- Background vocals by Rosalind Ashford, Annette Beard, and Brian Holland
- Produced by Brian Holland and Lamont Dozier
- Written by Brian Holland, Lamont Dozier and Edward Holland, Jr.
- Instrumentation by The Funk Brothers

== Ike & Tina Turner version ==
Ike & Tina Turner recorded a version for their 1966 album River Deep – Mountain High. The single was released on London Records in the UK in October 1966. The single received positive reviews.

Ike & Tina Turner performed the song on the British TV show Ready Steady Go!.

A limited amount of copies were issued in the US by Phil Spector's label Philles Records in 1967. This was the label's final release of any single. The album River Deep – Mountain High was not released in the US until it was reissued by A&M Records in 1969. Following the album's reissue, "A Love Like Yours (Don't Come Knocking Everyday)" was reissued as a single in the US in 1970.

=== Track listing ===
1966 UK single
No.	Title	Writer(s)	Length
1.	"A Love Like Yours (Don't Come Knocking Everyday)"	Holland–Dozier–Holland
2.	"Hold On Baby"	Ellie Greenwich, Jeff Barry

1967 US single
No.	Title	Writer(s)	Length
1.	"A Love Like Yours (Don't Come Knocking Everyday)"	Holland–Dozier–Holland
2.	"I Idolize You"	Ike Turner

1970 US reissue
No.	Title	Writer(s)	Length
1.	"A Love Like Yours (Don't Come Knocking Every Day)"	Holland–Dozier–Holland
2.	"Save the Last Dance for Me"	Pomus, Shuman

=== Chart performance ===
Chart (1966)	Peak position
UK Singles Chart	16
