= Come and Get These Memories =

Single by Martha and the Vandellas

from the album Come and Get These Memories
- B-side: "Jealous Lover"
- Released: February 22, 1963
- Recorded: Hitsville U.S.A. (Studio A); 1962
- Genre: R&B
- Length: 2:24
- Label: Gordy; G 7014
- Songwriter: Holland–Dozier–Holland
- Producers: Brian Holland, Lamont Dozier

Martha and the Vandellas singles chronology
"I'll Have to Let Him Go" (1962)	"Come and Get These Memories" (1963)	"(Love Is Like a) Heat Wave" (1963)

"Come and Get These Memories" is an R&B song by Motown girl group Martha and the Vandellas. Their second single released under Motown's Gordy Records subsidiary, "Memories" became the group's first hit single, reaching number 29 on the Billboard Pop Singles Chart, and number-six on the Billboard R&B Singles Chart.

== Background ==
The song speaks of heartbreak, as the narrator (lead singer Martha Reeves) goes through her things and gives back everything her now ex-boyfriend had given her, including teddy bears, records, and "lingering love".

"Memories" is also notable as the first hit recording written and produced by the songwriting/production team of Holland-Dozier-Holland, who would become the top creative team at Motown by the end of 1965. The single was the first of several hits the Vandellas scored with the team, before Holland-Dozier-Holland began to focus more heavily on hits for The Supremes and the Four Tops. However, Holland–Dozier–Holland would continue to collaborate with the Vandellas until the songwriting team's departure from Motown in 1967.

== Personnel ==
- Produced by Brian Holland and Lamont Dozier
- Written by Brian Holland, Lamont Dozier and Edward Holland, Jr.
- Lead vocals by Martha Reeves
- Background vocals by Rosalind Ashford and Annette Beard
- Instrumentation by the Funk Brothers:
  - Benny Benjamin: drums
  - James Jamerson: double bass
  - Joe Hunter: piano
  - Earl Van Dyke: Wurlitzer electronic piano
  - Robert White: guitar
  - Eddie Willis: guitar
  - Andrew "Mike" Terry: baritone saxophone

== Chart performance ==
Chart (1963)	Peak position
Canada CHUM	28
US Billboard Hot 100	29
US Billboard Hot R&B Singles	6

== Other versions ==
- The Supremes recorded their version (featuring Mary Wilson on lead vocals) which was included on their 1966 The Supremes A' Go-Go album.
- Fellow Motown singer Kim Weston recorded the song, but it remained unreleased until her Motown Anthology (and the Motown Sings Motown Treaures album) was released in 2005
- Bette Midler recorded the song for her 2014 album It's the Girls!.
