= Stubborn Kind of Fellow =

1962 single by Marvin Gaye

Single by Marvin Gaye

from the album That Stubborn Kinda Fellow
- B-side: "It Hurt Me Too"
- Released: July 23, 1962
- Recorded: June 29, 1962
- Studio: Hitsville USA, Detroit
- Genre: Soul
- Length: 2:44
- Label: Tamla
- Songwriters: Marvin Gaye; William "Mickey" Stevenson; George Gordy
- Producer: William "Mickey" Stevenson

Marvin Gaye singles chronology
"Soldier's Plea" (1962)	"Stubborn Kind of Fellow" (1962)	"Hitch Hike" (1962)

"Stubborn Kind of Fellow" is a song by the American soul singer Marvin Gaye, released in 1962 by Motown's Tamla label. Co-written by Gaye and produced by William "Mickey" Stevenson, "Stubborn Kind of Fellow" became Gaye's first hit single, reaching the top 10 of the R&B chart and the top 50 of the Billboard Hot 100 in late 1962.

== Recording ==
By summer 1962, Marvin Gaye had recorded for Tamla Records, a subsidiary of Motown Enterprises, for a year with limited success. The previous summer, Gaye released his first LP, The Soulful Moods of Marvin Gaye, an album of jazz and pop standards that failed to crack the charts. He had also released a total of three singles, all of which also failed to enter the Billboard charts. According to some within the label, he was considered "the least likely hit maker". During 1961, Gaye had spent time on the road as a drummer for fellow Tamla act, The Miracles, and had also drummed for blues artist Jimmy Reed, earning $5 weekly. In early 1962, Gaye scored his first major success as a songwriter, composing music with producer Mickey Stevenson and George Gordy on The Marvelettes' top 40 hit, "Beechwood 4-5789".

Though he had initially wanted to avoid the rhythm and blues market, Gaye figured it was his only way to establish himself as a crossover pop act, and reluctantly agreed to record a song in that style. Hiring Stevenson and Gordy, Gaye wrote and composed a song that fit his sometimes moody attitude, titling it "Stubborn Kind of Fellow" after Berry Gordy suggested some piano chord changes to Gaye. In a 1982 interview conducted in Europe, Gaye recalled "Berry heard me playing it on the piano. He came over and he said something to the effect of, 'I like that melody but can you do something else with it.' That was my first power encounter with him. I remember he wanted me to change some chords. I had a brief argument with him as to why I thought it should remain the way I wrote it. In any event, I changed things his way."

With Gaye singing in a husky, strong voice, the song's guitarist Dave Hamilton later stated, "You could hear the man screaming on that tune, you could tell he was hungry", further indicating Gaye's determination to succeed noting, "If you listen to that song you'll say, 'Hey man, he was trying to make it because he was on his last leg'." The song included Martha Reeves on background vocals with several of her friends from a former group, the Del-Phis, including Rosalind Ashford and Annette Beard. Reeves, Ashford and Beard later formed Martha and the Vandellas at the end of the year. Raynoma Gordy Singleton, then-wife of Berry Gordy, claimed in her autobiography Berry, Me & Motown that she was the fourth backing singer on the song

== Personnel ==
- Marvin Gaye — lead vocals
- The Del-Phis: Martha Reeves, Rosalind Ashford, Gloria Williams and Annette Beard — background vocals

The Funk Brothers

- Dave Hamilton — guitar
- Joe Hunter — piano
- Thomas "Beans" Bowles — flute
- James Jamerson — acoustic bass
- Benny Benjamin — drums

== Release and live performances ==
Released as a single on July 23, 1962. Though Gaye was initially disappointed it did not become a bigger pop hit, he was satisfied that he finally had a hit record. The song and follow-up hit, "Hitch Hike", eventually gave Gaye top billing over other acts during the Motortown Revue performances of 1963.

Gaye performed the song constantly during his early years, most notably on the recorded performance of the Motortown Revue at the Apollo Theater in June 1963. Gaye performed it less frequently during the latter half of his career, often singing parts of the song as part of a "sixties medley" during his 1970s concert shows.

== Chart history ==
"Stubborn Kind of Fellow" was Gaye's first song to crack the Billboard Hot 100, eventually peaking at number 46. On the Hot R&B Sides chart, the song peaked at number 8.

Chart (1962)	Peak position
U.S. Billboard Hot 100	46
U.S. Billboard Hot R&B Singles	8

== Mentions ==
- Gaye hinted at the title of the song on at least two recordings: on his 1973 duet album with Diana Ross, Diana & Marvin, he mentions "I'm just a stubborn kind of fella", at the end of their recording of the ballad, "Include Me In Your Life". On his 1978 album, Here, My Dear, he sings one of ex-wife Anna's quotes to him, "what's it husband, makes you so stubborn?"
- When Phil Spector first heard "Stubborn Kind of Fellow" he was so excited he lost control of his car while driving down Sunset Boulevard with Jack Nitzsche.

== Cover versions ==
- The McCoys - on their 1965 debut album, Hang on Sloopy.
- Lou Courtney released a funk version as "Stubborn Kind of Fella" with his band Buffalo Smoke in 1976. It became a club hit in discotheques of France, Spain and Italy in 1978.

== Sources ==
- Dahl, Bill (February 28, 2011). Motown: The Golden Years: More than 100 rare photographs. Krause Publications. ISBN 978-1-44022-783-7.
- Posner, Gerald (April 2, 2009). Motown: Music, Money, Sex and Power. Random House LLC. ISBN 978-0-30753-862-8.
