= Standing in the Shadows of Motown =

- Theatrical release poster for Standing in the Shadows of Motown
- Directed by: Paul Justman
- Written by: Walter Dallas, Ntozake Shange, Allan Slutsky
- Produced by: Paul Justman; Sandford Passman; Allan Slutsky
- Narrated by: Andre Braugher
- Distributed by: Artisan Entertainment
- Release date: November 15, 2002
- Running time: 116 mins
- Country: United States
- Language: English

Standing in the Shadows of Motown is a 2002 American documentary film directed by Paul Justman that recounts the story of the Funk Brothers, the uncredited and largely unheralded studio musicians who were the house band that Berry Gordy hand-picked in 1959.

== Background ==
The Funk Brothers recorded and performed on Motown's recordings from 1959 to 1972. The film was inspired by the 1989 book Standing in the Shadows of Motown: The Life and Music of Legendary Bassist James Jamerson, a bass guitar instruction book by Allan Slutsky, which features a biography of James Jamerson along with his bass lines.

The film covers the Funk Brothers' career via interviews with surviving band members, archival footage and still photos, dramatized re-enactments, and narration by actor Andre Braugher. The film also features new live performances of several Motown hit songs, with the Funk Brothers backing up Gerald Levert, Me'shell Ndegeocello, Joan Osborne, Ben Harper, Bootsy Collins, Chaka Khan, and Montell Jordan.

The impetus behind making the film was to bring these influential players out of anonymity. In addition to bassist James Jamerson, the Funk Brothers consisted of the following musicians: Jack Ashford (percussion); Bob Babbitt (bass); Joe Hunter (keyboards); Uriel Jones (drums); Joe Messina (guitar); Eddie Willis (guitar); Richard "Pistol" Allen (drums); Benny "Papa Zita" Benjamin (drums); Eddie "Bongo" Brown (percussion); Johnny Griffith (keyboards); Earl Van Dyke (keyboards); and Robert White (guitar).

The Funk Brothers produced more hits than the Beatles, the Rolling Stones, the Beach Boys and Elvis Presley combined. It was their sound, according to Mary Wilson (of the Supremes), that backed the Temptations, the Supremes, the Miracles, the Four Tops, Gladys Knight & the Pips, Marvin Gaye, Stevie Wonder, and Mary Wells, among other noteworthy bands during their tenure from 1959 to 1972.

== Soundtrack album ==
Professional ratings
Review scores
Source	Rating
AllMusic	4/5 stars

Released by Hip-O Records.

1. "(Love Is Like a) Heat Wave" – Joan Osborne
2. "You've Really Got a Hold on Me" – Meshell Ndegeocello
3. "Do You Love Me" – Bootsy Collins
4. "Bernadette" – The Funk Brothers
5. "Reach Out I'll Be There" – Gerald Levert
6. "Ain't Too Proud to Beg" - Ben Harper
7. "Shotgun" – Gerald Levert featuring Tom Scott
8. "What Becomes of the Brokenhearted" – Joan Osborne
9. "I Heard It Through the Grapevine" – Ben Harper
10. "You Keep Me Hangin' On" – The Funk Brothers
11. "Cool Jerk" – Bootsy Collins
12. "Cloud Nine" – Meshell Ndegeocello
13. "What's Going On" – Chaka Khan
14. Band Introduction/"Ain't No Mountain High Enough" – Chaka Khan & Montell Jordan
15. "The Flick" – Earl Van Dyke
16. "Boom Boom" – John Lee Hooker [Deluxe Edition bonus track]
17. "(Your Love Keeps Lifting Me) Higher and Higher" – Jackie Wilson [Deluxe Edition bonus track]
18. "Scorpio" – Dennis Coffey & The Detroit Guitar Band [Deluxe Edition bonus track]

In The Snakepit: Naked Instrumental Remixes Of The Original Hits
Deluxe Edition bonus CD, 2004

1. "Funk Brothers in the House" – Bootsy Collins
2. "Standing in the Shadows of Love" – The Funk Brothers
3. Dialogue: Joe Hunter, in the beginning – Joe Hunter
4. "The One Who Really Loves You" – The Funk Brothers
5. "Pride and Joy" – The Funk Brothers
6. Dialogue: Robert White invents a classic – Robert White
7. "My Girl" – The Funk Brothers
8. "Love Is Like an Itching in My Heart" – The Funk Brothers
9. "Don't Mess with Bill" (Live) – The Funk Brothers
10. "The Hunter Gets Captured by the Game" – The Funk Brothers
11. Dialogue: Eddie, Uriel and Jack speaking the "language" – Eddie Willis, Uriel Jones & Jack Ashford
12. "I Second That Emotion" – The Funk Brothers
13. "I Was Made to Love Her" – The Funk Brothers
14. Dialogue: "Pistol" picks up the beat – Richard "Pistol" Allen
15. "I Heard It Through the Grapevine" (Gladys Knight & the Pips version) – The Funk Brothers
16. "Home Cookin'" – The Funk Brothers
17. "For Once in My Life" – The Funk Brothers
18. Dialogue: Jack in the club groove – Jack Ashford
19. "I Can't Get Next to You" – The Funk Brothers
20. "It's a Shame" – The Funk Brothers
21. "Ain't No Mountain High Enough" (Diana Ross version) – The Funk Brothers
22. Dialogue: Eddie takes it to the bridge – Eddie Willis
23. "Mercy Mercy Me (The Ecology)" – The Funk Brothers
24. Dialogue: Feeling the Funk, Brother – Lamont Dozier
25. "You're My Everything" – James Jamerson & The Temptations (Bonus Track)

== Reception ==
On review aggregator website Rotten Tomatoes, the film holds an approval rating of 91% based on 91 reviews, with an average rating of 7.6/10.

== Awards ==
- 2002 National Society of Film Critics: Best Non-Fiction Film
- 2002 New York Film Critics Circle: Best Non-Fiction Film
- 2002 Austin Film Festival: Audience Award, Best Documentary Showcase Film
- 2003 Maryland Film Festival: Closing Night Selection
- 2003 Grammy Award: Best Compilation Soundtrack Album for a Motion Picture, Television or Other Visual Media
- 2003 Grammy Award: Best Traditional R&B Vocal Performance, "What's Going On", Chaka Khan & the Funk Brothers

== Home media ==
The film was released on DVD and VHS on April 22, 2003.
