= Paul Riser =

American musician (born 1943)

- Born: September 11, 1943 (age 83)
- Origin: Detroit, Michigan, U.S.
- Genres: R&B, Soul
- Occupations: Trombonist, arranger
- Instrument: Trombone
- Years active: 1964–present
- Label: Motown
- Formerly of: The Funk Brothers

Paul Riser (born September 11, 1943) is an American trombonist and Motown musical arranger who was responsible for co-writing and arranging dozens of top ten hit records. His legacy as one of the "Funk Brothers" is similar to that of most of the other "Brothers", as his career has been overlooked and overshadowed by the stars of Motown that became household names. Some of the Funk Brothers with whom he worked include: Earl Van Dyke, Johnny Griffith, Robert White, Eddie Willis, Joe Messina, Dennis Coffey, Wah Wah Watson, James Jamerson, Bob Babbitt, Eddie Watkins, Richard "Pistol" Allen, Uriel Jones, Andrew Smith, Jack Ashford, Valerie Simpson, Eddie "Bongo" Brown, Benny Benjamin, Cornelius Grant, Joe Hunter, Richard "Popcorn" Wylie, Marcus Belgrave, Teddy Buckner and Stevie Wonder.

== Early career ==
A graduate of Cass Technical High School in Detroit, Michigan, where he studied classical and jazz trombone, Riser was introduced to Berry Gordy at Motown by a friend who had already been working there. Riser went on to become an uncredited trombonist on most of Motown Records' hits in the late to mid-1960s and early 1970s (Motown did not list session musician credits on their releases until 1971). He arranged hit recordings such as: "My Girl" and "Papa Was a Rollin' Stone" by The Temptations, "I Heard It Through the Grapevine" by Marvin Gaye, "If I Were Your Woman" by Gladys Knight & the Pips, "Reach Out and Touch (Somebody's Hand) written by Ashford and Simpson, and "Ain't No Mountain High Enough" as performed by Diana Ross (among other 1970s hits by the singer), and "The Tears of a Clown" by Smokey Robinson & The Miracles. The instrumental arrangement for "Papa Was a Rollin' Stone" (The Temptations) earned Riser a Grammy Award with writer/arranger Norman Whitfield for Best R&B Instrumental Performance. He co-wrote Jimmy Ruffin's hit single "What Becomes of the Brokenhearted".

== Later career ==
After 11 years of working steadily with Motown, Riser found work with other record labels. Artists for whom Riser has arranged, outside Motown, include: Luther Vandross, Phil Collins, The Carpenters, Carly Simon, The Doobie Brothers, Tom Jones, Quincy Jones, Natalie Cole, Aretha Franklin, Roberta Flack, Michael McDonald, Johnny Mathis, Mary J. Blige, and Patti LaBelle.

Riser arranged and conducted the strings on "I Believe I Can Fly", the 1996 Grammy Award-winning song written, produced and performed by R&B singer R. Kelly. In 2003, Riser was also a notable presence on R. Kelly's album, "Chocolate Factory", arranging many songs on the album including the top 10 hit, "Step in the Name of Love".

In 2009, Riser was inducted into the Musicians Hall of Fame and Museum and he attended the Motown 50th anniversary celebration. As of 2010, Riser is still active in the field of music - teaching and arranging.

When asked in a recent interview what his favorite musical rhythm arrangement was, he replied that it was Diana Ross's cover version of "Ain't No Mountain High Enough", which he arranged in 1970.

== Partial discography ==
- Diana Ross & the Supremes Join The Temptations LP (Co-arranger - Motown, 1968)
- Soul Spin LP by The Four Tops (Co-arranger - Motown MS 695, 1969)
- Signed, Sealed & Delivered LP by Stevie Wonder (Co-arranger - Motown TS 304, 1970)
- Naturally Together LP by The Originals (band) (Co-arranger - Motown SS729, 1970)
- Natural Resources LP by Martha Reeves & The Vandellas (Co-arranger - Gordy 952, 1970)
- Great Expectations LP by Kiki Dee (Arranger - Tamla 303, 1970)
- War and Peace LP by Edwin Starr (Co-arranger - Motown, 1970)
- The Return of the Magnificent Seven LP by The Supremes & The Four Tops (Co-arranger - Motown, 1971)
- If I Were Your Woman LP by Gladys Knight & the Pips (Co-arranger - Motown SS 731, 1971)
- One Dozen Roses LP by Smokey Robinson & The Miracles (Arranger - Tamla 312L)
- Surrender (Arranger - Motown, 1971)
- Exposed LP by Valerie Simpson (Arranger - Motown, 1971)
- Floy Joy LP by The Supremes (Arranger - Motown M751L, 1972)
- All Directions LP by The Temptations (Arranger and conductor - Motown, 1972)
- Neither One Of Us LP by Gladys Knight & The Pips (Arranger - "Can't Give It Up No More" - Motown, 1973)
- Masterpiece LP by The Temptations (Arranger - Motown, 1973)
- All I Need Is Time LP by Gladys Knight & The Pips (Arranger - "Thank You (Falletin Me Be Mice Elf Again)" - Motown, 1973)
- Diana & Marvin LP by Diana Ross & Marvin Gaye (Arranger - "Just Say, Just Say" - Motown, 1973)
- Eddie Kendricks LP by Eddie Kendricks (Arranger - "Where Do You Go (Baby)" - Motown, 1973)
- Share My Love LP by Gloria Jones (Arranger - Motown, 1973)
- Everybody Likes Some Kind of Music - LP by Billy Preston (String and horn arrangements - A&M, 1973)
- Syreeta LP by Syreeta and Stevie Wonder (String arrangements, Motown, 1974)
- Love Trip LP by Tamiko Jones - (String & horn arrangement, Arista Records AL 4040, 1975)
- I Want You (Marvin Gaye album) - LP by Marvin Gaye (Arranger - "Soon I'll Be Loving You Again" - Motown, 1976)
- Look Out for #1 LP by The Brothers Johnson (Horn arrangements, A&M, 1976)
- Any Way You Like It LP by Thelma Houston (Writer, Arranger, Motown 2643-S, 1976)
- Keep It Comin' LP by Valerie Simpson (Arranger, Tamla/Motown, 1977)
- Shake It Well LP by The Dramatics (Co-arranger, ABC Records, 1977)
- Who's Zoomin' Who? LP by Aretha Franklin (String arrangements, Arista, 1985)
- In Square Circle LP by Stevie Wonder (String arrangements, Tamla/Motown, 1985)
- Anomie & Bonhomie LP by "Scritti Politti" (String Arrangements - "Brushed with oil, Dusted with powder" -Virgin 1999)
