= Heat Wave (1963 song) =

1963 single by Martha and the Vandellas

- A-side label of one of US vinyl releases

Single by Martha and the Vandellas

from the album Heat Wave
- B-side: "A Love Like Yours (Don't Come Knocking Everyday)"
- Released: July 10, 1963
- Recorded: June 20, 1963
- Studio: Hitsville U.S.A., Detroit
- Genre: Soul
- Length: 2:47
- Label: Gordy
- Songwriter: Holland–Dozier–Holland
- Producers: Brian Holland; Lamont Dozier

Martha and the Vandellas singles chronology
"Come and Get These Memories" (1963)	"Heat Wave" (1963)	"Quicksand" (1963)

"Heat Wave" (also known as "(Love Is Like a) Heat Wave") is a 1963 song written by Holland–Dozier–Holland. It was first made popular by the Motown vocal group Martha and the Vandellas, who issued it as a single on July 10, 1963, on the Motown subsidiary Gordy Records. The single reached number one on the Billboard Hot R&B chart (where it stayed for four weeks) and number 4 on the Billboard Hot 100.

It was covered 12 years later by vocalist Linda Ronstadt on her Platinum-selling 1975 album Prisoner in Disguise. Ronstadt's version of the song was released as a single in September 1975, reaching number 5 in on the Hot 100, number 4 on the Cash Box chart, and 6 in Record World. In 2010, a version by Phil Collins spent a single week at number 28 on the Billboard Adult Contemporary chart.

== Martha and the Vandellas original version ==
=== Background, composition and reception ===
"Heat Wave" was one of many songs written and produced by Holland–Dozier–Holland. It was the second hit collaboration between them and Martha and the Vandellas after "Come and Get These Memories". The lyrics of "Heat Wave" feature the song's narrator singing about a man who has her heart "burning with desire" and "going insane", and asking, "is this the way love's supposed to be?" Cash Box described it as a "danceable rock-a-twister" that could return the group to the Top 20. The song is often referred to as "(Love Is Like a) Heat Wave", but the title on the label of the original 1963 single was simply "Heat Wave".

Produced and composed with a gospel backbeat, jazz overtones and, doo-wop call and responsive vocals, "Heat Wave" was one of the first songs to exemplify the style of music later termed as the "Motown Sound". The single was a breakthrough hit, peaking at number 4 on the Billboard Hot 100, and at number 1 on the Billboard R&B Singles Chart. It also garnered the group's only Grammy Award nomination for Best Rhythm and Blues Recording for 1964, making the Vandellas the first Motown group ever to receive a Grammy Award nomination.

Some versions of the song have a radio edit that cuts out the repetition of the ending of the instrumental portion of the song, which is in one key, featuring the repeated saxophone and piano portion. In a version issued on the compilation Gold, the instrumental is extended as well as the ending portion, which includes Martha Reeves singing more ad-libs while the backing vocalists continue to sing the word "burning" repeatedly.

The success of "Heat Wave" helped popularize both Martha and the Vandellas and Holland-Dozier-Holland, while cementing Motown's prominence.

=== Influence and use in other media ===
The Martha and the Vandellas version was featured in the 1970 film The Boys in the Band, in a scene in which several of the characters perform an impromptu line dance to the recording. It also appeared in Brian De Palma's 1976 film Carrie and was also featured in the 1979's More American Graffiti and is included on the film's soundtrack album. In the film Sister Act (1992), Whoopi Goldberg sings the song (arranged by Marc Shaiman) as part of her Vegas nightclub act saluting 1960s girl groups.

In 1987, the song was covered for an L&P advertisement by a New Zealand supergroup (later renamed "80 in the Shade") featuring Margaret Ulrich, Annie Crummer and others.

In a 2007 DVD titled The Lovin' Spoonful with John Sebastian – Do You Believe in Magic, John Sebastian illustrates how he sped up the three-chord intro from "Heat Wave" to come up with the intro to "Do You Believe in Magic".

The song was ranked number 50 among the greatest singles ever made in Dave Marsh's 1989 book The Heart of Rock & Soul. Billboard 's editorial staff named it number 12 on their list of 100 greatest girl group songs of all time. In 2021, it was listed at number 257 on Rolling Stone's top 500 best songs of all time.

=== Credits and personnel ===
- Lead vocals – Martha Reeves
- Backing vocals – Rosalind Ashford and Annette Beard
- Produced by Brian Holland and Lamont Dozier
- Written by Brian Holland, Lamont Dozier, and Eddie Holland
- Instrumentation by the Funk Brothers:
  - Richard "Pistol" Allen – drums
  - James Jamerson – double bass
  - Joe Hunter – piano
  - Robert White – guitar
  - Eddie Willis – guitar
  - Mike Terry – baritone saxophone

=== Chart performance and certifications ===
Weekly chart (1963)	Peak position
New Zealand Lever Hit Parade	6
US Billboard Hot 100	4
US R&B	1

Year-end chart (1963)	Position
US Billboard Hot 100	32

Region	Certification	Certified units/sales
United Kingdom (BPI) Sales since November 14, 2004	Silver	200,000^{‡}
^{‡} Sales+streaming figures based on certification alone.

== Linda Ronstadt version ==
"Heat Wave"

Single by Linda Ronstadt

from the album Prisoner in Disguise
- B-side: "Love Is a Rose"
- Released: September 1975
- Recorded: 1975
- Studio: The Sound Factory, Los Angeles
- Genre: Rock
- Length: 2:46
- Label: Asylum
- Songwriter: Holland–Dozier–Holland
- Producer: Peter Asher

Linda Ronstadt singles chronology
"When Will I Be Loved" / "It Doesn't Matter Anymore" (1975)	"Heat Wave" (1975)	"Tracks of My Tears" (1975)

=== Background and reception ===
Linda Ronstadt remade "Heat Wave" for her album Prisoner in Disguise which was recorded at The Sound Factory in Hollywood between February and June 1975 and released that October. Ronstadt's sideman Andrew Gold told Rolling Stone: "[her] band had been trying to get Linda to add it to her [live] set for quite awhile [sic]...one night at a Long Island club called My Father's Place we received six encores and we'd run of tunes. One of us yelled out 'Heat Wave in D' and we did it. [The band was] awfully sloppy but the crowd really liked it. So we kept the song in our set."

Michael Epstein, the manager of My Father's Place, states he was responsible for Ronstadt's singing "Heat Wave" at his club: when Ronstadt went backstage after advising the audience she and the band had no more material, Epstein says he suggested Ronstadt perform "Heat Wave", writing down the lyrics and playing some chords on a guitar to help her band improvise.

According to the Rolling Stone article, the perfectionism of Ronstadt's producer Peter Asher "led to many, many hours of work on 'Heat Wave' in a process that would [likely] amuse the old-line Motown musicians involved in the almost assembly-line approach that resulted in hits including Martha and the Vandellas' 1963 recording of the song."

Although Ronstadt had made her top ten breakthrough in 1975 with remakes of the 1960s hits "You're No Good" and "When Will I Be Loved", the lead single from Prisoner in Disguise was the original Neil Young composition "Love Is a Rose" with "Heat Wave" relegated to the B-side of the single which was released in August 1975. However pop radio disc jockeys preferred "Heat Wave", which rose to a number 5 peak in November 1975, while "Love Is a Rose" received support from C&W radio, reaching number 5 on the C&W chart in Billboard magazine.

=== Personnel ===
- Linda Ronstadt – lead vocals
- Andrew Gold – acoustic guitars, electric guitars, drums, piano, ARP String Ensemble, congas, background vocals, hand claps
- Kenny Edwards – bass, background vocals
- Peter Asher – hand claps

=== Charts ===
Weekly chart (1975)	Peak position
Canada Top Singles (RPM)	12
Canada Adult Contemporary (RPM)	12
US Billboard Hot 100	5
US Adult Contemporary (Billboard)	19
US Cash Box Top 100	4

Year-end chart (1975)	Position
Canada	68

== Phil Collins version ==
"(Love Is Like a) Heatwave"

Single by Phil Collins

from the album Going Back
- B-side: "Never Dreamed You'd Leave in Summer"
- Released: September 6, 2010
- Studio: Dinemec, Geneva
- Genre: Pop
- Length: 2:53
- Label: Atlantic
- Songwriter: Holland–Dozier–Holland
- Producer: Phil Collins

Phil Collins singles chronology
"Don't Let Him Steal Your Heart Away" (2004)	"(Love Is Like a) Heatwave" (2010)	"Going Back" (2010)

Music video
- "Phil Collins - Heatwave (Official Music Video)" on YouTube

=== Background ===
In 2010, Phil Collins remade "Heat Wave" for his cover album Going Back, with the track serving as lead single, the first Phil Collins' single release in over five years. Except for the Carole King/Gerry Goffin-penned title cut and that team's "Some of Your Lovin'"—both Dusty Springfield hits—and also Collins' take on Curtis Mayfield's "Talking About My Baby", Going Back comprised Collins' remakes of Motown classics with the session personnel featuring three members of the Funk Brothers: bassist Bob Babbitt and guitarists Ray Monette and Eddie Willis. Collins stated: "To be able to have three of the surviving Funk Brothers play on all the tracks was unbelievable. There was one moment when they were tracking 'Heat Wave' that I experienced a wave of happiness and wonder that this was actually happening to me!"

On July 31, 2010, Atlantic Records unveiled the music video to support Collins' "Heat Wave" with the singer shown performing the song with a large ensemble of musicians and backing vocalists who performed with him during several showcases promoting the album in the summer of 2010.

=== Track listing ===
1. "(Love Is Like a) Heatwave" – 2:53
2. "Never Dreamed You'd Leave in Summer" – 2:59

=== Musicians ===
- Phil Collins – vocals, drums, percussion, keyboards
- Eddie Willis – guitar
- Ray Monette – guitar
- Bob Babbitt – bass
- Graeme Blevins – tenor saxophone
- Phil Todd – baritone saxophone and solo
- Guy Barker and Tom Rees-Roberts – trumpets
- John Aram – trombone
- Connie Jackson and Lynne Fiddmont – backing vocals

=== Chart performance ===
Weekly chart (2010)	Peak position
Austria (Ö3 Austria Top 40)	52
Germany (GfK)	30
Netherlands (Single Top 100)	82
Belgium (Ultratip Bubbling Under Flanders)	16
Belgium (Ultratop 50 Wallonia)	39
Japan Hot 100 (Billboard)	37
UK Airplay (Music Week)	25
US Adult Contemporary (Billboard)	28

== See also ==
- List of number-one R&B singles of 1963 (U.S.)
