= Mike Terry (saxophonist) =

Background information
- Born: Andrew Alexander Terry; July 18, 1940; Hempstead, Texas, U.S.
- Died: October 30, 2008 (aged 68) Detroit, Michigan, U.S.
- Genres: R&B; Soul
- Occupations: saxophonist, songwriter, arranger, producer
- Instruments: Baritone saxophone
- Years active: 1959 - 1977
- Labels: Motown, Giant, Ric-Tic, Okeh

Andrew Alexander "Mike" Terry (July 18, 1940 – October 30, 2008) was an American saxophonist, songwriter, arranger, producer and musical director. His baritone sax solos feature on the breakthrough hits of Martha and the Vandellas ("Heat Wave", 1963), and The Supremes ("Where Did Our Love Go", 1964). As a member of the Funk Brothers he performed on thousands of Motown recordings from 1960 to 1967, including at least seven US #1 hits. As was Motown's policy at the time, none of the studio musicians were credited by name. Terry was the musical arranger of the 1966 hit "Cool Jerk" by The Capitols, and later became a record producer, with partners including George Clinton, Sidney Barnes, and Jack Ashford.

== Early life ==
Terry was born in Hempstead, Texas, a suburb of Houston, where his father ran a music store. His mother also played piano, and when he was 8 the family moved to Detroit, Michigan. At Cass Technical High School he took up the baritone saxophone, and also met future Motown trombonist/arranger Paul Riser. Terry's early musical influences included saxophonists Charlie Parker, Illinois Jacquet, King Curtis, and Bill Doggett.

== Career ==
By the late 1950s, as a teenager, Terry joined the group Popcorn and the Mohawks, which included future Motown staff musicians and producers Popcorn Wylie, Eddie Willis, James Jamerson, Lamont Dozier, and Norman Whitfield. The group recorded for Motown Records founder Berry Gordy with their first single, 1959's "Custer's Last Man/Shimmy Gully".

By 1960, Terry was a member of the Joe Hunter Band with Benny Benjamin, James Jamerson, Larry Veeder, and Hank Cosby, forming the basis of the ever-growing group of studio musicians contracted to Motown. Terry played in the horn section on Motown's first million-selling single, 1960's "Shop Around" by The Miracles. In 1961 he toured in Jackie Wilson's backing band, and in 1962 toured in Motown's first Motortown Revue, performing on the album Motor Town Revue Vol. 1: Recorded Live At The Apollo. Terry also played on John Lee Hooker's 1962 single "Boom Boom", on Vee-Jay Records.

In 1963, his baritone saxophone solos and instrumental interludes were featured on hit Motown productions by Holland-Dozier-Holland, including Martha and the Vandellas' breakthrough hit "Heat Wave" and Mary Wells' "You Lost the Sweetest Boy". In 1964, he soloed on the Supremes' breakthrough hit "Where Did Our Love Go", and their follow-up "Baby Love". As a member of the group of studio musicians known as the Funk Brothers, he made thousands of recordings, usually in the horn section, with tenor saxophonist Hank Cosby. Motown's practice at the time was to not credit the names of the studio musicians.

Jason Ankeny of Allmusic.com wrote:

[Terry's baritone sax] remains an indelible component of the famed Motown sound - his grunting, gutbucket solos electrified dozens of the most memorable hits... What Terry lacked in technical finesse he made up for in sheer rhythmic propulsion, maximizing the brief windows of opportunity afforded him by the Motown assembly-line production process.

Funk Brother, James Jamerson called him "Lil' Funk", (bandleader Earl Van Dyke was nicknamed "Big Funk").

Frustrated with a lack of opportunities to arrange or produce records at Motown, by the mid-1960s, Terry enrolled at the Detroit Institute of Performing Arts to develop his musical skills. In 1966, he was the credited arranger and conductor of US#7 hit "Cool Jerk" by The Capitols, secretly recorded with the Funk Brothers for the Karen Records label.

By 1966, he and fellow Funk Brother Jack Ashford were planning a future collaboration as songwriters and producers, after playing sessions together for Ed Wingate at Golden World Records. In the mid-60s, Terry worked with Wingate at Ric-Tic Records recording Edwin Starr, J. J. Barnes, Rose Battiste, and other artists. In 1966, Terry joined with George Clinton and Sidney Barnes to form the Geo-Si-Mik production team. Geo-Si-Mik produced records by acts including Clinton's group The Parliaments, Laura Lee, and The Adorables.

Also in 1966, Terry and Ashford formed Pied Piper Productions, writing, arranging, and producing records by acts including September Jones, Nancy Wilcox, Lorraine Chandler, Mikki Farrow, and Willie Kendrick.

In 1967, Terry left Motown and played on soul recordings in Philadelphia and Chicago. In December 1967, he became a staff arranger and producer for Epic Records, and the Okeh Records imprint, where he worked on records by artists including Johnny Robinson, Sandra Phillips, The Little Foxes, and Maxine Brown.

From the late 1960s to the late 1970s, he arranged or produced or worked as a musical director in New York, Los Angeles, Chicago, Atlanta, and Las Vegas. He was the arranger and orchestrator for the 1969 Broadway musical Buck White, featuring Muhammad Ali, and for Bill Cosby in Las Vegas. He also worked closely with Jo Armstead at both Giant Records, and Bill Cosby's label Tetragrammaton Records.

In 1975, he was a member of the Atlanta Disco Band with Dave Crawford, Earl Young, Robert Popwell and others. They released three dance singles that charted, plus one album on Ariola Records.

Terry worked on two blaxploitation films directed by Fred Williamson. He orchestrated music for Boss Nigger (1975), and wrote and produced music for No Way Back (1976), including songs by The Dells.

In the late 1970s, he moved out of the music industry. Terry did not perform in the Funk Brothers reunion which led to the 2002 documentary Standing in the Shadows of Motown, (though he is listed under Honorable Mentions on a two disc DVD edition of the film).

== Private life ==
At one time Terry was married to singer and songwriter Mikki Farrow. Farrow co-wrote songs for Jerry Butler and others. Terry later married Liz, who predeceased him. He died in Detroit in 2008. He is survived by his children Bridgette, Michael, Matthew, and his step-children.

== Honors ==
- In 2010 Mike Terry, as a member of the Funk Brothers, was inducted into the Michigan Rock and Roll Hall of Fame.
- In 2014 Mike Terry was inducted into the Northern Soul Hall of Fame.

Note: Though Terry was a Motown studio musician, he is not personally listed in the following honours, which were mostly awarded to the 13 Funk Brothers who took part in the 2002 reunion.

- In 2004 the Funk Brothers were awarded a Grammy Lifetime Achievement Award.
- In 2007 the Funk Brothers were inducted into the Musicians Hall of Fame and Museum, in Nashville.
- In 2013 the Funk Brothers were honored with a star on the Hollywood Walk of Fame.
- In 2014 the Funk Brothers were inducted into the National Rhythm and Blues Hall of Fame, in Cleveland.

== Selective discography ==
=== Singles ===
Year	Title	Artist	Chart	Mike Terry's role
1960	"Shop Around"	The Miracles	US#2	Baritone sax
1962	"Boom Boom"	John Lee Hooker	US#60, UK#16	Baritone sax
1963	"Heat Wave"	Martha & the Vandellas	US#4	Baritone sax solo
1963	"Quicksand"	Martha & the Vandellas	US#8	Baritone sax solo
1963	"You Lost the Sweetest Boy"	Mary Wells	US#22	Baritone sax solo
1964	"Where Did Our Love Go"	The Supremes	US#1, CAN#1, UK#3	Baritone sax solo
1964	"Baby Love"	The Supremes	US#1, UK#1	Baritone sax feature
1964	"Come See About Me"	The Supremes	US#1, CAN#1	Baritone sax
1964	"(Just Like) Romeo and Juliet"	The Reflections	US#6	Baritone sax solo
1964	"In My Lonely Room"	Martha & the Vandellas	US#6	Baritone sax solo
1965	"Nowhere to Run"	Martha & the Vandellas	US#2, UK#26	Baritone sax
1965	"I Can't Help Myself"	The Four Tops	US#1, UK#10	Baritone sax feature
1965	"It's the Same Old Song"	The Four Tops	US#5	Baritone sax feature
1965	"Stop! In the Name of Love"	The Supremes	US#1, CAN#3, UK#7	Baritone sax
1965	"Back in My Arms Again"	The Supremes	US#1, CAN#1	Baritone sax feature
1965	"I Hear a Symphony"	The Supremes	US#1	Baritone sax solo
1966	"Cool Jerk"	The Capitols	US#7, CAN#9	Arranger
1966	"Stop Her on Sight (S.O.S.)"	Edwin Starr	US#48, UK#11	Baritone sax feature
1966	"Headline News"	Edwin Starr	US#84, UK#39	Arranger
1966	"Open the Door to Your Heart" / "Our Love (Is in the Pocket)"	Darrell Banks	US#27	A-side: Baritone sax B-side: Arranger & sax solo
1966	"This Old Heart of Mine"	The Isley Brothers	US#12, UK#3	Baritone sax feature
1966	"Love Is Like an Itching In My Heart"	The Supremes	US#9	Baritone sax feature
1966	"Don't Mess with Bill"	The Marvelettes	US#7	Baritone sax
1966	"(I'm a) Road Runner"	Junior Walker & the Allstars	US#20, UK#12	Baritone sax feature
1967	"(Your Love Keeps Lifting Me) Higher and Higher"	Jackie Wilson	US#6, CAN#2	Baritone sax
1967	"Ain't Nothin' But A House Party"	The Show Stoppers	US#118, UK#11	Baritone sax
1967	"Girls Are Out to Get You"	The Fascinations	US#92, UK#32	Baritone sax feature
1967	"(I Wanna) Testify"	The Parliaments	US#20	Arranger
1967	"Baby Please Come Back Home"	J. J. Barnes	US#61	Arranger
1968	"The Horse"	Cliff Nobles & Co	US#2	Baritone sax
1968	"Light My Fire"	Rhetta Hughes	-	Co-Producer, arranger
1969	"Jealous Kind of Fella"	Garland Green	US#20	Arranger

=== Albums ===
Year	Title	Artist	Chart	Mike Terry's role
1963	Motor-Town Revue Vol. 1: Recorded Live At The Apollo	Various Artists	US#47	Baritone saxophone
1964	Where Did Our Love Go	The Supremes	US#2	Baritone saxophone
1965	More Hits by The Supremes	The Supremes	US#6	Baritone saxophone
1965	Four Tops Second Album	The Four Tops	US#20	Baritone saxophone
1966	I Hear a Symphony	The Supremes	US#8	Baritone saxophone
1966	The Supremes A' Go-Go	The Supremes	US#1, UK#15	Baritone saxophone
1968	Out of Sight	Maxine Brown		Producer, Arranger
1968	Workin' On A Groovy Thing	Barbara Lewis		Arranger
1969	The Many Grooves of Barbara Lewis	Barbara Lewis		Arranger
1969	Jealous Kind Of Fella	Garland Green		Arranger
1969	Re-Light My Fire	Rhetta Hughes		Co-Producer, arranger
1973	Loleatta	Loleatta Holloway		Arranger
1975	Loneliness & Temptation	Clarence Carter		Arranger
1975	Kickin'	The Mighty Clouds of Joy		Arranger
1975	Bad Luck	Atlanta Disco Band		Writer, Arranger, Musician
1976	No Way Back	The Dells	US R&B#47	Writer, Arranger, Producer
1977	Here Am I	Dave Crawford		Arranger

== Sources ==
- Flory, Andrew. I Hear a Symphony: Motown and crossover R&B, University of Michigan Press, 2017, USA
- Moore, Dave. 'HOF: Mike Terry - Pre Production Inductee', Soul Source magazine, November 7, 2014
- Moss, Robb. 'Mike Terry, Sax God', Manifesto magazine, Issue 85, July 2007, UK
- Randle, Bill. 'Bill Randle in conversation with Mike Terry', Soulful Kinda Music magazine, June 1994
- Rylatt, Keith, Groovesville USA: The Detroit Soul & R&B Index, Stuart Russell, 2010, UK
- Thornton, Jason H. 'The Andrew "Mike" Terry Story', There's That Beat! The Rare Soul Magazine, Issue 4, 2007, UK
- White, Adam, and Bronson, Fred. The Billboard Book of Number One Rhythm and Blues Hits, BPI Communications, 1993
- Williams, Richard. 'Mike Terry Obituary', The Guardian, December 1, 2008, UK
