= Jack Ashford =

American musician (born 1934)

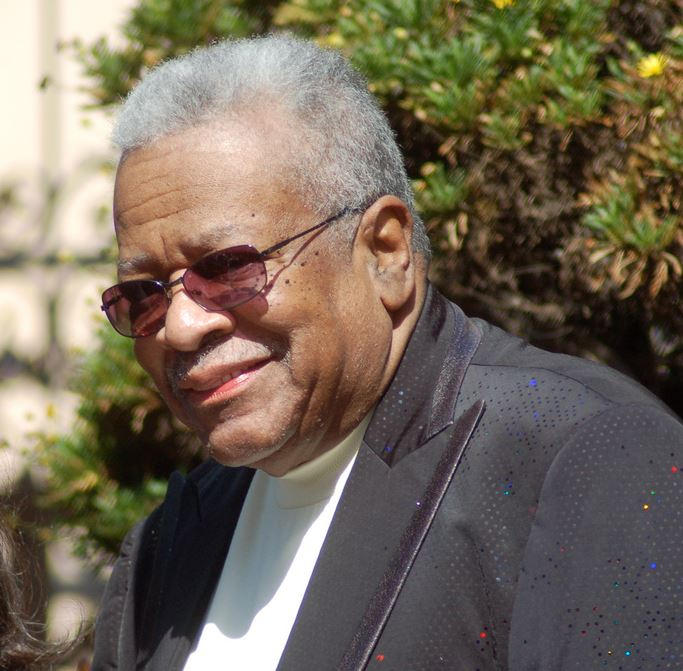
- Ashford in 2013

Background information
- Born: May 18, 1934 (age 92); Philadelphia, Pennsylvania, U.S.
- Occupation: Musician
- Instruments: Percussion; kazoo
- Years active: 1950s–1980s
- Formerly of: The Funk Brothers

Jack Ashford (born May 18, 1934) is an American musician who was a percussionist for Motown Records' in-house Funk Brothers band during the 1960s and early 1970s. Ashford is most famous for playing the tambourine on hundreds of Motown recordings.

== Early life ==
Ashford was born and raised in Philadelphia. He lived with his mother in different relatives' houses, as she did not own a house. Ashford attended the Granoff School of Music.

== Career ==
Ashford was started out as a vibraphone player. His earliest known performance was around 1953, when he toured with The Hamiltones, in Providence, Rhode Island.

He was noticed by Motown in 1963, and hired as a multi-percussionist. Among the percussives Ashford played on records included tambourine, vibraphone, marimba, maracas, cabasa, bells, chimes, bell tree, finger cymbals, kazoo, triangle, wood block, handclaps, foot stomps and hotel sheet. He soon became a high-in demand session player, and is said to have played on thousands of Motown songs throughout the 1960s and 1970s.

His definitive performance is on "War" by Edwin Starr. Other notable songs Ashford played tambourine on include "Nowhere to Run" by Martha & the Vandellas, "You Can't Hurry Love" by the Supremes, "Going to a Go-Go" by the Miracles, "I Heard It Through the Grapevine" by Marvin Gaye, "Signed, Sealed, Delivered I'm Yours" by Stevie Wonder, and "Don't Leave Me This Way" by Thelma Houston. Influenced by Milt Jackson and Lionel Hampton, he played the vibes on Motown recordings such as the Miracles' "Ooo Baby Baby", the Supremes' "Where Did Our Love Go", and Marvin Gaye's "What's Going On".

While working at Motown, he founded his own independent production companies and record labels, including Pied Piper and Just Productions.

In the 1960s and 1970s, Ashford worked closely with singer and songwriter Lorraine Chandler, setting up Pied Piper Productions, and working with her on her own records and those of other musicians in Detroit such as Eddie Parker.

Ashford moved to Los Angeles in the mid-1970s. He played on two albums for The Mighty Clouds of Joy, a gospel quartet, Kickin' (1975) and Live and Direct (1977). His debut solo album was released in 1977. The early 1980s saw production work from Ashford but it proved to be the end of his career in music, he moved back to Detroit and retired from music.

His autobiography, Motown: The View From The Bottom, was released in 2003. The Funk Brothers received a star on the Hollywood Walk of Fame, he and Eddie Willis attended the ceremony. In 2014, he made a recent appearance on The Secret Sisters' second album Put Your Needle Down.

== Personal life ==
Ashford is married to his wife, Charlene, a retired schoolteacher, who helped him write his autobiography. A song on the album, "Shar", was written by Ashford for her.

With the death of Joe Messina in April 2022, Ashford is the last surviving member of the Funk Brothers. (Note: More precisely, Ashford is the last survivor of the 13 Funk Brothers identified in the 2002 documentary Standing in the Shadows of Motown, who in turn were the specific Funk Brothers honored by the National Academy of Recording Arts and Sciences with its Grammy Lifetime Achievement Award in 2004.)
