= Gloria Williams =

American R&B and soul singer (1942–2000)

- Also known as: Gloria Williamson, Gloria Jean, Gloria Jean Williamson
- Born: Gloria Jean Williamson; August 1, 1942; Detroit, Michigan, U.S.
- Died: July 5, 2000 (aged 57) Detroit, Michigan, U.S.
- Genres: R&B, doo-wop, rock'n'roll, soul
- Occupations: Singer, City worker
- Years active: 1957–2000
- Labels: Checkmate, Mel-O-Dy, Tamla, Gordy.
- Formerly of: The Del-Phis, The Vels, Martha and the Vandellas.

Gloria Williams (born Gloria Jean Williamson; August 1, 1942 – July 5, 2000) was an American singer who was the original lead singer of an early incarnation of Martha and the Vandellas under the name The Del-Phis.

== Life and career ==
Born Gloria Jean Williamson in Detroit, Michigan on August 1, 1942, Williams auditioned for a spot in a girl group in 1957, and found herself accompanying Annette Beard, Rosalind Ashford and Martha Reeves in the christened Del-Phis.

The group performed in benefits and high school parties before being signed to the Chess Records subsidiary Checkmate (later bought by Motown Records), where the group recorded a single, "I'll Let You Know", with Williams on lead. Once at Motown, the group sang backing vocals for other acts/artists on studio recordings, such as Marvin Gaye during this period. Williams sang lead on an early single, "There He Is (At My Door)", on the Mel-O-Dy subsidiary of Motown after the group changed their name to The Vels. On the single's flip side, "You'll Never Cherish A Love So True", she shares the lead with Rosalind Ashford, who recorded a spoken part.

After realizing the pressures of show business, Williams left the group, leaving the group as a trio and remaining a teacher and choir director at a local church in Detroit. The group went on to international success with Reeves as lead singer under the name of Martha and the Vandellas.

Williams died from complications of diabetes in Detroit, on July 5, 2000, at the age of 57.
