= Martha Reeves =

American singer (born 1941)

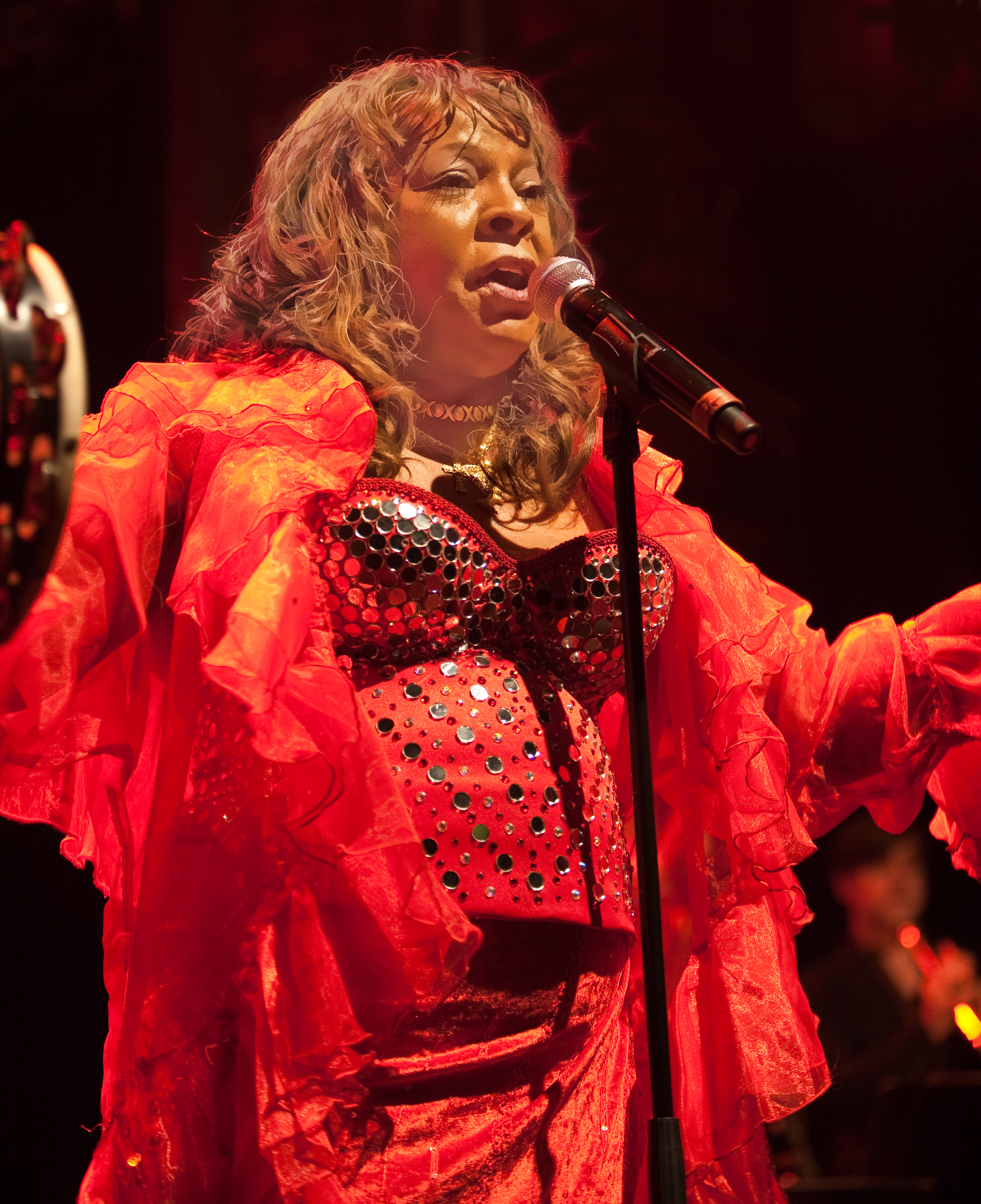
- Reeves performing in 2011

Background information
- Also known as: Martha LaVaille
- Born: Martha Rose Reeves; July 18, 1941 (age 85); Eufaula, Alabama, U.S.
- Origin: Detroit, Michigan, U.S.
- Genres: Pop; R&B; rock and roll; soul
- Occupation: Singer
- Years active: 1957–present
- Labels: Motown; MCA; Arista; Fantasy; True Life Entertainment; Ideal Entertainment

Martha Rose Reeves (born July 18, 1941) is an American singer. She is best known for being the lead singer of the Motown girl group Martha and the Vandellas, which scored several major hits on the US Billboard Hot 100 chart such as "Nowhere to Run", "Heat Wave", "Jimmy Mack", and "Dancing in the Street" among others. From 2005 until 2009, Reeves served as an elected councilwoman in her hometown of Detroit, Michigan, U.S. Martha Reeves and the Vandellas were inducted into the Rock and Roll Hall of Fame in 1995. In 2023, Rolling Stone ranked Reeves at number 151 on its list of the 200 Greatest Singers of All Time.

== Early life ==
Martha Rose Reeves was born in Eufaula, Alabama on July 18, 1941. She is the third child and eldest daughter of 11 children. She was a baby when the family moved from Eufaula to Detroit, Michigan, where her grandfather, Reverend Elijah Reeves, was a minister at Detroit's Metropolitan Church. The family was very active in the church and its choir. Elijah played guitar, and Ruby liked to sing; the children acquired their love of music from their parents. At Detroit's Northeastern High School, her vocal coach was Abraham Silver, who also worked with Florence Ballard and Mary Wilson (of the Supremes) and Bobby Rogers (of the Miracles). Raised on gospel, and inspired by singers like Lena Horne and Della Reese, Reeves became a fan of R&B and doo-wop music. She joined the Fascinations in 1959, but left the group before they became a recording act.

== Career ==
In 1957, Reeves joined a group called the Del-Phis, with Rosalind Ashford, Gloria Williams and Annette Beard. Edward "Pops" Larkins formed the Del-Phis as a sister singing group to complement his male vocal group. The Del-Phis were popular local performers.

Through 1960 and 1961, Reeves made ends meet working several jobs by day and worked as a singer in nighttime hours singing jazz and blues standards at some of Detroit's respected nightclubs. Singing at the 20 Grand, Reeves was spotted by Motown A&R director Mickey Stevenson, who gave her his business card and invited her to audition. Reeves, who used the stage name Martha Lavaille showed up at Motown's Hitsville USA studios the next morning, not knowing that she was to call to schedule an audition. Stevenson asked her to answer phones while he took care of other business. Using the skills she had learned in commercial courses in high school, Reeves answered phones, took notes, administered payroll for Motown's Funk Brothers. (Stevenson and Reeves give a different account of this in the 2019 documentary Hitsville: The Making of Motown. Directly quoting Stevenson: "She came to audition a few times. I would find nice ways of saying, 'Martha, you know, come back later.'" Reeves added, "And I must have looked like I was gonna cry or something, cos he said, 'Answer this phone. I'll be right back.' This "right back" was four hours."

Before long, Reeves was working several hours at Hitsville as Stevenson's right hand. (She also did A&R work in addition to secretarial work for Motown.) By 1961, the Del-Phis had changed their name to The Vels and recorded singles for Checker and Checkmate Records. One day, when Mary Wells could not attend a session, Reeves stepped up to the microphone and called in the Del-Phis. With "I'll Have to Let Him Go", Martha and the Vandellas was born. Then, when the Andantes could not make a session to back the Miracles' drummer on songs he was recording, Martha called her groupmates. The ladies (a trio after Williams' departure) provided backup vocals for Marvin Gaye's "Stubborn Kind of Fellow". The single became a hit. Martha and the Vandellas backed Gaye on his first three singles, his first album, and on stage—even after they had their own hits.

That story is told a bit differently in the film Hitsville. According to Berry Gordy, Motown routinely recorded without a singer present, in violation of union rules: "We were recording sometimes tracks without the singer, and according to the Union, you had to have a singer singing it live. You couldn't do tracks in those days." A union representative made a surprise visit, and Berry said, "Everybody went crazy, saying, 'Well, you're doing a session in there and the union guy is coming.' We told Mickey, 'Man, we've got to put somebody on the mic.' His secretary overheard it....Then she grabbed the mic and started singing it, and she was Martha."

=== Martha and the Vandellas ===
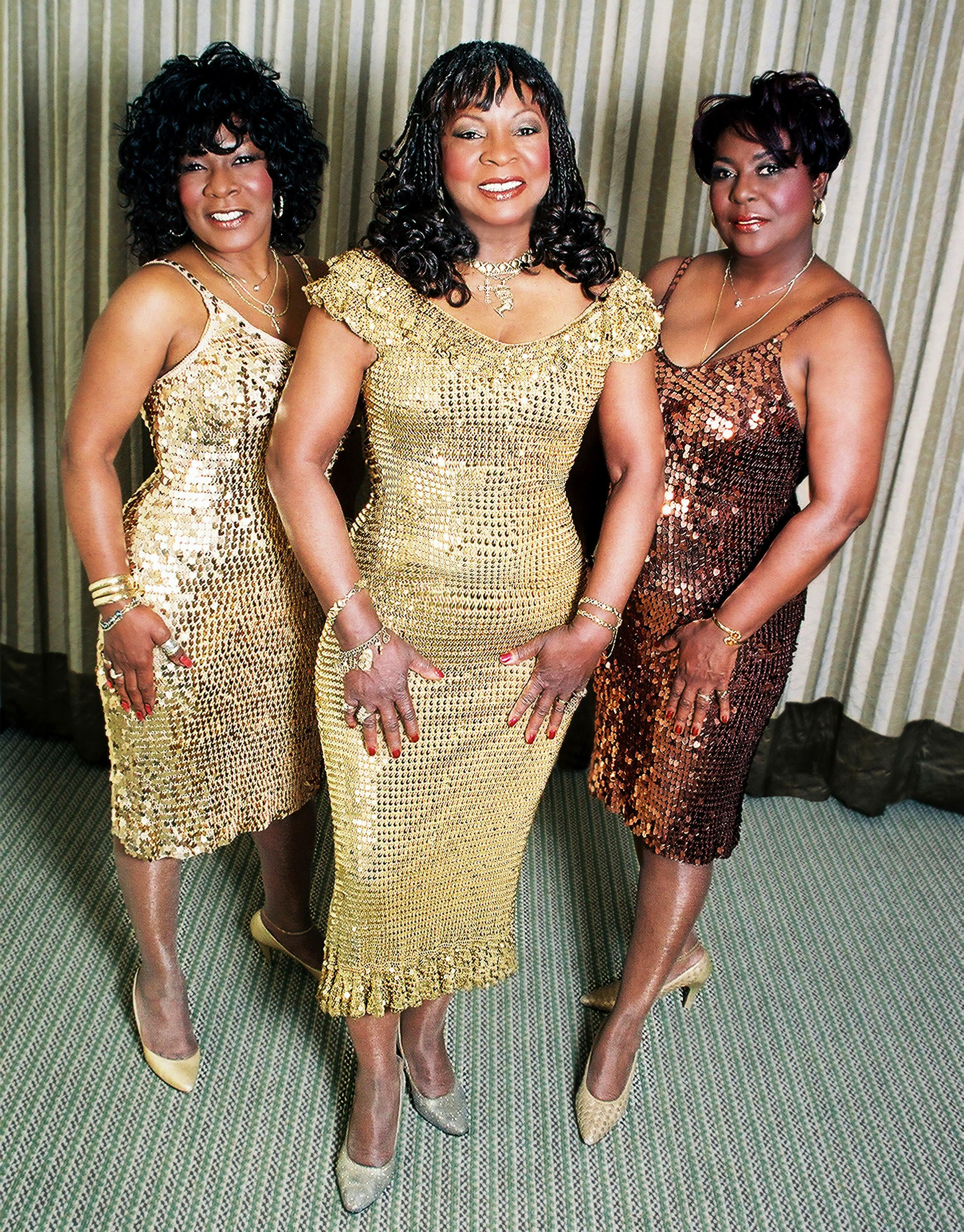
Lois, Martha and Delphine in 2004

With her brassy and gospel-reared vocals, Martha Reeves helped Martha and the Vandellas ascend from background singers with early songs such as "Come and Get These Memories" and "Heat Wave", distinguishing the group from contemporaries and labelmates the Marvelettes, who preceded them, and the Supremes, who followed them.

After "Heat Wave" became the group's first million-seller, Martha and the Vandellas quickly rose to become one of the label's top draws both as recording stars and as a successful live act. Martha was the one consistent member of the group staying throughout all the group's incarnations and lineups. After the exits of original members Annette Beard and Rosalind Ashford, members replacing them included Betty Kelly, Sandra Tilley (both formerly of the Velvelettes) and one of Martha's sisters, Lois Reeves. Among the singles released that became signature hits for the group are "Quicksand", "In My Lonely Room", "Live Wire", "Nowhere to Run", "A Love Like Yours (Don't Come Knocking Everyday)", "I'm Ready for Love", "Jimmy Mack", "Honey Chile" and the group's most popular single, "Dancing in the Street". Their television appearances included The Mike Douglas Show, The Joey Bishop Show, American Bandstand, Where the Action Is, Shindig, Swingin' Time, Soul Train, The Ed Sullivan Show, and with British soul singer Dusty Springfield, on the UK show Ready Steady Go!

The group was also featured in major magazine articles in Johnson Publishing Corp. publications including Hep, Ebony and Jet, and in the newspaper Soul and the magazine Soul Illustrated. Reeves was also an early contributing writer for Soul.

When original member Rosalind Ashford left in 1968, Reeves recruited Sandra Tilley and the lineup of Martha and Lois Reeves and Tilley continued until 1972 when the group disbanded shortly after issuing the album Black Magic. In 1972, after Motown moved from Detroit to Los Angeles, Reeves negotiated out of her contract, ending her tenure with the label.

In 1989, Reeves, Rosalind Ashford, and Annette Beard filed a lawsuit against Motown Records for royalties on the group's records not received since 1972. The company reached a settlement with the women in 1991. Berry Gordy, Jr. apologized to Reeves for the length of time in reaching the agreement and the terms of the settlement were not made public.

=== Solo career ===
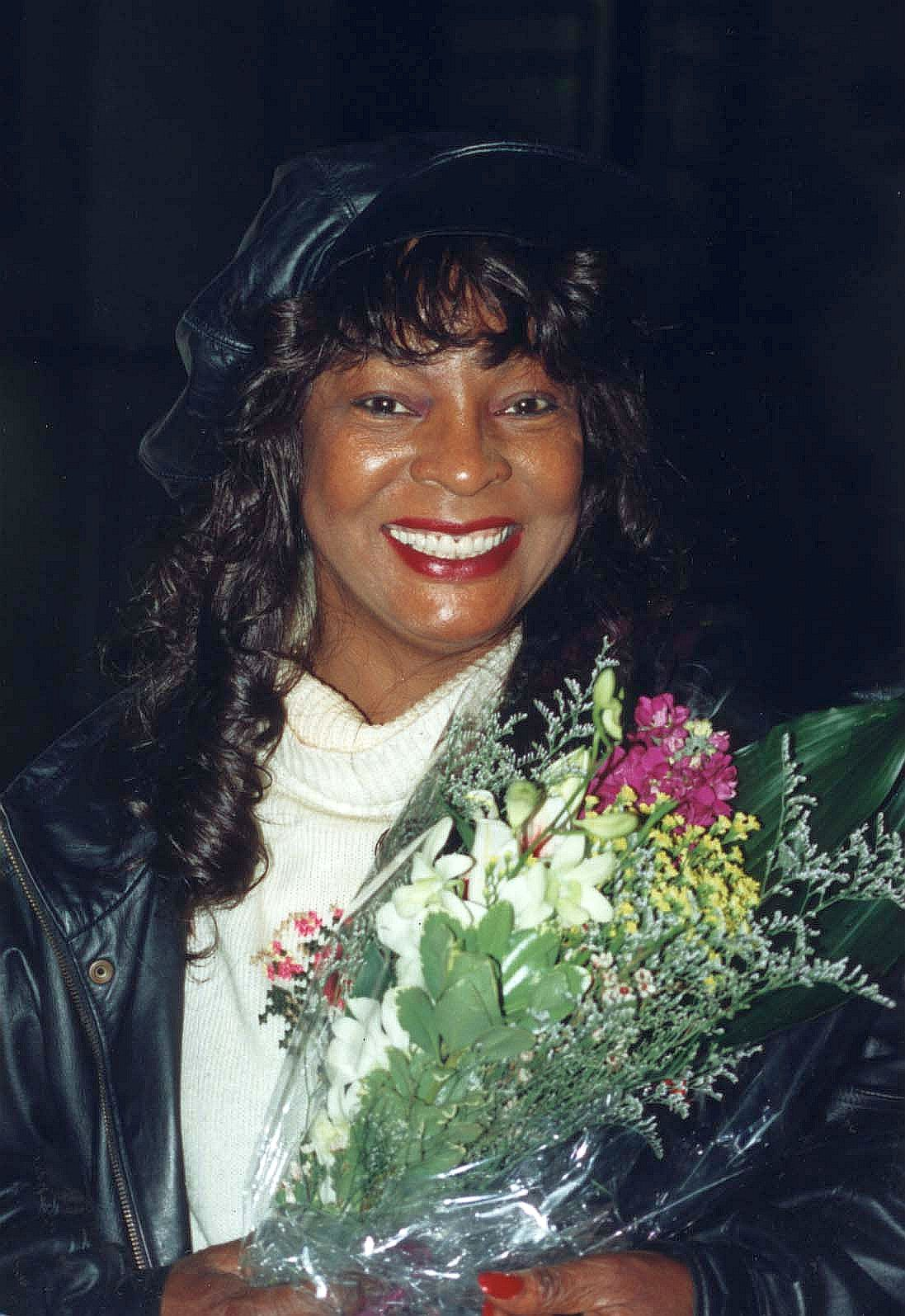
Reeves in 1996

After leaving Motown and moving to Los Angeles, Reeves was signed by MCA by late 1973. Her first project, released in January 1974, was the soundtrack for the blaxploitation film Willie Dynamite with jazz trombonist J. J. Johnson. In the summer of the year, MCA released her self-titled album, produced by Richard Perry. It was reportedly the most expensive album of that time, costing $250,000, and featuring other star musicians including Billy Preston, Joe Sample and James Taylor. Despite positive reviews, it failed to generate commercial success as did Reeves' subsequent follow-ups on other labels including Arista and Fantasy. Reviewing in Christgau's Record Guide: Rock Albums of the Seventies (1981), Robert Christgau said, "This attempted masterpiece doesn't make it because Richard Perry has failed the fundamental test of the interpretive producer—matching performer and material. To an extent, this is Reeves's fault—her gorgeous voice has trouble gripping complicated ideas."

She appeared as a musical guest on the first season of Saturday Night Live (hosted by Candice Bergen) in December 1975, performing the Christmas standard "Silver Bells" and a cover version of Jackie Wilson's "(Your Love Keeps Lifting Me) Higher and Higher".

In Los Angeles, Reeves took acting classes at the Lee Strasberg Institute. She appeared in the movie Fairy Tales and on the television series Quincy, ME. Reeves also appeared on TV game shows such as Hollywood Squares. In 1977, with the help of former Motown producer Frank Wilson, Reeves became a born-again Christian, joining the Mt. Zion Missionary Baptist Church, pastored by Reverend EV Hill. She released one album on Arista Records, working with Clive Davis, the Chairmen of the Board's General Johnson and others, and two albums on Fantasy Records, working with other former Motown colleagues Hank Cosby and Holland, Dozier and Holland. In 1983, she performed solo on the Motown 25 special. She then performed in a Broadway production of Ain't Misbehavin' and reunited with original members of the Vandellas in 1989 both on record (recording for the London-based Motorcity Records that year issuing the single "Step into My Shoes") and on tour. In 1995, Reeves and the Vandellas were inducted to the Rock & Roll Hall of Fame and were inducted to the Vocal Group Hall of Fame in 2003. Reeves performed as part of the halftime show of Super Bowl XXXII in 1998, with her sisters (and Vandellas), Lois and Delphine Reeves.

In 2004, Reeves released her first album in 24 years, Home to You, with songs she wrote and produced herself except for a Billie Holiday cover and an updated version of "Jimmy Mack". Between leaving the Vandellas and her solo career, Martha served as an early contributor to the music newspaper, Soul, for which she was honored for by the Black Women in Publishing organization. She was also honored for her best-selling 1995 autobiography, Dancing in the Street.

"Wild Night" was featured on the soundtrack to the feature Thelma & Louise. Reeves has sometimes opened her live performances with this number. "Nowhere to Run" is the first record played by Robin Williams’ character, Adrian Cronauer, in the movie Good Morning, Vietnam. Her solo television appearances include The Midnight Special (1974), Soul Train (1971 and 1974), Don Kirschner's Rock Concert (1972), The Dennis Miller Show (1987) (singing "Georgia On My Mind" with James Brown), VH-1's Divas Celebrate Soul, singing her 1965 hit "Nowhere To Run" backed by singers Marsha Ambrosius and Sharon Jones of the Dap-Kings; on Jimmy Kimmel Live! with the Crystal Method and Brain from Nine Inch Nails, Rob Fortus from Guns N' Roses and Darryl Jones from the Rolling Stones, and on Dancing With the Stars with the Temptations and Smokey Robinson. That same week she was back on the music charts with a recording entitled "I'm Not Leaving" with the Crystal Method.

In January 2012, Reeves held court at London's Ronnie Scott's Jazz Club with a sold out six-show stand that drew celebrity guests like Phil Collins and Boy George. Other recent appearances include Carnegie Hall, the Blue Note (Milan, Italy), the Howard Theater (Washington, DC), the Dakota Jazz Club (Minneapolis), BB King Blues Club (NYC), the Cheltenhem Jazz Festival and the Mouth of the Tyne Festival. In November 2015, just weeks after the terrorist bombings in Brussels and Paris, Reeves and her co-horts embarked on a sold-out tour of clubs and theatres in the city of lights and throughout Belgium.

Reeves received an honorary PhD in Humanities on November 25, 2012, in Detroit.

In August 2016, Martha Reeves and the Vandellas were presented in concert at London's Hippodrome, where various Motown artists recorded live albums in the 1960s and 1970s.

=== Current work ===
After serving on the Detroit City Council from 2005 to 2009, Reeves returned to full-time performing with nearly 50 shows annually, including a major tour of Australia in 2010. She regularly appears at festivals in the UK during the summer, and for her performances was nominated for two UK Festival Awards, as "Best Headliner" and "Feel Good Act of the Summer".

Reeves is a board member of SAG-AFTRA Detroit chapter. In 2007, she testified before Congress on behalf of musicians, session singers and recording artists for better wages and royalties. She was honored for her hard work and courage in 2007 by delegates and members of AFTRA. She is also on the board of SoundExchange, a non-profit performance rights organization that collects royalties on behalf of sound recording copyright owners and featured artists for non-interactive digital transmissions, including satellite and internet radio.

She made a cameo appearance in the film Tenacious D in The Pick of Destiny, as a passer-by listening to the duo on the boardwalk. This information was revealed in the film's DVD audio commentary by Kyle Gass.

Martha continues to perform concerts and club dates both solo and with her Vandellas—sisters Lois (Motown-era Vandella since 1967) and Delphine (since mid-1980s).

In September 2019, Martha was one of the celebrity contestants taking part on the BBC One show Celebrity MasterChef in the UK.

In 2024, Martha received a star on The Hollywood Walk of Fame, with Berry Gordy Jr., Smokey Robinson, Stevie Wonder, and others paying tribute at the event.

In May 2026, Reeves announced a new album entitled Searching would be released later that year; her first in 22 years.

In August 2026, Reeves performed "The Star-Spangled Banner" before the inaugural Women’s Professional Baseball League (WPBL) game between the Los Angeles Queens and the New York Heights in Springfield, Illinois.

== Discography ==
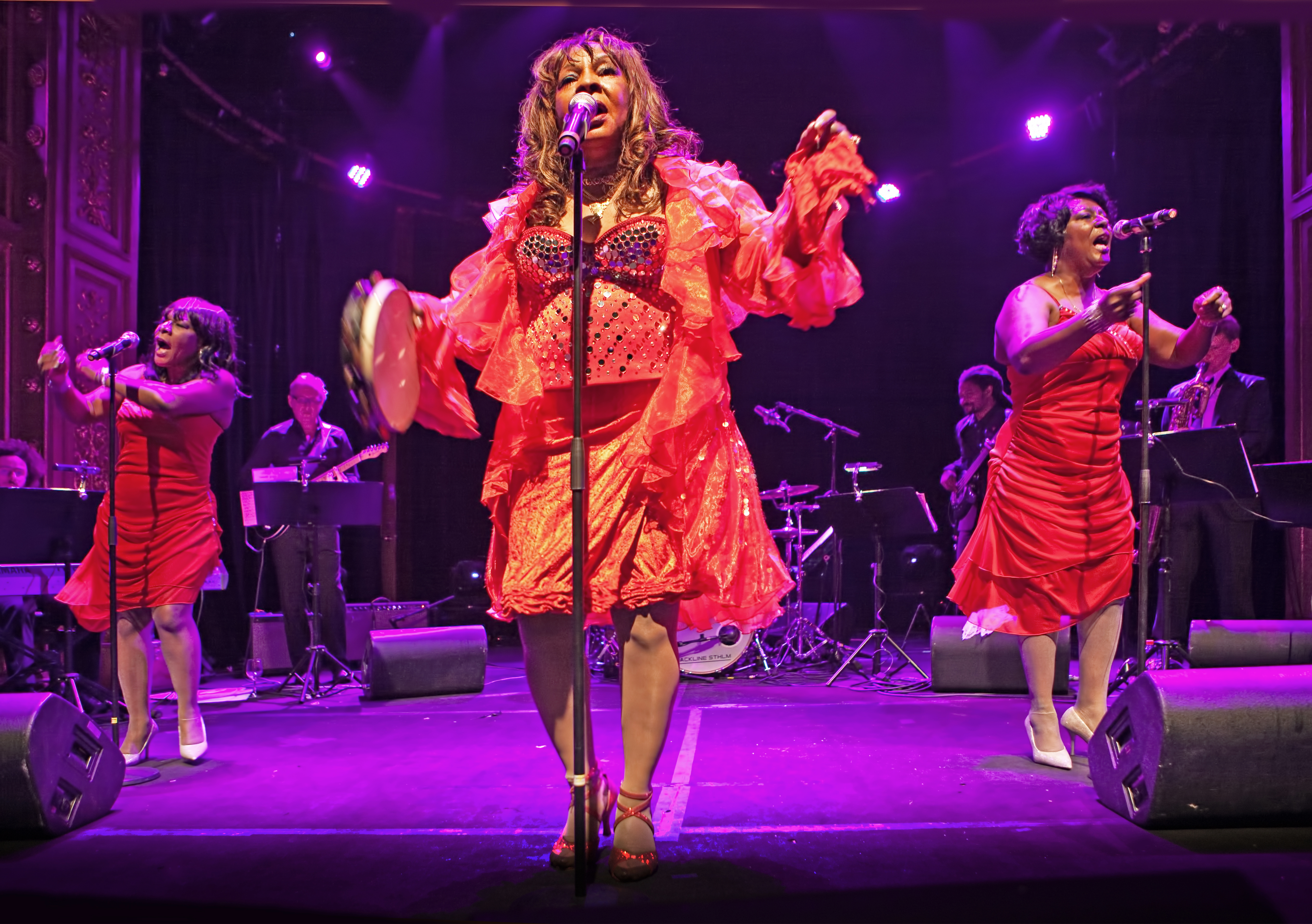
Martha and the Vandellas, 2011

Studio albums

- Martha Reeves (1974)
- Rainbow (1975)
- The Rest of My Life (1976)
- We Meet Again (1978)
- Gotta Keep Moving (1980)
- Home To You (2004)
- Searching (2026)
