= Robert White (guitarist) =

American musician (1936–1994)

- White in the 1960s

Background information
- Born: November 19, 1936; Billmeyer, Pennsylvania, U.S.
- Died: October 27, 1994 (aged 57) Los Angeles, California, U.S.
- Genres: R&B; soul
- Occupation: Musician
- Instrument: Guitar
- Years active: 1950s–1980s
- Formerly of: The Funk Brothers

Robert White (November 19, 1936 – October 27, 1994) was an American soul musician and a guitarist for Motown's in-house studio band, the Funk Brothers.

Born in the small town of Billmeyer, Pennsylvania, he received music lessons from his uncle. He toured with the Moonglows and played bass prior to making Detroit his home in 1960. He did session work at Anna Records and later became one of the three core guitarists at Motown, along with Joe Messina and Eddie Willis. There, he performed primarily as a rhythm guitarist and played lead guitar when particular melodies needed his distinct tone. He is best known for writing and performing the guitar riff on the Temptations' number-one hit single "My Girl", and performed on numerous Motown hits, including "How Sweet It Is (to Be Loved by You)" and "What's Going On" by Marvin Gaye, "You Keep Me Hangin' On" by the Supremes, and "My Cherie Amour" by Stevie Wonder.

Oscar Moore and Wes Montgomery were among White's influences. Among the guitars White used to record were the Gibson ES 335 and the Gibson L-5.

White moved to Los Angeles in the mid-1970s. He toured with he Temptations in 1980s and co-owned a recording studio. He died of complications from open heart surgery in October 1994 at age 57. He is featured in the 2002 documentary film Standing in the Shadows of Motown.
