= Joe Hunter (musician) =

American musician (1927–2007)

Background information
- Born: Joseph Edward Hunter; November 19, 1927; Jackson, Tennessee, U.S.
- Died: February 2, 2007 (aged 79) Detroit, Michigan, U.S.
- Genres: R&B; soul; pop; jazz
- Occupation: Musician
- Instrument: Keyboards
- Years active: c. 1950–2007
- Formerly of: The Funk Brothers

Joseph Edward Hunter (November 19, 1927 – February 2, 2007) was an American musician and keyboardist, known for his recording session work with Motown Records' in-house studio band, the Funk Brothers. One of the original Funk Brothers, Hunter served as band director from 1959 until 1964, when he left Motown and was replaced by Earl Van Dyke.

== Life and career ==
Hunter was born in Jackson, Tennessee, to Vada Idona Hunter and John G. Hunter. His mother was a piano teacher and he started playing piano at an early age. At age 11, the family moved to Detroit. He was drafted into the army where he played in the jazz band alongside pianist Dwike Mitchell and drummer Elvin Jones. Hunter was influenced by the music of Art Tatum, Sergei Rachmaninoff, and Nat King Cole. After the service, he performed in Detroit jazz clubs and toured with The Midnighters.

In 1958 he was recruited by Motown Records, at the time a newly founded label. He led the record label's studio band, The Funk Brothers, and was instrumental in recruiting many of its musicians, such as James Jamerson and later Earl Van Dyke. During his tenure at Motown he performed on many of the label's hits such as "Pride and Joy" by Marvin Gaye, "Heat Wave" and "Come and Get These Memories" by Martha and the Vandellas, "Do You Love Me" by The Contours, and "Way Over There" and "Shop Around" (Note: Sources credit Joe Hunter as the pianist on The Miracles' hit single "Shop Around". Gerald Posner credits Berry Gordy as the pianist on the final recording of the song.) by The Miracles.

He left Motown in 1964 and pursued a career as a freelance arranger and musician. Although his time with Motown and Funk Brothers was short, his keyboard playing was integral to the "Motown Sound". He left a lasting impression on future Motown session musicians and artists such as Stevie Wonder.

After Motown, he continued to produce and arrange for various artists. He worked with record labels Golden World and Fortune and artists Bobby “Blue” Bland, Junior Parker, Edwin Starr, Jimmy Ruffin and others. He was involved with Pied Piper Productions, and he was affiliated with artists Dennis Edwards, The Hesitations, Freddy Butler and John Lee Hooker.

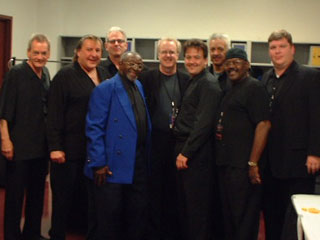
Joe Hunter (4th from left) as part of the reincarnated touring Funk Brothers in 2006

In 1996 he authored an autobiography titled Musicians, Motown, and Myself: The Dawn of a New Sound. In 2002 the Funk Brothers, including Hunter, were featured in the documentary film Standing in the Shadows of Motown. The film highlighted the contribution of Motown's session musicians to the label's success and musical output. The soundtrack of the film won two Grammys and the Funk Brothers received a Grammy for Lifetime Achievement in 2004. From 2002 to 2007 several of the surviving Funk Brothers, including Hunter, toured as a musical group.

In his later years, Hunter continued to perform as a musician in the Detroit area. He died of natural causes on February 2, 2007, at the age of 79. He was survived by his son Joe Hunter Jr., his daughter and grandchildren. He is interred at Detroit's Mt. Olivet Cemetery. (Note: Listed on source website as "Joseph Hunter Sr", search under "Joseph Hunter")

== Bibliography ==
- Joe Hunter (1996). Musicians, Motown, and Myself: The Dawn of a New Sound. Detroit: Global Sound Publications. OCLC 1049712252.
