= Rosalind Ashford =

American singer (1943–2026)

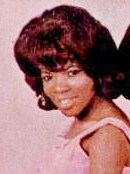
- Ashford in 1965

Background information
- Born: September 2, 1943; Detroit, Michigan, U.S.
- Died: September 15, 2026 (aged 83) Detroit, Michigan, U.S.
- Genres: R&B, doo-wop, rock and roll, soul
- Occupation: Singer
- Formerly of: Martha and the Vandellas

Rosalind Ashford-Holmes (September 2, 1943 – September 15, 2026) was an American soprano R&B and soul singer, known for her work as an original member of the Motown singing group Martha and the Vandellas.

== Early years ==
Rosalind Ashford was born in Detroit, Michigan, on September 2, 1943, to John and Mary Ashford. She sang in church choirs and learned to dance in local centers. Developing a passion for music, she joined the glee club and mixed choruses while attending Wilbur Wright High School. According to Ashford, in 1957 her mother and sister helped land her an audition at a local Detroit YMCA club, where a man named Edward "Pops" Larkins recruited her, Annette Beard and Gloria Williams to form a sister group to a male vocal group. Martha Reeves, contrary to belief, was not an original member of The Del-Phis, as she was a member of another group. Reeves would not join until 1960.

Naming themselves The Del-Phis, the group performed in local benefit parties throughout Detroit and performed at YMCA parties and high school functions before the group became serious about music around 1960 shortly after Reeves joined the group. The following year, they released "I'll Let You Know" on the Chess Records label subsidiary Checkmate. The record did not go anywhere and two follow-up records where they changed their name to The Vels including "Camel Walk" and "There He Is (At My Door)" also failed to bring any national interest to the group. The group later became Marvin Gaye's background singers on hit singles such as "Stubborn Kind of Fellow" and "Hitch Hike".

After Reeves recruited Ashford, Williams, and Beard to back her on a demo record intended for Mary Wells titled "I Have to Let Him Go", Motown president Berry Gordy offered Reeves, who was then holding a secretarial job for the label, a recording contract for herself and her background singing partners. Choosing the name Martha and the Vandellas, the group signed to Motown in September 1962 and issued what had been intended as a demo recording for their first single.

== Martha and the Vandellas ==
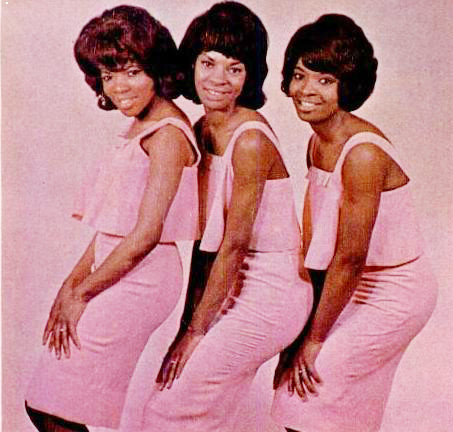
Ashford (left) with Martha Reeves (middle) and Betty Kelly as Martha and the Vandellas in 1965

Following a successful performance while performing at the Motortown Revue, the Vandellas scored a moderate hit on the Hot 100 and a major R&B hit with their second single, "Come and Get These Memories". The song, one of the first major compositions by the team of Holland-Dozier-Holland, charted at the top ten of the American R&B singles chart. The group's second hit, "(Love Is Like a) Heat Wave", helped the group to distinguish themselves from the other girl groups on the label, such as The Supremes and Marvelettes, by showing they were capable of rougher, brassier, and grittier sounds.

After "Quicksand" gave the group a third top forty pop hit, Beard left to start a family with her new spouse. Reeves recruited a former member of the Velvelettes, Betty Kelly, to replace her.

With Kelly, the group continued their success with signature songs "Dancing in the Street", "Nowhere to Run", "I'm Ready for Love", and "Jimmy Mack". Ashford remained in the group when Kelly was replaced by Martha's sister Lois Reeves in 1967, but finally left in 1969. She was replaced by yet another Velvelette, Sandra Tilley. Ashford married (last name, Holmes) and began a career with the local Detroit telephone company. In the mid-1980s, she reunited with Martha and Beard for a UK tour and recordings on Ian Levine's Motor City Records. In 2005, the three performed in Atlantic City at the Vocal Group Hall of Fame induction ceremonies and a week later in the Baltimore/Washington area. Ashford-Holmes and Beard periodically performed as The Original Vandellas.

== Later years ==
In 1978, Ashford joined Reeves and Beard in a reunion performance for a benefit concert for actor Will Geer. Eleven years later, the three original Vandellas recorded the single, "Step Into My Shoes" for the London-based Motorcity Records label. Ashford and Beard continued to perform, often billing themselves as The Original Vandellas, with lead vocalist Roschelle Laughhunn, rarely reuniting with Reeves. In 1995, Ashford was inducted to the Rock & Roll Hall of Fame as a member of Martha and the Vandellas.

Ashford died in the Redford suburb of Detroit, on September 15, 2026, at the age of 83.
