= Annette Beard =

American singer

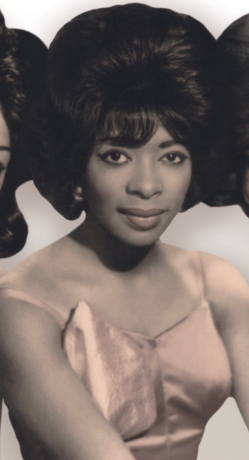
- Annette Beard in 1962

Background information
- Also known as: Annette Helton, Annette Sterling, Annette Simmons
- Born: Annette Beard; July 4, 1943 (age 83)
- Origin: Detroit, Michigan, U.S.
- Genres: R&B, doo-wop, rock'n'roll, soul, funk, disco
- Occupation: Singer
- Years active: 1957–present

Annette Beard, also known as Annette Helton or Annette Sterling (born July 4, 1943) is an American R&B and soul singer. Beard is best known for her work with Motown and as an original member of the singing group Martha and the Vandellas during the 1960s. Beard is currently known as a member of the singing group The Original Vandellas.

== Early years ==
Born on July 4, 1943, in Detroit, Michigan to Ann and Roger El Wood Beard, Annette started singing in church choirs at an early age. When she was fourteen, she was discovered by a man named Edward "Pops" Larkins, who was holding auditions for a female group at the local YMCA to complement a male group he had started.

Fourteen-year-old Annette impressed him with a single note and she joined friends Rosalind Ashford and Gloria Williams to form the original version of The Del-Phis in 1957. The group performed at local get-togethers, high school parties, YMCA benefits and lawn parties. Annette, who was a shy girl growing up, did not mind singing background behind Gloria Williams, then the original lead singer of the group. Fellow Detroit singer Martha Reeves would replace a departing fourth member in 1960. In 1961, Annette graduated from Southeastern High School and Rosalind Ashford graduated from Wilbur Wright High School that same year. With graduation behind them, it was time for serious considerations of their options and what the future held for them.

After changing their name to The Vels, the group recorded for local Motown subsidiaries Mel-O-Dy and Tamla usually singing background for local Detroit acts such as The Elgins' Saundra Mallett. In 1962, frustrated by the group's slow development and sensing a break-up, Williams left the group. Afterwards, Annette, Martha and Rosalind sang together on Marvin Gaye's hits "Stubborn Kind of Fellow", "Hitch Hike" and "Pride and Joy".

After replacing Mary Wells and The Andantes on a refuted session with a demonstration record for a Mickey Stevenson song, Motown president Berry Gordy suggested the girls to sign a contract as a recording group. With Reeves as the confirmed lead singer, the name Vandellas was chosen with the final name being Martha and the Vandellas.

== Career ==
=== Martha and the Vandellas ===
Signing to Motown Records' new Gordy subsidiary, Martha and the Vandellas gained a stature as hitmakers in the label almost as quickly after they were signed, boosted by their powerful backing behind Marvin's hit singles, their second single, "Come and Get These Memories", written by the fabled team of Holland-Dozier-Holland, became the group's first hit success.

Distinguishing themselves from the two-lead format/traditional girl group pop sound of The Marvelettes and the doo-wop sensibilities of The Supremes, Martha and the Vandellas employed a much rougher and sharper sound influenced by gospel. The group's third hit, "(Love Is Like A) Heat Wave", further established the group as recording stars. A third single, "Quicksand", continued that rise in late 1963. The Vandellas' sound was unique because of the difference in sounds between the three women: with Reeves' brassy alto leading the group, Rosalind Ashford Holmes provided the high vocals in her soprano voice while Beard provided the lower vocals in her contralto delivery making for an interesting and commercial sound.

But Beard's rise to fame was overshadowed by a romance. Within a few months, Beard announced she was engaged and pregnant with her first child. Coming to grasp with wanting to stay in the group but also wanting to have a life of a married woman and mother, Beard opted to leave the group in June, 1964. Her last recording session with the group was the "Jimmy Mack / 3rd Finger Left Hand" session on June 18, 1964. Beard was replaced by former Velvelettes member Betty Kelly when she "retired" to care for her family and work for St John's Hospital in her native Detroit.

== Later years ==
Having remained in touch with her former bandmates, Helton soon found herself back in the public eye following a reunion with Reeves and Ashford during a benefit concert for actor Will Geer in Los Angeles. In the mid-1980s, she and Rosalind filed suit against Motown for back royalties; several years before Reeves would do the same. Sensing a return to performing, she reunited again with Reeves and Ashford, releasing the "Heat Wave"-styled pop of "Step into My Shoes" in 1989. This reunion lead to several tours across the US and UK. In 1995, Beard joined Reeves, Ashford, Betty Kelly and Lois Reeves, as Martha and the Vandellas were inducted to the Rock & Roll Hall of Fame.

In 2005, after 30 years of employment in the outpatient lab of Saint John's Hospital, Beard retired.

As of 2011, Helton and Ashford separated from Reeves and continue perform all over the world as "The Original Vandellas" with, most notably Mary Wilson of the Supremes, Pat Lewis, and Roschelle Laughhunn.

In 2006, Helton and Holmes appeared as the "Bingo Mamas" in the musical comedy "Father Bingo" which premiered at the Detroit Music Hall Center.

In 2023, Helton and Holmes (with Laughhunn) provided backup vocals for the single "Vandellas Dance" with lead by Mark Scott from The Miracles.

As of 2025, Helton (now known as Annette Sterling) appears with E. Young and Company.

Annette resides in Ashland, Ohio, with her husband, Dann Simmons, and has two children, Derek and Michelle and one granddaughter.
