= The Funk Brothers =

Group of Detroit-based Motown studio musicians

- Funk Brothers in early 1960s. Left to right: Benny Benjamin, James Jamerson, Joe Hunter, Larry Veeder, Henry Cosby, Mike Terry

Background information
- Origin: Detroit, Michigan, United States
- Genres: Soul, funk, R&B
- Years active: 1959–1972
- Label: Motown
- Members: NARAS membership Richard "Pistol" Allen; Jack Ashford; Bob Babbitt; Benny Benjamin; Eddie "Bongo" Brown; Johnny Griffith; Joe Hunter; James Jamerson; Uriel Jones; Joe Messina; Earl Van Dyke; Robert White; Eddie Willis

The Funk Brothers were a group of Detroit-based session musicians who performed the backing to most Motown recordings from 1959 until the company moved to Los Angeles in 1972.

Its members are considered among the most successful groups of studio musicians in music history. Among their hits are "My Girl", "I Heard It Through the Grapevine", "Baby Love", " I Was Made to Love Her", "Papa Was a Rollin' Stone", "The Tears of a Clown", "Ain't No Mountain High Enough", and "Heat Wave". Some combination of the members played on each of Motown's 100-plus U.S. R&B number one singles and 50-plus U.S. Pop number ones released from 1961 to 1972.

There is no undisputed list of the members of the group. While some writers have used the term "Funk Brothers" broadly to refer to nearly every musician who performed on a Motown recording, it more commonly refers to the core group of recurring studio musicians active during Motown’s Detroit era. There are 13 Funk Brothers identified in Paul Justman's 2002 documentary film Standing in the Shadows of Motown, based on Allan Slutsky's book of the same name. These 13 members were identified by NARAS for the Grammy Lifetime Achievement Award and were recognized with a star on the Hollywood Walk of Fame.

In 2007, the Funk Brothers were inducted into the Musicians Hall of Fame and Museum.

== History ==
Early members included bandleader Joe Hunter and Earl Van Dyke (piano and organ); Clarence Isabell (double bass); James Jamerson (bass guitar and double bass); Benny "Papa Zita" Benjamin and Richard "Pistol" Allen (drums); Mike Terry (baritone saxophone); Paul Riser (trombone); Robert White, Eddie Willis, and Joe Messina (guitar); Jack Ashford (tambourine, percussion, vibraphone, marimba); Jack Brokensha (vibraphone, marimba); and Eddie "Bongo" Brown (percussion). Hunter left in 1964, replaced on keyboards by Johnny Griffith and as bandleader by Van Dyke. Uriel Jones joined the band as a third drummer. Late-era bassist Bob Babbitt and guitarist Dennis Coffey both joined the ensemble in 1966.

While most of Motown's backing musicians were African American, and many originally from Detroit, the Funk Brothers included white players as well, such as Messina (who was the featured guitarist on Soupy Sales's nighttime jazz TV show in the 1950s), Brokensha (originally from Australia), Coffey, and Pittsburgh-born Babbitt.

=== Fame and Funk Brothers name ===
Unlike their Stax Records backing-band contemporaries Booker T. & the M.G.'s in Memphis, until the release of the Standing in the Shadows of Motown documentary, the members of the Funk Brothers were little known. Studio musicians were not credited by Motown until Marvin Gaye's What's Going On in 1971, although Motown released a handful of singles and LPs by Earl Van Dyke. The Funk Brothers shared billing with Van Dyke on some recordings, although they were billed as "Earl Van Dyke & the Soul Brothers", since Motown CEO Berry Gordy, Jr. disliked the word "funk".

Alternatively, the name "Funk Brothers" could have been given to the band ex post facto; the term "funky" as an adjective came to be associated with uptempo and backbeat, Southern-styled soul music in the second half of the 1960s; the term "funk" as a noun is typically associated with uptempo soul music from the 1970s onwards. In the Standing in the Shadows of Motown documentary, Joe Hunter stated that the name "The Funk Brothers" came from Benny Benjamin. Hunter said that Benjamin was leaving the studio (known as the "Snake Pit", due to all the cable runs out of the ceiling) after session work, paused on the stairs, turned and said to his fellow musicians, "You all are the Funk Brothers." The band was then informally named.

The Funk Brothers often moonlighted for other labels, recording in Detroit and elsewhere, in bids to augment their Motown salaries. It became a worst-kept secret that Jackie Wilson's 1967 hit "(Your Love Keeps Lifting Me) Higher and Higher" did not have a Motown influence quite by accident—the Funk Brothers migrated to do the Wilson session, in an interesting reference to Motown's early history: Berry Gordy, Jr got his first music break by getting Wilson to record some of his songs (including "Reet Petite") in the 1950s. Various Funk Brothers also appeared on such non-Motown hits as The San Remo Golden Strings "Hungry For Love", "Cool Jerk" (the Capitols), "Agent Double-O Soul" (Edwin Starr, before that singer joined Motown itself), "(I Just Wanna) Testify" by the Parliaments, "Band Of Gold" (Freda Payne), "Give Me Just a Little More Time" (The Chairmen of the Board), and blues musician John Lee Hooker's "Boom Boom". After he found out about the Edwin Starr session, Gordy fined members of the Funk Brothers band for moonlighting for another label; Eddie Wingate, owner of the Ric-Tic and Golden World labels, which released Starr's "Agent Double-O Soul", subsequently attended that year's Motown staff Christmas party and personally gave each of the fined session players double the amount of the fine in cash, on the spot. Gordy eventually bought out Wingate's label and his entire artist roster.

=== Dissolution ===
During the mid- to late-1960s, one-fifth of Motown records began using session musicians based in Los Angeles, usually covers and tributes of mainstream pop songs and showtunes. By 1970, Motown sessions were increasingly scheduled in Los Angeles instead of Detroit, including all of those for the Jackson 5's hit recordings. Nevertheless, Motown producers such as Norman Whitfield, Frank Wilson, Marvin Gaye, and Smokey Robinson steadfastly continued to record in Detroit.

The Funk Brothers were dismissed in 1972, when Berry Gordy moved the entire Motown label to Los Angeles; a development some of the musicians discovered only from a notice on the studio door. A few members, including Jamerson, followed to the West Coast, but found the environment uncomfortable. For many of the L.A. recordings, members of the Wrecking Crew worked for Motown, including drummer Earl Palmer, percussionist Gary Coleman, bassist Carol Kaye, guitarist Tommy Tedesco, and keyboardist Larry Knechtel.

=== Later years ===
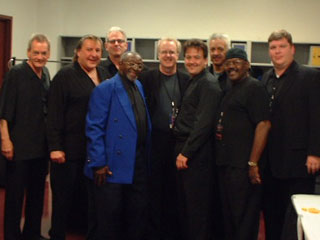
The Funk Brothers as reincarnated in 2006. The lineup includes three of the original members: Bob Babbitt (2nd from left), Joe Hunter (4th from left), Uriel Jones (8th from left).

In February 2004, surviving members of the Funk Brothers were presented the Grammy Legend Award at the 46th Annual Grammy Awards at the Staples Center in Los Angeles in March 2006, some remaining Funk Brothers were invited to perform on Philadelphia writer-producer-singer Phil Hurtt's recording session at Studio A, Dearborn Heights, Detroit, where they contributed their performances to "The Soulful Tale of Two Cities" project. The double-album sleeve notes read: "Motown's legendary Funk Brothers and members of Philadelphia's world renowned MFSB take you 'back in the day' with an album filled with classic Philly and Motown hits." Bob Babbitt, Joe Hunter, Uriel Jones, and Eddie Willis performed alongside other notable Detroit session musicians, like Ray Monette, Robert Jones, Spider Webb, and Treaty Womack. The musicians played on the Philly hits, giving their unique Detroit interpretations of the songs under the leadership of Phil Hurtt, Bobby Eli, Clay McMurray and Lamont Dozier. Many other ex-Motown and Detroit artists performed vocals on the session, including the Velvelettes, Carolyn Crawford, Lamont Dozier, Bobby Taylor, Kim Weston, Freda Payne, and George Clinton.

In 2008, Ashford and Riser played on Raphael Saadiq's album The Way I See It, recorded in the style of the Motown Sound. That same year, the Funk Brothers' surviving members recorded Live in Orlando, an album and video.

In 2010, surviving members of the Funk Brothers accompanied Phil Collins on his Motown covers album, Going Back, and appear in the live Going Back concert DVD.

In 2010, the Funk Brothers were voted into the Michigan Rock and Roll Legends Hall of Fame.

== Awards and recognition ==
The Funk Brothers have received three Grammy awards:

- Lifetime Achievement Award in 2004
- Best Traditional R&B Performance for "What's Going On" with Chaka Khan, 2002
- Best Compilation Soundtrack Album For A Motion Picture, Television Or Other Visual Media for Standing in the Shadows of Motown, 2002.

Bassist James Jamerson was inducted into the Rock and Roll Hall of Fame in 2000, and drummer Benny Benjamin in 2003. In 2003, surviving members were invited to the White House to meet President George W. Bush, Secretary of State Colin Powell, and National Security Advisor Condoleezza Rice, in an event tied to Black History Month.

In 2007, the Funk Brothers were inducted into the Musicians Hall of Fame and Museum in Nashville. On March 21, 2013, the Funk Brothers were honored with a star on the Hollywood Walk of Fame. In August 2014, the Funk Brothers were inducted into the Rhythm and Blues Hall Of Fame at the induction ceremony, which was held in Canton, Ohio that year.

== Members ==
The name "The Funk Brothers" was a loosely applied designation. The National Academy of Recording Arts and Sciences recognizes 13 musicians as official "Funk Brothers", but the name is often casually used as a catch-all designation to cover any musician who played on a Motown record.

The following list covers the musicians most frequently used on Motown recordings from 1959 through 1972; it is not an exhaustive list of every musician ever used. Some sources also include backing vocalist trio the Andantes (Jackie Hicks, Marlene Barrow, and Louvain Demps) as notable contributors to the Funk Brothers and Motown's sound.

Membership lists are based upon research by Allan Slutsky, with some minor corrections. The 13 Funk Brothers recognized as official band members by NARAS are shown in bold text.

=== Detroit musicians ===
- Keyboards:
  - **Joe Hunter** (band leader, 1959–1964)
  - **Earl Van Dyke** (band leader, 1964–1972)
  - Richard "Popcorn" Wylie (1959–1962)
  - Marvin Gaye (1961–1962)
  - Raynoma Liles "Miss Ray" Gordy (1959–1962)
  - George Fowler (1962–1969)
  - Leonard Caston Jr. (1969–1972)
  - H. B. Barnum (1963–1972)
  - **Johnny Griffith** (1963–1972)
  - James Gittens (1959–1967)
  - Ted Sheely (1967–1972)
- Guitar:
  - **Robert White** (1959–1972)
  - **Eddie "Chank" Willis** (1959–1972)
  - **Joe Messina** (1959–1972)
  - Larry Veeder (1959–1962)
  - Dave Hamilton (1959–1962)
  - Huey Davis (1959–1967, the Contours' road and studio guitarist)
  - Marvin Tarplin (1959–1972, the Miracles' road and studio guitarist)
  - Cornelius Grant (1963–1972, the Temptations' road guitarist and band leader)
  - Dennis Coffey (1966–1972)
  - Melvin "Wah Wah Watson" Ragin (1968–1972)
  - Ray Parker Jr. (1968–1972)
  - Ray Monette
  - Paul Warren
- Bass:
  - **James Jamerson** (1959–1972)
  - Clarence Isabell (1959–1962)
  - **Bob Babbitt** (1966–1972)
  - Greg Reeves (1966–1969, the Temptations' road bassist)
  - Edward Pickens (1968–1972)
  - Bill White (1969–1972, the Temptations' road bassist)
  - Tweed Beard
  - Joe Williams
  - Michael Henderson
  - Joe James
  - Antonio "Tony" Newton (the Miracles' road bassist)
- Accordion:
  - John "Johnnie Miles" Milewski (1965–1970)
- Drums:
  - **William "Benny" Benjamin** (1959–1969)
  - **Richard "Pistol" Allen** (1959–1972)
  - George McGregor (1959–1962)
  - Corey Jahns (1959–1967) bongos
  - Clifford Mack (1959–1962)
  - Marvin Gaye (1961–1962) (also listed above)
  - **Uriel Jones** (1963–1972)
  - Freddie Waits (1963–1967)
  - Melvin Brown (1967–1972, the Temptations' road drummer)
  - Andrew Smith (1968–1972)
  - Kenneth "Spider Webb" Rice (1968–1972)
  - Aaron Smith (1970–1972)
- Percussion:
  - **Jack Ashford** (1959–1972, tambourine) also vibes
  - **Eddie "Bongo" Brown** (1959–1972, various)
  - R. Dean Taylor (1960s, tambourine)
  - Bobbye Hall (1963–1972, various)
  - Stacey Edwards (1967–1972, the Temptations' road percussionist)
- Vibes:
  - Dave Hamilton (1959–1962) (also listed above)
  - James Gittens (1959–1967) (also listed above)
  - Jack Brokensha (1963–1972)
- Trumpet:
  - Herbie Williams
  - John "Little John" Wilson
  - Marcus Belgrave
  - Russell Conway
  - Johnny Trudell
  - Floyd Jones
  - Maurice Davis
  - Billy Horner
  - Gordon Stump
  - Don Slaughter
  - Eddie Jones
- Saxophone:
  - Henry "Hank" Cosby
  - Andrew "Mike" Terry
  - Norris "Kasuku Mafia" Patterson
  - Thomas "Beans" Bowles
  - Ted Buckner
  - Walter "Choker" Campbell
  - Frank Harvey Jackson
  - Ronnie Wakefield
  - "Lefty" Edwards
  - George F. Benson
  - Eli Fountain
  - Ernie Rodgers
  - Eugene "BeeBee" Moore
  - William "Wild Bill" Moore
  - Angelo Carlisi
  - Dan Turner
  - Bernie Peacock
  - Larry Nozero
  - Lanny Austin
- Trombone:
  - McKinley Jackson
  - Bob Cousar
  - George Bohanon
  - Paul Riser
  - Jimmy Wilkens
  - Don White
  - Carl Raetz
  - Patrick Lanier
  - Bill Johnson
  - Ed Gooch
- Flute:
  - Dayna Hartwick
  - Thomas "Beans" Bowles
- Piccolo:
  - Dayna Hartwick
- Strings:
  - Gordon Staples and the Detroit Symphony Orchestra string section
    - Violin
      - Zinovi Bistritzky
      - Beatriz Budinsky
      - Lillian Downs
      - Virginia Halfmann
      - Richard Margitza
      - Felix Resnick
      - Alvin Score
      - Linda Sneeden Smith
      - James Waring
    - Viola
      - Nathan Gordon
      - David Ireland
      - Eduard Kesner
      - Anne Mischakoff
      - Meyer Shapiro
    - Cello
      - Italo Babini
      - Edward Korkigian
      - Thaddeus Markiewicz
      - Marcy Schweickhardt

=== Los Angeles musicians ===
Los Angeles was an alternative recording center for Motown artists beginning in the mid-1960s, utilizing a different set of musicians. Hit tracks recorded in L.A. include the Miracles' "More Love", many of Brenda Holloway's songs, and all the early hits of the Jackson 5.

Many of the Los Angeles players were members of the Wrecking Crew, a loose-knit group of studio musicians.

- Keyboards:
  - Mike Rubini
  - Joe Sample
  - Billy Preston
  - Clarence McDonald
  - Larry Knechtel (also bass)
  - Freddie Perren (also percussion)
  - William "Smitty" Smith
  - Mike Finnigan
  - Leonard Caston Jr.
  - John Jarvis
  - Michael Lovesmith
- Guitar:
  - Ray Parker Jr.
  - Don Peake
  - Deke Richards
  - Wah Wah Watson
  - Arthur Wright
  - David T. Walker
  - Tommy Tedesco
  - Louis Shelton
  - Mike Deasy
  - Dean Parks
  - Dennis Coffey
  - Willie Hutch
- Bass:
  - Carol Kaye (also guitar)
  - Wilton Felder (also saxophone)
  - Scott Edwards
  - Jerry Knight
  - Max Bennett
  - Joe Osborn
  - Chuck Rainey
  - Alphonzo Mizell (also keyboards)
  - Ron Brown
  - Michael Mickey Durio (also drums)
- Drums:
  - Hal Blaine
  - Earl Palmer
  - Harvey Mason
  - Spider Webb
  - James Gadson
  - Ed Greene
  - Gene Pello
  - Paul Humphrey
- Percussion:
  - Bobbye Hall Porter (various)
  - King Errisson
  - Joe Clayton
  - Sandra Crouch (tambourine)
  - Jerry Steinholtz
  - Emil Richards (mallets)

=== Arrangers and conductors ===
- Detroit: Paul Riser, Willie Shorter, David Van De Pitte, Wade Marcus, Johnny Allen, Gil Askey, Ernie Wilkins, Jerry Long, Henry "Hank" Cosby, Slide Hampton, and H. B. Barnum
- Los Angeles: Gene Page, James Carmichael, Arthur Wright, Michael Lovesmith

== Selected list of hit songs on which the Funk Brothers played ==
=== (Tamla) Motown ===
- "Money" – Barrett Strong
- "Please Mr. Postman" – The Marvelettes
- "Fingertips Pt. 2" – Stevie Wonder
- "The Girl's Alright with Me" - The Temptations
- "My Guy" – Mary Wells
- "Come and Get These Memories" - Martha and the Vandellas
- "Where Did Our Love Go" – The Supremes
- "Baby I Need Your Loving" - The Four Tops
- "Baby Love" – The Supremes
- "Come See About Me" – The Supremes
- "My Girl" – The Temptations
- "Stop! In the Name of Love" – The Supremes
- "Back in My Arms Again" – The Supremes
- "I Can't Help Myself (Sugar Pie Honey Bunch)" – The Four Tops
- "I Hear a Symphony" – The Supremes
- "Love Is Like an Itching in My Heart" - The Supremes
- "You Can't Hurry Love" – The Supremes
- "Reach Out I'll Be There" – The Four Tops
- "You Keep Me Hangin' On" – The Supremes
- "Forever Came Today" – The Supremes
- "Love Child" – Diana Ross and the Supremes
- "I Heard It Through the Grapevine" – Marvin Gaye
- "I Can't Get Next to You" – The Temptations
- "Someday We'll Be Together" – Diana Ross and the Supremes
- "Ain't No Mountain High Enough" – Diana Ross
- "The Tears of a Clown" – Smokey Robinson and the Miracles
- "Just My Imagination (Running Away with Me)" – The Temptations
- "Papa Was a Rollin' Stone" – The Temptations
- "Let's Get It On" – Marvin Gaye
- "You Sure Love to Ball" - Marvin Gaye
- "Come Get to This" - Marvin Gaye
- "Just a Little Misunderstanding" – The Contours
- "Shop Around" – The Miracles
- "Shotgun" – Junior Walker & the All Stars
- "How Sweet It Is (To Be Loved by You)" – Marvin Gaye
- "The One Who Really Loves You" – Mary Wells
- "The Way You Do the Things You Do" – The Temptations
- "Ain't Nothing Like the Real Thing" – Marvin Gaye and Tammi Terrell
- "(I'm a) Road Runner" – Junior Walker & the All Stars
- "Ain't Too Proud to Beg" – The Temptations
- "I Wish It Would Rain" – The Temptations
- "The Happening" - The Supremes
- "Reflections" – Diana Ross & the Supremes
- "That's the Way Love Is" - Marvin Gaye
- "Heat Wave" – Martha & the Vandellas
- "Hitch Hike" – Marvin Gaye
- "Way Over There" – The Miracles
- "Who's Lovin' You" – The Jackson 5
- "What's So Good About Goodbye" – The Miracles
- "I Was Made to Love Her" – Stevie Wonder
- "It's the Same Old Song" – The Four Tops
- "You've Really Got a Hold on Me" – The Miracles
- "Standing in the Shadows of Love" – The Four Tops
- "If I Were Your Woman" – Gladys Knight & the Pips
- "I'm Livin' in Shame - The Supremes
- "Going to a Go-Go" – The Miracles
- "Heaven Must Have Sent You" – The Elgins
- "Dancing in the Street" – Martha & the Vandellas
- "Runaway Child, Running Wild" - The Temptations
- "Mercy Mercy Me (The Ecology)" – Marvin Gaye
- "All I Need" - The Temptations
- "Inner City Blues (Make Me Wanna Holler)" – Marvin Gaye
- "Cloud Nine" – The Temptations
- "What's Goin' On" – Marvin Gaye
- "Do You Love Me" – The Contours
- "Get Ready" – The Temptations
- "Function at the Junction" – Shorty Long
- "My World Is Empty Without You" – The Supremes
- "The Tracks of My Tears" – The Miracles
- "Can I Get a Witness" – Marvin Gaye
- "Nowhere to Run" – Martha & the Vandellas
- "Here Comes the Judge" – Shorty Long
- "Signed, Sealed, Delivered I'm Yours" – Stevie Wonder
- "Beechwood 4-5789" – The Marvelettes
- "Bernadette" – The Four Tops
- "Two Lovers" – Mary Wells
- "What Becomes of the Brokenhearted" – Jimmy Ruffin
- "My Cherie Amour" – Stevie Wonder
- "I Second That Emotion" – Smokey Robinson & the Miracles
- "(I Know) I'm Losing You" – The Temptations
- "First I Look at the Purse" – The Contours
- "Ooo Baby Baby" – The Miracles
- "25 Miles" – Edwin Starr
- "I'll Be Doggone" – Marvin Gaye
- "Pride and Joy" – Marvin Gaye
- "Ball of Confusion (That's What the World Is Today)" – The Temptations
- "It Takes Two" – Marvin Gaye & Kim Weston
- "This Old Heart of Mine (Is Weak for You)" – The Isley Brothers
- "Uptight" – Stevie Wonder
- "Devil with a Blue Dress On" – Shorty Long
- "Jimmy Mack" – Martha & the Vandellas
- "Since I Lost My Baby" – The Temptations
- "War" – Edwin Starr
- "Stubborn Kind of Fellow" – Marvin Gaye
- "Don't Mess with Bill" – The Marvelettes
- "You Beat Me to the Punch" – Mary Wells
- "Shake Me, Wake Me (When It's Over)" – The Four Tops
- "Walk Away Renée" – The Four Tops
- "Mickey's Monkey" – The Miracles
- "Ain't That Peculiar" – Marvin Gaye
- "Shoo-Be-Doo-Be-Doo-Da-Day" – Stevie Wonder

=== Other labels ===
- "Cool Jerk" – The Capitols (Atlantic)
- "Whispers (Gettin' Louder)" – Jackie Wilson (Brunswick)
- "(Your Love Keeps Lifting Me) Higher and Higher" – Jackie Wilson (Brunswick)
- "Bad Girl" – The Miracles (Chess)
- "Band of Gold" – Freda Payne (Invictus)
- "Crumbs off the Table" – Glass House (Invictus)
- "Give Me Just a Little More Time" – Chairmen of the Board (Invictus)
- "Someone's Been Sleeping in My Bed" – 100 Proof (Aged in Soul) (Hot Wax)
- "Boom Boom" – John Lee Hooker (Vee-Jay)

== See also ==
- Muscle Shoals Rhythm Section
- The Nashville A-Team
- Salsoul Orchestra
- The Section
