= Benny Benjamin =

American drummer (1925–1969)

Background information
- Also known as: Papa Zita
- Born: William Benjamin Jr. July 25, 1925; Birmingham, Alabama, U.S.
- Died: April 20, 1969 (aged 43) Detroit, Michigan, U.S.
- Genres: R&B; jazz
- Occupation: Musician
- Instrument: Drums
- Years active: 1940s–1969
- Label: Motown
- Formerly of: The Funk Brothers

William "Benny" Benjamin (July 25, 1925 – April 20, 1969), (Note: Some sources list his date of birth as July 15, 1925.) nicknamed Papa Zita, was an American musician, most notable as the primary drummer for the Motown Records studio band The Funk Brothers. He was inducted into the Rock and Roll Hall of Fame in 2003 and was named the eleventh best drummer of all time by Rolling Stone magazine in 2016.

== Life and career ==
Benjamin was a native of Birmingham, Alabama. He originally learned to play drums in the style of the big band jazz groups in the 1940s.

In 1958, he was Motown's first studio drummer, where he was noted for his dynamic style. Several Motown record producers, including Berry Gordy, refused to work on any recording sessions unless Benjamin was the drummer and James Jamerson, the bassist. The Beatles singled out Benjamin's drumming style upon meeting Gordy in the UK.

Among the Motown songs he performed on include early hits such as "Money (That's What I Want)" by Barrett Strong, "Shop Around" by The Miracles and "Do You Love Me" by The Contours; as well as later hits such as "Get Ready" and "My Girl" by The Temptations, "I Can't Help Myself (Sugar Pie Honey Bunch)" by the Four Tops, "Uptight (Everything's Alright)" by Stevie Wonder, "You Can't Hurry Love" by The Supremes, "I Heard It Through the Grapevine" by Gladys Knight & the Pips, and "Going to a Go-Go" by the Miracles. (Note: Some sources attribute "Uptight (Everything's Alright)" to drummer Richard "Pistol" Allen.)

Benjamin was influenced by the work of drummers Buddy Rich and Tito Puente. He recorded with a studio set composed of Ludwig, Slingerland, Rogers, and Gretsch components, and likely Zildjian cymbals.

By the late 1960s, Benjamin struggled with drug and alcohol addiction, and the fellow Funk Brothers Uriel Jones and Richard "Pistol" Allen increasingly recorded more of the drum tracks for the studio's releases. Benjamin died on April 20, 1969, of a stroke at age 43.
