= Eddie Willis =

American musical artist (1936–2018)

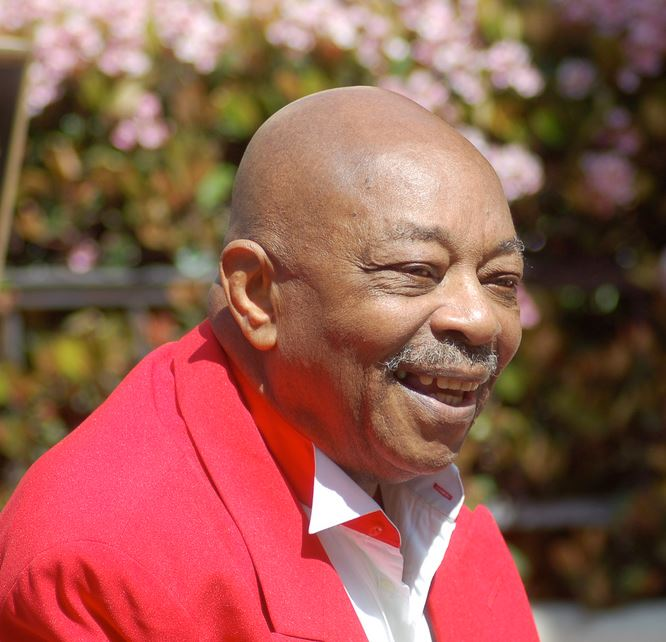
- Willis at a ceremony in March 2013 to receive a star on the Hollywood Walk of Fame for the Funk Brothers

Background information
- Also known as: Chank Willis
- Born: June 3, 1936; Grenada, Mississippi, US
- Died: August 20, 2018 (aged 82) Gore Springs, Mississippi, U.S.
- Genres: Soul; R&B
- Occupation: Musician
- Instruments: Electric guitar; electric sitar
- Label: Motown Records
- Formerly of: The Funk Brothers

Eddie "Chank" Willis (June 3, 1936 – August 20, 2018) was an American soul musician. He played electric guitar and occasionally electric sitar for Motown's in-house studio band, The Funk Brothers, during the 1960s and early 1970s.

== Early life ==
Born in Grenada, Mississippi, he listened to WDIA radio station, and was inspired by blues and country artists to teach himself how to play guitar. He suffered from polio as a child and had to use a walking stick for the remainder of his life. He moved to Detroit when he was fourteen.

== Career ==
Willis spent most of his teenage years playing with different bands around Detroit. He was soon discovered by Berry Gordy, and hired him as a Motown session musician. His first session was Marv Johnson's "Come to Me" in 1959. From 1959 to 1972, he was a part of The Funk Brothers ensemble, a group of studio musicians who played on Motown records. Among the recordings Willis performed on are "Please Mr. Postman" by the Marvelettes, "The Way You Do the Things You Do" by the Temptations, "You Keep Me Hangin' On" by the Supremes, and "I Was Made to Love Her" by Stevie Wonder. In 2010, Willis played on Phil Collins' album of Motown and 1960s soul classics, Going Back.

== Style ==
Willis was known for his signature style of muted guitar riffs which added a distinctive tone or "color" to the beat. It often was timed with the snare and on hundreds of hit songs recorded at Hitsville U.S.A. for Motown artists.

== Influences and instruments ==
Willis' influences included Chet Atkins, Wes Montgomery, and Albert King. Willis played a Gibson Firebird guitar on most of his early 1960s work and later used a Gibson ES-335. On recordings such as the Supremes' "No Matter What Sign You Are", he performed on a Coral sitar.

== Legacy ==
In 2013, The Funk Brothers received a star on the Hollywood Walk of Fame; Willis along with the other surviving Brothers attended the ceremony.

Fellow Funk Brother bandmate Dennis Coffey said of Willis: "He was the funkster, Eddie was, he was an amazing guitar player. He had that Southern thing. He’d always come up with some funky lines. We did many sessions together and he was just an all-around nice guy. I never heard him get angry at anybody about anything. He just came in and did his job."

== Personal life and death ==
In 2015, a benefit concert was held, after Willis lost owenrship of his home and guitars, and was living on disability allowance and social security.

Willis suffered lifelong problems as a result of the bout of polio he had as a child, and after his health began declining in his older years, he died on August 20, 2018, in Gore Springs, Mississippi from complications of polio at the age of 82. He was survived by his wife Rose, five children, and grandchildren.
