= List of Berklee College of Music alumni =

The following contains a list of notable alumni of Berklee College of Music. Members of this list have attended Berklee for at least one full-time semester (not including honorary degrees or summer programs) and are notable in their respective field in the music industry. Some list members may have achieved notability in the entertainment industry unrelated to music, or may be notable for achievements not related to music or entertainment.

* Designates did not complete degree/diploma program. In parentheses is year of graduation.

== Grammy-winning alumni ==
141 alums have won 332 Grammy awards.

Alum	Grad. year	Number of Grammy nominations	Number of Grammy wins
Arooj Aftab	2010	5	1
Amy Allen	2015	12	3
Cole Anderson	2019	1	1
Nick Baxter	2007	1	1
Brandon Bell	2012	5	2
Jay Bellerose	1987	2	1
Thomas Bellino	1972	4	1
Steve Berkowitz	1978	8	5
Jeff Bhasker	1999	16	5
Josh Blair	1999	2	1
Gustavo Borner	1989	6	6
Paul Boutin	1994	2	1
Stephen Bray	1978	6	1
Alan Broadbent	1969	14	2
Gary Burton	1962	22	7
Will Calhoun	1986	4	2
Kevin Camp	2007	1	1
Terri Lyne Carrington	1983	6	4
Annie Clark	2003	4	3
Vinnie Colaiuta	1975	2	1
Paula Cole	1990	7	1
Charlie Colin	1988	6	1
Carlos Colón	2004	2	1
Clay Cook	1998	4	2
Jonathan Crone	2005	1	1
Rodrigo Cuevas	2005	7	2
Billy Cumella	2015	2	1
Andrew Dawson	2001	9	3
Rick DePofi	1981	1	1
Al Di Meola	1974	1	1
Ruriá Duprat	1988	1	1
Adam Dutkiewicz	1999	3	0
Jon D'Uva	1995	3	3
Melissa Etheridge	1980	15	2
Benny Faccone	1978	6	1
Donald Fagen	1966	6	5
Chuy Flores	1997	1	1
Robert Freedman	1978	4	1
Bill Frisell	1977	6	1
Albhy Galuten	1968	7	2
Marco Gamboa	1996	1	1
Brian Garten	1995	4	1
Bleo Genovese	2004	2	1
Gil Goldstein	1970	8	5
David Greenbaum	2005	6	4
Juan Luis Guerra	1982	8	3
Andy Hall	1997	4	1
Tom Hambridge	1983	4	4
Jan Hammer	1969	2	2
Roy Hargrove	1989	6	2
Keith Harris	1999	3	1
Lalah Hathaway	1994	10	5
Levon Helm	—	4	3
Bruce Hornsby	1974	13	3
Rob Hotchkiss	1982	4	1
Byeong-Joon Hwang	1999	2	2
Bob James	1958	19	2
Joelle James	2011	2	1
Laufey Jónsdóttir	2021	2	2
Jasmine Cephas Jones	2009	1	1
Quincy Jones	1951	80	28
Pete Karam	1994	9	7
Geoffrey Keezer	1989	4	1
Diana Krall	1983	10	2
Joey Kramer	1971	14	4
Richard L. Kulsar	1990	1	1
Alex Lacamoire	1995	8	4
Tim Latham	1989	2	2
Jason Lehning	1994	3	2
Dominick Leslie	2010	2	2
Fred Lipsius	1961	7	3
Fernando Lodeiro	2007	3	3
Jeff Lorber	1971	7	1
Jeremy Loucas	2006	3	3
Joe Lovano	1972	14	1
Gavin Lurssen	1991	6	3
Natalie Maines	1995	20	12
Emerson Mancini	2008	7	2
Aimee Mann	1980	6	2
Arif Mardin	1961	18	11
Branford Marsalis	1980	18	3
Tony Maserati	1986	10	1
John Mayer	1998	19	7
Ben McKee	2009	4	1
Justin Moshkevich	2007	1	1
John Myung	1986	3	1
Jay Newland	1984	17	12
Stephen Oremus	1992	4	2
Shafik Palis	2001	1	1
Chris Pandolfi	2003	4	1
Trey Parker	2008	1	1
Danilo Pérez	1988	8	3
John Petrucci	1986	3	1
Daniel Platzman	2009	4	1
Evan Price	1996	2	2
Thomas Pridgen	2003	1	1
Claudio Ragazzi	1984	1	1
David Rawlings	1992	3	1
Patrick Robinson	1996	1	1
Wallace Roney	1981	2	1
Charlie Rosen	2012	1	1
John Ryan	2010	3	1
Bobby Sanabria	1979	5	0
Antonio Sanchez	1998	11	5
Jaclyn Sanchez	2012	2	1
Pernell Saturnino	1995	2	1
Matt Schaeffer	2012	9	4
Tom Schick	1995	1	1
John Scofield	1973	9	3
Wayne Sermon	2008	4	1
Howard Shore	1969	8	4
Alan Silvestri	1970	9	2
Charlton Singleton	1989	3	2
Ruslan Sirota	2003	1	1
Josh Sklair	1978	2	2
Allan Slutsky	1973	1	1
Luciana Souza	1988	8	1
Esperanza Spalding	2005	11	5
Matthew Stevens	2004	2	1
Erich Talaba	2003	1	2
Susan Tedeschi	1991	7	1
Mads Tolling	2003	3	2
Tommy Torres	2003	15	3
Joe Travers	1991	1	1
Molly Tuttle	2014	3	2
Diego Urcola	1990	5	1
Steve Vai	1979	12	3
Victor Vanacore	1974	1	1
Alex Venguer	2002	1	1
Brian Vibberts	1991	6	6
Eliot D. Wadopian	1980	2	2
Brian Warwick	2003	1	1
Ernie Watts	1966	4	2
Jeff Watts	1981	4	1
Daniel Weinkauf	1984	2	1
Gillian Welch	1992	7	2
Dennis White	1988	1	1
Todd Whitelock	1989	11	10
Brad Whitford	1971	14	4
Ben Wisch	1976	1	1
Anna Wise	2010	3	1
Linus Wyrsch	2008	2	1
Alon Yavnai	1995	2	1
Joe Zawinul	1959	2	1

== Oscar-winning alumni ==
Alum	Grad. year	Number of Academy Award nominations	Number of Academy Award wins
Melissa Etheridge	1980	1	1
Quincy Jones	1980	7	1
Michael Semanick	1985	11	2
Howard Shore	1969	4	3
Eugene Gearty	1982	3	1

== Notable alumni ==
=== A ===
- Mindi Abair (1991)
- Greg Abate
- John Abercrombie (1967)
- Aruna Abrams
- Arooj Aftab
- Toshiko Akiyoshi (1959)
- Cheche Alara (1994)
- Melissa Aldana (2009)
- Amy Allen (2015)
- Loren Allred
- Tony Ann, Canadian pianist and composer
- Eric André (2005)
- Ingrid Andress
- Ivory Aquino
- Ark Patrol
- Ashe, real name Ashlyn Willson (2015)
- Dave Askren
- Mulatu Astatke (1959)
- Pedro Aznar, argentinian bassist of Pat Metheny Group and Serú Girán.

=== B ===
- Victor Bailey (1979)
- Joe Barnard (2014)
- Andrew Bayer (2009)
- Kenny Beats
- Marco Benevento (1999)
- Jeff Berlin (1978)
- Jeff Bhasker (1999)
- Sanjeeta Bhattacharya
- Cindy Blackman (1980)
- John Blackwell (1995)
- Bleu
- Tangelene Bolton (2013)
- Tracy Bonham (1989)
- Jenn Bostic
- Libbi Bosworth (early 1990s)
- Sofia Boutella
- Massimo Biolcati, developer of iRealPro app.
- Joseph Brent (1999)
- Alan Broadbent (1969)
- Nili Brosh (2009), guitarist
- Gary Burton (1962)

=== C ===
- Eric Calderone
- Will Calhoun, of Living Colour (1986)
- Evan Call
- Alicia Camiña (1997)
- Arturo Cardelus (2011)
- Terri Lyne Carrington (1983)
- Vivian Cha ( Model, Songwriter, Record Producer)
- Chris Chaney, of Jane's Addiction
- Chancellor
- Cyrus Chestnut (1985)
- Toby Chu (1999)
- Chiara Civello (2000)
- Katelyn Clampett
- Alf Clausen (1966)
- Cobi
- Bruce Cockburn (1965)
- Vinnie Colaiuta (1975)
- Paula Cole (1990)
- Charlie Colin, of Train
- Vanessa Collier (2013)
- Rodrigo Cuevas (2005)

=== D ===
- Mike Daly (1996)
- Adam Deitch (1998)
- Kenwood Dennard (1973)*
- Kelly Derrickson
- Bruno Destrez (1989)
- Al Di Meola (1974)*
- Ramin Djawadi (1998)
- Teya Dora (2014)
- Adam Dutkiewicz (1999)

=== E ===
- Emily Elbert (2011)
- Empress Of
- Maria Entraigues-Abramson (1994)
- Booker Ervin*
- Melissa Etheridge (1980)*, returned to receive honorary doctorate 2006
- Kevin Eubanks (1979)

=== F ===
- Benny Faccone (1978)
- Donald Fagen (1965)*
- Rachelle Ferrell (1980)*
- Melissa Ferrick (1990)*
- Bill Frisell (1977)
- Richard Furch (1999)

=== G ===
- Albhy Galuten (1968)
- Laszlo Gardony (1985)
- Roopam Garg
- Anthony Geraci
- Melvin Gibbs
- Richard Gibbs
- Shane Gibson, of Korn
- Nikki Glaspie (2005)
- Mick Goodrick (1967)
- Catriona Gray
- Tony Grey (2001)
- Juan Luis Guerra (1982)
- Gupi (2021)

=== H ===
- Jan Hammer (1969)
- Roy Hargrove (1989)*
- Donald Harrison (1983)
- Antonio Hart (1991)
- Jules Hoffman
- Juliana Hatfield (1990)
- Lalah Hathaway (1994)
- Tom Hedden
- Amy Heidemann, of Karmin (2011)
- Jason Heinrichs, also known as Anomaly (1994)
- Alan Hewitt (1977)
- Norihiko Hibino (1997)
- Bob Holz (1977)*
- Bruce Hornsby (1974)*
- Rob Hotchkiss, of Train
- Sierra Hull (2011)
- Ian Hultquist, of Passion Pit (2008)

=== J ===
- Bob James (1958)*
- Joelle James (2011)
- Keith Jarrett (1963)*
- Wyclef Jean
- Ingrid Jensen (1989)*
- Laney Jones (2014)*
- Quincy Jones (1951)*

=== K ===
- Camara Kambon (1973)
- Geoffrey Keezer*
- Kenzie (Kim Yeon Jung), South Korean composer for SM Entertainment
- Cinya Khan of Tiny Habits
- Kiesza
- Kotringo (2003), real name Rieko Miyoshi
- Diana Krall (1983)
- Joe Kraemer (1993)
- Joey Kramer, of Aerosmith
- Wayne Krantz

=== L ===
- Abe Laboriel (1972)
- Abe Laboriel Jr. (1993)
- Alex Lacamoire (1995)
- Holly Laessig (2007) of Lucius
- Michelle Lambert (2011)
- Patty Larkin (1974)
- Henry Lau (2010)*
- Laufey (2021)
- Okkyung Lee (1998)
- Wang Leehom (1999)
- Adrianne Lenker (2012), of Big Thief
- Andres Levin
- Daniel Levitin (1979)
- Yosef Gutman Levitt
- Ken Lewis (1991)
- Josh Linkner (1988)
- Aubrey Logan (2010)
- Henning Lohner

=== M ===
- Ona Mafalda
- Natalie Maines (1995)* of The Chicks
- Eddie Manion (1970s)
- Aimee Mann (1980)* of 'Til Tuesday
- Kevin March (early 1990s), drummer of Guided by Voices, The Dambuilders, Shudder to Think
- Arif Mardin (1961)
- Charlie Mariano (1951)
- Eric Marienthal (1979)
- Maro
- Branford Marsalis (1980)
- Delfeayo Marsalis (1989)
- Tony Maserati (1986)
- Rob Mathes (1984)
- Judah Mayowa of Tiny Habits
- John Mayer (1998)*
- Steve Mazur (2000), of Our Lady Peace
- Lizzy McAlpine
- Jay McCarrol of Nirvana The Band
- Donny McCaslin (1988)
- Keith McEachern (2005), of The Wandas
- Ben McKee*, bassist of Imagine Dragons
- David McWane, lead vocalist of Big D and the Kids Table
- Filipe Melo (2000), Portuguese pianist, filmmaker and writer
- Dominic Miller, guitarist
- Harry Miree (2013), drummer
- Silvina Moreno
- Sebastian Arocha Morton (1997)
- Rob Mounsey (1975)
- George Mraz (1970)
- John Myung* of Dream Theater

=== N ===
- Reiko Nakano (2005), violinist
- Ouyang Nana, Taiwanese cellist, pianist, guitarist
- Adam Neely (2009), bass player and YouTuber
- Joey Newman (1998), Emmy-nominated composer

=== O ===
- Atli Örvarsson (1996)
- Neil Osborne of 54-40 (c. 1979)*
- Lane Shi Otayonii (2017)
- Oyinda (2013)

=== P ===
- John Paesano (2000)
- Panos Panay, president of The Recording Academy
- Trey Parker*
- Katarina Pejak*
- Heitor Pereira*
- Danilo Perez (1988)
- Mark Petrie, of PostHaste Music
- John Petrucci* of Dream Theater
- Brock Phillips
- Chico Pinheiro (1998)
- Daniel Platzman (2009), drummer of Imagine Dragons
- Mike Portnoy* of Dream Theater, The Winery Dogs, Flying Colors and formerly of Adrenaline Mob
- Taylor and Blake Powell*
- R. Prasanna (Guitar Prasanna)
- Psy (Park Jae-sang)*
- Charlie Puth (2013)

=== R ===
- Sara Rachele (2013)
- Maya Rae of Tiny Habits
- AJ Rafael (2010)
- Rahul Raj
- David Rawlings
- Niki Reiser
- Emily Remler
- Bob Reynolds (2000)
- David Robidoux
- Michaela Jaé Rodriguez (2011)
- Ed Roland, of Collective Soul
- Wallace Roney (1981)*
- Charlie Rosen
- Kurt Rosenwinkel (1990)*
- Rashawn Ross (2000)
- J. R. Rotem
- Tali Rubinstein (2014)

=== S ===
- Randy Sabien (1977), jazz violinist and music educator
- St. Vincent (Annie Clark) (2004)
- Gerard Salonga (1998)
- Bobby Sanabria (1979), drummer, percussionist, educator, and bandleader
- Antonio Sánchez
- Marina Satti (2012), Greek singer-songwriter
- Tiwa Savage (2007), Nigerian singer, songwriter and actress
- Allison Scagliotti (2015)
- Sarah Schachner
- Pieter Schlosser (2002)
- Mike Schmid (2001)
- John Scofield (1973)
- Christian Scott (2004)
- Michael Semanick (1985)
- Mei Semones (2022)
- Wayne Sermon (2008), guitarist of Imagine Dragons
- Benny Sharoni
- Sonny Sharrock (1962)
- Rasika Shekar (2017)
- Derek Sherinian (1984)
- Howard Shore (1969)
- Ryan Shore (1996)
- Alan Silvestri (1970)
- Steve Slagle (1973)
- Allan Slutsky (1978)
- Brendon Small (1997), of Dethklok
- Steve Smith (1976), drummer for the rock group Journey
- Luísa Sobral (2009)
- Soo Wincci (2019)
- Luciana Souza (1992)
- Esperanza Spalding (2005)
- Billy Squier*
- Sid Sriram (2008), singer in the South Indian film industry
- Mike Stern (1975)
- Joel Stroetzel, of Killswitch Engage
- Tierney Sutton (1987)
- Svoy (2003)

=== T ===
- Susan Tedeschi (1991)
- Chloe Temtchine, singer-songwriter
- Jacky Terrasson (1986)
- Ian Thornley, of Thornley, Big Wreck
- Gareth.T (2021)
- Pinar Toprak (2000)
- Néstor Torres (1973)
- Brian Transeau (1990)
- Justin Tranter (2001)
- Sarah Tudzin (2014), of rock band Illuminati Hotties
- Alper Tuzcu (2015)

=== U ===
- Hiromi Uehara (2003)
- Kelvin Underwood (2003), drum set and taiko musician
- Diego Urcola (1990)

=== V ===
- Steve Vai (1979)
- James Valentine, of Maroon 5
- Brian Vibberts (1991)
- Lucas Vidal (2007)
- Emil Viklický (1978)

=== W ===
- Roy Wang (2019)
- Sadao Watanabe (1965)
- Ernie Watts (1966)
- Jeff "Tain" Watts (1981)
- Aaron Weinstein (2007)
- Gillian Welch (1992)
- Kenny Werner (1968)
- Mark Whitfield (1987)
- Brad Whitford of Aerosmith (1971)
- Betty Who
- Anna Wise (2010)
- Jess Wolfe (2007)
- Natalie Wynn

=== Z ===
- Geoff Zanelli (1996)
- Marcelo Zarvos
- Joe Zawinul (1959)
- Jeremy Zuckerman
