= Taikoz =

- Taikoz logo

Background information
- Origin: Sydney, Australia
- Genres: Taiko; Percussion ensemble
- Years active: 1997-present
- Website: www.taikoz.com

Taikoz is a taiko ensemble based in Sydney, Australia. Formed in 1997, they are credited with not only being an early Australian taiko ensemble, but for also broadly expanding interest in taiko performance in Australian society.

== History ==
Taikoz, formed in 1997, was founded by Riley Lee along with Ian Cleworth, who later became artistic director. Lee had previously worked with Ondekoza in the 1970s, and was approached by Cleworth to form a kumi-daiko group in Sydney.

== Style ==
Taikoz performs predominantly original Australian compositions composed by members of the group and commissioned composers. The work is contemporary, often collaborations with other performing art mediums, and draws influence from western art music, traditional music, and sound design.

When originally formed, Taikoz performed traditional pieces passed on from groups such as Ondekoza and performers such as Eitetsu Hayashi, more modern pieces also developed by Japanese groups, as well as pieces the group has developed on their own. Some of the more traditional pieces include Yatai-bayashi and Hachijo, whereas some of their own, unique pieces include Asobibachi and Knots. Their performances also can be categorised as either more traditional, festival-based pieces (called matsuri-bayashi) before formal groups formed in the 1950s, or more based on modern kumi-daiko performance modelled on groups like Ondekoza and Kodo.

As Taikoz's development partially extended from performers in Japan, they have been credited as being very successful as emphasising Japanese elements in their work while also being able to implement original, creative styles into their performances. They have also been effective at introducing taiko performance to the Australian populace, and have generated significant interest in taiko playing among Australians.

== Performances ==
In 2007, Taikoz collaborated with the Meryl Tankard Company to create Kaidan, a dance work based on a Japanese folk legend, which premiered at the Sydney Festival.

They have also performed collaboratively with Kodo, the Sydney and Melbourne Symphony Orchestras, as well as Bell Shakespeare Company in Sydney, and the Canberra Theatre in Canberra. City Recital Hall

In 2013 they once again performed in the Sydney Festival.
