= Stanford Taiko =

American taiko group

Stanford Taiko is a collegiate taiko group based at Stanford University. One of the first collegiate taiko groups to form in North America, it was founded in the winter of 1992 by students Ann Ishimaru and Valerie Mih as a way to share taiko with the university community. As the founding organization of the Intercollegiate Taiko Invitational, Stanford Taiko has been instrumental in the development of collegiate taiko throughout the United States, as well as the larger North American taiko community through performing at the Taiko Jam of the North American Taiko Conference. Since 2000, the group has been active in the international scene through tours and exchange concerts in countries such as Japan, China, and Thailand.

Stanford Taiko is a student-run group under the guidance of the Department of Music and faculty advisors Stephen M. Sano and Linda Uyechi. Stanford Taiko continues to spread understanding of the art form among the university community and build upon its knowledge through workshops with professional groups from Japan such as Tao.

== History ==
Ann Ishimaru first saw taiko in a Seattle festival and was inspired by the energy and intensity of the art form. During her freshman year at Stanford University, she enrolled in a course offered by Susan Hayase, a former San Jose Taiko member and Stanford alum. Part of the Stanford Workshop on Political and Social Issues (SWOPSI) program, the 1990 course, called Redress Now!: The JA Internment and Taiko, was a half-history, half-practicum course that brought Ishimaru in contact with Valerie Mih. Soon afterwards, Ishimaru and Mih submitted a grant to build a taiko drum, which they used to start Stanford Taiko. The group was officially formed as a student organization in January 1992.

Stanford Taiko's first official activity was a workshop with San Jose Taiko, then led by PJ Hirabayashi and Roy Hirabayashi. The group held additional workshops with Susan Hayase and One World Taiko. During the first year, the group spent weekends drum building in Ishimaru's house, which helped the members bond. The members practiced in the ballroom of the Asian American Activities Center at Stanford.

The group debuted in the spring of 1992 at White Plaza in Stanford with their first two pieces, renshu and matsuri, and their instruments: two chuu daiko, one odaiko, a tom-tom drum, and a cowbell. In the spring of 1995, Stanford Taiko founded in the first Intercollegiate Taiko Invitational, joining groups from UCLA and UC Irvine and working with professional taiko players such as Kenny Endo. Stanford Taiko member Susan Kanagawa (Yuen) organized the logistics for the Stanford-based event. The invitational exposed Stanford Taiko to the larger collegiate taiko community and was one of the turning points in the group's history. Today, Stanford Taiko is a cultural staple of Stanford, performing at such events as New Student Orientation, its annual spring concert, and the university's annual baccalaureate service.

Stanford Taiko's mission is to create a sustainable group to share taiko culture and tradition with the Stanford community. To that end, its two guiding principles are respect for the art form and consensus-based decision-making. The group is also committed to upholding the diversity of the student body. In terms of composition, Stanford Taiko membership has grown progressively more diverse. The original group consisted of 11 members, of which eight were Japanese-American and 10 were Asian American. Today, the group has 18 members, only two of which are Japanese-American. Stanford Taiko sustains its activities in various ways. It is sponsored by the Music Department, which waives fees for concert and rehearsal spaces, and The Stanford Fund. To supplement these sources, the group performs regularly at corporate events.

=== Turning points ===
Stanford Taiko has experienced a range of transformations since its conception. The group was brought into mainstream Stanford culture with their performance at the university's 1993 baccalaureate service. Since then, Stanford Taiko has performed at every baccalaureate. The next turning point was the group's performance at FACES during the 1994 New Student Orientation. The performance attracted so much enthusiasm that the members decided to hold a full audition process to join the group, whereas previously it had accepted anyone interested in joining. A year later, Stanford Taiko founded the Intercollegiate Taiko Invitational in 1995, which exposed the group to the larger collegiate taiko community. By meeting groups from UCLA and UC Irvine, the group broke out of its relative isolation. The group held its first indoor concert in 1996 at Dinkelspiel Auditorium. The group has since incorporated staging and lighting techniques in various concerts. In 1997, the group was incorporated into Stanford's Music Department, which allows student members to earn academic credit. The group also shifted from performing borrowed pieces to a completely original repertoire in 1998. The group initiated a regular touring schedule with their 2000 visit to Japan.

== Members ==
Stanford Taiko was founded by Ann Ishimaru and Valerie Mih. The group's charter members were Julie Kikuchi, Joe Kimura, David Li, Zack Semke, Barden Shimbo, Isa Stenzel (Byrnes), Hiroshi Tanaka, Linda Uyechi, Susan Kanagawa (Yuen).

Several Stanford Taiko alumni are key contributors to North American taiko: Shoji Kameda (On Ensemble, Hiroshima), Kris Bergstrom (On Ensemble, Taiko Project), Wisa Uemura (Executive Director, San Jose Taiko), Ann Ishimaru (Portland Taiko founder), Zack Semke (Portland Taiko founder).

Other alumni who continue to play include David Wells (Taiko Project), Hiroshi Tanaka (Kenny Endo Taiko Ensemble (KETE), Jun Daiko), Emi Manuia (KETE), Rina Chang (San Jose Taiko), Dylan Solomon (San Jose Taiko), Alix Koyama (San Jose Taiko), Rylan Sekiguchi (San Jose Taiko), Susan Yuen (KETE, Jun Daiko), David Ishimaru (Jun Daiko), Linda Uyechi (San Jose Taiko, Jun Daiko), Barden Shimbo (Jun Daiko), Hari Rai Khelso (Jun Daiko), Kiyoshi Shikuma (Jun Daiko), Paul Bodnar (Taiko Mean Time), Christopher Fajardo (Jun Daiko).

== Influences ==
Various groups and experiences cultivated the eventual character of Stanford Taiko. The primary influence on Stanford Taiko was San Jose Taiko. Susan Hayase, who inspired Ishimaru and Mih, was a former San Jose Taiko member. Stanford Taiko's first official activity was a workshop with San Jose Taiko, and they held multiple additional workshops throughout the years. Former San Jose Taiko members Nancy Ozaki and Gary Tsujimoto founded One World Taiko, and both taiko players brought their perspective to Stanford Taiko workshops. As a result, Stanford Taiko shares variations of the core principles of SJT, including ki (energy), kata (form), musical technique, and attitude.

Stanford Taiko was also initially influenced by the Osuwa style of taiko. Joe Kimura, a Stanford Taiko charter member, had previously been a founding member of St. Louis Osuwa Taiko. In its early years, Stanford Taiko borrowed lessons from a myriad of groups, and Kimura contributed his perspectives in the form of the Osuwa Daiko pieces he knew, including isamigoma and hiryu sandan gaeshi.

Kodo, a prominent Japanese professional taiko group, also played a role in shaping Stanford Taiko. Stanford Taiko members watched a Kodo rehearsal in Memorial Auditorium before their scheduled performance, thus gaining an opportunity to ask questions and learn from Kodo's techniques and organization.

== Repertoire ==
Stanford Taiko's initial repertoire was largely borrowed from other groups. The first two pieces were Renshu, literally "practice" and Matsuri, both derived from musical elements of Oedo Sukeroku repertoire. These were followed by Isamigoma and Hiryu San Dan Gaeshi of Osuwa Daiko. Osuwa Daiko pieces featured prominently because of the influence of Joe Kimura, a founding member of St. Louis Osuwa Taiko. Later, Stanford Taiko added Hachijo, from Ondekoza's arrangement of the traditional folk drumming. In 1993, Hiroshi Tanaka composed the first original Stanford Taiko piece, titled Hanabi. He followed up with Tatsumaki, the second original Stanford Taiko piece. Ann Ishimaru composed the third original piece, Amaterasu. All three pieces became Stanford Taiko's signature repertoire. In the spring of 1998, Stanford Taiko made the decision to perform only original pieces in their repertoire, and has done so ever since.

== Notable performances ==
Various performances have been instrumental in shaping the direction of Stanford Taiko. Below is a list of notable concerts.

- Spring 1992: White Plaza debut

The group performed renshu and matsuri. The only instruments used were 2 chuu daiko, 1 odaiko, a tom-tom drum, and a cowbell.

- Spring 1992: Asian Pacific Student Union conference

Located in UC Santa Cruz. Stanford Taiko was a performance presence only.

- Spring 1993: 1st Spring Concert

Located at the lawn in front of Manzanita, a Stanford dorm. The concert was titled Harumono, literally "Spring Thing," although the name is not a Japanese term.

- Spring 1993: Baccalaureate

Located in Frost Amphitheater. This performance brought Stanford Taiko into mainstream Stanford culture. Stanford Taiko has played at every baccalaureate since 1993.

- Spring 1995: Intercollegiate Taiko Invitational

Stanford Taiko founded the first Intercollegiate Taiko Invitational, which brought groups from UCLA and UC Irvine together with Stanford Taiko. The invitational was organized by Susan Kanagawa (Yuen) and exposed Stanford Taiko to the larger collegiate taiko community. Since then, the Invitation has almost tripled in size and brings together over 140 students representing over 10 groups.

- Summer 2004: Thailand's National Theater

Part of Stanford Taiko's tour to Thailand.

- Summer 2005: Taiko Jam

Headline concert of the North American Taiko Conference. So far, Stanford Taiko has been the only collegiate group invited to perform at the Jam.

- Summer 2008: Great Wall of China

Part of the Stanford Music Department tour of China from June to July.

- Summer 2011: ShastaYama Taiko Festival
- Summer 2011: Opening Plenary of North American Taiko Conference
- Spring 2022: "Harmonic Convergence": the first post-pandemic performance of Stanford Taiko since 2020, celebrating the 30th year of the collegiate group, featuring Kenny Endo, master taiko artist.

== Tours ==
Stanford Taiko is an actively touring ensemble, having visited the following locations:

- Thailand: 2004, 2006, 2009, 2013, 2024
- United Kingdom: 2012
- Hawaii: 2011
- China: 2008

Ensembles from the Stanford Symphony Orchestra, Stanford Taiko, and combined choral ensembles performed a total of 10–12 concerts in Hangzhou, Xi’an, Shanghai, and Beijing as part of a cultural exchange program before the Beijing Olympics. Some of these concerts were collaborative events with the orchestras and choirs from some of China’s leading universities. The performances in Beijing were a featured part of the China International Youth Arts Festival, sponsored by China’s Ministry of Culture and the Beijing Olympic Organization.

- Seattle: 2007
- Japan: 2000, 2006, 2015

The 2000 Japan tour was Stanford Taiko's first international tour.

- Los Angeles (North America Taiko Conference): 2005
- San Jose: 2013 and 2016
