= Kelvin Underwood =

- Born: March 22, 1975 (age 51)
- Origin: Fayetteville, North Carolina
- Occupations: Musician (percussionist, vocalist)
- Years active: 1994–present
- Member of: On Ensemble
- Formerly of: Ondekoza

Kelvin Underwood (born March 22, 1975) is an American musician specializing in the drum set and taiko, the art of Japanese drumming. After joining the Japanese taiko ensemble Ondekoza at age 19, he returned to the United States four years later to pursue a career as a professional drummer. He is a member of the Los Angeles–based contemporary taiko quartet On Ensemble and collaborates with a variety of other artists and performers. Underwood resides in Ashland, Oregon with his two children.

== Early life ==
Kelvin Underwood was born in Fayetteville North Carolina on March 22, 1975, the youngest of 6 children. A few of his older siblings were musicians and visual artists in school, but he is the only one to pursue music professionally. From a young age, his family encouraged him to perform. His father was in the United States Army, and for three years during elementary school, his family lived in Munich, where he was filmed dancing to "Billie Jean" in his school's talent show at age 9. Before he became a musician, Underwood enjoyed dancing, and he cites Michael Jackson and the popularity of breakdancing as inspirations.

Underwood's first exposure to drumming came when his older brother gave him a Solid Gold toy drum set as a gift, though he was not serious about playing music at first. He later "caught the drumming bug" watching MTV and air drumming with a pair of drumsticks given to him by a family friend. When Underwood was 13, his brother recognized his interest in drumming and, along with his father, bought Underwood his first true drum set, which he still plays today. Throughout high school, Underwood was entirely self-taught, learning drumming techniques from watching videos and listening to music without any private instruction. During high school, he joined an alternative rock band, as well as participating in his school's jazz band.

== Taiko ==
=== First Taiko Experience ===
In 1990, Ondekoza was beginning their circumnavigation of the United States, starting in New York City and running counter-clockwise around the circumference of the country. While in North Carolina, the group performed for the student body at Underwood's high school. This was Underwood's first exposure to kumidaiko (ensemble taiko drumming), and after the concert, the ensemble set up one of their okedo in the lobby and invited audience members to play. Underwood had no prior experience playing taiko, but he tried out the new instrument, drawing on the rhythms he had seen in the performance and his own experiences on the drum set. The founder and director of Ondekoza, Tagayasu Den, was impressed by Underwood's playing and invited him to join the group in the International Folk Festival in downtown Fayetteville.

During the festival, Underwood was given a drum on the group's float and told to play whatever he wanted, while the rest of the group played yatai-bayashi. This was Underwood's first taiko performance, and afterward he was invited by Den to join the group and perform on stage with them. Still a high school student with dreams of studying music in college, Underwood declined, though he kept in touch with the members of Ondekoza over the next few years. He graduated high school and attended North Carolina A&T in Greensboro, NC, but after one year in the music program, he found himself dissatisfied and accepted Den's offer to move to Japan and join Ondekoza.

=== Joining Ondekoza ===
With the full support of his parents and family, Underwood met up with Ondekoza at the end of their marathon tour in New York City. He joined the group in the role of a typical trainee—helping to load the drums, set up for performances, and sell merchandise—but Den wanted Underwood to perform and very quickly had him up at the front of the stage during the group's regular performances, much sooner than was typical for a new member of the group. Underwood had no formal teacher or training, and instead learned how to play taiko in performance, primarily through observing and listening to the other players, aided by small amounts of broken English and Japanese.

Japanese culture and the new lifestyle with Ondekoza was something of a shock to 19-year-old Underwood. Far from his native land and learning as much Japanese as he could in order to get by, he had to adapt to living in a foreign country and to Ondekoza's unique communal lifestyle. In his own words, all Underwood wanted to do was play the taiko, but he had to learn discipline, and he had to grow up.

=== Frontman ===
Underwood originally joined the group looking for a sort of apprenticeship, wanting to learn what he could about the art of taiko over roughly six months and never intending to spend years in Japan. Though he was looking for a role as a student, he quickly learned all of Ondekoza's style and repertoire and soon became a featured performer. He played in nearly every piece, playing odaiko and yatai bayashi, and soloing often. He became a sort of frontman for the ensemble, appearing on posters and acting as a spokesperson when they traveled to English-speaking countries.

Ondekoza traveled widely in the four years Underwood was a member, between 1994 and '98, visiting three continents. They visited many cities along Asia's eastern coast, including Hong Kong, Shanghai, several cities in Taiwan, and a large part of Japan itself. A tour of Europe took them to Finland, Sweden, Switzerland, and Germany. In North America, they traveled primarily along the east coast and in the northeastern United States, as well as in Quebec and Ontario.

=== Leaving Ondekoza ===
Underwood never got the formal training he had been looking for when he first joined Ondekoza, and after four years with the group, he wanted to find a way to become a better percussionist, to retain his dormant skills with the drum set, and grow as an artist. He had become a masterful taiko player in the Ondekoza style, but he had not explored the art form beyond the boundaries of his ensemble. Ondekoza emphasized strength and discipline over practice and exploration. Underwood wanted to follow his own route of experimentation, while Den was more interested in preserving the stylistic integrity of Ondekoza, and so in 1998, the two parted ways.

== Back in the US ==
=== Berklee/Berkeley ===
After leaving Ondekoza, Underwood picked up his education where he left off, fulfilling his dream of attending Berklee College of Music in Boston, MA. At Berklee, he found the sort of formal education and environment of exploration that he had found lacking during his time in Japan. He focused on the drum set in college, not playing any taiko during his time at Berklee from 1999 to 2003. At that point in his life, he considered himself "done with taiko" and had no interest in North American taiko, which he saw as driven by a Japanese-American identity he did not relate to.

While living in Boston, Underwood met his future wife, Rosie Dunaway. After graduation, he had no desire to stay in Boston or move back to North Carolina, so at his wife's suggestion the pair moved to the San Francisco Bay Area. They settled in Berkeley, California, where Underwood found work playing in a variety of jazz, alternative rock, and jam bands. Although he enjoyed the music, Underwood felt that it was not working out for him as a musician. He found that the other musicians he played with lacked the extreme focus he had found in the members of Ondekoza, and the "basic taiko spirit" that he feels taiko players everywhere share.

=== On Ensemble ===
In early 2004, Underwood saw a performance by the Los Angeles-based taiko quartet on Ensemble and was struck by the group's innovation and originality. He noted the "masterful" emphasis on movement as the ensemble incorporated elements of traditional Japanese dance into their performances, as well as the focus on melody achieved using instrumentation that was uncommon to the other taiko groups he had seen: Koto, Tuvan throat singing, and a variety of percussion instruments not usually found in taiko music. It occurred to Underwood that, although he had felt disconnected from the cultural roots of North American taiko, he could still play taiko while exploring his own musical interests, developing himself as a musician while also taking the art of taiko places it had not been before.

At the time of that performance, Underwood had no plans to become involved with on Ensemble, but he later met ensemble members Shoji Kameda and Kris Bergstrom and was surprised to discover that they knew of him from his time in Ondekoza and were interested in working with him. Over the next year, while still living in the Bay Area, he began traveling to LA periodically to collaborate and perform with the group. In the beginning, he played only drumset, but after Michelle Fujii decided to leave on Ensemble to become Artistic Director of Portland Taiko, Underwood expressed to the group an interest in playing more taiko. He was gradually incorporated into more songs, branching out to play more instruments, and as songs grew up around his abilities he became a main member of the ensemble.

=== Ashland ===
For a period of time, Underwood and his former wife considered moving to Los Angeles to live closer to on Ensmble, but after the birth of their son, Blaise, they decided to move to Rosie's hometown in Ashland, Oregon. In Ashland, Underwood got involved with the Oregon Shakespeare Festival, and has performed as a drummer during their 2009, 2010 and 2012 seasons, while also collaborating with a variety of artists, including Ashland's Dancing People Company, Rock music artist Frankie Hernandez, the Mackay Project Jazz Quartet, and the Southern Oregon University Percussion Ensemble. He finds it challenging to remain involved with on Ensemble over such a distance, but he travels a lot between Ashland and Los Angeles for rehearsals and joins the group for tours throughout the US. In addition to these collaborations, Kelvin spends time developing his own musical project "Meidoko" using taiko and other instruments and influences he has encountered over the years.

== Works ==
=== Discography ===
“Songs For A Thug In Winter” by Space Challenger (2021) “Fool’s Gold” (Single) by Space Challenger (2021)

=== Video ===
- Fujiyama, Ondekoza, 1997.
- NEIRO, On Ensemble, 2006.
- Live at the Cerritos Center, On Ensemble, 2007.
