= Stephen M. Sano =

- Born: 1959 (age 66–67); California
- Occupations: Musician, conductor
- Instruments: Piano, guitar
- Website: stanford.edu/~sano/

Stephen M. Sano (born 1959) is Professor of Music, the Harold C. Schmidt Director of Choral Studies, and the Rachford & Carlota A. Harris University Fellow in Undergraduate Education at Stanford University. Using the name Steve Sano, he is also an accomplished kī hō'alu, or slack-key guitar, player.

== Background ==
Sano is a native of Palo Alto, California. His father, Iwao Peter Sano, was a second generation Japanese American who, as a second son, was adopted by relatives in Japan, and repatriated to the United States after serving in the Japanese Army and working for the U.S. Occupation. The elder Sano described his experiences as a member of the Japanese Army and Russian prisoner of war in his book One Thousand Days in Siberia. Sano's mother, Minako Sano, is a graduate of Tsuda College. She immigrated from Tokyo to California in the 1950s.

Sano graduated from San Jose State University with a B.A. in Piano Performance and Theory from the studio of Aiko Onishi and worked as executive director of the Peninsula Symphony before attending Stanford where he earned his M.A. and D.M.A. in Choral and Orchestral Conducting under the guidance of William Ramsey.

== Stanford ==
At Stanford University, Sano directs the Stanford Chamber Chorale and Stanford Symphonic Chorus, teaches conducting, and offers seminars in kī hō'alu and North American taiko. From 2006 to 2016, he served as the Chair of the Department of Music. Sano's excellence in teaching and university service has been recognized by several awards.

The Stanford Chamber Chorale is the university's select group of 24 undergraduate and graduate student singers which, under Sano's direction, records, tours annually, has collaborated with artists such as England's Tallis Scholars; the Choir of St John's College, Cambridge; the Choir of Trinity College, Cambridge; Gondwana Chorale, part of Australia's Gondwana Choirs; Chatham Baroque; Paco Peña; and the Kronos Quartet, recorded a collection of works by Kirke Mechem, at the composer's request, and premiered works by Melissa Hui, Takeo Kudo, Jonathan Berger, Giancarlo Aquilanti, Christopher Tin, and Howard Helvey.

The Stanford Symphonic Chorus is the university's largest choir and includes students, faculty, staff and community members. In 2008, Stanford orchestra director, Jindong Cai, and Sano led the combined Stanford choirs, orchestra, Stanford Taiko, pianist Jon Nakamatsu and the St. Lawrence String Quartet to China on a goodwill tour prior to the Beijing Summer Olympics.

== Kī hō'alu ==
Sano is a student of kī hō'alu, or Hawaiian slack-key guitar, and has recorded two solo albums on the Daniel Ho Creations label and two collections of duets with his teacher and mentor, Ozzie Kotani. Sano teaches a seminar about the art form, lectures on the topic and actively supports the presentation of Hawaiian music at Stanford.

== Innovation ==
In 2013, Sano embarked on a project to combine his love of stringed instruments with the construction of the Bing Concert Hall, a key performance venue for the music ensembles that he conducts and advises. Sano commissioned four instruments to be built from Alaskan yellow cedar scraps that were salvaged from the construction of the Bing Hall Stage. Twin tenor 'ukuleles were built by Rick Turner (luthier) and a guilele was built by luthier Pepe Romero Jr. , son of renowned guitarist Pepe Romero. A kasha-style guitar by Jay Hargreaves is still in process.

== Awards ==
- 2014 Bass University Fellow
- 2004 Dean's Award for Distinguished Teaching at Stanford
- 2001 Asian American Faculty Award.

== Recordings ==
=== Stanford Chamber Chorale ===
- Haydn: Nelsonmesse. With the St. Lawrence String Quartet. Daniel Ho Creations, 2015.
- Illumine: Christmas at Stanford. Daniel Ho Creations, 2012.
- A Celebration of Life. Arsis Audio, 2009.
- Kirke Mechem: 7 Joys of Christmas and Beyond. Arsis Audio, 2005.
- Choral Reflections. Pictoria Records, 2002.
- Voices of Christmas. Pictoria Records, 1999.
- My Spirit Sang All Day: A Portrait in Song. Stanford University Records, 1998.

=== Kiho'alu ===
- Songs from the Taro Patch: Na Mele Mai Na Lo’i Kalo. Daniel Ho Creations, 2007.
- With Ozzie Kotani. Omoide: Remembrance. Daniel Ho Creations, 2003. (Hawaii Music Awards finalist)
- With Ozzie Kotani. A Taro Patch Christmas. Daniel Ho Creations, 2001. (Nā Hōkū Hanohano Awards finalist)
- Pu’ukani. Daniel Ho Creations, 2000.
