= Askren =

Askren is an English surname. Notable people with the surname include:

- Ben Askren (born 1984), American sport wrestler and mixed martial artist
- Dave Askren, American jazz guitarist and educator
