= Sylvie Genty =

French actress and writer (1951–2022)

- Born: Sylvie Jeanne Denise Lucienne Marie-Françoise Genty; 12 November 1951; Paris, France
- Died: 16 December 2022 (aged 71); 18th arrondissement of Paris, France
- Education: Conservatory of Nice; Conservatoire national supérieur d'art dramatique
- Occupations: Actress; Writer

Sylvie Genty (12 November 1951 – 16 December 2022) was a French actress and writer. She was active in dubbing and was known as the French voice of Sigourney Weaver. In 1996, she published the book La Palatine ou Les jours de rien.

== Biography ==
Genty studied acting at the Conservatory of Nice from 1968 to 1970 and earned a role at the Centre dramatique de Nice-Côte d'Azur in a performance of Voltaire's Candide. She then studied at the Conservatoire national supérieur d'art dramatique from 1972 to 1976.

On television, Genty was best known for her role as Maître Bataille in Tribunal alongside her husband, Bernard Larmande.

Sylvie Genty died in the 18th arrondissement of Paris on 15 or 16 December 2022, at the age of 67.

== Filmography ==
=== Cinema ===
- Betty (1992)
- L'Aube insolite (2002)

=== Television ===
- La Vie des autres (1981)
- Tribunal (1990–1993)
- Cas de divorce (1991)
- C'est quoi, ce petit boulot ? (1991)
- Alice Nevers (2000)
- Vent de poussières (2001)
- Avocats et Associés (2001)
- Boulevard du Palais (2002)
- Quai n° 1 (2004)
- Navarro (2004–2006)
- Julie Lescaut (2005)
- Les Châtaigniers du désert (2010)
- Profilage (2012)
- Détectives (2014)
- Vise le cœur (2022)
