= David Kadouch =

French classical pianist

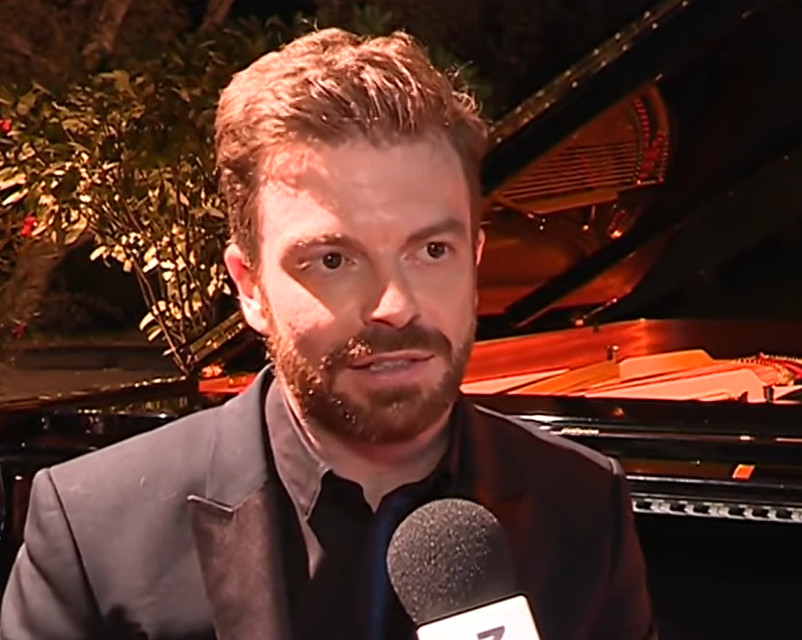
- Kadouch in 2008
- Born: 7 December 1985 (age 40); Nice, France
- Education: Conservatoire de Nice; Conservatoire de Paris; Reina Sofía School of Music
- Occupation: Classical pianist
- Awards: Leeds International Piano Competition; International Classical Music Awards

David Kadouch (born 7 December 1985) is a French pianist and chamber musician. His international career began early when, at age 13, he was in concert with Itzhak Perlman in New York. A finalist in several competitions, he was named Young Artist of the Year at the International Classical Music Awards (ICMA) in 2011. He has performed and recorded with a focus on chamber music and contemporary music.

== Early life and education ==
Born in Nice, Kadouch began his piano training at the Conservatoire de Nice and continued studies at the age of 14 with Jacques Rouvier at the Conservatoire de Paris. He then moved to the Reina Sofía School of Music in Madrid, where he studied piano with Dmitri Bashkirov and chamber music with Márta Gulyás and Ralf Gothóni. He has also attended master classes with Daniel Barenboim, Murray Perahia, Maria João Pires, Maurizio Pollini, Stephen Kovacevich and Eliso Virsaladze.

== Career ==
At the age of 13, Kadouch won the Young Talents Competition in Milan and was subsequently invited by Itzhak Perlman to give a joint concert in New York. In 2005 he came third at the Telekom Beethoven Competition, as well as at the Kissinger Klavierolymp in 2007. He came fourth at the Leeds International Piano Competition in 2009. Kadouch was Young Artist of the Year at the Victoires de la musique classique in 2010. That year, he played a solo recital at Metropolitan Hall in New York City. He was named Young Artist of the Year at the International Classical Music Awards (ICMA) in 2011.

His repertoire includes not only the usual classical and romantic piano works from Bach to Beethoven and Mendelssohn to Saint-Saëns, but also less frequently performed music, for example Arvo Pärt's Lamentate, Guillaume Connesson's 2009 piano concerto The Shining One, and Sergei Taneyev's Prelude and Fuge, Op. 29.

Kadouch has played at international music festivals such as the Klavier-Festival Ruhr, the Jerusalem Festival, Sommets Musicaux de Gstaad, Verbier Festival, Colmar Festival, Festival de La Roque-d'Anthéron and at La Folle Journée Nantes. He has worked with conductors Gábor Takács-Nagy, Jean-Claude Casadesus, Charles Dutoit and Chung Myung-whun. His chamber music partners include for example the Quatuor Ébène, the Modigliani Quartet, Edgar Moreau, Renaud Capuçon and Gautier Capuçon.

== Discography ==
Kadouch's recordings include:

- Revolution. Piano music related to the French Revolution (2019)
- En Plein Air. Bach: Capriccio in B-flat major, BWV 992; Schumann: Waldszenen, Op. 82; Janáček: In the Mists; Bartók: Out of Doors (2016, Mirare)
- Mussorgsky: Pictures at an Exhibition; Nikolai Medtner: Sonata reminiscenza in A-minor, Op. 38/1; Sergei Taneyev: Prelude and Fugue in G-sharp minor, Op. 29 (2012, Mirare)
- Grieg's violin sonatas, with Alexandra Soumm (2010, Claves)
- Schumann: Piano Sonata No. 3 in F minor, op. 14, Piano Quintet in E-flat major, Op. 44, with Quatuor Ardeo (2011, Transart Live)
- Stephen Kovacevich at the Verbier Festival Academy (2011; The Masterclass Media Foundation), DVD
- Shostakovitch: 24 Preludes, Op. 34, Piano Quintet in G minor, Op. 57, with Quatuor Ardeo (2010; Transart Live)
- Edition Klavier-Festival Ruhr – Beethoven, Liszt, Prokofiev (2008; Initiativkreis Ruhrgebiet), live recording
- Beethoven: Piano Concerto No. 5 (2007, Naxos), live recording at the Kölner Philharmonie
- Barenboim on Beethoven Masterclasses (2007, EMI Classics), DVD
