= Cobi (musician) =

American musician from Minnesota

- Also known as: Cobi Mike
- Born: Jacob Michael Schmidt; Grand Marais, Minnesota, United States
- Occupation: Musician
- Years active: 2008–present
- Labels: Manitou River Records (2020–present); 300 Entertainment (2016–2020)
- Formerly of: Gentlemen Hall
- Website: cobimusic.net

Cobi is an American musician from Grand Marais, Minnesota. A former original member of the Boston-based band Gentlemen Hall, Cobi released his solo single "Don't You Cry For Me" on May 3, 2016, under 300 Entertainment.

== Early life and career ==
Cobi became interested in music at about age eight. When a family friend visited their home with an electric guitar, then he began to teach Cobi and his brother a few chords. Once he was able to play them, his interest in music grew. That summer, he bought his first guitar, a Squier Stratocaster, by saving up money made from mowing lawns for $3 an hour. From then on, he taught himself to play guitar by ear, listening to songs over and over until he mastered them. Shortly after, Cobi and a long time friend formed a blues band, playing covers of songs at local bars in Minnesota and Wisconsin. Cobi is an alumnus of Berklee College of Music in Boston.

In 2008, Cobi and five others formed the band Gentlemen Hall. The success of the band, which was signed to Island Def Jam Records, came rather quickly. In 2009, Gentlemen Hall won a MTV Video Music Award for Best Breakout Boston Artist, and the band performed at the 2011 Billboard Music Awards. In 2012, Cobi sang The Star-Spangled Banner at a New England Patriots game.

=== 2015–present ===
On December 18, 2015, Cobi signed with 300 Entertainment. In April 2016, he joined English progressive trance group Above & Beyond's international tour, providing vocals for many of the songs. The tour included dates running through June 2016 at iconic venues such as Royal Albert Hall, The Hollywood Bowl, and the Sydney Opera House.

On May 3, 2016, Cobi released "Don't You Cry For Me", which premiered through Interview Magazine. The track was later released through digital retailers and streaming services Spotify, Google Play, iTunes, Apple Music, and Amazon Music on May 6, 2016. In July 2016, the track was trending on Billboard's and Spotify's Viral 50 list. A music video for the song was released in September 2016 and premiered through the Huffington Post. As of October 2016, the song had over 12 million streams on Spotify since its debut in May. On September 29, 2016, Billboard premiered his second single "Prophet Story". Billboard also premiered the music video for "Prophet Story" on January 17, 2017.

On January 23, 2017, Cobi performed "Don't You Cry For Me" on The Tonight Show Starring Jimmy Fallon with members of The Roots, with the New Power Generation's Morris Hayes on keyboards. He released the EP Songs From the Ashes, Pt. 1 on September 15, 2017. In November 2019, he released the single "Island In My Mind". In January 2020, he released the single "No Way Out". In March, he released the song "Keep Climbing". In May, he released the song "Don't Stop".

== Artistry and influences ==
Cobi's blues-like sound has been compared to that of Hozier. His single "Don't You Cry For Me" features a gospel choir providing background vocals, giving the song a soulful sound. Cobi grew up listening to, and found musical inspiration in, Jimi Hendrix and Jimmy Page.

== Discography ==
=== Extended plays ===
Title	Extended play details
Songs From the Ashes, Pt. 1	Released: September 15, 2017; Label: 300 Entertainment; Format: Digital download
Songs From the Ashes, Pt. 2	Released: September 21, 2018; Label: 300 Entertainment; Format: Digital download
