= Sai-So: The Remix Project =

sai-so 再創

Remix album by Kodo
- Released: February 20, 1999
- Genre: World
- Language: Japanese
- Label: Tristar

Kodo chronology
いぶき (1996)	sai-so 再創 (1999)	Ibuki Remix (1999)

Professional ratings
Review scores
Source	Rating
Allmusic	link

Sai-So: The Remix Project is the first remix album by Japan-based Kodo.

== Track listing ==
1. Strobe's nanafushi (Satori Mix) - 5:45
2. Ibuki Reconstruction・DJ Krush - 3:31
3. Wax Off・David Beal, David Baron & Lindsay Jehan - 4:03
4. Kevin Yost's Deep & Ethnic Mix - 7:29
5. Wax On・Kasz & David Beal - 3:54
6. Inteligente's Nobi (Kashikoi Taiko To Basu Mix) - 7:02
7. Strobe's The Hunted (Kannagara Mix) - 3:41
8. Bill Laswell's Nanafushi - 9:07
9. Bill Laswell's The Hunted - 6:22
10. Strobe's Satori Beats - 3:08
11. Strobe's Samurai Dub
