= Kodo Together =

Studio album by Kodō
- Released: July 9, 2021

Kodo Together is an album by Japanese drumming group Kodō, released on July 9, 2021. Guests artists include Andrea Belfi, Kevin Saunderson, Skream, and Rufus Wainwright.
