= Roopam Garg =

American musician

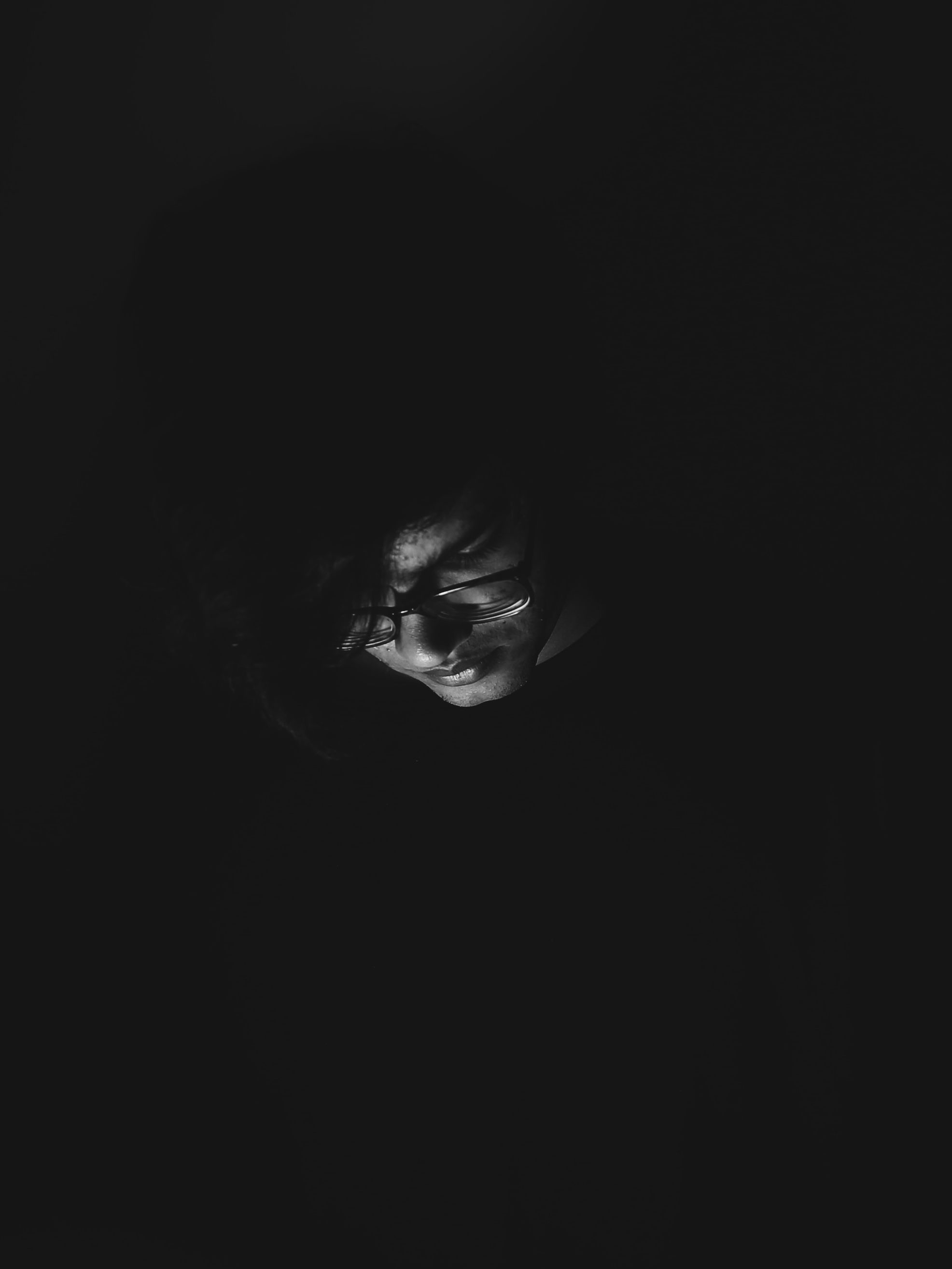

Background information
- Also known as: The Surrealist
- Born: October 17, 1995 (age 29); Singapore
- Genres: ambient, experimental, electronic
- Occupation(s): musician, guitarist, composer
- Instrument: Guitar
- Years active: 2016–present

Roopam Garg (born October 17, 1995) is an American musician, guitarist and composer. He is known for his idiosyncratic work with the guitar and in ambient music, and has recorded and released several singles. Guitar World has described his work as "some of the most compelling orchestral guitar music around today".

== Career ==
In 2015, Garg enrolled at Berklee College of Music in Boston, Massachusetts. It was in Berklee where he began his project The Surrealist, initially as an experimental metal project. He released his debut single Self Spiral leading up to an EP titled "Naked Awareness", followed by three singles in 2017 "Origami", "Lux", and "Echo End". He graduated from Berklee in 2018, with a Bachelor of Music degree. Garg also received the 2018 Berklee Performance-Division Guitar Scholarship Award.

In 2018, shortly after graduating, Garg performed at the UK Tech- Fest 2018 and Dissonance Festival 2018. Later that year, he endorsed Kiesel Guitars as well as Stone Age Guitar Products.

The year 2019 represented a change in direction for Garg. He left Kiesel Carvin Guitars and formed an endorsement with Abasi Concepts, a guitar company initiated by Tosin Abasi of Animals As Leaders, and shortly after, endorsed Fishman Pickups as well. He also shifted his focus from progressive metal-based works, feeling progressive metal to be a "sterile environment" that "seeks perfection", to releasing darker, more ambient-based works, feeling it was "more liberating as a composer", describing ambient music to be a "blank canvas where anything goes".

== Influences ==
Garg credits film scores such as those of Angelo Milli, Ben Salisbury and Geoff Barrow, as a significant influence on his work, stating how "good film scores are able to bring out anxiety, hope or depression within the characters, without which the film would be devoid of human connection".

His favored bands and musicians include Animals As Leaders, Meshuggah, Taylor Deupree, Nils Frahm, Jon Hopkins, CUTS, and Mark Pritchard.

== Discography ==
=== The Surrealist ===
==== EPs ====
- Naked Awareness (2016)

==== Singles ====
- "Self Spiral" (2016)
- "Origami" (2017)
- "Lux" (2017)
- "Echo End" (2017)
- "Mira" (2018)
- "Walking Stick Enigma" (2019)
- "Terminal" (2019)
- "Kaleido" (2019)
- "Arcadia" (2019)
- "A Repeated Flow From Beauty To Higher Beauty" (2019)
- "origami" (2020)
- "The Flowering of Human Consciousness" (2022)
- "Hurricane" (2023)
- "Cells" (2023)
- "Escape" (2024)
- "Ex Machina" (2024)
- "Perfect Organism" (2024)

== See also ==
- List of ambient music artists
- List of Berklee College of Music alumni
