= Den Tagayasu =

Japanese musician

- Born: December 7, 1931; Tokyo, Japan
- Died: April 11, 2001 (aged 69) Japan
- Occupation: Taiko performer
- Instrument: Taiko
- Formerly of: Ondekoza

Den Tagayasu (田耕, Den Tagayasu) (1931–2001) was a taiko performer and founder of the group Ondekoza.

== Biography ==
Den was born in Asakusa district of Tokyo in 1931. Den's birth name was Kozo Tajiri (田尻耕三, Tajiri Kōzō). His hometown was subjected to American airbomb raids in 1945, though he and his family were able to move south to his mother's home in Kagoshima before they were attacked. At the conclusion of World War II, Den returned to Tokyo and began high school, which he completed in 1952. While in high school, Den organized a strike that resulted in the removal of the school principal. Den suspected this organizing experience was one factor that allowed him to enroll into Waseda University that was governed by a leftist student organization. While Den studied Chinese literature there, he also had considerable involvement in several violent demonstrations in 1952. Consequently, Den was dismissed from Waseda.

Den fled from Tokyo to escape possible arrest for his activities and worked as a laborer in a Kobe port. He had also traveled to Germany after working for about six months, but Den was reportedly unimpressed and subjected to racial harassment. He studied under Professor Miyamoto Tsuneichi and was influenced greatly by him in creating Ondekoza. He also joined a group called Warabiza, that would perform Russian folk music and later Japanese folk dance and music.

In 1958, Den went to Sado Island for the first time. Sado island was losing its population and some people on Sado wanted to bring youth back to the island and create a group. Ei Rokusuke with his Radio program announced a new project on the radio and tried to rally some young people to go to Sado island. the birth of Ondekoza started in 1968. He left the island after six months, but returned to the island in 1968 with his family with the intention of living there.The group took a few years to develop into a Taiko group that took the world by surprise. Den was familiar through his travels and study with Prof Miyamoto about Japanese taiko festivals. Den was nota musician himself, he was a catalyst in bringing youth together and creating a musical group. He found sponsors and finances to support the group Ondekoza with the help of companies such as Suntory. Den became familiar with a local style of taiko performance on the island called ondeko during his stay, the group was named Ondekoza derived from the local dialect of On De-ku(Oto daiku) = carpenters of sound. They were given an abandoned school house to live in. some of the locals were a little puzzled in seeing young people run every day and only playing Taiko. in the first few months, the youth that had gathered on Sado tended to party too much and Mr Den decided to set some strict rules for Ondekoza. they were not to watch TV or read the media, no alcohol or smoking was allowed and long runs 10–20 km a day became part of the training along with Taiko, dance, flute training sessions. Tagayasu Den led Ondekoza until is death in 2001. In the early 80's members of Ondekoza along with outsiders separated and created a group by the name of Kodo and some. became independent Taiko players such as Eitetsu Hayashi.

Mr Den kept the name and restarted with the same principles with new members. Ondekoza moved first to Nagano, before moving to Nagasaki's Unzen for 7 years. Den found a sponsor for the group fora few years and the groups was named Nagasaki Ondekoza fora few tours in Europe. The group went on to tour the world and run many marathons ( Boston, NY, Los Angeles). In 1989, Ondekoza performed in Ondekoza Yume Bayashi, a revue at a hotel ( New Fujiya Hotel) in Atami for one year. the group performed over 700 shows during that period. Tagayasu Den was a story teller, inspired by many books and stories. His concept of Taiko performance was unique. He wanted audiences to see the sound a concept he borrowed from the god/goddess Kannon sama. The character for the Kannon (観音) literally is see sound. He wanted to create a more visual and visceral performing art form with Ondekoza 's Taiko drumming. Thus creating unique pieces such as Yatai Bayashi and Odaiko. Mr Den organized a USA marathon of the perimeter from 1990 to 1993 that was mostly organized by lead members of Ondekoza Marco Lienhard and Shigeru Yamamoto and helped the completion of the tour.

Mr Den would only check on Ondekoza members sporadically from 1991 to 1993. Den took the group back to Japan and joined Japan Arts roster fora couple of years. Marco Lienhard from 1990 to 1998 set the world tours for the group with the help of some agencies in Canada and Europe such as Atmo. Den's mother was Fujiko Tajiri and Den towards the end of his life was attracted by Mt Fuji (representing in a way the mother) and set their base in Shizuoka. He wanted to set the home for Ondekoza in Izu Peninsula with a view of Mt Fuji. Eventually moving to Fuji City view a view of the Mount Fuji.

Den died in 2001. His last words, according to a performer in Ondekoza, translated to, "We’re going to go with Ondekoza of Mount Fuji," referring to the decision to move the group from Sado Island to the city of Fuji in Shizuoka prefecture, and rename it accordingly.

== Ondekoza ==
Shortly after Den permanently resided on Sado Island, Den held a summer class on music in 1970; Den was interested in revitalizing Sado Island and create eventually a folk art university. Things eventually changed to gear towards Taiko performance and in Japanese folk music in general. In 1971, Den officially founded Ondekoza, and some of the approximately 40 students who attended the summer class became some of the core members of Ondekoza. Performers in Ondekoza lived on Sado Island in a communal setting, and Den had them undergo a rigorous training regiment including a 10-kilometer run every morning at 4:00 AM.
