= Shoji Kameda =

- Born: 1976 (age 48–49); California
- Occupations: Musician, composer
- Instruments: Taiko, Tuvan throat singing
- Years active: 2003–

Shoji Kameda is a fourth-generation Japanese American musician and composer, and leading player of North American taiko. He is a founder and member of On Ensemble, a contemporary taiko quartet, and a former member of the jazz fusion group Hiroshima.

== Personal life ==
Kameda was born on May 1, 1976, in San Jose, California. He grew up in Mt. Shasta, California and attended Mt. Shasta High School. He graduated from Stanford University in 1999 with a B.A. in History and currently resides in Los Angeles with his wife, Emi Yoshimura.

== Taiko ==
Kameda started playing taiko when he was 8 years-old. His first teachers were Russell Baba and Jeanne Mercer, former students of Seiichi Tanaka and members of San Francisco Taiko Dojo. Kameda and friend, Masato Baba, were two of the original members of Shasta Taiko, one of North America's earliest children's taiko groups. Both Kameda and Baba were featured in the video documentary, "Shasta Taiko", winner of the 16th annual National Cable ACE Award in cultural affairs.

Soon after enrolling at Stanford in the fall of 1994, Kameda joined Stanford Taiko where he was a member from 1994 to 1996 and 1997 to 1999, taking a gap year during the 1996/1997 academic year to study with Kenny Endo in Honolulu, Hawai'i and perform with the Kenny Endo Taiko Ensemble. Once back at Stanford, he served as artistic director and composer for Stanford Taiko. In 1998, Kameda was a driving force behind the group's ability to present their first concert of all original compositions.

Following his graduation from Stanford, Kameda played briefly with San Jose Taiko, then moved to Japan in 2000 for two years to study traditional Japanese music. While there he studied hogaku hayashi with Saburo Mochitsuki, edo bayashi with Kyosuke Suzuki, and played kumidaiko with Nihon Taiko Dojo.

While in Japan, Kameda, Masato Baba, and Kris Bergstrom performed in Hakodate in August 2001, planting the seed that was to become "on Ensemble", the group currently composed of Kameda, Baba, Bergstrom, and Kelvin Underwood. In 2005, Kameda produced the ensemble's first CD, Dust and Sand which was met with critical acclaim. In 2009, he produced Ume in the Middle, a recording noted for its "boundless imagination" with "truly interesting and innovative" tracks .

Since 2004 Kameda has toured and recorded with the jazz fusion group Hiroshima. Their latest release, Legacy, was nominated for a 2009 Grammy Award.

Kameda has been active in a number of other projects as well. In 2008, Kameda appeared with Stevie Wonder at the 2008 Democratic National Convention. In 2009, he worked with Khoomei Taiko Ensemble, appearing at the Kennedy Center and at the Earshot Jazz Festival in Seattle

== Studio Work ==
Kameda's studio credits include Heroes Original Television Score, produced by Wendy Melvoin and Lisa Coleman and Calling All Dawns, produced by Christopher Tin.

== Film Work ==
Kameda composed and performed the score for Abduction: The Megumi Yokota Story . In 2010, he partnered with Sam Hale on the film Yamasong, produced by Heather Henson and shown at the Florida Film Festival; the film garnered awards for Best Fantasy Short Film and Best Animated Film at the 2010 Dragon*Con Independent Film Festival.

== Awards and honors ==
In 2006 Kameda was selected to participate in the Asia Pacific Performance Exchange (APPEX) at UCLA's Center for Intercultural Performance and appeared in "one of the most perfectly realized group pieces". In 2009 Kameda was again recognized by the Center for Intercultural Performance and chosen to be a U.S. Fellow to Indonesia

== Works ==
- God of Love, Stereo Alchemy, 2012
- Yamasong, Sam Hale. 2010.
- Ume in the Middle, On Ensemble. Turtlefield Music, 2009.
- Calling All Dawns, Christopher Tin, 2009.
- Legacy, Hiroshima. Heads Up, 2009.
- Heroes Original Television Score. La-La Land Records, 2009.
- Little Tokyo, Hiroshima. Heads Up, 2007.
- Abduction: The Megumi Yokota Story. Safari Media, 2006.
- Dust and Sand, On Ensemble, 2005.
- Obon, Hiroshima. Heads Up, 2005.
