= Ibuki (Kodō album) =

いぶき

Studio album by Kodō
- Released: December 1, 1996 (JP); January 28, 1997 (US)
- Recorded: July 17, 1996–July 22, 1996
- Genre: World
- Length: 50:32
- Language: Japanese
- Label: Tristar - Sony
- Producer: Bill Laswell

Kodō chronology
Kodo Live at the Acropolis (1995)	いぶき (1996)	sai-so 再創 (1999)

Professional ratings
Review scores
Source	Rating
Allmusic	4.5/5 stars

Ibuki (いぶき) is the seventh original album by the Japanese taiko group Kodō (鼓童).

== Track listing ==
No.	Title	Music	Length
1.	"七節" (NANAFUSHI)	Tetsuro Naito	5:13
2.	"野火" (NOBI)	Ryutaro Kaneko	5:03
3.	"アカバナー" (AKABANAH)	Ryutaro Kaneko	5:07
4.	"族 -はちろくの巻-" (ZOKU -Hachiroku no Maki-)	Leonard Eto	7:50
5.	"A-SON-JA-O"	Yasukazu Kano	4:38
6.	"THE HUNTED"	Motofumi Yamaguchi	6:52
7.	"鬨の声" (TOKI NO KOE)	Eichi Saito	2:39
8.	"いぶき" (IBUKI)	Motofumi Yamaguchi	5:08
9.	"族 ～Wave～" (ZOKU ~Wave~)	Leonard Eto	4:07
10.	"JANG-GWARA"	Ryutaro Kaneko	3:55
