= Reiko Nakano =

Japanese violinist

- Born: 1983 (age 42–43); Tokyo, Japan
- Education: Berklee College of Music
- Occupations: Violinist, composer
- Spouse: Tom Farrell

Reiko Nakano (born 1983) is a violinist, founder of Strings by Reiko, and director of Sound Roads Music (music school).

== Early life ==
Nakano was born in Tokyo, Japan. At age three, Nakano began playing the violin. She studied classical music. Nakano was an accomplished violinist in classical music.

== Education ==
At age 18, Nakano traveled from Japan to Boston, Massachusetts, United States to study contemporary music. In 2005, Nakano earned a bachelor's degree in music from Berklee College of Music. Nakano's study was in the field of jazz and world music.

== Career ==
While Nakano was a student, she performed with many pop, rock, R&B, and rap artists including Kenny Barron, Michael Brecker, Gary Burton, Kelly Clarkson, P. Diddy, Richard Evans, Ariana Grande, Dave Grusin, Charlie Haden, Oliver Heldens, Elton John, Donna McElroy, Nicki Minaj, Rihanna, T-Pain, Dianna Reeves, Lee Ritenour, Snoop Dogg, Steven Tyler, Kanye West, and John Williams.

In January 2010, Nakano founded Strings by Reiko (SBR), a music group that is a string ensemble. The group's repertoire includes classical music, jazz, tango, rock, and pop arranged for a string ensemble presentation.

Since 2011, Nakano has performed violin on stage in venues such as the MGM Grand Garden in Las Vegas, Walt Disney Concert Hall and Staple Center in Los Angeles. Nakano performed violin on stage at the Billboard Music Awards in Las Vegas, Nevada and at the NBA All Stars Game Half Time Show in Los Angeles, California, and Walt Disney Concert Hall in Los Angeles, California.(February 20, 2011) - as herself performing violin with Rihanna.

In addition to playing the violin, Nakano is also an arranger and composer. Nakano is also a music instructor. In July 2015, Nakano founded and became the director of Sound Road Music, a music education school in Santa Monica, California.

== Personal life ==
Nakano's husband is Tom Farrell, a musician who has been playing guitar since the age of twelve. In 2011, Nakano and Emi Gilbert supported the efforts of the Japanese Red Cross on recovery of the people affected by the Tōhoku earthquake and tsunami

== Discography ==
=== Album ===
- 2007 Let It Go by Josh Nelson, jazz - violin.
- 2010 Timeless, rap - violin.
- 2010 Timeless: Arthur Verocai. Live At Luckman Theatre. (March 15, 2009), jazz - violin.
- Timeless:Suite for Ma Dukes by Miguel Atwood-Ferguson, rap - violin.
- 2010 When Love Happens: The Loving Day Concert by Sandra Booker, jazz - violin.
- 2012 The Salesman and the Shark by Sean Rowe, Pop/Rock - violin.
- 2016 Live from Lexx's Mom's Garage by Steel Panther - violin.
- 2018 Heaven and Earth (Kamasi Washington album) by Kamasi Washington, jazz - violin.

=== Single ===
- 2012 If You Love Me by Joy Valencia - strings.
- 2012 Horses by Sean Rowe - viola.
- 2012 Long Way Home by Sean Rowe - viola.
- 2012 The Ballad of Buttermilk Falls by Sean Rowe - viola.
- 2012 The Wall by Sean Rowe - viola.

== Filmography ==
Selected list of Nakano's film, music video, and commercial video.

- 2003 Cafe and Tobacco - Film directed by Michael Justiz. Musician.
- 2006 Existence - Film directed by Anthony Leonardo III. Musician: violin
- 2008 After Roberto - Film directed by Louis Fusco and Marc L. Fusco. Musician: violin.
- 2009 Your Decision music video by Alice In Chains (2009) - as herself performing on a violin.
- 2010 Rosario - Film directed by Albert Martinez. Violin.
- 2010 Tico Tico - as herself performing on a violin with Tom Farrell.
- 2009 Na Boca Dol Sol from Timeless III of IV: Arthur Verocai (March 15, 2009) - as herself performing on violin.
- 2010 Blackbird - as herself performing on a violin with Tom Farrell.
- 2010 Don't You Worry About A Thing - as herself performing on a violin with Tom Farrell.
- 2011 Prayer for Japan Earthquake and Pacific Tsunami Fund - as herself performing on violin.
- 2011 Matuss at Standard, MDW - as herself performing on a violin with DJ Matuss and Rockachic.
- 2011 Nada Sousou (涙そうそうー) - as herself performing on a violin.
- 2012 Hewett-Packard dv67 intel 2nd generation commercial (2012) - as herself performing on a violin.
- 2012 Somewhere Over The Rainbow - as herself performing on a violin.
- 2014 Westpac Bank - Wedding from Westpac Australian commercial (2014) - as herself performing on a violin.
- 2015 America's Next Model season 22 Finale Runway Show - as herself performing on a violin.
- 2015 The Tonight Show with Jay Leno (2015) - as herself performing on violin with Surrender by Il Volo.
- Uber commercial (2017) - as herself performing on a violin.

== Other performances ==
- 2007 Live Earth concert at Giants Stadium in New Jersey (July 7, 2007) - as herself on a violin with Kelly Clark singing Sober.
- 2011 Billboard Music Awards at MGM Grand Garden Arena in Las Vegas, Nevada (May 22, 2011) - as herself performing violin with Far East Movement, a hip hop/pop group.
- 2011 NBA All-Star Game Half Time Show at Staples Center in Los Angeles, California (February 20, 2011) - as herself performing violin with Rihanna.
- 2013 Two Steps From Hell Live Concert at Walt Disney Concert Hall in Los Angeles, California (June 14, 2013) - as herself performing violin.
- 2014 American Music Awards Main Show at Nokia Theater L.A. Live in Los Angeles (November 23, 2014) - as herself performing on a violin in Bed of Lies with Nicki Minaj and Skylar Grey.

== See also ==
- List of Berklee College of Music alumni
- List of jazz violinists
