= Bernard Larmande =

French actor (1941–2025)

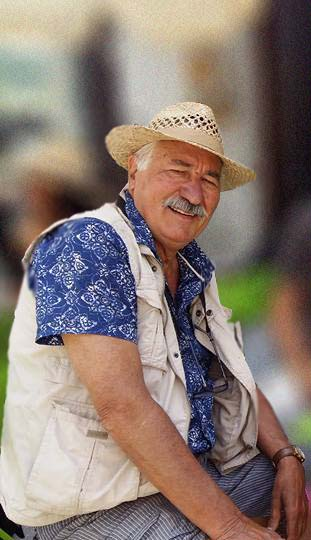
- Larmande in 2022
- Born: 6 October 1941; Villeneuve-de-Berg, France
- Died: 17 November 2025 (aged 84)
- Occupation: Actor

Bernard Larmande (French: [bɛʁnaʁ laʁmɑ̃d]; 6 October 1941 – 17 November 2025) was a French actor.

Married to actress Sylvie Genty, he was best known for his role for portraying a medical examiner in numerous episodes of Navarro.

Larmande died on 17 November 2025, at the age of 84.

== Filmography ==
=== Film ===
- I as in Icarus (1979)
- Fallait pas !... (1996)
- Fanny (2013)

=== Television ===
- Julien Fontanes, magistrat (1980)
- Navarro (1991–2006)
- Two's a Crowd (1997)
- Plus belle la vie (2006)
