= Gentlemen Hall =

- Origin: Boston, Massachusetts, United States
- Genres: Alternative, Indie pop
- Years active: 2008–2015
- Past members: Gavin Merlot; Rory Given; Bradford Alderman; Phil Boucher; Seth Hachen; Joe Baer Magnant; Cobi Mike
- Website: www.gentlemenhall.com

Gentlemen Hall was an American indie pop band from Boston, Massachusetts. The band consisted of Gavin Merlot (lead vocals, guitar), Rory Given (bass guitar), Bradford Alderman (synthesizers), Phil Boucher (drums), and Seth Hachen (flute, piccolo, synthesizers).

== History ==
=== Gentlemen Hall (2008–2015) ===
Some of Gentlemen Hall's members attended Berklee College of Music, where they were known as "those gentlemen down the hall". The first radio station to play one of their songs was Boston's WFNX. Boston's 92.9 also played tracks throughout the summer, which helped the band gain attention.

In 2009 MTV awarded them the Video Music Award (VMA) for "Best Breakout Boston Artist". In 2010 the Boston Phoenix named them "Best New Local Act". Two years later in 2012, the magazine would award them "Boston's Best Act". In 2011 the band recorded the EP, "When We All Disappear", with producer Michael Seifert and mixed by Michael Seifert and Tony Maserati, and shortly thereafter began touring in support of their freshman EP. The band made their national television debut when they performed live on the Billboard Awards on the television network ABC on May 22, 2011. Ice cream company Ben and Jerry's has also created a signature smoothie in the band's name, available throughout its Boston and Cambridge, Massachusetts locations. The band also garnered two Boston Music Awards in November 2011, for "Pop Rock Artist of the Year" and "Video of the Year" for their song "Close to Me" (Directed by Ethan Goldhammer).

In 2013, the band's song "Sail Into the Sun" was featured in Target and Samsung commercials internationally. The band's music has also been featured in several television programs, including The CW Television Network's 90210 (TV series) and American Broadcasting Company's Pretty Little Liars (TV series).

In September 2014, the band performed at Boston Calling Music Festival.

On April 8, 2015 the band announced via Twitter that they decided to split. They invited fans to follow their core members as the band "Tribe Society". Cobi Mike also launched a solo career, under the moniker Cobi.

== Band members ==
Past members

- Gavin Merlot – Lead vocals, guitar
- Rory Given – Bass guitar
- Bradford Alderman – Keyboards, synthesizers
- Phil Boucher – Drums, percussion, glockenspiel
- Seth Hachen – flute, piccolo, synthesizers

== Discography ==
=== Albums ===
- Give Us Roots, Give Us Wings (2010)
- When We All Disappear (2011)
- Lost Levels (2015)

=== EPs ===
- Gentlemen Hall (2009)

=== Singles ===
- "Sail into the Sun" (2013)
