= Chatham Baroque =

Instrumental ensemble

- Origin: Pittsburgh, Pennsylvania, U.S.
- Genres: Early music, Baroque
- Years active: 1990–present
- Label: Dorian
- Members: Andrew Fouts (baroque violin), Patricia Halverson (viola da gamba), Scott Pauley (theorbo & baroque guitar)
- Past members: Julie Andrijeski (baroque violin), Jeffrey Stock (recorders), Emily Davidson (baroque violin), Vivian Montgomery (harpsichord)
- Website: www.chathambaroque.org

Chatham Baroque is an instrumental ensemble.

== History ==
The group was founded in 1990. The trio of baroque violin, viola da gamba, theorbo and baroque guitar tours nationally and internationally, has recorded seven CDs on the Dorian label and hosts a concert series in Pittsburgh.

Chatham Baroque has toured across the United States and in South America and Mexico, the Virgin Islands, and Canada.

== Personnel ==
- Andrew Fouts, baroque violin
- Patricia Halverson, viola da gamba
- Scott Pauley, theorbo, lute and baroque guitar

=== Noted guest artists ===
Notable guest artists include Philip Anderson, Julie Andrijeski, Andrew Appel, Allison Edberg, Danny Mallon, Sherazade Panthanki, Stephen Schultz, and Adam Pearl., and Paul V. Miller.

== Discography ==
Chatham Baroque has 11 professionally recorded CDs: The Undiscovered Viola d'amore (2023), No Holds Barred (2017), Bach & Before (2013), Alla Luce (2009), Sweet Desire (2008), Chatham Baroque Live (2006), Henry Purcell Sonatas and Theatre Music (2002), Reel of Tulloch (2001), Españoleta (2000, re-release 2017), Danse Royale (1999), Sol y Sombra (1999), and The Scotch Humor (1998).
