= Kris Bergstrom =

American taiko player

Kristofer Bergstrom
- Born: July 12, 1976 (age 50); Littleton, Colorado, United States
- Instruments: taiko, koto, shamisen, turntable
- Years active: 2003–present

Kristofer Bergstrom is a leading American taiko player. He is a former member of Los Angeles-based taiko quartet, On Ensemble. In addition to taiko, Bergstrom plays the shamisen, koto, and turntable.

== Biography ==
=== Personal life ===
Kristofer Bergstrom was born on July 12, 1976, in Littleton, Colorado, to Jon and Diane Bergstrom. He has a sister named Nicole. When he was growing up, his family moved around, and Kris lived in Texas and Louisiana before moving to California in 1985. Kris is a vegan and an avid skateboarder.

=== Collegiate taiko ===
Bergstrom began playing taiko while attending Stanford University. At New Student Orientation, he attended a performance by the collegiate group Stanford Taiko, which prompted him to audition for the group. He intended to study Physics and English while at Stanford. His years as a member of Stanford Taiko encouraged him to consider a career as a professional taiko player. Through Stanford Taiko, he met fellow On Ensemble member, Shoji Kameda.

During the summer of 1998, Bergstrom interned for San Jose Taiko with Kameda as one of San Jose Taiko's first summer interns. Over this internship period, a discussion between Bergstrom and Kameda entertained the idea of creating a taiko group, which are the roots for On Ensemble. In order to pursue professional taiko, he dropped Physics from his course of study and began concentrating more on music. He continued to major in English as it seemed relevant to musical composition. He graduated Stanford with a degree in English in 1999.

=== Post-college years in Japan ===
After graduating Stanford in 1999, Bergstrom spent time in Japan to study Japanese in order to learn more Japanese arts. His intention was to learn music more traditional than kumidaiko. When he first arrived in Japan, he visited Sado Island to see the taiko group Kodo for their earth day celebration. He then went to Hakodate, Hokkaido, where he would live for the next two years before moving to Tokyo for a year.

Bergstrom took up the traditional Japanese dance, Nihon Buyō, for two years in the Wakayagi school. He also practiced his taiko skills by renting a space from the Hakodate-based taiko group Hinokiya. This interaction resulted in a strong relationship forming between Kris Bergstrom and Hinokiya. Bergstrom performed with and composed for Hinokiya at times during his stay in Hakodate. This relationship also initiated contact between Stanford Taiko and Hinokiya. In addition, Bergstorm seriously studied the shamisen at this time.

In August 2001, Bergstrom, Shoji Kameda, and Masato Baba performed in Japan, bringing together three-fourths of On Ensemble before the inclusion of Michelle Fujii.

=== Shamisen training and natori ===
Recalling hearing about Japanese music styles of nagauta, gagaku, and noh as a kid, Bergstrom looked to study shamisen as something more traditionally Japanese than taiko. In order to learn the shamisen, Bergstrom searched for a teacher in the Hakodate phonebook in spring of 2000. He found Kineya Katsuyukie from the Kineya school of nagauta shamisen. In the first meeting between Katsuyukie, Bergstrom said he wanted to better understand the concept of "ma" in Japanese music.
While studying Bergstrom developed a close relationship with Katsuyukie similar to that of the traditional uchi-deshi apprenticeship system for Japanese arts. While he did not live with her, he performed chores and took lessons in the early morning before and after work.

Bergstrom received his natori for shamisen on November 8, 2008. He was one of few musicians in the United States honored with a natori. His natori is Kineya Katsukoujyu. Bergstrom continues to study with Katsuyukie, as a natori does not signify an end to studying under a teacher.

=== On Ensemble and contemporary taiko ===
Bergstrom currently resides in Los Angeles. In addition to performing, he teaches workshops on taiko.

== Artistic influences ==
=== Taiko studies ===
Kris Bergstrom has trained with various groups throughout his career in kumidaiko. He began his study through joining Stanford Taiko in college. While in Japan, he studied for a time under Kobayashi Tarou, a student of an original member of Oedo Sukeroku Taiko. In addition, he took lessons at the Nihon Taiko Dojo from 2001-2.

=== Taiko instructor ===
Bergstrom is well regarded as an instructor in the North American taiko community. His work as a taiko teacher can be seen through On Ensemble's educational outreach. As a taiko instructor, he has written a study aid to taiko practice called "30 Days to Better Shime". At the 2009 Taiko Conference, he released Taiko Games 2009, a series of games he created about taiko.

=== Copyleft philosophy ===
Bergstrom is a strong believer in the concept of copyleft, where creators encourage sharing and collaboration. He was attracted to the idea after learning of the free software community. Bergstrom uses free software for his administrative and creative work for On Ensemble. Under similar principle, his taiko teaching aids and all of his compositions are available free under the Free Art License, specifically the Free Art License 1.3.

== Works ==
=== Discography ===
- Ume in the Middle, On Ensemble. Turtlefield Music, 2009.
- Ukiyo Live: 2007, On Ensemble, 2007.
- Dust and Sand, On Ensemble, 2005.

=== DVD concerts ===
- Live at the Cerritos Center, On Ensemble, 2007.
- NEIRO, On Ensemble, 2006.
