= Yosef Gutman Levitt =

South African-born Israeli guitarist, upright bassist and composer

- יוסף גוטמן לויט
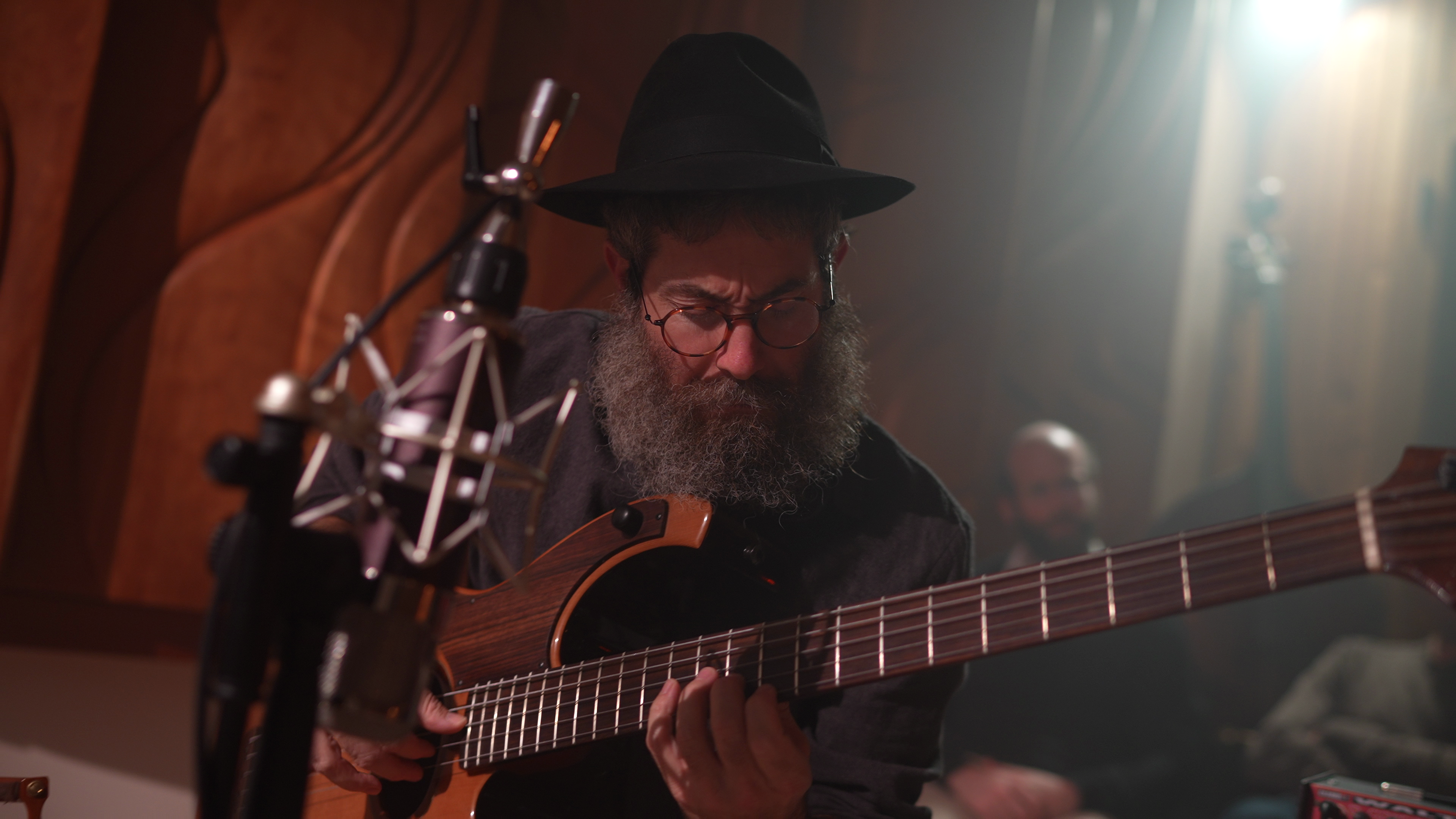
- Born: 1979 (age 46–47); South Africa
- Education: Berklee College of Music
- Occupations: Guitarist, upright bassist, and composer
- Website: yosefgutman.com

Yosef Gutman Levitt (Hebrew: יוסף גוטמן לווית) is a South African-born Israeli acoustic bass guitarist, upright bassist, and composer.

== Early life and education ==
Yosef Gutman Levitt was born in 1979 in South Africa. He grew up on a farm in Knoppieslaagte, a rural area, where he initially pursued piano lessons before switching to skateboarding at age 11. At 16, he rekindled his interest in music, inspired by the work of Weather Report's Jaco Pastorius, and began playing the bass guitar.

In 1998, Levitt attended Berklee College of Music in Boston on a scholarship, earned through his arrangement of the South African National Anthem. At Berklee, he practiced extensively and collaborated with fellow musicians such as Lionel Loueke.

== Career ==
After graduating from Berklee magna cum laude, Levitt relocated to New York City to pursue a jazz career.

In New York, Levitt faced challenges establishing his career. He worked in various jobs, including in restaurants, while performing in local venues. He played with musicians such as Ben Monder and Lionel Loueke during this time. Later, he eventually took a hiatus from performing to reflect on his artistic direction.

During this break, Levitt contributed to the Oprah Winfrey Show as a commercial music producer. He also developed skills in software programming and design, leading to the creation of a technology startup called Mad Mimi.

In 2009 Levitt emigrated with his family to Israel, and settled in Jerusalem. He continued to focus on his technology venture, Mad Mimi until its acquisition in 2014 by GoDaddy. Following the acquisition Levitt worked on a number of startups with a return in 2018 to music, focusing on the acoustic bass guitar. He has since recorded eight albums, using a custom 5-string bass guitar designed by Harvey Citron and Steve Swallow. His music often incorporates traditional Hasidic melodies, Nigunim, with jazz, Latin, Spanish, newgrass, classical and Middle Eastern influences.

In 2019, Levitt released his debut album, Chabad Al Hazman, in collaboration with kamancheh and ney player Yagel Haroush, pianist Tom Oren and percussionist Itamar Doari.

Subsequent collaborations included two albums (Tal Yasis and Tsuf harim) with guitarist Tal Yahalom. In 2022, Levitt released his first trio recording, Upside Down Mountain, with Ofri Nehemya and Omri Mor.

In 2023, Levitt collaborated with Lionel Loueke and released an album named Soul Song.

== Albums ==
- Chabad Al Hazman (2019)
- The Sun Sings to Hashem (2020)
- The Moon Sings to Hashem (2020)
- Upside Down Mountain (2022)
- Ashreinu (2022)
- Soul Song (2023)
- Tsuf Harim (2023)
- Melodies of Light (2023)
- The World And Its People (2024)
- Unity (2024)
