= Conservatory of Nice =

French music and dance conservatoire

Coordinates: 43°43′32″N 7°16′21″E

The Conservatoire Pierre Cochereau à rayonnement régional de Nice (C.R.R. de Nice) is a state-run regional music and dance conservatoire which serves Alpes-Maritimes, Nice in France.

== History ==
The conservatoire was founded by Adeline Ballet, a pianist, in 1916. It is named after its former director Pierre Cochereau, who served from 1962 to 1979.

In the musical field, the conservatory provides instruction on string instruments (violin, viola, cello, contrabass), woodwinds (flute, oboe, bassoon, saxophone, clarinet), brass (horn, trumpet, trombone, tuba) as well as polyphonic instruments (piano, accordion, guitar, harp, organ, percussion). Singing, writing and musical composition classes, as well as early music lessons are also provided. The ballet and contemporary sections within the dance programme of the conservatory; and the dramatic arts are approached by interpretation, vocal work and improvisation workshops.

In 2009, the French soprano Elizabeth Vidal was appointed professor of lyric art.

The current director of the conservatoire is Thierry Muller, who has served since February 2016.

== Notable alumni ==
- Maurice Jaubert (1900–1940), composer of film music
- Freda Betti (1924–1979), opera singer
- Claude Bolling (1930–2020), French jazz pianist
- Christian Ferras (1933–1982), violinist
- Scott Ross (1951–1989), American harpsichordist
- Gilbert Bezzina, violinist and opera conductor
- Philippe Bianconi (born 1960), pianist
- Carla Lazzari (born 2005), French singer
- Clairemarie Osta (born 1970)
- David Kadouch (born 1985), pianist and chamber musician
- Bruno Destrez (born 1959), bassist and luthier
