= Bruno Destrez =

Bruno Destrez (born September 13, 1959 in Épernay, France) is a French/American bassist, composer, and luthier specializing in the construction and repair of double basses.

== Early life and education ==
Destrez studied at the National Conservatory of Nice (Premier Prix in 1981) and continued his education (B.M.) at the Berklee College of Music in Boston, where he lived until 1991. He then moved to New York City where he has been living since.

== Career ==
=== As a musician ===
Destrez has performed with trios and quartets featuring such players as Mick Goodrick, John Abercrombie, Matt Wilson, Dewey Redman, Salvatore Bonafede, and John Riley. He also has a career as a sideman with such players as David "Fathead" Newman, Marlena Shaw, Ricky Ford, Vaughn Hawthorn, and performances with various classical orchestras and Broadway shows.

Besides being an improviser, he has composed modern jazz pieces that he has performed with his trios and quartets. Some of his works have also been recorded by such artists as the Chris Parker Trio, Vaughn Hawthorn, and Kyoko Oyobe. He wrote the Music for Flyboy, a play by Yvon Adrian where the music is central to the script, and he provided music for the Richard Broadman film Present Memory (1989). He has participated in numerous audio-visual and choreographic projects.

=== As a luthier ===
As a luthier, Destrez has adapted his techniques to the instruments of symphony orchestras and jazz musicians around the world (National Italian Orchestra Santa Cecila, OCB Barcelona, members of the Scala of Milano, Palermo Orchestra Sinfonica Siciliana, the Cleveland Orchestra, Maximillian Dimoff, Scott Haigh, Diana Gannett, Andrea Pighi, etc.) and to the instruments of some of the greatest jazz bass players alive, such as Ron Carter, Marc Johnson, Richard Davis, Larry Grenadier, Peter Washington, Gerald Cannon, Paolino Dalla Porta, Palle Danielsson, and several others.

Since 2016 he has been a faculty of the Milt Hinton Institute and has given masterclasses at Oberlin College and Conservatory where he was the bass luthier between 2016 and 2019. He is currently living in New York City. As a bass player and luthier he frequently holds workshops and masterclasses in the U.S., Europe, South America, Puerto Rico, and Japan.
