= Allan Slutsky =

American musician

- Also known as: Doctor Licks
- Born: c. 1952 (age 72–73); Philadelphia, Pennsylvania, U.S.
- Occupations: musician, arranger, author, film and record producer
- Instruments: guitar, mandolin, ukulele, tenor banjo
- Years active: 1978–present
- Member of: The Night Cafe
- Website: nightcafetrio.com

Allan Slutsky, also known by his pen name, Dr. Licks, (born c. 1952) is an American music arranger, producer, guitarist and historian. He has authored several books including biographies on musicians James Jamerson and Bobby Rydell. He is the winner of a Grammy Award for Best Compilation Soundtrack Album for a Motion Picture, Television or Other Visual Media.

== Life and career ==
Slutsky was born in Philadelphia, Pennsylvania. He studied music at Temple University. He went on to pursue guitar studies at the Berklee College of Music in Boston and graduated in 1978.

After college, Slutsky returned to Philadelphia and began transcribing music under the name "Dr. Licks". He has authored several instructional and method books.

Slutsky wrote the 1989 book Standing in the Shadows of Motown, which profiles the life of the Funk Brothers' bass guitarist James Jamerson. The book went on to win the Rolling Stone/BMI Ralph J. Gleason Music Book Award in 1989. Slutsky coauthored the 2016 book Bobby Rydell: Teen Idol on the Rocks, a biography of Bobby Rydell and coauthored by Rydell.

Slutsky produced the documentary film Standing in the Shadows of Motown. The film was released in 2002. The film expanded the scope of Slutsky's 1989 book and covered The Funk Brothers group of musicians as a whole. The film won several awards including two Grammys in 2003. (Note: The two Grammys were awarded in categories Best Compilation Soundtrack for Visual Media and Best Traditional R&B Performance. Other awards included the New York Film Critics Circle Award and the National Society of Film Critics Award.)

== Books ==
- (1982) Doctor Licks Vol II: Rock's Hottest Guitar Solos Transcribed Note for Note
- (1982) Doctor Licks Vol V: Rock's Hottest Guitar Solos Transcribed Note for Note
- (1987) The Art of Playing Rhythm & Blues Volume One: The 50s and 60s
- (1989) Standing in the Shadows of Motown: The Life and Music of Legendary Bassist James Jamerson
- (1997) The Funkmasters: The Great James Brown Rhythm Sections 1960-1973
- (2002) Beyond Basics: Funk Guitar Rhythm Chops
- (2016) Bobby Rydell: Teen Idol on the Rocks: A Tale of Second Chances

== Notes ==
- Angela G. King (January 22, 2003). "A Side Of Motown Comes Out Of The Shadows". The Montclair Times. Archived from the original on February 23, 2003.
- "At last, Motown's song of praise". The Age. January 26, 2003. Archived from the original on April 14, 2024.
