= Alicia Camiña =

Spanish jazz saxophonist (born 1997)

- Born: Alicia Camiña Ginés; November 16, 1997 (age 28); Sevilla, Andalucía, Spain.
- Genres: Jazz
- Occupations: Saxophonist; composer; producer
- Instruments: Saxophone
- Years active: 2019–present
- Website: www.aliciacaminagines.com

Alicia Camiña Ginés (born November 16, 1997) is a Spanish jazz and pop saxophonist, composer, and producer.

== Early life ==
Alicia Camiña Ginés was born on November 16, 1997, in Sevilla, Andalucía.

Camiña began playing saxophone at the age of 7. She attended CPM Cristóbal de Morales and Conservatorio Superior de Sevilla, where she studied saxophone. In 2019, she transferred to Berklee College of Music in Boston, receiving an M.M. in saxophone performance.

== Career ==
Camiña first performed live at the Palazzo Strozzi in Florence, Italy. Following, she was a touring member with the SYM Don Bosco Orchestra in Europe. Later, Camiña performed as a soloist her own composition with Madrid Philjarmonic Orchestra. In 2021, Camiña's debut album ''Revolution'' was released by Orpheus Classical.

She is the featured saxophone instrumentalist for the theme to the first season of the Netflix series Insiders.

In 2022, Camiña toured with the show The Life and Music of George Michael in the US and Canada.

Camiña released the singles “Think of Voyage” and “De Mi Tierra”, a fusion track of flamenco and jazz.

== Discography ==
=== Studio albums ===
- Revolution (2021)

=== Singles ===
- Think of Voyage (2022)
- Jaho (2022)
- Goodbye (2023)
- De mi tierra (2023)
