= Eitetsu Hayashi =

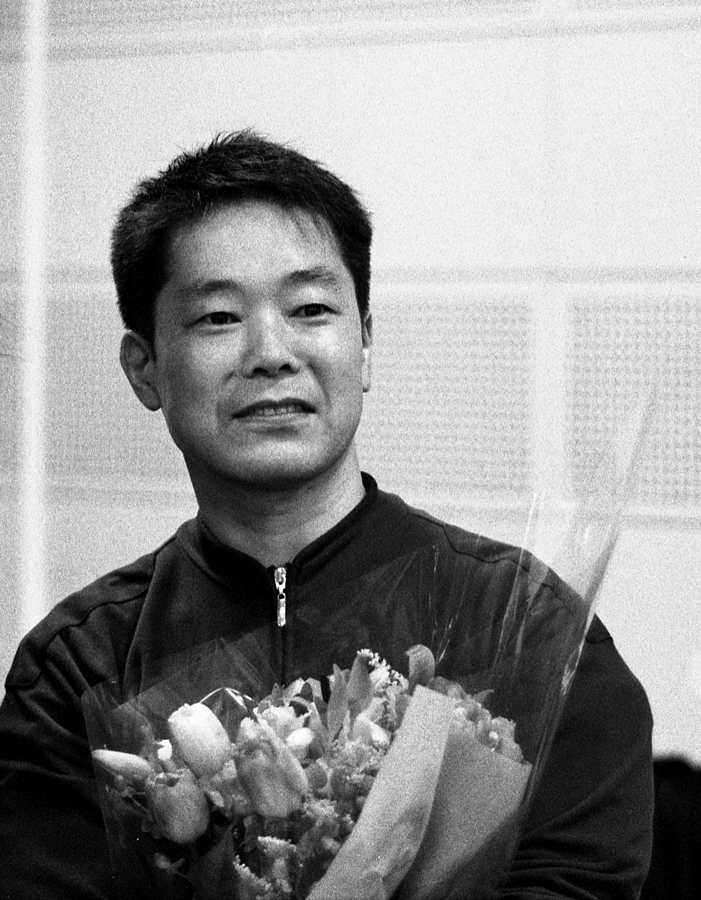
- Eitetsu Hayashi accepting flowers after a 2001 concert in Tokyo.

Background information
- Birth name: Eitetsu Hayashi
- Born: February 2, 1952 (age 73); Tōjō, Japan
- Genres: Taiko
- Occupation: Solo performer
- Years active: 1971–pres.
- Website: eitetsu.net

Eitetsu Hayashi (林英哲, Hayashi Eitetsu) (born February 2, 1952) is an acclaimed Japanese musician best known for his solo performance work in taiko. Hayashi joined the group Ondekoza at an early age. Later, after parting from group, helped found the taiko group Kodo, though he quickly left to begin a solo career. Hayashi has performed in notable venues such as Carnegie Hall in 1984 and was the first featured taiko performer at the institution. He is also the recipient of multiple awards recognizing the cultural value of his work.

== History ==
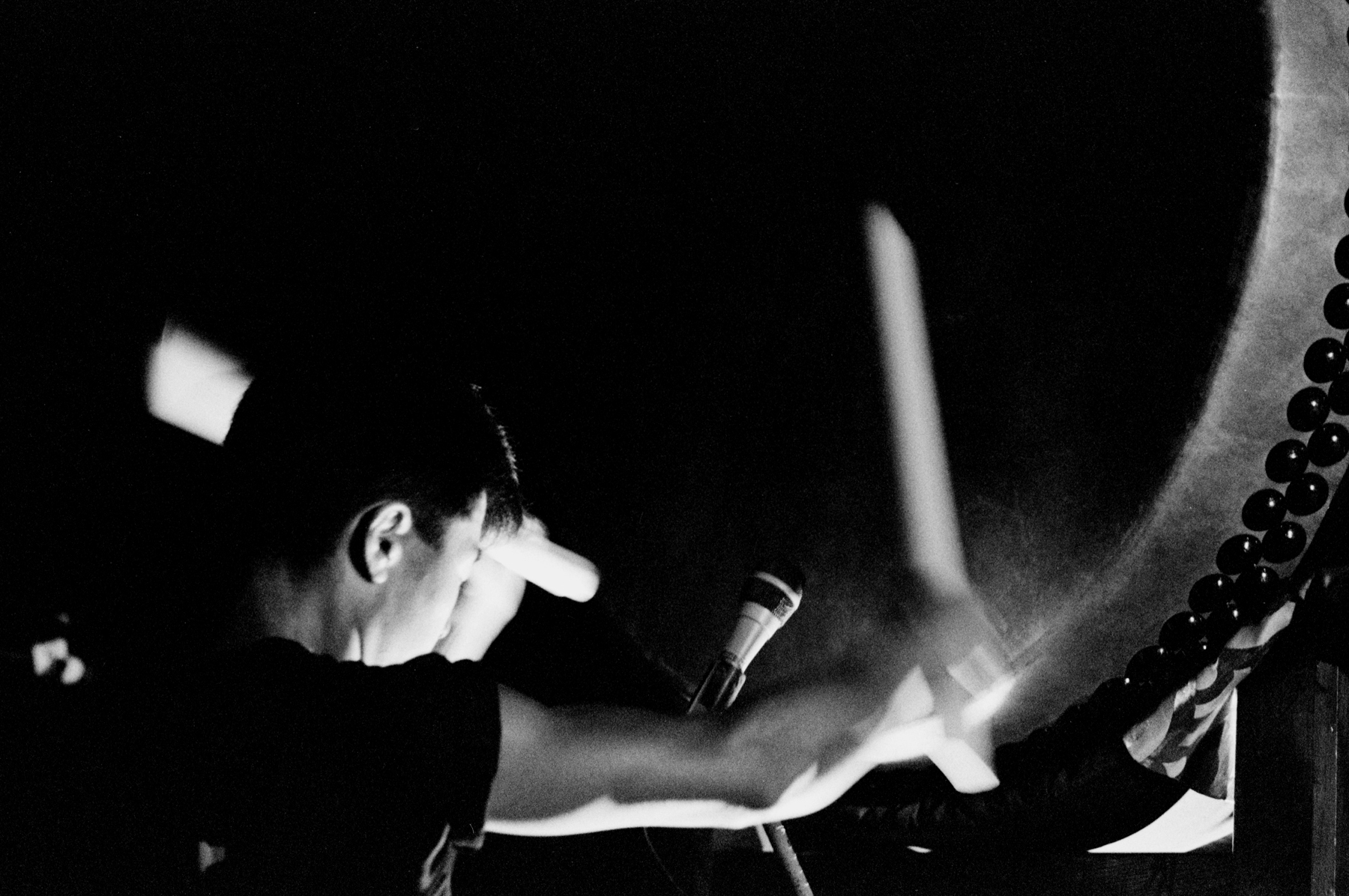
Eitetsu Hayashi performing on an ō-daiko in 1987

=== Early life ===
Hayashi was born on 2 February 1952 in a mountainous town called Tōjō in Hiroshima Prefecture and grew up in a Buddhist temple, where his father was a monk in the local Shingon sect. Hayashi was the youngest of eight children. Hayashi reported that in his youth, he listened to The Beatles and was playing drums in a western-style band. He also wanted to be a graphic designer, but gave up on these aspirations upon not being accepted to the Tokyo Arts University.

=== Ondekoza ===
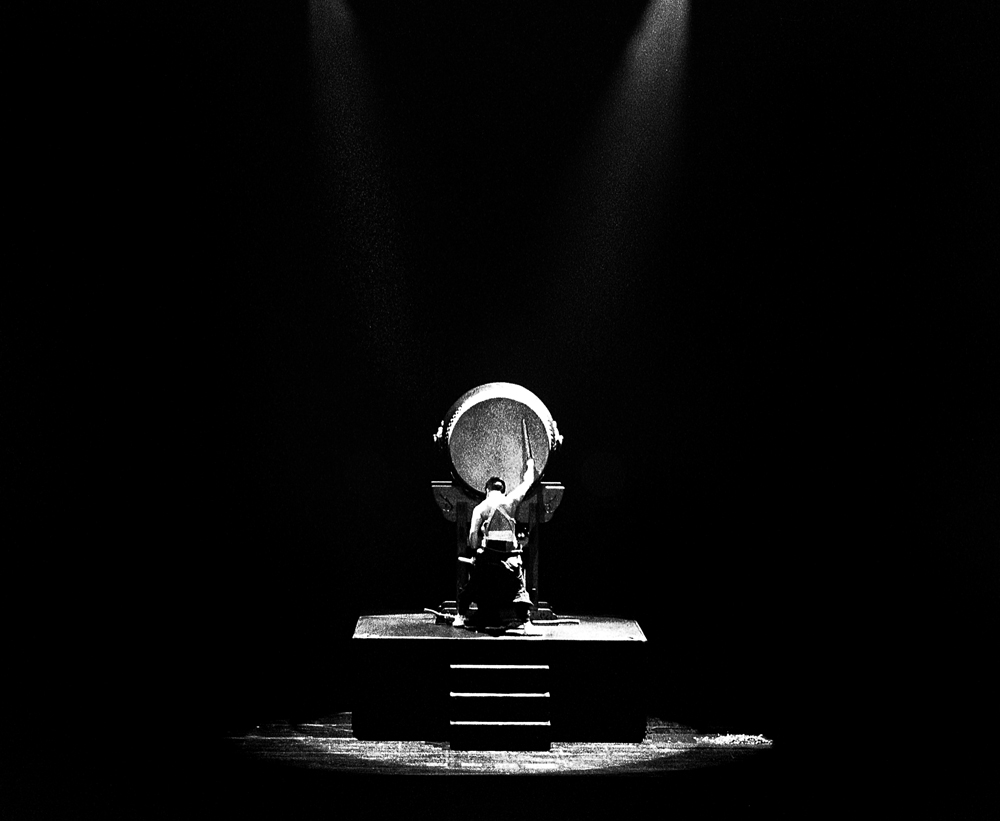
Eitetsu Hayashi solo performing in a 2001 concert in Tokyo

Hayashi joined the taiko group Ondekoza at age 19 sometime after hearing a radio advertisement about a summer seminar featuring the designer Tadanori Yokoo on Sado Island. Yokoo did not arrive to the island, though Hayashi met and began training with Ondekoza leader Tagayasu Den shortly thereafter. At the time, Ondekoza was training to raise money to build a vocational college on Sado Island itself. In regards to the training itself, Hayashi described it as "Spartan," because it emphasized a stoic nature in order to show a "strong spirit" during their performances. In addition to direct practice in drumming, even in freezing conditions, Hayashi also ran regularly as a part of his training with the group.

In 1972, in order to begin building a repertoire, Hayashi and two other members of Ondekoza traveled to Chichibu, Saitama to learn the festival piece Chichibu Yatai-bayashi, and spent one week attending and observing practice sessions of the local performers. However, learning the piece proved difficult; Hayashi explained, "Japanese folk music was...usually learned by memorizing a series of kuchi shoga....in addition to the fact that each player's method of playing the assigned part differed slightly and often featured an element of improvisation..." With considerable difficulty, Hayashi was able to transform the folk piece into a performance for Ondekoza, who used a completely different set of instruments. Later in 1975, Hayashi debuted with the rest of Ondekoza in the United States by playing taiko immediately after running the Boston Marathon. Hayashi continued this tradition of performing immediately after running the marathon an additional six times after 1975. In total, Hayashi played with Ondekoza for 11 years.

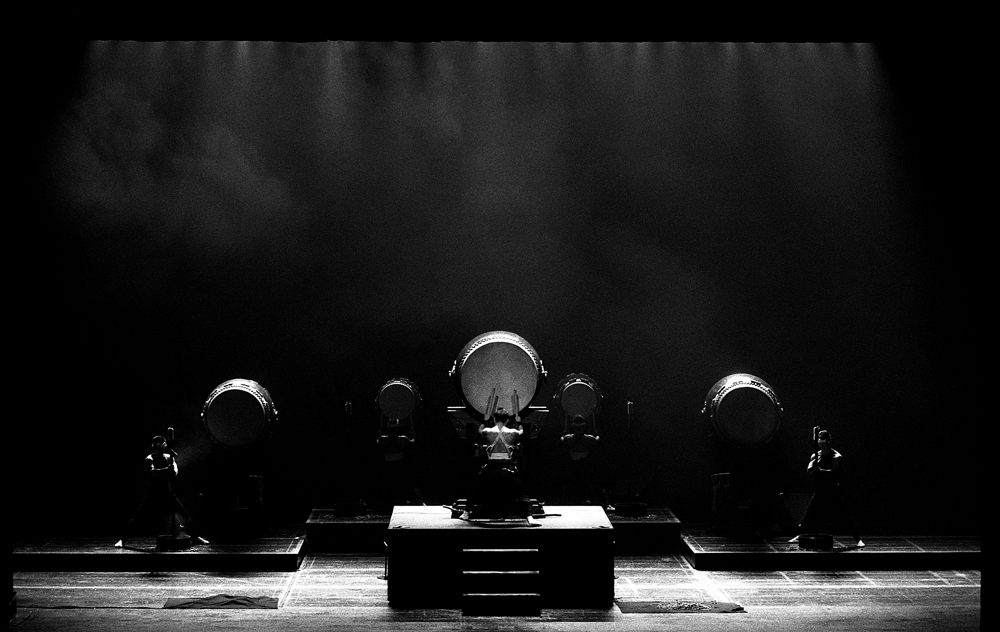
Eitetsu Hayashi performing on an ō-daiko with group in 2001

=== Kodo ===
In 1981, disagreement about musical and professional goals led to a split in Ondekoza. For a short while, there were actually two groups claiming to both be the legitimate Ondekoza, though this was soon settled when Hayashi and others left to form the group Kodo. Although the management of the new group was led by another player named Kawauchi Toshio, Hayashi was recognized as the lead player in the group. In accounts from Hayashi, he came up with the name kodo for the group during a meeting. The name of the group has two meanings: the first, "drum children," which was based on feedback from mothers that their music lulled their children to sleep. The second, "heartbeat," was based on the comparison that the sound of the drum mimics the sound of a mother's heartbeat on her child in the womb. However, after the name of the group was announced at Kodo's debut in Japan, Hayashi decided to leave the group and begin a solo career.

== Discography ==
Contributing artist

- The Rough Guide to the Music of Japan (1999, World Music Network)

== Awards ==
Name of Award	Organization	Year
Award for Promotion of Traditional Japanese Culture	Japan Arts Foundation	2001
Art Encouragement Prize (Popular Entertainment division) (芸術選奨文部大臣賞 （大衆芸能部門）)	Ministry of Education (Japan)	1997
Grand Prize, Fukuoka Prize	Fukuoka City (Japan)	2022
