= Yatai-bayashi =

Traditional taiko drum piece

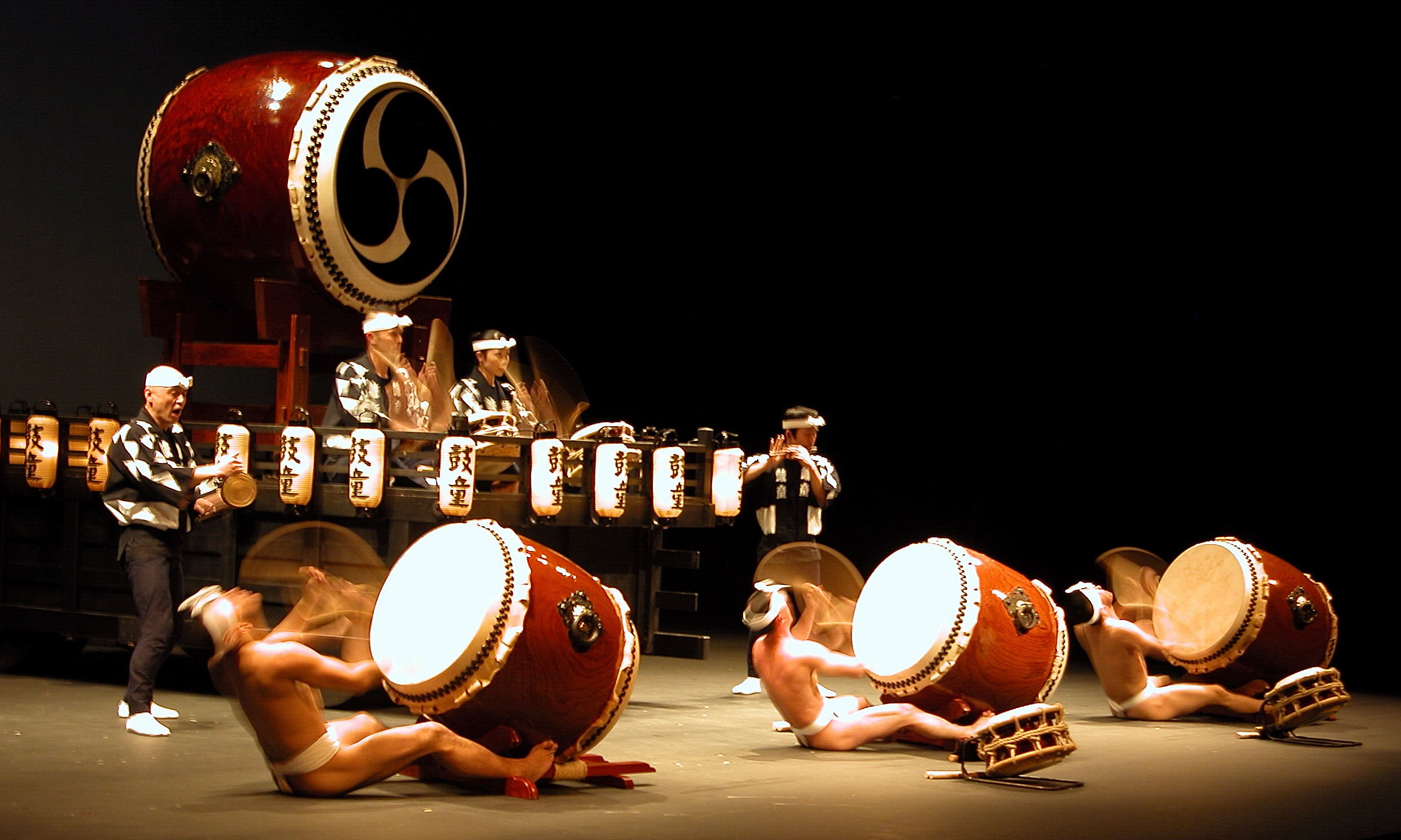
Taiko group Kodo illustrating the seated kata during a performance of Yatai-bayashi

Yatai-bayashi (屋台囃子; lit. festival cart orchestra) is a traditional taiko piece inspired by an annual festival in Chichibu, Japan. The piece been performed by many taiko ensembles, and became well-known through dramatic variations of the piece developed by Ondekoza and Kodo. Yatai-bayashi has been recognized as a piece that requires great physical endurance.

== History ==
Yatai-bayashi actually began as a somewhat different piece called Chichibu Yatai-bayashi (秩父屋台囃子, Chichibu yataibayashi), which is intended for a festival performance, rather than a stage performance. Chichibu Yatai-bayashi is normally played during a festival in Chichibu, Japan that occurs annually from December 3–4. More recently however, this particular arrangement has also been adopted for local performances on stage.

In 1972, members of the taiko group Ondekoza spent only one week in Chichibu in order to learn the piece from festival participants and adapt it for their future performances. In addition to the short time they had to learn the piece, there was difficulty in how folk music of this kind was usually taught: Chichibu players did not conceptualize the piece in terms of its underlying beat structure. Instead, these rhythms were memorized and even contained an element of improvisation from player to player. Ondekoza could not replicate the local techniques, so the piece was substantially changed so they were able to play it. In an interview with Ondekoza founder Eitetsu Hayashi, he said, "We were really bad drummers and we knew that the only way we could show we were trying our best was to speed the piece up." To make the performance more dramatic, players leaned farther back from the drum and a decrescendo-crescendo section was implemented. It was also the first ensemble piece that Ondekoza mastered together.

Ondekoza's arrangement of the piece was adopted broadly across Japan However, with these changes and others, it has been argued that this version of Yatai-bayashi is substantially different enough that it lacks the local nuance of the original from Chichibu.

== Performance structure ==
Although there are variations in how the piece is performed, Yatai-bayashi traditionally has at least five players: Two players on shime-daiko, one on chū-daiko, one fue player, and one kane player. Contemporary versions of the piece have used multiple chū-daiko to create an effect similar to a round. Performance of Yatai-bayashi is considered strenuous and requires considerable physical endurance.

In the original version that is performed for the festival in Chichibu, players are actually performing inside a festival float, called a yatai. They cannot be seen from the outside, and serve to direct and support those carrying the float. A single chu-daiko player begins playing a complex rhythm on a horizontally mounted drum that is low to the ground. The player is seated and leaning back while playing the drum as their legs are extended across the length of it. When the chu-daiko player is finished, another player switches with them and repeats the rhythm.

In the version developed by Ondekoza, the piece begins with two shime-daiko players playing the background, and soon after, a single and lead chu-daiko player begins playing the main rhythmic pattern. After going through this pattern twice, the next chu-daiko player begins while the first player fades out. This sequence is also repeated by the second player when the third chu-daiko player begins. When the third player completes the rhythm, the lead chu-daiko player transfers to a shime-daiko to perform a solo. When the solo is completed, the player returns to the chu-daiko, and all three players perform the main rhythm in unison to end the piece.
