= Dave Askren =

American jazz guitarist and educator

- Born: Milwaukee, Wisconsin, U.S.
- Genres: Jazz
- Occupation: Musician
- Instrument: Guitar
- Website: www.daveaskren.com

Dave Askren is an American jazz guitarist and educator.

== Musical career ==
Askren was born in Milwaukee, Wisconsin, but he grew up in Raleigh, North Carolina, and Dayton, Ohio, son of a church organist/piano teacher. He learned about jazz from local musicians whose interests went beyond rock and blues. Askren started on clarinet and saxophone, but switched to guitar when he was fourteen. In his early teens he belonged to professional bands that played rock, blues, and R&B at local venues. From 1976–1980, he attended Berklee College of Music in Boston and taught there during the 1980s, while playing gigs around Boston. He also worked with Delfeayo Marsalis, Antonio Hart, Kevin Eubanks, and Bob Moses.

In the 1990s, he moved to Los Angeles and was a sideman for La Toya Jackson and Marilyn McCoo. He has also worked with David King, Bobby Shew, Jimmy Branly, Sal Cracciolo, Gary Foster, Linda Hopkins, and Eddie Resto.

== Discography ==
- Re: Bill Evans (String Jazz, 2002)
- Rhubumba (Sea Breeze, 2004)
- Some Other Things (Sea Breeze, 2005)
- Trio Nuevo + (Daway, 2008)
- It's All About the Groove with Jeff Benedict (Daway, 2013)
- Among Friends with the Orion Saxophone Quartet (Tapestry, 2013)
- Holmes with the Jeff benedict Big Band (Tapestry, 2015)
- Come Together with Jeff Benedict (Tapestry, 2017)
- Paraphernalia - Music of Wayne Shorter with Jeff Benedict (Tapestry, 2020)
- Denver Sessions with Jeff Benedict (Tapestry, 2023)
