= Kodō (taiko group) =

Japanese taiko drumming troupe

Background information
- Origin: Sado Island, Japan
- Genre: Taiko
- Years active: 1981–present
- Label: Red Ink
- Website: www.kodo.or.jp

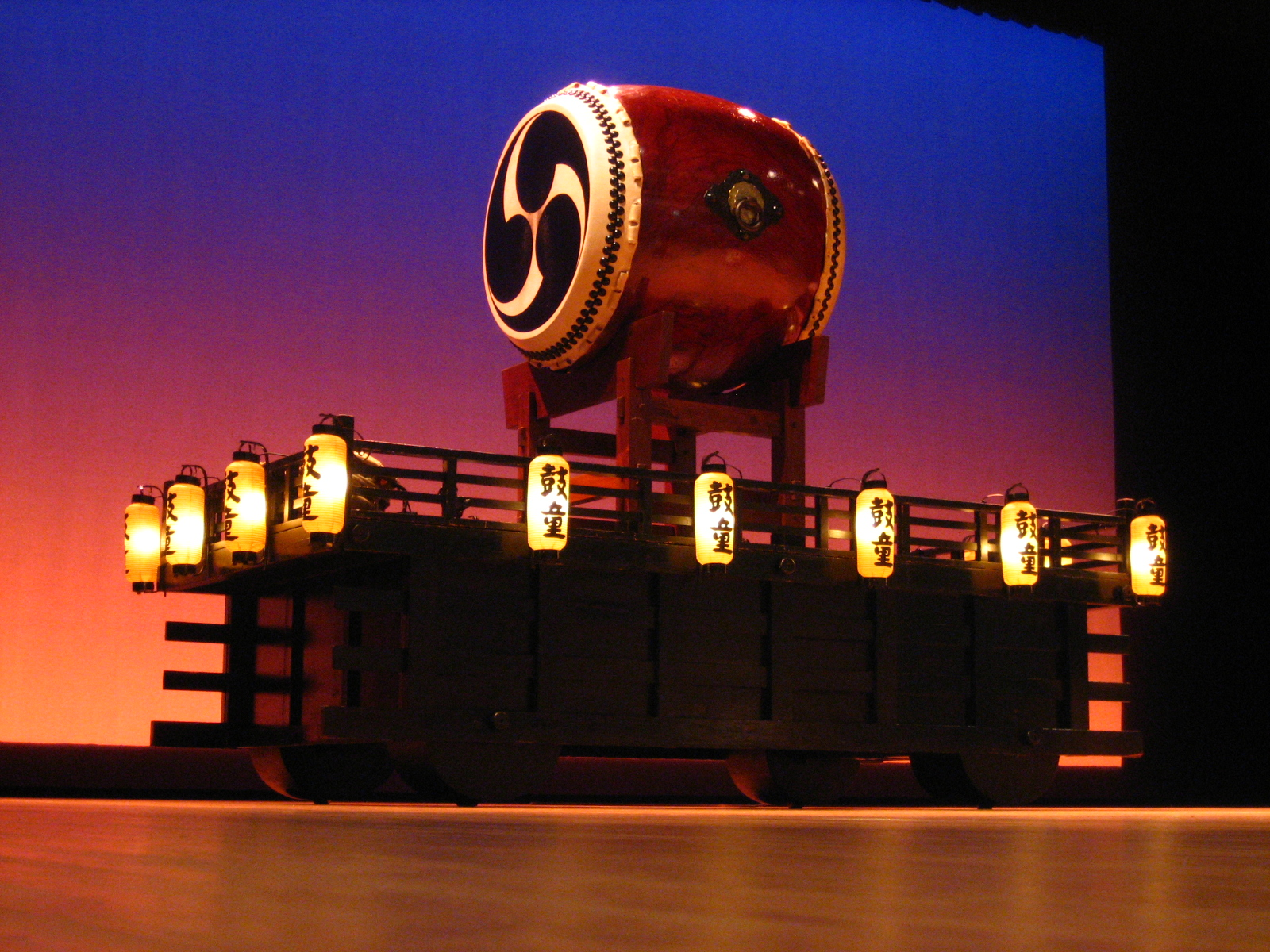
A taiko drum used by Kodo

Kodō (鼓童) is a professional taiko drumming troupe. Based on Sado Island, Japan, they have had a role in popularizing taiko drumming, both in Japan and abroad. They regularly tour Japan, Europe, and the United States. In Japanese the word "Kodō" conveys two meanings: "heartbeat" the primal source of all rhythm and, read in a different way, the word can mean "children of the drum".

Although taiko are the primary instrument in their performances, other traditional Japanese musical instruments such as fue and shamisen make an appearance on stage as do traditional dance and vocal performance. Kodō's repertoire includes pieces based on the traditional rhythms of regional Japan, pieces composed for Kodō by contemporary songwriters, and pieces written by Kodō members themselves. Since their debut at the Berlin Festival in 1981, Kodō has had almost 4,000 performances, spending about a third of the year overseas, a third touring in Japan and a third resting and preparing new material on Sado Island.

== History ==
Kodō was formed in 1981 and made their debut at the Berliner Philharmonie in the same year. Kodō is sometimes considered to be simply renamed from the taiko group Ondekoza organized in 1971. Indeed, Kodō was formed out of the existing members of Ondekoza, but their leader, Den Tagayasu, left the group before the transition and lead performer Eitetsu Hayashi left quickly thereafter. Tagayasu continued to use the name Ondekoza for his new group, and required the group to choose a new name. Hayashi, who departed from the group soon after its founding to begin a solo career, suggested the name "Kodō". Hayashi created the name based on the dual meaning of the word; the first, "drum children", was based on feedback from mothers that their music lulled their children to sleep. The second meaning, "heartbeat" originated from comparing the sound of taiko drums to the sound of a mother's heartbeat on her child in the womb.

The group spent the next 7 years touring Europe, Japan, North and South Americas and the Far East. Following this, they founded Kodō village on Sado Island, and also started an annual Earth Celebration, an international arts festival on Sado Island that is managed by the city of Sado and the Kodō Cultural Foundation.

Kodō had three sold out performances at the 1984 Olympic Arts Festival in Los Angeles, a 10-week event which preceded the 1984 Summer Olympics.

In 1989, the group held its first drum workshop, referred to as Kodō Juku which includes introducing their training regimen and their approach to taiko performance. These workshops are held up to four times a year and do not require any background in drumming.

The non-profit Kodō Cultural Foundation was established in 1997, and three years later, they founded the Kodō Arts Sphere America organization in North America. This organization started to present workshop tours in 2003.

== Reputation ==
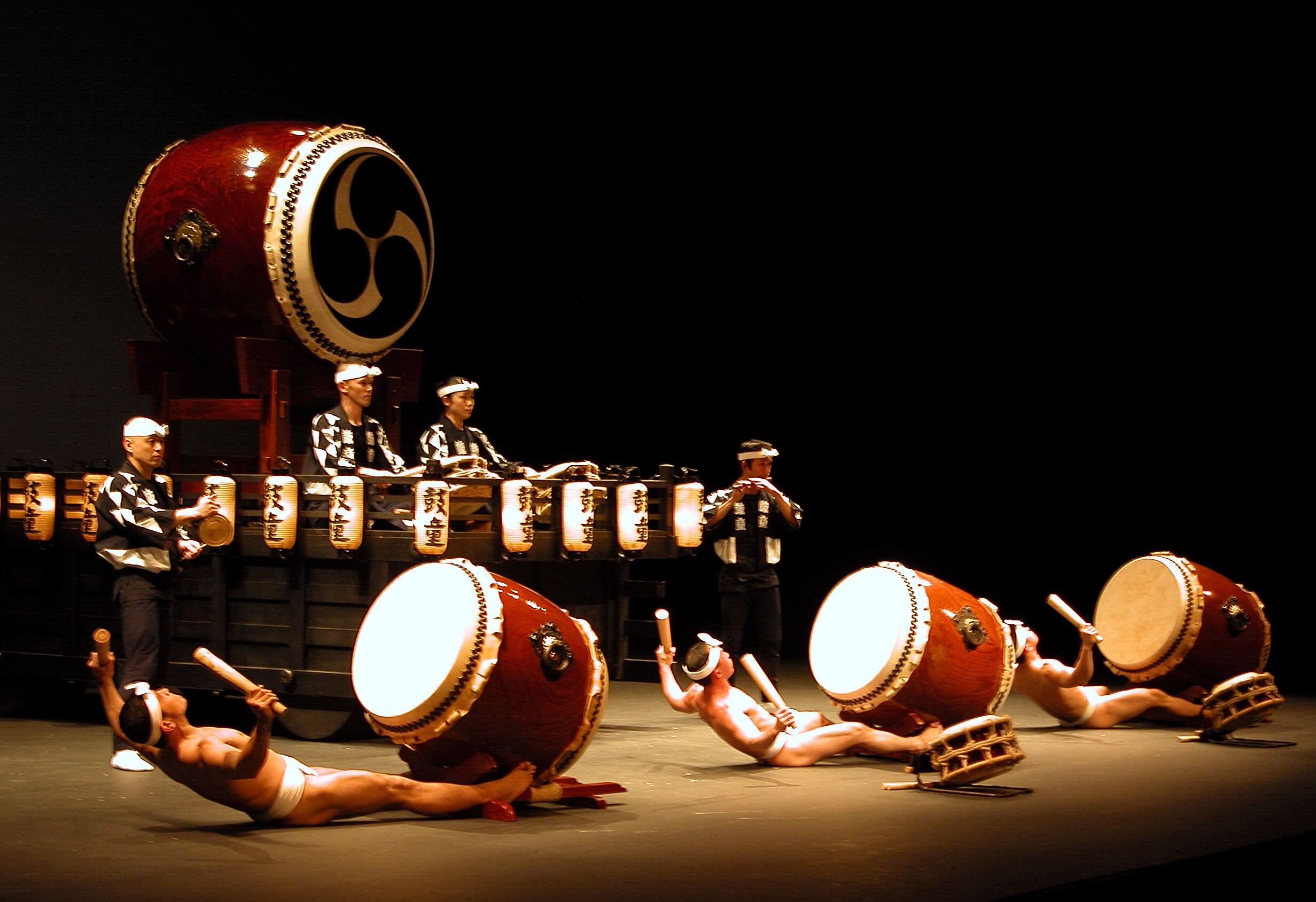
A 2007 performance of the piece Yatai-bayashi during the ending of the piece. The three performers in front playing chu-daiko are wearing fundoshi.

Kodō is arguably the most well-known and respected taiko group worldwide and has been considered an ambassador group for taiko performance outside Japan. One component of their reputation stems from their training regimen, which at one time, included long distance running twice daily. A report on Kodō's training in 1989 stated that their approach had been toned down, but was still "disciplined" according to the program director, where performers would only run ten kilometers each morning.

In performance, players are often seen wearing a sole loincloth called a fundoshi as a component of attire. Internal publications from the group state that they are used to help focus a player's strength while performing. Others have noted that the use of fundoshi clearly represents a masculine component to the Kodō's performance. After their performance at the 1984 Olympics, Mark Swed of the Los Angeles Herald wrote, "Glistening back muscles of a sweaty loin-clothed drummer are strikingly lit as he strikes the great o-daiko (large taiko) with massive sticks in a performance as much athletic as it is musical."

== Associated organizations ==
There are three organizations that handle Kodō's activities. Kitamaesen is the corporate that manages member salaries, employment, tour booking, and is a general managing entity. Otodaiku manages group copyrights, the development and sale of musical instruments used in Kodō's performance, and the group's recordings. The group's non-profit activities, such as the Sado Island Taiko Center (佐渡太鼓体験交流館, Sado Taiko Taiken Kōryūkan) are organized under the Kodo Cultural Foundation.

=== Kodō Village ===
Kodō Village is a collection of buildings intended for Kodō's management and tour staff, and represents their headquarters. The Village is situated in Ogi on the southern part of Sado Island. Construction of these buildings began in the mid 1980s. The first building, an administrative center, was completed in 1988, and by 1992, a rehearsal hall, a dormitory, and a reception house were also constructed.

Originally, the concept of the village was proposed by Den Tagayasu prior to his departure from the group; he intended to develop a sort of academy for artisan craft and performance arts. However, after the project was initiated by Toshio Kawauchi, its purpose shifted toward integrating Kodō's presence more permanently on Sado Island. Prior to Kodō Village, the group rented out an abandoned schoolhouse as its Apprentice Center. Furthermore, the Village was also used as a way to improve the group's relations with residents on Sado Island, which helped facilitate festivals such as the annual Earth Celebration Festival, which brings together musicians from around the world not only for performance purposes but also to exchange cultural ideas and crafts between Sado Island and the rest of the world.

== Awards ==
Kodō received the MIDEM Music Video (Long Form) Award at the 3rd International Visual Music Festival in Cannes in 1994, as well as the Japanese Foreign Ministry Award noting their cultural contributions through the Earth Celebration event on Sado Island. They were also the recipient of the Matsuo Performing Arts Award for Japanese Music in 2012.

== Members ==
As of May 2014, there are 32 performing members (26 men, six women) in Kodō and 28 staff members involved in Kitamaesen and Otodaiku. The Kodō Cultural Foundation maintains a staff of 12. Apprentices and part-time workers included, there are about 100 persons involved in Kodō or its related organizations.

Apprentices who hope to be performers spend two years living and training together communally in a converted school on Sado Island. After this period, apprentices who have been selected to become junior, probationary members spend one more year training and practicing in which they may be selected to become full members of Kodō.

Originally, Kodō members lived separately from the Sado Island community. This is still true of the younger members, who live together in the Kodō village, but senior members now live outside the village in nearby communities.

=== Performing members ===
As of May 2014:

Akiko Ando
Chieko Kojima
Eiichi Saito
Eri Uchida
Jun Jidai
Kengo Watanabe
Kenta Nakagome
Kenzo Abe
Koki Miura
Kosuke Urushikubo
Mariko Omi
Masaru Tsuji
Masayuki Sakamoto
Maya Minowa
Mitsuru Ishizuka
Motofumi Yamaguchi
Naoya Iwai
Rai Tateishi
Ryoma Tsurumi
Ryosuke Inada
Shogo Komatsuzaki
Shunichiro Kamiya
Tetsumi Hanaoka
Tomohiro Mitome
Tsuyoshi Maeda
Yoko Fujimoto
Yoshikazu Fujimoto
Yosuke Inoue
Yosuke Kusa
Yosuke Oda
Yuichiro Funabashi
Yuta Sumiyoshi

=== Staff ===
As of December 2013:

Kazuyuki Sato – Otodaiku Managing Director
Makoto Shimazaki – Kodō Cultural Foundation President
Takao Aoki – Kodō Managing Director

Erika Ueda
Jun Akimoto
Junko Susaki
Kazuki Imagai
Kazuko Arai
Kazuyuki Sato
Masafumi Kazama
Minako Goto
Mitsunaga Matsuura
Miwa Saito
Narumi Matsuda
Nobuyuki Nishimura
Satoshi Nakano
Takeshi Arai
Taro Nishita
Tatsuya Dobashi
Toshiaki Negishi
Yasuko Honma
Yoshiaki Oi
Yoshie Abe
Yuko Shingai

== Discography ==
Cover of the Sado e - One Earth Tour Special CD

Date	English	Japanese	Notes
1982	Kodō-1		Release KODO-001 on own label.
1982	Kodō Live In California		Release KODO-002 on own label. Cassette only.
1985	Heartbeat Drummers of Japan		
1986	Kodō Vs Yosuke Yamashita - In Live		
1988	Ubu-Suna	産土 (うぶすな)	
1989	Blessing of the Earth		
1990	Irodori	彩	Gold Disc Award for Japanese classical music
1991	Gathering		
1991	Mono-Prism	モノプリズム	
1992	Kaikii	回帰	
1993	Best of Kodo		
1994	Nasca Fantasy	ナスカ幻想	with Isao Tomita
1995	The Hunted	ハンテッド	Original Motion Picture soundtrack
1995	Kodo Live at the Acropolis	鼓童~アクロポリス・ライブ~	
1996	Ibuki	いぶき	
1998	Against		
1999	Sai-Sō: The Remix Project	再創	
1999	Ibuki Remix	再創~“いぶき”・リミックス・アルバム	
1999	Warabe	童	
1999	tsutsumi	鼓	
2000	Tataku: The Best of Kodo II (1994–1999)		
2001	Mondo Head	モンド・ヘッド	
2002	FIFA 2002 World Cup Official Anthem		
2003	Hero		soundtrack
2004	Sadoe – One Earth Tour Special	佐渡へ~鼓童ワン・アース・ツアー スペシャル~	
2005	prism rhythm		
2011	Akatsuki		
2014	Mystery	神秘	
2021	Kodo Together		

== Filmography ==
- Kodō: Heartbeat Drummers of Japan (dir. Jacques Holender, 1984)

== See also ==
- Gocoo
