= Ondekoza =

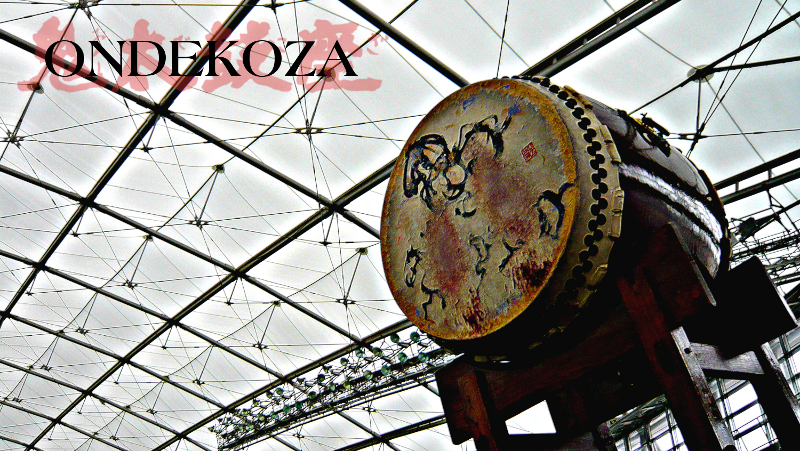
- 350 kg Odaiko drum used by Ondekoza

Background information
- Origin: Fuji, Japan
- Genres: Japanese taiko drums, percussion ensemble
- Years active: 1969–present
- Label: JVC
- Website: ondekoza.com

Ondekoza (鬼太鼓座) ("demon drum group"), sometimes referred to as "Za Ondekoza", is a Japanese troupe specializing in taiko drumming.

Founded in 1969 by Den Tagayasu, in Sado Island, Japan. Ondekoza was influential in the rise of the kumi-daiko (group taiko) style of taiko. Not a taiko player himself, Tagayasu helped transform taiko from a festival-based music form to a virtuosic performance art performed on stage. Ondekoza's performances in North America in 1975 was the first exposure for many and helped spread interest in taiko through North America. The now widely recognized style of wearing only a 'shimekomi' ('fundoshi loincloth) was originally started by Ondekoza when Pierre Cardin suggested that the physique of the drummer be exposed. The traditional Japanese drummers do not play only in underwear.

Part of a larger movement to rediscover Japanese folk art, Tagayasu brought together a group of young men and women to Sado Island to study and live. Largely without formal musical training, the original members lived communally in an old school house while studying taiko, shamisen, koto, minyo (folk music), and traditional dance. The lifestyle was austere and rigorous with most days beginning with a run before breakfast and filled with study and practice.

One of the keys to the group's success was the arrangement of traditional melodies and styles into stylized, artistic musical pieces. Examples of these are their songs yatai-bayashi, based on the Chichibu festival and hachijo and miyake based on the drum patterns from Hachijo Island and Miyake Island. Also groundbreaking was the Odaiko (Large Drum) solo, a musical piece focused largely on one performer with only minimal background drumming, percussion and the addition of Shakuhachi in the introduction making it a unique dialogue between flute and drum. Den Tagayasu and Ondekoza's arrangements of these pieces, and their associated playing styles, have been popularized by their widespread use by other taiko groups throughout Japan and the United States.

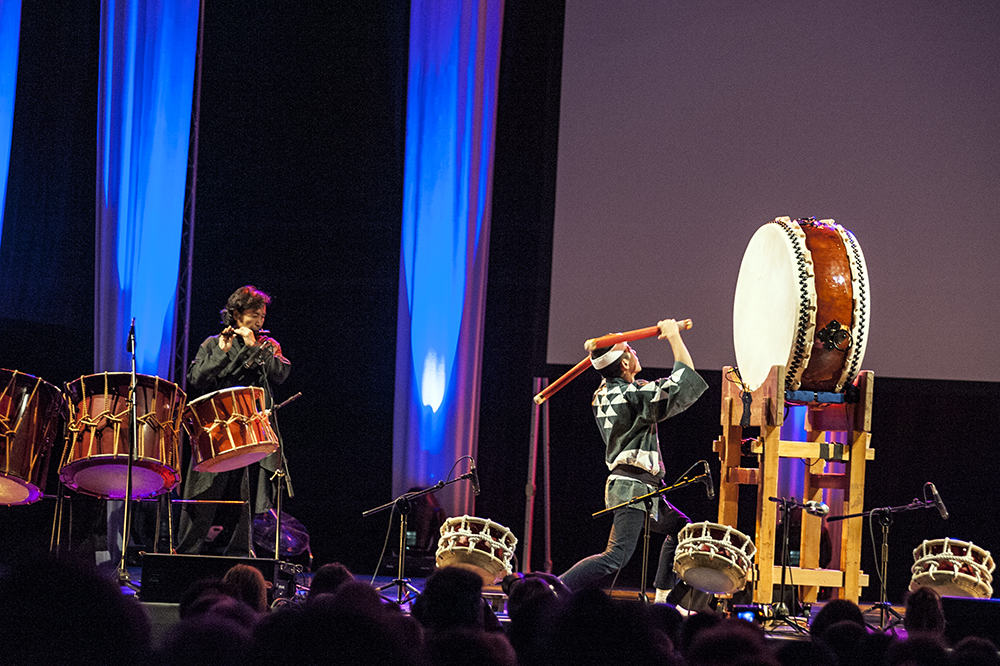
Japanese drum ensemble Ondekoza on stage in Warszawa, Poland in September 2012.

== History ==
In 1975, Ondekoza made their American debut. In one noteworthy performance, the members performed a full set at the finish line of the marathon after completing the Boston Marathon. The group toured America, Europe and Japan to critical acclaim.

In 1981, largely in response to the difference of opinion between Tagayasu and some Ondekoza members, Tagayasu and members broke off. Tagayasu left Sado island and kept the name Ondekoza and most of the drums. Some of Ondekoza members (except Tagayasu) formed the group Kodō on Sado island. bringing in outsider help to form the group Kodo.

Tagayasu gathered new members and formed Ondekoza again in Ikusaka Nagano prefecture, Japan in 1980. In 1981/82, they moved to Unzen in Nagazaki Prefecture where they stayed until 1988. In 1986 the new members of Ondekoza performed at the 1986 World's Fair in Vancouver, British Columbia, Canada and extensively toured in Europe and the United States. They moved to Atami in Shizuoka prefecture in 1988. The group performed at the New Fujiya Hotel Reiho theater twice a night for a whole year. Ichiro Inoue, Yasuko Takakubo, Marco Lienhard, Shigeru Yamamoto and Maceo Hernandez were the lead performers. Marco Lienhard played the Odaiko solo as well as other Taiko parts and Shakuhachi solos. He became one of the lead member that helped the group with their next big Marathon tour in the USA.

The group spent 3 years (1990–1993) running and performing around the United States, beginning and ending their journey with performances at the New York City marathon and performances at Carnegie Hall in New York. At the end of the journey the members had run approximately 10,000 miles (roughly 16,000 kilometers). The members would run 20–30 miles a day and perform along the way. Going from NYC to Florida, New Orleans, San Diego, Seattle, Chicago and back to New York. 13 members started the run and 7 finished and completed the run including Marco Lienhard, Shigeru Yamamoto, Kohei and Ryouhei Inoue, Shigeru Uemura, Yutoku Asato and Akio. the group went back to Japan and on tour with Japan Arts for a couple of years.

Similarly, in 1998, the group began a marathon tour of China, performing in various cities throughout the country while running a distance of 12,500 km. The leader Tagaysu Den died shortly after it in April 2001, in an automobile accident, and the Chinese tour was never completed. The leadership then changed radically and the philosophy of the group changed, never to be the same again. The group has since been headed by shakuhachi (bamboo end-blown flute) artist, Seizan Matsuda. Most of the early members left the group and Ondekoza kept on with new directions and members since.

The new version of Ondekoza has kept some of the running and in 2005 marked the completion of their "Taiwan Marathon Tour", in which they ran the outer border of Taiwan, again while performing at various venues along the way.

Through 2006–2008, the group toured and performed mainly throughout Japan, Asia and Europe.

The group continues to tour internationally, including performances in Africa and the Middle East in 2010.

== Music & Rhythms project ==
"Music & Rhythms" is the title of a musical outreach project launched by Ondekoza in 2005. The project is aimed at children and their communities, and involves workshops in which participants build musical instruments out of bamboo and other items occurring in nature.

The project is typically carried out in a number of steps, from instrument building, to musical experimentation, and eventually to a collaborative performance involving Ondekoza and other musicians of varying world genres. The project aims to promote the development of expressive ability amongst children through the use of construction, creativity, music and dance.

Music & Rhythms was originally launched in Korea in 2005, and has since involved children and communities in various locations around the globe including Africa, the Middle East, Europe and Japan.

== Ondekoza members ==
Members of Ondekoza reside together in what was an abandoned/closed elementary school, in the rural setting of Higashi Chichibu-mura, in Saitama, Japan. Based on Den Tagayasu's principle of "running and drumming as one", running is a central part of the lifestyle of Ondekoza members. As a means of physical and mental training, members run about 10 km (6.2 mi) every day, at 6:00 a.m. before breakfast. Since the founding years of the group, Ondekoza members have competed in various marathons in Japan and the United States.

Their communal lifestyle leaves for little free time and often involves periods of concentration by writing sutra (Buddhist scriptures). The goal in the sutra writing is to fully focus and write as beautifully as possible, preferably using your non-dominant hand. Hiro Yoshi, Director of Ondekoza and member for over 20 years, said "I want to see a performance that comes from amazing effort, a performance so serious and real that the performer plays as if their life depends on it."

As of end of 2019, only three members lived in their facilities while five to six members were spread throughout Japan, some of whom only join the group for performances.

Applicants who wish to join the group must complete a trial year, paying a monthly stipulation to cover their board and living costs. Those that complete the year successfully are paid a salary in accordance with their ability, with all funds coming from Ondekoza's performances.

== Discography ==
=== Albums ===
| Year | Album title | Notes |
|---|---|---|
| 1977 | Ondekoza | |
| 1986 | Ondekoza Live | |
| 1987 | Ondekoza New | |
| 1990 | Kagura | |
| 1994 | Ondekoza I | Second Release |
| 1995 | Ondekoza II | Second Release |
| 1994 (1986) | Tatake Gendai-no-Ibuki/Ondekoza III | Second Release |
| 1990 | BEST ONE | Greatest Hits Compilation |
| 1993 | Ondekoza NEW | |
| 1993 | Ondekoza | Special Edition |
| 1994 | Ondekoza Legend | |
| 1994 | Shisso | "Sprint" |
| 1995 | Sentaifu TYPHOON | |
| 1995 | Ondekoza TWIN BEST | Greatest Hits Compilation |
| 1997 | Fugaku-Hyakkei | "Fuji Yama" |
| 1999 | Doto Banri | |
| 2001 | N-Kyo Densetsu-no Live | "N-Kyo Legendary Live" |
| 2004 | Kyoten-Dochi | |
| 2005 | COLEZO! Ondekoza Best | Greatest Hits Compilation |
| 2005 | COLEZO!TWIN Ondekoza | Greatest Hits Compilation |

=== DVDs ===
| Year | DVD title | Notes |
|---|---|---|
| 2006 | Fugaku Hyakkei | "Fuji Yama" |
| 1995 | Ondekoza Live '95 | |

== See also ==
- Gocoo—A seven female and three male taiko drumming band from Tokyo
- Kodō (taiko group)—A professional taiko drumming group formed from former members of Ondekoza
