= Martha and the Vandellas discography =

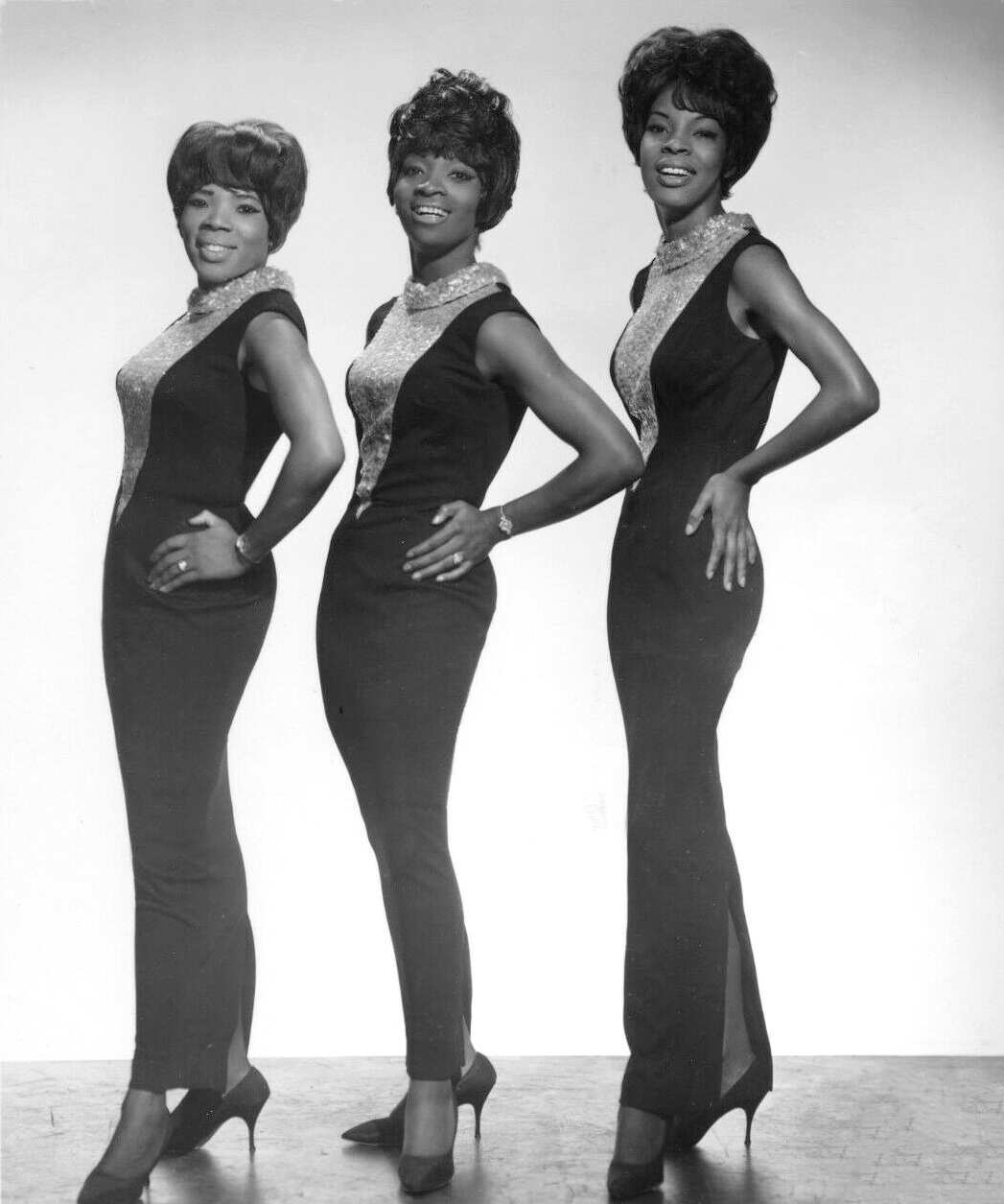
- Studio albums: 8
- Live albums: 1
- Compilation albums: 1
- Singles: 29

This is a listing of the albums and singles released by Motown group Martha and the Vandellas. Twelve of the group's singles reached the Billboard Top 40 singles chart in the US while 21 singles registered on the Top 40 of the US R&B chart, 2 of which went to #1 on the chart. Six of the singles were Top 10 US hits, while ten were Top 10 US R&B hits. Of all the songs they released, 23 of their singles were US Hot 100 hits with 24 registering on the US R&B singles chart. The group also scored seven UK Top 40 hits and ten Canadian Top 40 hits.

== Albums ==
Title	Album details	Peak chart positions	
Title	Album details	US	US R&B
Come and Get These Memories	Released: June 28, 1963; Label: Gordy	—	—N/a
Heat Wave	Released: September 30, 1963; Label: Gordy	125	—N/a
Dance Party	Released: April 12, 1965; Label: Gordy	139	—
Watchout!	Released: November 16, 1966; Label: Gordy	116	—
Ridin' High	Released: April 29, 1968; Label: Gordy	167	13
Sugar 'n' Spice	Released: September 16, 1969; Label: Gordy	—	—
Natural Resources	Released: September 8, 1970; Label: Gordy	—	—
Black Magic	Released: March 3, 1972; Label: Gordy	146	30
"—" denotes releases that did not chart.

=== Compilation albums ===
Title	Album details	Peak chart positions	
Title	Album details	US	US R&B
Greatest Hits	Released: May 4, 1966; Label: Gordy	50	6

=== Live albums ===
Title	Album details	Peak chart positions	
Title	Album details	US	US R&B
Martha and the Vandellas Live!	Released: September 1967; Label: Gordy	140	—

== Singles ==
Title	Year	Peak chart positions						Certifications	Album
Title	Year	US	US R&B	CAN	BEL (WA)	GER	UK	Certifications	Album
"I'll Let You Know" / "It Takes Two" (released as the Del-Phis)	1961	—	—	—	—	—	—		Non-album singles
"You'll Never Cherish a Love So True" (released as the Vells)	1962	—	—	—	—	—	—		Non-album singles
"I'll Have to Let Him Go"	1962	—	—	—	—	—	—		Come and Get These Memories
"Come and Get These Memories"	1963	29	6	—	—	—	—		Come and Get These Memories
"Heat Wave"	1963	4	1	—	—	—	—	BPI: Silver	Heat Wave
"Quicksand"	1963	8	7	—	—	—	—		Non-album singles
"Live Wire"	1964	42	11	—	—	—	—		Non-album singles
"In My Lonely Room"	1964	44	6	—	—	—	—		Non-album singles
"Dancing in the Street"	1964	2	8	3	—	36	4	RIAA: Gold; BPI: Platinum	Dance Party
"Wild One"	1964	34	11	33	—	—	—		Dance Party
"Nowhere to Run"	1965	8	5	22	—	—	26	BPI: Gold	Dance Party
"You've Been in Love Too Long"	1965	36	25	24	—	—	—		Non-album singles
"My Baby Loves Me"	1966	22	3	33	—	—	—		Non-album singles
"What Am I Going to Do Without Your Love"	1966	71	—	—	—	—	—		Watchout!
"I'm Ready for Love"	1966	9	2	5	—	—	22		Watchout!
"Jimmy Mack"	1967	10	1	5	48	—	21	BPI: Silver	Watchout!
"Love Bug Leave My Heart Alone"	1967	25	14	17	—	—	—		Ridin' High
"Honey Chile"	1967	11	5	20	—	—	30		Ridin' High
"I Promise to Wait My Love"	1968	62	36	30	—	—	—		Ridin' High
"Forget Me Not"	1968	93	—	—	—	—	11		Ridin' High
"I Can't Dance to That Music You're Playing"	1968	42	24	42	—	—	—		Non-album singles
"Sweet Darlin'"	1968	80	45	73	—	—	—		Non-album singles
"(We've Got) Honey Love"	1969	56	27	43	—	—	—		Ridin' High
"Taking My Love (And Leaving Me)"	1969	—	44	77	—	—	—		Sugar 'n' Spice
"I Gotta Let You Go"	1970	93	43	—	—	—	—		Non-album single
"Bless You"	1971	53	29	—	—	—	33		Black Magic
"In and Out of My Life"	1971	—	22	—	—	—	—		Black Magic
"Tear It On Down"	1972	—	37	—	—	—	—		Black Magic
"No One There"	1973	—	—	—	—	—	—		Black Magic
"Baby Don't Leave Me"	1973	—	—	—	—	—	—		Non-album single
"—" denotes releases that did not chart or were not released in that territory.

== Other charted songs ==
Title	Year	Peak chart positions		Album
Title	Year	US	US R&B	Album
"Love (Makes Me Do Foolish Things)"	1965	70	22	"You've Been in Love Too Long" B-side
