= Martha and the Vandellas Live! =

Live album by Martha and the Vandellas
- Released: September 1967
- Recorded: 1967
- Venue: 20 - Grand, Detroit, Michigan
- Genre: Soul
- Length: 43:51
- Label: Gordy

Martha and the Vandellas chronology
Watchout! (1966)	Martha and the Vandellas Live! (1967)	Ridin' High (1968)

Martha and the Vandellas Live! is a 1967 live album by Motown girl group Martha and the Vandellas, recorded live at Detroit's Twenty Grand Club, and released on the Gordy label. Among their legion of hits including "Heat Wave", "Jimmy Mack", "Nowhere to Run", "Love (Makes Me Do Foolish Things)" and "Dancing in the Street", the group also covered a bit of Aretha Franklin in the medley of "Do Right Woman, Do Right Man" and "Respect" and The Temptations' version of the standard "For Once in My Life".

When it was announced that the group was going to appear at 20 Grand for three nights of recording, public response was so overwhelming that the management of the club was unable to handle reservations.

The album was the group's last release under the Martha and the Vandellas moniker as, not too long afterwards, they released their first single, "Honey Chile", under the name of Martha Reeves & The Vandellas. It reached number 140 on the Billboard 200, staying there for five weeks.

== Track listing ==
Side one
No.	Title	Writer(s)	Length
1.	"Introduction"		0:05
2.	"I'm Ready for Love"	Holland–Dozier–Holland	2:35
3.	"Love Bug Leave My Heart Alone"	Richard Morris; Sylvia Moy	2:40
4.	"For Once in My Life"	Ron Miller; Orlando Murden	4:20
5.	"Love Is Like a Heat Wave"	Holland–Dozier–Holland	2:15
6.	"Nowhere to Run"	Holland–Dozier–Holland	2:25
7.	"My Baby Loves Me"	William "Mickey" Stevenson; Ivy Jo Hunter; Moy	5:35

Side two
No.	Title	Writer(s)	Length
1.	"I Found a Love"	Wilson Pickett; Willie Schofield; Bobby West	2:42
2.	"Jimmy Mack"	Holland–Dozier–Holland	3:52
3.	"You've Been in Love Too Long"	Stevenson; Hunter; Clarence Paul	3:00
4.	"Love (Makes Me Do Foolish Things)"	Holland–Dozier–Holland	3:12
5.	"Do Right Woman / Respect"	Chips Moman; Dan Penn; / Otis Redding	2:58
6.	"Medley: Dancing in the Street / I Can't Help Myself (Sugar Pie Honey Bunch) / Sweet Soul Music / Uptight (Everything's Alright)"	Marvin Gaye; Stevenson; Hunter; / Holland–Dozier–Holland /: Sam Cooke; Arthur Conley; Redding; /: Stevie Wonder; Moy; Henry Cosby	8:12

== Personnel ==
- Martha Reeves – lead vocals
- Rosalind Ashford – background vocals
- Betty Kelly – background vocals
- Dave Van DePitte – arranger, conductor
- Earl Van Dyke – keyboards
