= Sugar 'n' Spice (Martha Reeves and the Vandellas album) =

Studio album by Martha and the Vandellas
- Released: September 16, 1969
- Recorded: 1966–1969
- Studio: Hitsville U.S.A. (Studio A)
- Genre: Soul, R&B
- Length: 33:42
- Label: Gordy
- Producer: George Gordy

Martha and the Vandellas chronology
Ridin' High (1968)	Sugar 'n' Spice (1969)	Natural Resources (1970)

Singles from Sugar 'n' Spice
- 1. "Taking My Love (And Leaving Me) / Heartless" Released: August 14, 1969

Professional ratings
Review scores
Source	Rating
Allmusic	3/5 stars

Sugar 'n' Spice is a 1969 soul album released by Motown girl group Martha and the Vandellas on the Gordy (Motown) label. The album was released during a troubling and downward time for the lead singer, Martha Reeves, who was now heavily addicted to painkillers and alcohol and had recently returned from being put into a psychiatric ward earlier in the year after Reeves had a breakdown from taking an acid-spiked drink during a party. Like many Motown albums of the late sixties, the album was produced by several in-house producers including Ashford & Simpson, Frank Wilson and Deke Richards. Two tracks were in the can from Holland–Dozier–Holland ("I Can't Get Along Without You", and "I Hope You Had Better Luck Than I Did"). The modest R&B hit (#44), "Taking My Love (And Leaving Me)" is featured on this album. Although new member and former Velvelettes member Sandra Tilley is featured on the album cover, her vocals do not appear on the album. Instead, tracks were used with Rosalind Ashford, Lois Reeves with additional vocals accompanied by The Andantes and Syreeta Wright. The album was their first in six years to not reach the Billboard 200 due to low promotion and the lack of a hit single.

== Track listing ==
Side one
No.	Title	Writer(s)	Length
1.	"Taking My Love (And Leaving Me)"	George Gordy; Allen Story	2:47
2.	"Shoe Leather Expressway"	Frank Wilson; Sylvia Moy	2:47
3.	"You're the Loser Now"	Clay McMurray	3:15
4.	"I'm a Winner"	Nickolas Ashford; Valerie Simpson	2:42
5.	"What Now My Love"	Gilbert Bécaud; Pierre Delanoë; Carl Sigman	2:59
6.	"Soul Appeal"	Raynard Miner	2:25

Side two
No.	Title	Writer(s)	Length
1.	"Loneliness Is a Lonely Feelin'"	Deke Richards; Debbie Dean	2:24
2.	"I Love the Man"	Miner; Janie Bradford	2:38
3.	"It Ain't Like That"	Ashford; Simpson	2:55
4.	"I Can't Get Along Without You"	Holland–Dozier–Holland; Barrett Strong	2:59
5.	"Heartless"	Ivy Jo Hunter	2:57
6.	"I Hope That You Have Better Luck Than I Did"	Holland–Dozier–Holland	2:54

== Personnel ==
- Martha Reeves - lead vocals
- Rosalind Ashford - backing vocals (side 2, tracks 1 and 6)
- Lois Reeves - backing vocals (side 2, tracks 1 and 6)
- The Andantes - backing vocals (side 1, tracks 1–3, 5–6; side 2, tracks 2, 4–6)
- Syreeta Wright - backing vocals (side 1, track 1)
- Valerie Simpson - backing vocals (side 1, track 4; side 2, track 3)
- Nickolas Ashford - backing vocals (side 1, track 4; side 2, track 3)
- The Funk Brothers - instrumentation
