= Ridin' High (Martha and the Vandellas album) =

Studio album by Martha Reeves and the Vandellas
- Released: April 29, 1968
- Recorded: 1967–1968
- Studio: Hitsville U.S.A. (Studio A)
- Genre: Soul, psychedelic soul, R&B, pop-soul
- Length: 31:21
- Label: Gordy
- Producer: Richard Morris

Martha Reeves and the Vandellas chronology
Martha and the Vandellas Live! (1967)	Ridin' High (1968)	Sugar 'n' Spice (1969)

Singles from Ridin' High
- 1. "Love Bug Leave My Heart Alone / One Way Out" Released: August 3, 1967; 2. "Honey Chile / Show Me the Way" Released: October 31, 1967; 3. "I Promise to Wait My Love / Forget Me Not" Released: April 4, 1968; 4. "(We've Got) Honey Love / I'm in Love (And I Know It)" Released: March 20, 1969

Professional ratings
Review scores
Source	Rating
Allmusic	3/5 stars

"Ridin' High" is a 1968 album released by Motown girl group Martha and the Vandellas on the Gordy (Motown) label. This album featured the last Top 40 pop hits scored by the group during their recording tenure, "Love Bug Leave My Heart Alone" and "Honey Chile". It was a series of firsts for the group: it was the first album without the help of since departed producers William "Mickey" Stevenson and Holland–Dozier–Holland, however, Motown included one HDH track on the album, "Leave It In The Hands Of Love." Also on Ridin' High is a cover version of Dionne Warwick's then recent hit "I Say a Little Prayer."

Bringing in Richard Morris and songwriter Sylvia Moy, the group managed to release two hit singles though this was the beginning of the end for the group as hitmakers on the pop charts. Like their label mates The Supremes and the Four Tops, they stalled without the team of Holland-Dozier-Holland, although they continued to chart well on the R&B charts and in England until their 1973 disbanding.

The original photo shoot for the cover of the album featured Martha Reeves, Rosalind Ashford, and Betty Kelly, however Kelly was replaced by Reeves sister Lois Reeves before the album was released and Lois was ultimately featured. Lois Reeves's photos were cropped over Betty Kelly's so as not to take all new photos, This is also the first album where they were credited as Martha Reeves and the Vandellas. Additionally, it is also the last album to feature original member Rosalind Ashford, who would exit out of the group shortly a year after this album came out.

The album became the group's penultimate album to chart on the Billboard 200, reaching number 167 on June 1, 1968, their lowest charting album to date, staying there for eight weeks.

== Track listing ==
Side one
No.	Title	Writer(s)	Length
1.	"I Promise to Wait My Love"	Billie-Jean Brown; George Gordy; Margaret Johnson Gordy; Allen Story	2:05
2.	"Honey Chile"	Sylvia Moy; Richard Morris	2:55
3.	"(There's) Always Something There to Remind Me"	Burt Bacharach; Hal David	3:00
4.	"Leave It in the Hands of Love"	Holland–Dozier–Holland; Debbie Dean	2:37
5.	"Love Bug Leave My Heart Alone"	Morris; Moy	2:06
6.	"I'm in Love (And I Know It)"	Henry Cosby; Dean; Stevie Wonder; William Weatherspoon	2:37

Side two
No.	Title	Writer(s)	Length
1.	"To Sir, with Love"	Don Black; Mark London	2:53
2.	"Forget Me Not"	Morris; Moy	2:55
3.	"(We've Got) Honey Love"	Morris; Moy	2:27
4.	"I Say a Little Prayer"	Bacharach; David	2:59
5.	"Without You"	Dean; Deke Richards	2:09
6.	"Show Me the Way"	J. J. Barnes; Morris; Moy	2:38

== Personnel ==
- Martha Reeves - lead vocals
- Rosalind Ashford - backing vocals (side 1, tracks 1, 2, and 5; side 2, track 6)
- Lois Reeves - backing vocals (side 1, tracks 1 and 2; side 2, track 6)
- Betty Kelly - backing vocals (side 1, track 5)
- The Andantes - backing vocals (side 1, tracks 3, 4, and 6; side 2, tracks 1–5)
- The Funk Brothers - instrumentation
