= Greatest Hits (Martha and the Vandellas album) =

Greatest hits album by Martha and the Vandellas
- Released: May 4, 1966
- Studio: Hitsville U.S.A., Detroit
- Length: 33:29
- Label: Gordy
- Producer: William "Mickey" Stevenson; Holland–Dozier–Holland

Martha and the Vandellas chronology
Dance Party (1965)	Greatest Hits (1966)	Watchout! (1966)

Singles from Greatest Hits
- 1. "Quicksand / Darling, I Hum Our Song" Released: November 4, 1963; 2. "Live Wire / Old Love (Let's Try Again)" Released: January 17, 1964; 3. "In My Lonely Room / A Tear for the Girl" Released: March 23, 1964; 4. "You've Been in Love Too Long / Love (Makes Me Do Foolish Things)" Released: July 26, 1965; 5. "My Baby Loves Me / Never Leave Your Baby's Side" Released: January 4, 1966

Professional ratings
Review scores
Source	Rating
Allmusic	4.5/5 stars

Greatest Hits is a greatest hits album by Martha and the Vandellas, released by the Motown's Gordy label in 1966. Included are popular Vandellas hits such as "Dancing in the Street", "Come and Get These Memories", "Heat Wave", "Live Wire", "Wild One", "Nowhere to Run", and "Quicksand" and featured non-album singles "You've Been in Love Too Long", "Love (Makes Me Do Foolish Things)" and "In My Lonely Room"

A new track, "My Baby Loves Me" features The Andantes and the Four Tops on background vocals. "My Baby Loves Me" was a Top 40 Billboard Hot 100 single in 1966, as well as a Top 5 Billboard R&B Singles chart hit. The album became the group's highest charting album, reaching number 50 on June 11, 1966, staying on the chart for 15 weeks.

== Track listing ==
Side one
No.	Title	Writer(s)	Length
1.	"My Baby Loves Me"	William "Mickey" Stevenson; Ivy Jo Hunter; Sylvia Moy	3:08
2.	"Come and Get These Memories"	Holland–Dozier–Holland	2:23
3.	"Love Is Like a Heat Wave"	Holland–Dozier–Holland	2:45
4.	"Dancing in the Street"	Marvin Gaye; Stevenson; Hunter	2:40
5.	"Quicksand"	Holland–Dozier–Holland	2:36
6.	"Live Wire"	Holland–Dozier–Holland	2:38

Side two
No.	Title	Writer(s)	Length
1.	"You've Been in Love Too Long"	Stevenson; Hunter; Clarence Paul	3:00
2.	"In My Lonely Room"	Holland–Dozier–Holland	3:21
3.	"Love (Makes Me Do Foolish Things)"	Holland–Dozier–Holland	2:54
4.	"A Love Like Yours (Don't Come Knocking Everyday)"	Holland–Dozier–Holland	2:29
5.	"Nowhere to Run"	Holland–Dozier–Holland	2:51
6.	"Wild One"	Stevenson; Hunter	2:44
