= (We've Got) Honey Love =

""(We've Got) Honey Love""

Single by Martha Reeves and the Vandellas

from the album Riding High
- B-side: "I'm in Love (And I Know It)"
- Released: March 20, 1969
- Recorded: Hitsville USA; 1968
- Genre: R&B
- Label: Gordy
- Songwriter(s): Richard Morris; Sylvia Moy
- Producer(s): Richard Morris

Martha Reeves and the Vandellas singles chronology
"Sweet Darlin'" (1968)	""(We've Got) Honey Love"" (1969)	"Taking My Love (And Leaving Me)" (1969)

"(We've Got) Honey Love" is a 1967 song by Motown girl group The Velvelettes that later became a 1969 single released by another Motown girl group Martha and the Vandellas (credited here as Martha Reeves & the Vandellas) from their album Ridin' High released in 1968. The song returned the Vandellas to the top forty of Billboard's R&B singles chart where it peaked at number twenty-seven while it hit the Billboard Hot 100 peaking at number fifty-seven. It was the group's sixth record where they were listed as Martha Reeves and the Vandellas following the successful "Honey Chile" single two years earlier. The song talked of how one woman's lover's charm was like "sugar and spice" adding names of candy and soda adding "a little bit of me, a little bit of you and we've got honey love." The Velvelettes, meanwhile, had recorded two versions of the song (one led by the group's lead singer, Carolyn 'Cal' Gill, the other is a rare lead for then group member - and future Vandella - Sandra Tilley), both of which would go unreleased for almost 40 years. All three versions were written by Richard Morris and Sylvia Moy, and produced by Morris (with Moy co-producing the versions by The Velvelettes). Every version also used the same track with The Andantes as background vocals.

== Personnel ==
- Lead vocals by Martha Reeves
- Backing vocals by The Andantes: Marlene Barrow, Jackie Hicks and Louvain Demps
- Instrumentation by The Funk Brothers
