= These Things Will Keep Me Loving You =

1966 single by The Velvelettes

Single by The Velvelettes
- Released: 25 August 1966
- Recorded: May–July 1966
- Genre: Pop, soul
- Label: Soul (Motown); S 35025; Tamla Motown (UK); TMG 580, TMG 780 (1971 reissue)
- Songwriter(s): Harvey Fuqua, Johnny Bristol, Sylvia Moy
- Producer(s): Johnny Bristol

The Velvelettes singles chronology
"A Bird In The Hand (Is Worth Two In The Bush)" (1965)	"These Things Will Keep Me Loving You" (1966)	"Needle In A Haystack" (1987)

"These Things Will Keep Me Loving You" is a Motown song written by Harvey Fuqua, Johnny Bristol and Sylvia Moy, and recorded, most notably, by The Velvelettes and Diana Ross.

== Details ==
The Velvelettes, a minor act signed to Motown's V.I.P. subsidiary, recorded the first version of the song in May 1966. The group had found some success with their first two (official) Motown singles, "Needle In A Haystack" and "He Was Really Sayin' Somethin'", but their last two releases had failed to chart. Although "These Things Will Keep Me Loving You" was scheduled for release on V.I.P. (V.I.P. 25034), the song was instead released on Motown's Soul imprint (as S 35025), in August 1966. It became a minor R&B hit in America, peaking at number 43 on the US R&B Charts in late 1966. It nearly made it onto the Billboard Hot 100 as well, bubbling under at number 102. A Velvelettes album project was also started, The Velvelettes, and scheduled for release as V.I.P. 401. The LP was scrapped and the group disbanded shortly after. "These Things Will Keep Me Loving You" proved to be their last Motown single. In 1971, however, a British (Tamla Motown) reissue of the song became a hit, making number 34 on the UK Singles Chart in August of that year. Despite the newfound success, The Velvelettes did not reunite until the 1980s; they would go on to record (with all four original members) for Ian Levine's Motorcity Records as well. Their next single was a rerecorded version of their hit "Needle In A Haystack", released on Levine's Nightmare label some 21 years after this song.

Diana Ross, who had been the lead singer of The Supremes, left the group for a solo career in early 1970. She recorded "These Things Will Keep Me Loving You" in January that year for her self-titled debut solo album, Diana Ross. The LP was a success and is widely regarded as some of Ross' finest solo work. Motown singer-songwriters Ashford & Simpson produced all of its tracks, except "These Things", which was produced by Bristol.

Motown musician Junior Walker and his All-Stars also recorded the song in early 1971. That version was included on their Rainbow Funk album, released in July of the same year.

== Personnel ==
=== Velvelettes version ===
- Lead vocals by Carolyn "Cal" Gill
- Background vocals by The Andantes (Louvain Demps, Marlene Barrow and Jackie Hicks)
- Instrumentation by The Funk Brothers

=== Diana Ross version ===
- Lead vocals by Diana Ross
- Background vocals by Merry Clayton, Julia Waters, and Maxine Waters and Johnny Bristol

=== Junior Walker version ===
- Lead vocals and tenor sax solo by Junior Walker
- Background vocals by the Blackberries

== Charts ==
=== Velvelettes version ===
Chart	Peak position
US Billboard Hot 100	102
US R&B Singles	43
UK Singles Chart	34
