= Mickey Stevenson =

American songwriter and record producer for Motown Records (born 1937)

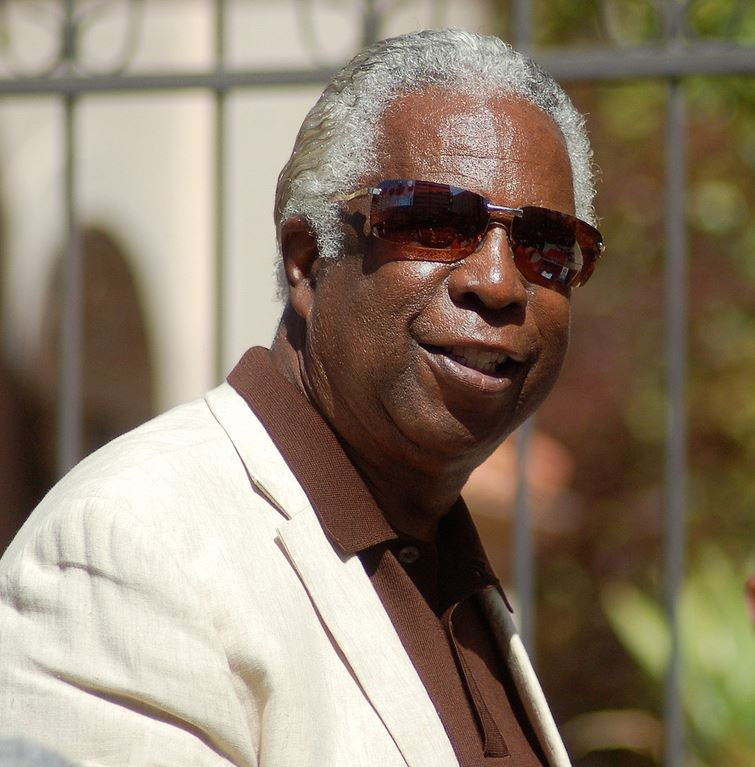
- Stevenson at a ceremony in March 2013 for the Funk Brothers to receive a star on the Hollywood Walk of Fame

Background information
- Also known as: Avery Vandenburg
- Born: January 4, 1937 (age 89); Detroit, Michigan, U.S.
- Occupations: Songwriter; record producer
- Label: Motown

William "Mickey" Stevenson (born January 4, 1937) is an American former songwriter and record producer for the Motown group of labels from the early days of Berry Gordy's company until 1967.

== Life and career ==
He was born William Stevenson and, after spending his formative years recording doowop and gospel music, joined Tamla/Motown in 1959, the year it was founded. He was head of the A&R department there during the company's "glory" years of the mid-1960s when artists such as the Supremes, Marvin Gaye, the Temptations, Four Tops, Stevie Wonder and Martha and the Vandellas came to the fore. Stevenson was also responsible for organizing and establishing the company's in-house studio band, which came to be known as the Funk Brothers.

He wrote and produced many hit records for Motown, some with co-writer and producer Ivy Jo Hunter. They included his biggest successes, "Dancing in the Street", which he co-wrote with Hunter and Marvin Gaye; "It Takes Two" (Gaye and Weston), "Ask the Lonely" for the Four Tops, Jimmy Ruffin's "What Becomes of the Brokenhearted" (produced), "My Baby Loves Me" (Martha and the Vandellas), "Uptight (Everything's Alright)" (produced) for Stevie Wonder and Gaye's first hit, "Stubborn Kind of Fellow". He also wrote "Devil with a Blue Dress" in 1964 with Shorty Long, which became a hit for Mitch Ryder and the Detroit Wheels in 1966…and The Contours 1964 hit, “Can You Jerk Like Me” He also wrote under the pseudonym Avery Vandenburg for Jobete's Stein & Van Stock publishing subsidiary.

In 1969, he founded a label called People Records, which recorded Kim Weston and other acts such as Hodges, James & Smith, but the label dissolved around the time James Brown's unrelated label of the same name was founded in 1971. He was appointed head of Venture Records in 1969, a subsidiary of MGM, with a brief to develop their share of the soul and rhythm and blues market, continuing in this role until the mid-1970s. Subsequently, he owned another California label, Raintree, releasing a single by Willard King in 1975.

In recent years, Stevenson has largely been involved in producing stage musicals. The latter include Swann, Showgirls, Wings and Things, The Gospel Truth, TKO, and Chocolate City. He married Michelle Stevenson on November 11, 2021.

=== Legacy ===
He was referenced in a Smokey Robinson and the Miracles 1963 hit song, "Mickey's Monkey," "A cat named Mickey from out of town" (William "Mickey" Stevenson).

== Chart hits and other notable songs written by William “Mickey” Stevenson ==
Year	Song	Original artist	^{U.S. Pop}	^{U.S. R&B}	^{UK Singles Chart}	Other charting versions, and notes
1961	"Twistin’ Postman"	The Marvelettes	34	13	-	Written by Stevenson (as Stevens), Bateman, and Holland
1961	"Jamie"	Eddie Holland	30	6	-	Written by Stevenson, and Barrett Strong
1962	"Playboy"	The Marvelettes	7	4	-	Written by Stevenson, Bateman, Holland, and Horton
1962	"Beechwood 4-5789"	The Marvelettes	17	7	-	Written by Stevenson, Gaye, and Gordy
1962	"Hitch Hike"	Marvin Gaye	30	12	-	Written by Stevenson, Paul, and Gaye
1963	"Love Me All the Way"	Kim Weston	88	24	-	Written by Stevenson
1963	"Pride and Joy"	Marvin Gaye	10	2	-	Written by Stevenson, Marvin Gaye, and Norman Whitfield
1963	"Dancing in the Street"	Martha and the Vandellas	2	8	4	Written by Stevenson, and Marvin Gaye
1964	"Devil with the Blue Dress"	Shorty Long	-	-	-	Written by Stevenson, and Frederick “Shorty” Long
1964	"What Good Am I Without You"	Marvin Gaye and Kim Weston	61	28	-	Written by Stevenson, and Higdon
1964	"Needle in a Haystack"	The Velvelettes	45	31 (C)	-	Written by Stevenson, and Norman Whitfield
1964	"He Was Really Sayin' Somethin'"	The Velvelettes	64	21	-	Written by Stevenson, Holland, and Norman Whitfield
1964	"What's the Matter with You Baby"	Mary Wells and Marvin Gaye	17	2 (C)	-	Written by Stevenson, and Paul
1965	"My Smile is Just a Frown (Turned Upside Down)"	Carolyn Crawford	-	39	-	Written by Stevenson, Smokey Robinson, and Bradford
1965	"Can You Jerk Like Me"	The Contours	47	15	-	Written by Stevenson, and Hunter
1966	"Nothing’s Too Good For My Baby"	Stevie Wonder	20	4	-	Written by Stevenson, Hank Cosby, and Sylvia Moy
1966	"My Baby Loves Me"	Martha and the Vandellas	22	3	-	Written by Stevenson, Ivy Jo Hunter, and Sylvia Moy
1966	"What am I Going to Do Without Your Love?"	Martha and the Vandellas	71	-	-	Written by Stevenson, and Sylvia Moy
1966	"It Takes Two"	Marvin Gaye and Kim Weston	14	4	16	Written by Stevenson, and Sylvia Moy
1967	"I Got What You Need"	Kim Weston	99	-	-	Written by Stevenson, and Doug Brown
1967	"Stranded in the Middle of Noplace"	The Righteous Brothers	72	-	-	Written by Stevenson
1970	"She Said Yes"	Wilson Pickett	68	20	-	Written by Stevenson, Pickett, Covay, and Nash
1974	"Loving You"	Johnny Nash	91	40	-	Written by Stevenson
1977	"Try and Understand"	Jaisun	-	?	-	Written by Stevenson
