= Forget Me Not (Martha and the Vandellas song) =

Single by Martha and the Vandellas

from the album Riding High
- A-side: "I Promise to Wait My Love"
- Released: April 4, 1968
- Recorded: Hitsville USA; 1967-1968
- Genre: R&B
- Label: Gordy
- Songwriter(s): Richard Morris; Sylvia Moy
- Producer(s): Richard Morris

Martha and the Vandellas singles chronology
"Honey Chile" (1967)	"Forget Me Not" (1968)	"I Can't Dance to That Music You're Playing" (1968)

"Forget Me Not" is a song by Motown girl group Martha and the Vandellas (credited as Martha Reeves & the Vandellas), released as a single in 1968. Though the song failed to ignite charts in America, barely hitting the Billboard Hot 100 where it peaked at No. 93 (it was also the B-side to their hit "I Promise to Wait My Love") and failing to chart on the US R&B charts (a rarity for the group), it became a hit on the UK Singles Chart peaking at No. 11 (in March 1971), netting them their biggest UK hit in several years.

== Credits ==
- Lead vocals by Martha Reeves
- Background vocals by The Andantes: Marlene Barrow, Jackie Hicks and Louvain Demps
- Written by Richard Morris and Sylvia Moy
- Produced by Richard Morris
- Instrumentation by The Funk Brothers
