= Natural Resources =

Studio album by Martha Reeves and the Vandellas
- Released: September 8, 1970
- Recorded: 1969 – 1970
- Genre: Soul
- Length: 33:10
- Label: Gordy
- Producers: Henry Cosby; Clarence Paul

Martha Reeves and the Vandellas chronology
Sugar 'n' Spice (1969)	Natural Resources (1970)	Black Magic (1972)

Singles from Natural Resources
- 1. "I Should Be Proud" Released: February 12, 1970

Professional ratings
Review scores
Source	Rating
Allmusic	3/5 stars

Natural Resources is a 1970 soul album released by Motown girl group Martha Reeves and the Vandellas on the Gordy (Motown) label. The album is significant for the Vietnam War ballad "I Should Be Proud" and the slow jam, "Love Guess Who". The album marked a return from lead singer Martha Reeves, recovering from a time in a mental institution after an addiction to painkillers nearly wrecked her (though it still took her until 1977 to beat her addiction). This was the next-to-last album for the Vandellas, whose success had peaked in the mid-1960s.

== Track listing ==
Side one
No.	Title	Writer(s)	Length
1.	"Something"	George Harrison	2:47
2.	"Easily Persuaded"	Dick Cooper; Clarence Paul; Ernie Shelby; Morris Broadnax	2:44
3.	"Didn't We"	Jimmy Webb	2:41
4.	"I'm in Love"	Ernie Shelby	2:58
5.	"Love, Guess Who"	Clarence Paul; Ernie Shelby	2:54
6.	"Everybody's Talking"	Fred Neil	2:50

Side two
No.	Title	Writer(s)	Length
1.	"Put a Little Love in Your Heart"	Jackie DeShannon; Jimmy Holiday; Randy Myers	2:57
2.	"The Hurt Is Over (Since I've Found You)"	Duke Browner	2:57
3.	"Take a Look"	Clyde Otis	2:16
4.	"Won't It Be So Wonderful"	Nickolas Ashford; Valerie Simpson	2:30
5.	"I Should Be Proud"	Henry Cosby; Joe Hinton; Pam Sawyer	2:56
6.	"People Got to Be Free"	Felix Cavaliere; Ed Brigati	2:40

== Personnel ==
- Martha Reeves - lead vocals; background vocals on "Everybody's Talking"
- The Andantes - background vocals (side 1, tracks 2, 4, 5; side 2, tracks 2, 5 and 6)
- Lois Reeves - backing vocals (side 1, track 1; side 2, track 5)
- Sandra Tilley - background vocals (side 1, track 1; side 2, track 5)
- Valerie Simpson - background vocals (side 2, track 4)
- Nickolas Ashford - background vocals (side 2, track 4)
- The Funk Brothers - instrumentation
