= I Can't Dance to That Music You're Playin' =

1968 single by Martha Reeves and the Vandellas

Single by Martha Reeves and the Vandellas
- B-side: "I Tried"
- Released: July 25, 1968
- Recorded: June 1, 1968, June 3, 1968, June 28, 1968 & July 2, 1968
- Studio: Hitsville USA, Detroit, RCA Victor's Music Center of the World, Hollywood
- Genre: R&B
- Length: 2:38
- Label: Gordy
- Songwriters: Deke Richards; Debbie Dean
- Producer: Deke Richards

Martha Reeves and the Vandellas singles chronology
"I Promise to Wait My Love" (1968)	"I Can't Dance to That Music You're Playin'" (1968)	"Sweet Darlin'" (1968)

"I Can't Dance to That Music You're Playin'" is a 1968 psychedelic soul single by Motown girl group Martha and the Vandellas (credited as Martha Reeves & the Vandellas).

== Background ==
It's notable for featuring background vocals by the Andantes (who had been in a succession of Vandellas singles since "My Baby Loves Me") and Syreeta Wright, who had recently signed to the Motown label and was dating Motown artist Stevie Wonder, at the time. The song talked about how one woman's musician boyfriend leaving her with questions about how he was running off without giving the woman a hint of what he was exactly doing. Reeves would later say that the reason why the chorus was sung by Wright and not by Reeves was because she and the Vandellas had a touring schedule that did not allow her to re-record the chorus, which had been changed with different music. The original recording circulates among collectors, but Reeves can be heard singing the new chorus with Wright and the Andantes in the end of the song, on the mix that was finally released.

== Chart performance ==
The song nearly returned the group to the top 40 on the Billboard singles chart peaking at number 42 and reaching number 24 on the R&B singles chart.

== Credits ==
- Lead vocals by Martha Reeves
- Additional lead vocals by Syreeta Wright (on the chorus)
- Background vocals by the Andantes: Marlene Barrow, Jackie Hicks and Louvain Demps
- Written by Deke Richards & Debbie Dean
- Produced by Deke Richards

== Beatmasters version ==
"Hey DJ/I Can't Dance to That Music You're Playing"

Single by the Beatmasters featuring Betty Boo

from the album Anywayawanna
- A-side: "Ska Train"
- Released: 1989
- Length: 3:13
- Label: Rhythm King
- Songwriters: Paul Carter; Manda Glanfield; Richard Walmsley; Deke Richards; Debbie Dean; Alison Clarkson
- Producer: The Beatmasters

The Beatmasters singles chronology
"Who's in the House" (1989)	"Hey DJ/I Can't Dance to That Music You're Playing" / "Ska Train" (1989)	"Warm Love" (1989)

Betty Boo singles chronology
"Hey DJ/I Can't Dance to That Music You're Playing" / "Ska Train" (1989)	"Doin' the Do" (1990)

British electronic music group the Beatmasters produced a cover of the song with vocals from British singer Betty Boo, titled "Hey DJ/I Can't Dance to That Music You're Playing" (also formatted as "Hey DJ/I Can't Dance (To That Music You're Playing)"). This version contains additional writing from Beatmasters members Paul Carter, Manda Glanfield, and Richard Walmsley, as well as from Boo herself. It was released as the fourth single from the Beatmasters' debut album, Anywayawanna, in 1989, as a double A-side with "Ska Train".

In the United Kingdom, the Beatmasters' version peaked at No. 7 on the UK Singles Chart. It also reached No. 10 in New Zealand, No. 14 in the Netherlands, and No. 17 in Ireland. In the United States, it reached No. 8 on the Billboard Dance Club Play chart and No. 13 on the Billboard 12-inch Singles Sales chart.

=== Charts ===
==== Weekly charts ====
Chart (1989–1991)	Peak position
Australia (ARIA)	88
Belgium (Ultratop 50 Flanders)	35
Europe (Eurochart Hot 100)	25
Ireland (IRMA)	17
Netherlands (Dutch Top 40)	16
Netherlands (Single Top 100)	14
New Zealand (Recorded Music NZ)	10
UK Singles (OCC)	7
US Dance Club Songs (Billboard)	8
US Dance Singles Sales (Billboard)	13
West Germany (GfK)	93

==== Year-end charts ====
Chart (1989)	Position
Netherlands (Single Top 100)	100
UK Singles (OCC)	73
