= Black Magic (Martha Reeves and the Vandellas album) =

Studio album by Martha Reeves & the Vandellas
- Released: March 3, 1972
- Recorded: 1971
- Studios: Hitsville U.S.A. (Studio A, Detroit, Michigan); Hitsville West (Los Angeles)
- Genre: Soul
- Length: 35:53
- Label: Gordy
- Producers: Johnny Bristol; The Corporation; Hank Cosby; Jimmy Roach; Ashford & Simpson; Lawrence Brown & George Gordy

Martha Reeves & the Vandellas chronology
Natural Resources (1970)	Black Magic (1972)	Anthology (1974)

Singles from Black Magic
- 1. "Bless You / Hope I Don't Get My Heart Broke" Released: September 14, 1971; 2. "In and Out of My Life / Your Love Makes It All Worthwhile" Released: December 16, 1971; 3. "Tear It On Down / I Want You Back" Released: May 23, 1972; 4. "No One There / (I've Given You) The Best Years Of My Life" Released: 1973 (UK only)

Professional ratings
Review scores
Source	Rating
Rolling Stone	(mixed)

Professional ratings
Review scores
Source	Rating
Allmusic	2.5/5 stars

Black Magic is a 1972 album released by Martha Reeves and the Vandellas on the Gordy label. It was the last studio album issued by the group after ten years with Motown. The album is significant for featuring the group's biggest hit of the decade with the Jackson 5-like "Bless You". The track returned the Vandellas to chart success briefly in the US reaching number fifty-three pop, number twenty-nine R&B and number thirty-three on the UK pop singles chart. It was also a top twenty hit in Canada reaching number sixteen on the chart, and a top ten single in Puerto Rico, where it reached number two. Two other subsequent singles, "In and Out of My Life" and "Tear It on Down", were the trio's last Billboard charted hits reaching the top 40 on the R&B charts. "No One There" was released in the UK as a solo single for lead singer Martha Reeves. The album was their last to chart on the Billboard 200, reaching number 146 on April 1, 1972, staying for six weeks. The group's breakup was made official in March 1973.

== Track listing ==
Side one
No.	Title	Writer(s)	Length
1.	"No One There"	Johnny Bristol; Jack Goga; Annette Minor; Peter Green	3:32
2.	"Your Love Makes It All Worthwhile"	Berry Gordy; Alphonzo Mizell; Freddie Perren; Deke Richards	3:24
3.	"Something" (previously released on Natural Resources)	George Harrison	2:41
4.	"Benjamin"	Dino Fekaris; Nick Zesses	3:29
5.	"Tear It on Down"	Nickolas Ashford; Valerie Simpson	3:27
6.	"I've Given You the Best Years of My Life"	Dino Fekaris; Nick Zesses; Jack Goga	2:58

Side two
No.	Title	Writer(s)	Length
1.	"Bless You"	Gordy; Mizell; Perren; Richards	2:58
2.	"I Want You Back"	Gordy; Mizell; Perren; Richards	2:50
3.	"In and Out of My Life"	Lawrence Brown	2:56
4.	"Anyone Who Had a Heart"	Burt Bacharach; Hal David	3:57
5.	"Hope I Don't Get My Heart Broke"	Brown; Gordy; Allen Story	3:41

== Personnel ==
- Martha Reeves – lead vocals
- The Andantes – background vocals
- Lois Reeves – background vocals
- Sandra Tilley – background vocals
- Valerie Simpson – background vocals
- Nickolas Ashford – background vocals
- The Blackberries – background vocals
- The Funk Brothers – instrumentation
- Various Los Angeles session musicians – instrumentation
- Album coordination by Harry Balk
- Produced by Johnny Bristol (tracks 1 & 6), The Corporation (tracks 2, 7, 8 & 10), Henry Cosby (track 3), Jimmy Roach (track 4), Ashford & Simpson (track 5), and George Gordy & Lawrence Brown (tracks 9 & 11).
- Art direction by Curtis McNair
- Graphic supervision by Tom Schlesinger
- Photography by Ron Raffaelli
