= Deborah Stevens =

Deb, Debbie, Debra, Deborah Stephens or Stevens (or similar variations) may refer to:

- Debra L. Stephens (born 1965), Chief Justice of the Washington Supreme Court
- Deb Stevens, former member of the New Hampshire House of Representatives
- Debbie Dean (singer), American performer who sometimes used the stage name Debbie Stevens

== See also ==
- Debra Stephenson
