= Watchout! =

Studio album by Martha and the Vandellas
- Released: November 16, 1966
- Studios: Hitsville U.S.A., Detroit
- Length: 32:40
- Label: Gordy (Motown)
- Producers: William "Mickey" Stevenson; Holland–Dozier–Holland; Harvey Fuqua; Smokey Robinson

Martha and the Vandellas chronology
| Greatest Hits (1966) | Watchout! (1966) | Martha and the Vandellas Live! (1967) |

Singles from Watchout!
- 1. "What Am I Gonna Do Without Your Love? / Go Ahead and Laugh" Released: May 19, 1966; 2. "I'm Ready for Love" / "He Doesn't Love Her Anymore" Released: October 6, 1966; 3. "Jimmy Mack" / "Third Finger, Left Hand" Released: February 3, 1967

Professional ratings
Review scores
| Source | Rating |
|---|---|
| AllMusic | 4/5 stars |

Watchout! is the fourth studio album and fifth album overall by Martha and the Vandellas, released on the Gordy (Motown) label in 1966. The album included the top 10 hit singles, "I'm Ready for Love" and "Jimmy Mack" and the ballad single, "What Am I Gonna Do Without Your Love?". This was one of the last albums by the group with songs by Holland–Dozier–Holland who, the following year, left Motown, and with William "Mickey" Stevenson. The album became the group's highest charting studio album at number 116, reaching the peak on January 11, 1967, staying on the charts for eight weeks.

== Track listing ==
Side one
| No. | Title | Writer(s) | Length |
|---|---|---|---|
| 1. | "I'm Ready for Love" | Holland–Dozier–Holland | 2:52 |
| 2. | "One Way Out" | Holland–Dozier–Holland | 2:33 |
| 3. | "Jimmy Mack" | Holland–Dozier–Holland | 2:47 |
| 4. | "Let This Day Be" | Frank Wilson | 2:39 |
| 5. | "Keep It Up" | Smokey Robinson | 3:08 |
| 6. | "Happiness Is Guaranteed" | Ivy Jo Hunter; Helen Lewis; Kay Lewis | 2:18 |

Side two
| No. | Title | Writer(s) | Length |
|---|---|---|---|
| 1. | "I'll Follow You" | Johnny Bristol; Harvey Fuqua | 2:24 |
| 2. | "No More Tearstained Make Up" | Robinson | 2:23 |
| 3. | "Go Ahead and Laugh" | Hunter; William "Mickey" Stevenson | 2:55 |
| 4. | "What Am I Going to Do Without Your Love?" | Sylvia Moy; Stevenson | 3:00 |
| 5. | "Tell Me I'll Never Be Alone" | James Dean; Leon Ware; William Weatherspoon | 2:40 |
| 6. | "He Doesn't Love Her Anymore" | Hunter | 3:01 |

== Personnel ==
- Martha Reeves – lead vocals
- Rosalind Ashford – backing vocals (except on "Let This Day Be")
- Betty Kelly – backing vocals (except "Let This Day Be" and "Jimmy Mack")
- Annette Beard – backing vocals on "Jimmy Mack"
- The Andantes – backing vocals on "Let This Day Be", "Happiness is Guaranteed", and "Go Ahead and Laugh"; additional background vocals on "Jimmy Mack", "I'm Ready for Love", "What Am I Going to Do Without Your Love?", and "Tell Me I'll Never Be Alone"
- The Spinners – backing vocals on "I'll Follow You"
- The Funk Brothers – instrumentation
