= My Baby Loves Me =

"My Baby Loves Me" is the title of two songs:

- "My Baby Loves Me" (Martha and the Vandellas song)
- "My Baby Loves Me (Just the Way That I Am)", recorded by Patricia Conroy and later Martina McBride
