= I Promise to Wait My Love =

Single by Martha Reeves and the Vandellas

from the album Riding High
- B-side: "Forget Me Not"
- Released: April 4, 1968
- Recorded: Hitsville USA; 1967-1968
- Genre: R&B
- Label: Gordy
- Songwriter(s): Billie-Jean Brown; George Gordy; Margaret Johnson Gordy; Allen Story
- Producer(s): Richard Morris; Billie-Jean Brown; Henry Cosby

Martha Reeves and the Vandellas singles chronology
"Honey Chile" (1967)	"I Promise to Wait My Love" (1968)	"I Can't Dance to That Music You're Playing" (1968)

"I Promise to Wait My Love" is a 1968 single recorded by girl group Martha and the Vandellas (credited as Martha Reeves & the Vandellas), released on the Gordy label.

== Background ==
The third release from the group's Ridin' High, it was another single given to them by producer Richard Morris. Produced under a Memphis soul sound similar to soul singer Aretha Franklin, the song has the narrator (lead singer Martha Reeves) promising to wait for her love as he fights in Vietnam, although the song does not overtly reference the war, disguising it as the war being another woman saying that she will love him "even though (he does her) wrong".

== Personnel ==
- Lead vocals by Martha Reeves
- Background vocals by Rosalind Ashford, Lois Reeves and the Andantes
- Produced by Richard Morris
- Instrumentation by The Funk Brothers

== Chart performance ==
"I Promise to Wait My Love" peaked at #62 on the Hot 100. The song also went to #36 on the Hot Rhythm & Blues Singles chart.
