= Richard Morris (songwriter) =

American songwriter

- Born: Richard T. Morris
- Genres: Soul music
- Occupations: Songwriter, record producer

Richard T. Morris is an American songwriter and record producer, best known for his work with Motown Records in the 1960s.

== Career ==
In early 1960 Morris, Janie Bradford and Robert Bateman heard the Primettes audition for Motown Records. Label owner Berry Gordy Jr. declined to sign the group at that time, and Morris approached them with an offer to record them on another label. He wrote and produced their first single "Tears of Sorrow" on Lu-Pine Records. The Primettes signed to Motown in 1961 and became the Supremes, Motown's most commercially successful act.

Morris produced and wrote for acts including Edwin Starr, and Martha & the Vandellas, sometimes collaborating with songwriter Sylvia Moy. His songs were also recorded by the Originals, Smokey Robinson & the Miracles, the Marvelettes, Stevie Wonder and others.

In 1995, Morris sued Berry Gordy Jr. and Motown for unpaid royalties.

== Selective discography ==
=== Singles ===
Year	Title	Artist	Chart	Writers	Producers
1960	"Tears of Sorrow"	The Primettes	-	Richard Morris, Florence Ballard, Diana Ross	'Hom-Rich'
1966	"Stop Her on Sight (S.O.S.)"	Edwin Starr	US No. 48, UK No. 11	Richard Morris, Al Hamilton, Charles Hatcher	Morris, Al Kent (aka Al Hamilton)
1966	"Headline News"	Edwin Starr	US No. 84, UK No. 39	Morris, Hamilton, Hatcher	Morris, Kent (arr. Mike Terry)
1967	"Love Bug Leave My Heart Alone"	Martha & the Vandellas	US No. 25	Sylvia Moy, Richard Morris	Richard Morris
1967	"Honey Chile"	Martha & the Vandellas	US No. 11	Moy, Morris	Richard Morris
1968	"I Promise to Wait My Love"	Martha & the Vandellas	US No. 62	Billie-Jean Brown, George Gordy, Margaret J. Gordy, Allen Story	Richard Morris, Billie-Jean Brown, Henry Cosby
1968	"Sweet Darlin'"	Martha & the Vandellas	US No. 80	Richard Morris	Richard Morris
1969	"(We've Got) Honey Love"	Martha & the Vandellas	US No. 56	Moy, Morris	Richard Morris
1969	"Baby, I'm for Real"	The Originals	US No. 14	Marvin Gaye, Anna Gordy Gaye	Richard Morris, Marvin Gaye
1971	"Forget Me Not"	Martha & the Vandellas	UK No. 11	Moy, Morris	Richard Morris

=== Albums ===
Year	Title	Artist	Chart	Producers
1968	Ridin' High	Martha & the Vandellas	US No. 167	Richard Morris
