= Love (Makes Me Do Foolish Things) =

Single by Martha and the Vandellas

from the album Greatest Hits
- A-side: "You've Been in Love Too Long"
- Released: July 26, 1965
- Recorded: Hitsville U.S.A., April 10, 1964 & May 5, 1965
- Genre: Pop
- Label: Gordy
- Songwriter(s): Holland–Dozier–Holland
- Producer(s): Brian Holland, Lamont Dozier

Martha and the Vandellas singles chronology
"Nowhere to Run" (1965)	"You've Been in Love Too Long" / "Love (Makes Me Do Foolish Things)" (1965)	"My Baby Loves Me" (1966)

"Love (Makes Me Do Foolish Things)" is a 1965 pop ballad by Motown girl group Martha and the Vandellas. A rare ballad for the group, whose forte was reportedly uptempo soul dance numbers including "Dancing in the Street" and "Nowhere to Run", the b-side to the group's single, "You've Been in Love Too Long", although the song only peaked at #70 on the Billboard Hot 100 singles chart and #22 on the Billboard Hot R&B singles chart. Cash Box described it as a "plaintive, slow-shufflin’ heart-throbber with a nostalgic years-back sound."

Other artist recording the song include: Kim Weston (original recording artist on unreleased track), Diana Ross and the Supremes, Thee Midnighters, Slim Smith, Jean Carn, Billy Preston, and Eula Cooper. The Andantes recorded co-backing vocals on all three Motown recordings.

== Personnel ==
- Lead vocals by Martha Reeves
- Background vocals by The Andantes: Jackie Hicks, Marlene Barrow and Louvain Demps
- Produced by Brian Holland and Lamont Dozier
- Written by Brian Holland, Lamont Dozier and Edward Holland, Jr.
- Instrumentation by The Funk Brothers
