= Wild One (Martha and the Vandellas song) =

Single by Martha and the Vandellas

from the album Dance Party
- B-side: "Dancing Slow"
- Released: November 3, 1964
- Recorded: Hitsville U.S.A., Detroit, Michigan, 1964
- Genre: Pop/soul
- Length: 2:43
- Label: Gordy
- Songwriters: William "Mickey" Stevenson and Ivy Jo Hunter
- Producers: William "Mickey" Stevenson and Ivy Jo Hunter

Martha and the Vandellas singles chronology
"Dancing in the Street" (1964)	"Wild One" (1964)	"Nowhere to Run" (1965)

"Wild One" is a dance single by Motown girl group Martha and the Vandellas. Written and produced by William "Mickey" Stevenson and Ivy Jo Hunter (two-thirds of the collaborators behind the group's most celebrated tune, "Dancing in the Street"). The song was another Top 40 triumph for the group as it reached #34 on Billboard's Hot 100 singles chart and #11 on the Hot R&B singles chart. The backing track for 'Wild one' was an alternative version of the backing track to 'Dancing in the Street'.

"Wild One" suffered somewhat in sales as it was released just four months after the monster hit "Dancing In The Street". Many radio stations were still playing that record.

== Background ==
The song, which in lead singer Martha Reeves' description, was a tribute to bikers (released shortly after The Shangri-Las' "Leader of the Pack"), described the narrator's strong love for her "wild one" who is told he's "no good" by the narrator's close circle. The narrator tells her "wild one" to not listen to what others say and continue to "sav(ing his) love for (her)".

Cash Boxsaid that the "storyline concerns a gal who digs a 'victim of circumstance'" and that the song has the "flavor of" the group's recent hit "Dancing in the Streets."

== Personnel ==
- Lead vocals by Martha Reeves
- Background vocals by Rosalind Ashford, Betty Kelly, William "Mickey" Stevenson, and Ivy Jo Hunter
- Written and produced by William "Mickey" Stevenson and Ivy Jo Hunter
- Instrumentation by the Funk Brothers:
  - Benny Benjamin: drums
  - James Jamerson: bass guitar
  - Ivy Jo Hunter: percussion
  - Jack Ashford: tambourine, vibes
  - Robert White: guitar
  - Eddie Willis: guitar
  - Russ Conway: trumpet
  - Herbert Williams: trumpet
  - George Bohanon: trombone
  - Paul Riser: trombone
  - Henry Cosby: tenor saxophone
  - Mike Terry: baritone saxophone

== Chart performance ==
Chart (1964–65)	Peak position
US Billboard Hot 100	34
US Top 50 in R&B Locations (Cash Box)	11
