= Jimmy Mack =

Single by Martha and the Vandellas

from the album Watchout!
- B-side: Third Finger, Left Hand
- Released: February 3, 1967
- Recorded: March 2, 1964
- Studio: Hitsville U.S.A. (Studio A)
- Genre: R&B; pop
- Length: 2:53
- Label: Gordy; G 7058
- Songwriter: Holland–Dozier–Holland
- Producers: Brian Holland; Lamont Dozier

Martha and the Vandellas singles chronology
"I'm Ready for Love" (1966)	"Jimmy Mack" (1967)	"Love Bug Leave My Heart Alone" (1967)

"Jimmy Mack" is a pop/soul song that in 1967 became a hit single by Martha and the Vandellas for Motown's Gordy imprint. Written and produced by Motown's main creative team, Holland–Dozier–Holland, "Jimmy Mack" was the final Top 10 pop hit for the Vandellas in the United States, peaking at No. 10 on the Billboard Hot 100 in 1967 and at No. 1 on the Billboard R&B Singles chart. Billboard named the song No. 82 on their list of 100 Greatest Girl Group Songs of All Time.

== History ==
The song, with a lead vocal by the Vandellas' lead singer Martha Reeves in the 1967 version, is sung from the point of view of a woman who longs for the return of boyfriend "Jimmy Mack". The woman is being courted by another suitor, who she says "talks just as sweet as" her long-gone Jimmy, and she hopes for Jimmy to return before she falls for the other man.

The inspiration for the song came from a 1964 music industry awards dinner, which Lamont Dozier attended. At the ceremony the mother of songwriter Ronnie Mack accepted an award for her son, who had recently died, for his composition "He's So Fine". Under pressure to come up with a hit for Reeves and the Vandellas, Dozier and the team penned this song in part as a tribute to Mack the writer.

"Jimmy Mack" was originally recorded in 1964 when Annette Beard was still a part of the group. The song was shelved because the Motown Quality Control team felt the recording was not suitable for release because it sounded too much like a Supremes song. Like Smokey Robinson & the Miracles' later hit, "The Tears of a Clown", "Jimmy Mack" was pulled from the vault two years later and released as a single in early 1967. By that time, the Vietnam War had become a highly debated issue among the American public. Thus, Reeves' sentiment that her "Jimmy Mack" return took on a different meaning for many listeners, particularly those stationed overseas.

"Jimmy Mack" was a success, peaking at No. 10 on the Billboard Hot 100 and becoming the second and final Vandellas single to top the Billboard R&B chart. "Jimmy Mack" was also a hit in Britain, reaching No. 21. The song had been included on the Vandellas' LP Watchout!, issued a month before the single release. For nearly 40 years, "Jimmy Mack" was presented in either monaural sound or in a mix culled from an alternate take. A true stereo mix of the original single master was not done until 2005, for The Motown Box, then appearing in 2006 on the compilation Martha & the Vandellas: Gold.

== Personnel ==
- Lead vocals by Martha Reeves
- Background vocals by Rosalind Ashford and Annette Beard on album version; Betty Kelly on 45 version
- Additional (harmony) background vocals by The Andantes: Marlene Barrow, Jackie Hicks and Louvain Demps
- Instrumentation by The Funk Brothers

== Certifications ==
Region	Certification	Certified units/sales
United Kingdom (BPI)	Silver	200,000^{‡}
^{‡} Sales+streaming figures based on certification alone.

== Sheena Easton version (1986) ==
The Scottish singer Sheena Easton recorded "Jimmy Mack" for her 1985 album Do You. It was released as a single in early 1986 and reached number 65 on the US Singles Chart in February 1986.

== See also ==
- R&B number-one hits of 1967 (USA)
- List of cover versions of "Jimmy Mack" at SecondHandSongs.com
