= Sandra Tilley =

American singer

- Tilley in 1969

Background information
- Also known as: Sandra Tilley–Miese
- Born: Sandra L. Tilley; May 6, 1945 or 1946; Cleveland, Ohio, U.S.
- Origin: Detroit, Michigan, U.S.
- Died: September 9, 1983 (aged 37) or September 9, 1983 (aged 38) (sources differ) Las Vegas, Nevada, U.S.
- Genres: R&B; Soul
- Occupation: Singer
- Instrument: Vocals
- Years active: 1965–1972
- Labels: Motown; Gordy; V.I.P.

Sandra L. Tilley (May 6, 1945 or 1946 – September 9, 1983) was an American R&B and soul singer, best known for being a member of Motown girl group the Velvelettes and later joining Martha and the Vandellas.

== Early life and career ==
Sandra Tilley was born in Cleveland, Ohio, on May 5, 1946. Both of her parents died when she was an infant. After their death, Tilley was raised by her relatives in Ohio. While attending school in Cleveland, she took music classes and played the violin in her school orchestra.

Tilley would enter into a career in show business not too long after she graduated from high school. She would become a familiar face in the Cleveland music scenes of the 1960s, taking work as a fill in back up singer for The Orlons. Tilley’s talent was noticed by Carolyn Gill of The Velvelettes who was looking for a fill in for her group. She recruited into The Velvelettes in late 1965 by Gill, as a permanent replacement for member Gail Sonders, would retire the group to focus on her family. Tilley would remain in the groups lineup until their final disband in September, 1967.

In 1968, Tilley would later become the final member to join Martha Reeves and The Vandellas replacing former member Rosalind Ashford. She would make her debut with the group during their engagement at the Copacabana in December 1968. The following year, Tilley would be featured on the album cover for the Vandellas 7th studio album “Sugar ‘n’ Spice”. However, many of Ashford vocals were featured on many of the albums track listings and it is unlikely she sang on the album. The first song she was documented to have recorded with the Vandellas was "Something", which appeared originally on the 1970 album Natural Resources. She sang on the chart hit "Bless You", "Your Loves Makes It All Worthwhile" and the album Black Magic before the group splintered altogether following a farewell tour in 1972. Tilley's highlights as a Vandellas member included performing at the Copacabana in New York City with Judy Garland and F. Lee Bailey in the audience.

Tilley also toured the United Kingdom with the group when "Forget Me Not" became a top ten hit in the UK in 1970. Other highlights include appearances she made with the group on various television programs including The Mike Douglas Show and the popular dance show Soul Train.

== Death and legacy ==
Tilley retired from the music industry and got married in July 1972. After marrying, Tilley and her husband both relocated to Texas and settled in the Houston area. Tilley developed a brain tumor around 1979, and surgery was performed at a hospital in Las Vegas, Nevada, in late-1983. Tilley died after having a brain aneurysm on September 9, 1983, at the age of 37 or 38 (sources differ). She was buried in Highland Park Cemetery in Highland Ohio. In 2002, it was reported that no grave marker had been created for Tilley’s final resting place, and she remains in an unmarked grave; however, in recent years her former Vandella bandmate Lois Reeves has made a few efforts to have a marker created. Tilley had no children, and was survived by her husband and grandmother.
