= Quicksand (Martha and the Vandellas song) =

Single by Martha and the Vandellas
- B-side: "Darling, I Hum Our Song"
- Released: November 4, 1963
- Recorded: Hitsville U.S.A. (Studio A); 1963
- Genre: Soul, pop
- Length: 2:38
- Label: Gordy; G7025
- Songwriter(s): Holland–Dozier–Holland
- Producer(s): Brian Holland, Lamont Dozier

Martha and the Vandellas singles chronology
"(Love Is Like a) Heat Wave" (1963)	"Quicksand" (1963)	"Live Wire" (1964)

"Quicksand" is a song recorded by the Motown girl group Martha and the Vandellas. It was written by the songwriting team of Holland-Dozier-Holland and released as a single in November 1963.

== Background ==
"Quicksand" was built around a similar gospel-inspired delivery of the Martha and the Vandellas' breakout hit " Heat Wave", but with a slightly slower tempo and a harder edge. Like "Heat Wave", it features an analogy to a natural phenomenon, with the narrator comparing falling in love to sinking in quicksand. Cash Box said that "it continues the hard-hitting excitement of ['Heat Wave']."

"Quicksand" was Martha and the Vandellas' third single to be written by Holland–Dozier–Holland, who would later write songs for other Motown artists such as The Supremes and the Four Tops.

== Personnel ==
- Lead vocals by Martha Reeves
- Background vocals by Rosalind Ashford and Annette Beard
- Produced by Brian Holland and Lamont Dozier
- Written by Brian Holland, Lamont Dozier and Edward Holland Jr.
- Instrumentation by the Funk Brothers:
  - Benny Benjamin: drums
  - James Jamerson: bass
  - Earl Van Dyke: piano
  - Robert White: guitar
  - Eddie Willis: guitar
  - Jack Ashford: tambourine, vibes
  - Andrew "Mike" Terry: baritone saxophone solo

== Chart performance ==
Released in November 1963 on the Gordy label, the song became another Top Ten hit for Martha & the Vandellas, eventually reaching number eight on the Billboard Hot 100.
