= Lois Reeves =

American singer

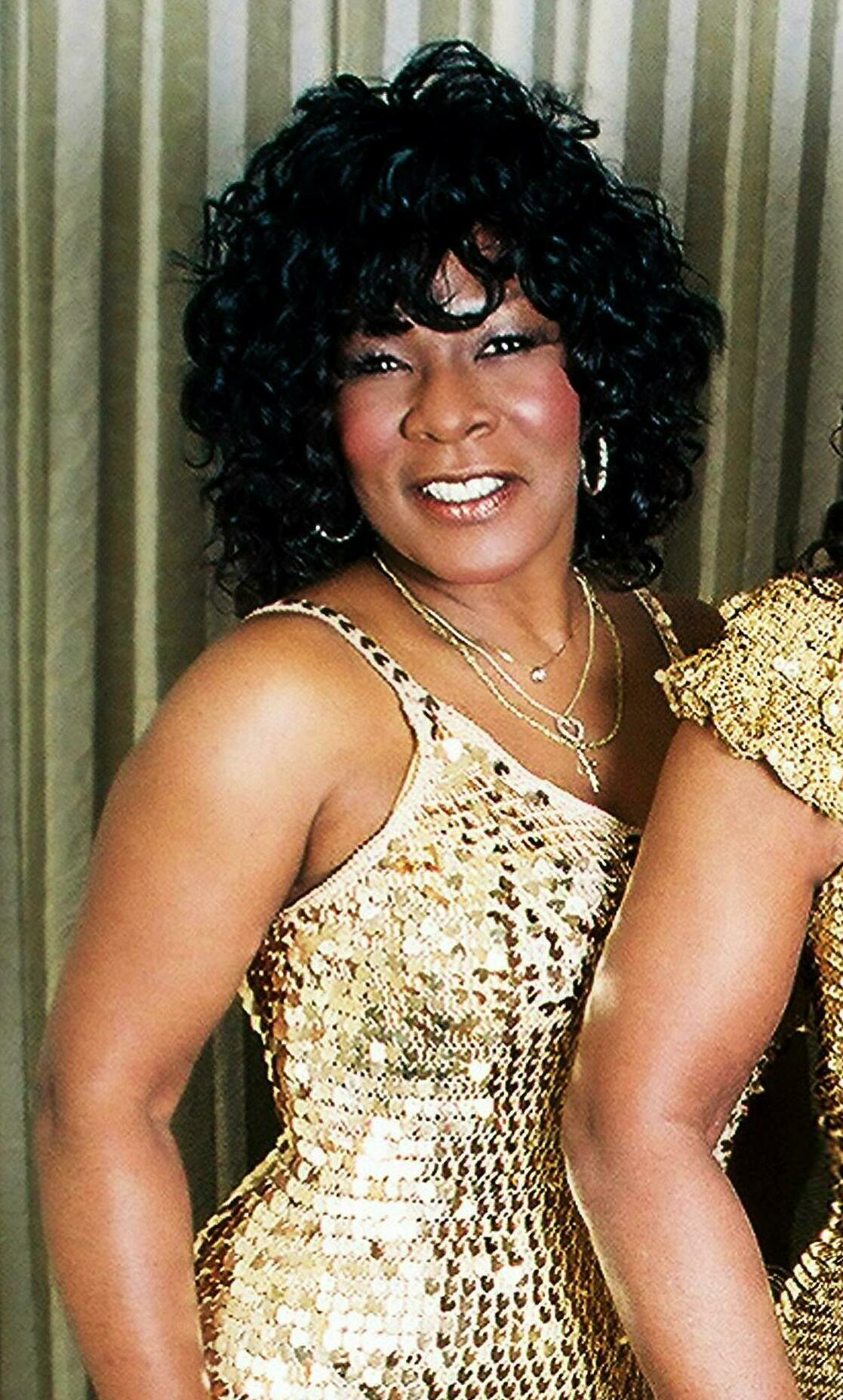
- Reeves in 2004

Background information
- Born: Sandra Delores Reeves; April 12, 1948 (age 78); Detroit, Michigan, U.S.
- Occupation: Singer
- Years active: 1967–present

Sandra Delores Reeves (born April 12, 1948), better known as Lois Reeves, is an American singer. She is most notable for being the younger sister of Motown legend Martha Reeves, who she sang alongside with as a member of Martha and the Vandellas. Reeves joined the group in 1967, replacing singer Betty Kelly. She also sang background vocals for Al Green as a member of the group Quiet Elegance. For her work with the Vandellas, she has been inducted into the Rock & Roll Hall of Fame, the National Rhythm & Blues Hall of Fame, and the Vocal Group Hall of Fame. Her nickname was "Pee Wee" as she is only 5'1" tall.

== Career ==
The daughter of Elijah Joshua Reeves and Ruby Lee Gilmore, Lois was part of a family of 11 children. Before her older sister, Martha, was a year old, the family moved from Eufaula, Alabama to Detroit. Both Elijah and Ruby enjoyed singing and playing the guitar, passing their love of music on to their children. Elijah's father, Reverend Elijah Reeves, was a minister at Detroit's Metropolitan Church; the family was very active in the church and in its choir.

Upon graduation from high school, Lois Reeves began to travel extensively with her older sister, Martha Reeves, and her musical group, the Vandellas. As she watched the shows from the wings almost nightly, she knew the music and routines perfectly. It all happened by surprise for the teenaged Lois. One night she was in the wings; the next night, barely 18 years of age, she was asked by her sister to replace Betty Kelly. The group put Lois' business knowledge to work; she took care of the bookkeeping, hotel reservations, travel arrangements and also helped negotiate contracts.

Though never under contract to Motown Records, she was under contract to Martha Reeves, and later found herself singing on the Vandellas' singles "Love Bug Leave My Heart Alone" and "Honey Chile", the latter of which was when the group was known as Martha Reeves and the Vandellas. Lois was the youngest member of the Vandellas throughout its tenure and performed with the group in Japan, UK and Spain. She also performed with the group when they successfully opened at the renowned Copacabana nightclub in New York. Lois appeared with the group on The Mike Douglas Show in 1968 and Soul Train in 1971.

Lois and original Vandellas member Rosalind Ashford often had to share background work with The Andantes behind Martha as Motown was limiting the sounds of background vocals. Since the Andantes played a pivotal role in the Motown sound, it's often confusing as to which members of the Vandellas sang on the recordings with Martha. It's confirmed, though, that Lois sang on Vandellas hits such as "I Should Be Proud" and "Bless You" and the entire Black Magic album, the Vandellas' final album, released in 1972.

Lois Reeves heavily contributed to the group's choreography especially when Sandra Tilley joined the group in 1969. The two are considered by Martha to be the best dancers and most elegant of all the Vandellas.

At the end of the year, the group split up and Lois joined background singing group Quiet Elegance, who played a role in singing background for Al Green's pivotal seventies work on songs such as "Call Me", "Livin' for You" and "L-O-V-E". Quiet Elegance, formed in 1971, also did background voice work with The Temptations; Temptations members Melvin Franklin and Otis Williams were the original organizers of the group. It was at a Temptations show in Memphis in 1972, where Hi Records' Willie Mitchell saw the group and signed them to a recording contract for his label. The group also performed on tour with both Al Green and Engelbert Humperdinck before disbanding in 1977.

=== Later career ===
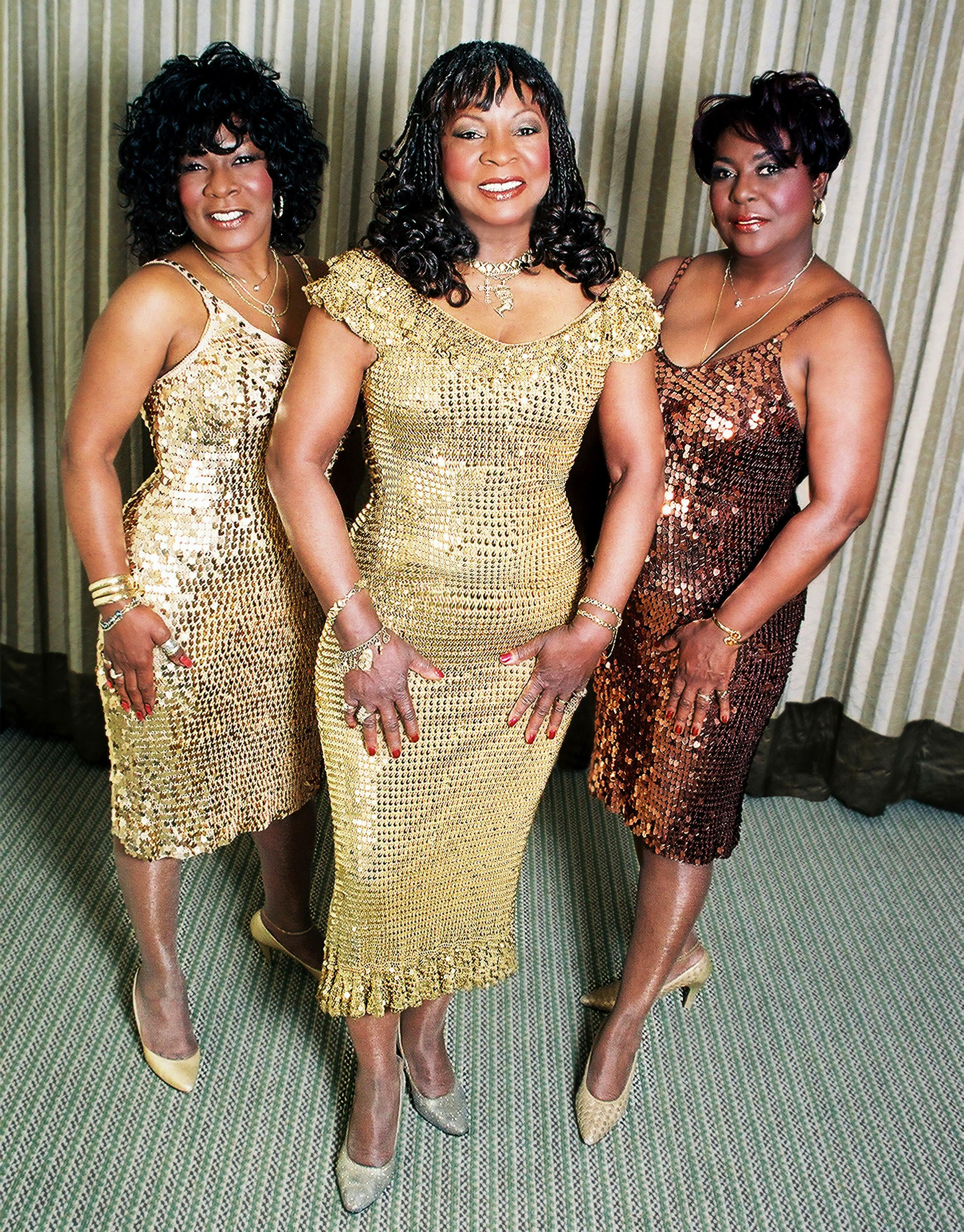
Reeves (left) as part of Martha and the Vandellas in 2004

In the late 1970s, Lois quit singing and opened a night spot in Detroit with her then-husband. A few years later she closed the business, got divorced, and found herself back on the road as a Vandella, this time with younger sister Delphine. In 1990, she released the single "Patience Is a Virtue" and the album track "Sweet Temptation" for Ian Levine's Motorcity project. "Patience Is a Virtue" is one of the songs on the Ladies Of Soul 2 Motorcity album.

Lois continues singing with her sisters Martha and Delphine as Martha Reeves and the Vandellas. Her contribution to her tenure as member of the Vandellas led to her being inducted in 1995 into the Rock & Roll Hall of Fame, The Rhythm & Blues Hall Of Fame, and the Vocal Group Hall of Fame in 2003. She continues to reside in Detroit where she lives near her siblings and occasionally does consultant work for the NAACP, Detroit Chapter. Lois has also been involved with work for the Detroit Symphony Orchestra. Motown Records held a 50th anniversary celebration, "Bop to the Ballroom", at the Roostertail in Detroit on November 20, 2009; Lois was one of those attending and celebrating fifty years of Motown music.
