= Love Bug Leave My Heart Alone =

Single by Martha and the Vandellas

from the album Riding High
- B-side: "One Way Out"
- Released: August 3, 1967
- Recorded: Hitsville USA; 1967
- Genre: R&B; psychedelic soul
- Label: Gordy
- Songwriter(s): Richard Morris; Sylvia Moy
- Producer(s): Richard Morris

Martha and the Vandellas singles chronology
"Jimmy Mack" (1967)	"Love Bug Leave My Heart Alone" (1967)	"Honey Chile" (1967)

"Love Bug Leave My Heart Alone" is a song by Motown girl group Martha and the Vandellas, released as a single in 1967. The song's production was a departure from the Vandellas' repertoire as their label, Motown, was having a harder time staying with the times in the music industry and having a much harder time finding a hit for its acts after several departures including Vandellas collaborators William "Mickey" Stevenson and Holland-Dozier-Holland, who produced the B-side to this single, "One Way Out", one of the trio's final recordings with the Vandellas. Produced by Richard Morris, the song displayed of the narrator wanting "the love bug" (i.e., her former lover) to leave her alone so she won't "fall in love". The narrator, lead singer Martha Reeves, was left heart-broken the last time she allowed the man to come back to her but after suffering heartbreak, she expresses her disgust at the man's attempts, with her fellow members Rosalind Ashford and Betty Kelly chanting "get outta there, love bug, leave my heart alone". The song (with its unusual-for-Motown fuzz guitar) was their second consecutive top 40 single of 1967 peaking at number twenty-five on the Billboard Pop singles chart and number fourteen on the Billboard Hot R&B singles chart. The record was the first track ever played on BBC Radio 1 by DJ John Peel.

== Personnel ==
- Lead vocals by Martha Reeves
- Background vocals by Rosalind Ashford and Betty Kelly
- Instrumentation by the Funk Brothers
- Written by Richard Morris and Sylvia Moy
- Produced by Richard Morris
