= I'm Ready for Love =

Single by Martha and the Vandellas

from the album Watchout!
- B-side: "He Doesn't Love Her Anymore"
- Released: October 6, 1966
- Studio: Hitsville U.S.A., Detroit and in Los Angeles
- Length: 2:54
- Label: Gordy
- Songwriter: Holland–Dozier–Holland
- Producers: Brian Holland and Lamont Dozier

Martha and the Vandellas singles chronology
"My Baby Loves Me" (1966)	"I'm Ready for Love" (1966)	"Jimmy Mack" (1967)

"I'm Ready for Love" is a song by the American girl group Martha and the Vandellas. It was issued as a single by Motown in October 1966. The song, produced and written by Holland–Dozier–Holland, and was written in a similar style to the Supremes' smash hit, "You Can't Hurry Love".

== Background ==
The Vandellas' version was issued as the first official release off the group's 1966 album, Watchout!, though the album's actual first single, the emotive ballad "What Am I Going to Do Without Your Love" bombed on the chart. This song renewed the Vandellas' popularity among mainstream audiences with its top ten showing.

Cash Box said that it is a "hard driving rocker has the girls spilling out a potent, effective romance lyric in a mood that should have every dancer who spins the disk on the floor."

== Chart performance ==
Scoring their biggest hit since "Nowhere to Run", rose to No. 9 on the Billboard Hot 100 and No. 2 on Billboard's Hot R&B singles chart. "I'm Ready For Love" was also a chart hit for the group in the UK where the song peaked at No. 22 on the UK singles chart.

== Other recordings ==
- Other than the Vandellas, The Temptations also recorded a version of this song that was released on their 1967 album In A Mellow Mood.
