= Debbie Dean (singer) =

American singer (1928–2001)

- Born: Reba Jeanette Smith; February 1, 1928; Corbin, Kentucky, U.S.
- Died: February 17, 2001 (aged 73) Ojai, California, U.S.
- Genres: Pop
- Labels: Motown; Treva

Reba Jeanette Smith (February 1, 1928 – February 17, 2001), known professionally as Debbie Dean, Penny Smith, and Debbie Stevens, was an American singer who was the first white solo artist to record for Motown.

== Biography ==
Born Reba Jeanette Smith on February 1, 1928, in Corbin, Kentucky. She was the fourth child of Walter B. Smith, a railroad engineer by his wife, Alma, a housewife. Debbie Dean recorded as Penny Smith and Debbie Stevens at various labels before arriving at Motown in the early 1960s, and was Motown's first white female solo recording artist, signed by Berry Gordy.

Unlike most of the early Motown recording artists, Dean preferred rock and roll to R&B and blues. She was popular in the Chicago area in the mid and late 1950s, recording as "Penny Smith" and "Debbie Stevens", as well as singing on radio. T.V., and at record hops in the Chicago area. Her husband, Jim Lounsbury, was a pioneer Rock and Roll radio, television, and record hop celebrity in the Chicago area at that time, and also hosted two T.V. dance shows at various times called "Banstand Matinee" and "The Record Hop".

In February 1959, as "Debbie Stevens", she was asked to join the "Winter Dance Party" tour after Buddy Holly, The Big Bopper, and Ritchie Valens were killed in a plane crash in Iowa. In 1960, Berry Gordy Jr. recruited her to join his new Motown record label in Detroit, and signed her to a three-year recording contract, thus becoming Motown's first white female solo recording artist. Mr. Gordy also changed her stage name to "Debbie Dean". At Motown, Dean worked with the early stars at the Motown house in Detroit, now known as Hitsville U.S.A. Her first single was "Don't Let Him Shop Around" (#1007, 1961), an answer song to the Miracles' #1 hit "Shop Around" on which The Miracles themselves sing background vocals. The song made "The Music Reporter R & B Top Fifty" for over two months, reaching #14. Her subsequent singles at Motown were less successful, and with the advent of new artists, her three-year contract was not renewed.

After leaving Motown, Dean moved to Hollywood where she sang in local bands, and was under contract with the Treva label in Hollywood that produced and released the single "Take My Hand" ("Little Miss Righteous"). She also appeared as an actress in several movies in the mid-60's, including "Hot Rods to Hell", "Hotel", and others. In 1966 she met Deke Richards (born Dennis Lussier) and was the vocalist in his band, "Deke and the Deacons," performing in various clubs in the Hollywood area. It was during this time Motown had begun setting up offices in the Sunset-Vine tower, in Hollywood. Based on Dean's friendship with Berry Gordy, she introduced Richards to him, and both Dean and Richards signed contracts with Motown in October 1966—Dean as a writer/singer and Richards as a writer/producer.

Dean and Richards co-wrote songs for The Supremes, The Temptations, the Four Tops, Smokey Robinson, Martha and the Vandellas, Edwin Starr, and other Motown artists. In 1968, her single "Why Am I Lovin' You" was released on Motown's V.I.P. label. The song has since become a Northern Soul favorite and popular in the U.K. Dean also recorded several tracks that remained unreleased at the time, but have since been released on various "unreleased" Motown compilations. Her song, Also, her single, "Billy Boy's Tune", recorded as Debbie Stevens in the late 1950s, has been released as part of a "Rock-a-billy" collection.

She died on February 17, 2001 in Ojai, California.

== Selected discography ==
=== Motown singles ===
- "Don't Let Him Shop Around" b/w "A New Girl" (M 1007)
- "Itsy Bity Pity Love" b/w "But I'm Afraid" (M 1014)
- "Everybody's Talkin' About My Baby" b/w "I Cried All Night" (M 1025)
- "Why Am I Lovin' You" b/w "Stay My Love" (V.I.P. 25044)
