= Deke Richards =

American producer (1944–2013)

- Also known as: Deke Lussier
- Born: Dennis Lussier; April 8, 1944; Los Angeles, California, U.S.
- Died: March 24, 2013 (aged 68) Bellingham, Washington, US
- Genres: Rhythm and blues, pop
- Occupations: Record producer, songwriter
- Years active: 1962–2013
- Label: Motown
- Formerly of: The Corporation

Deke Richards (born Dennis Lussier; April 8, 1944 – March 24, 2013), also known as Deke Lussier, was an American songwriter and record producer who was affiliated with Motown. He was a member of both the Clan and the Corporation, the latter a production team that wrote and produced some of the Jackson 5's early hits.

== Biography ==
He was born in Los Angeles, California. His father was the screenwriter Dane Lussier. Deke Lussier portrayed one of the band members in the movie Eegah in 1962. He later used the stage name Deke Richards. While playing in a band that backed singer Debbie Dean, he wrote a song for her, and met Berry Gordy when The Supremes played at the Hollywood Palace in 1966. Gordy signed Richards to a contract as a record producer and songwriter.

Richards also wrote and produced for Bobby Darin, Martha and the Vandellas, The Blackberries, Stacie Johnson, and others, and produced Diana Ross and the Supremes after Holland, Dozier and Holland left Motown in 1968. He co-wrote the U.S. no.1 hit "Love Child" for the Supremes, and was responsible for "I'm Still Waiting", a UK no.1 hit, for Diana Ross. He and fellow writer Sherlie Matthews also formulated the vocal sextet Celebration, which released an album on Motown's Mowest label, in an attempt to replicate the success of the 5th Dimension.

Richards died of esophageal cancer on March 24, 2013, at age 68.
