= Martha and the Vandellas =

American soul singers

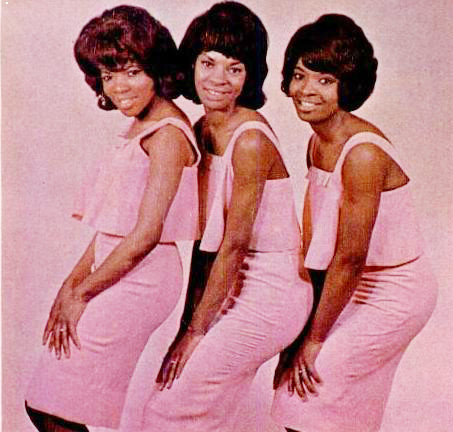
- Martha and the Vandellas in 1965. (L-to-R): Rosalind Ashford, Martha Reeves, Betty Kelly.

Background information
- Also known as: The Del-Phis (1957–1961); The Vels (1961–1962); Martha Reeves & the Vandellas (1967–1973)
- Origin: Detroit, Michigan, U.S.
- Genres: R&B; soul; pop
- Years active: 1957–1973
- Label: Gordy
- Past members: Martha Reeves; Rosalind Ashford-Holmes; Annette Beard-Helton; Gloria Williams; Betty Kelly; Lois Reeves; Sandra Tilley; Roschelle Laughhunn

Martha and the Vandellas (known from 1967 to 1973 as Martha Reeves & the Vandellas) were an American girl group formed in Detroit, Michigan, in 1957. The group achieved fame in the 1960s as a major act for Motown Records. Formed by friends Annette Beard, Rosalind Ashford and Gloria Williams, Martha Reeves eventually joined the group, and she became its lead vocalist after Williams's departure in 1962. The group signed with Gordy Records, a subsidiary of Motown.

The group's hits included "Heat Wave" (1963), "Quicksand" (1963), "Dancing in the Street" (1964), "Nowhere to Run" (1965), "I'm Ready for Love" (1966), "Jimmy Mack" (1967) and "Honey Chile" (1967). Six of the group's songs reached the top ten on the US Billboard Hot 100 chart and thirteen of their songs reached the top twenty on the US Billboard R&B singles chart, including two number ones. Selected members of the group were inducted into the Rock and Roll Hall of Fame in 1995 and the National Rhythm & Blues Hall of Fame in 2013.

== History ==
=== Early years (1957–1962) ===
Teenagers Rosalind Ashford and Annette Beard first became acquainted after a local music manager hired them to be members of a girl group he named the Del-Phis. Ashford, Beard, and lead vocalist Gloria Williams performed at local clubs, private events, church benefits, YMCA events and school functions. They were also being coached by Maxine Powell at Detroit's Ferris Center. One of the group's first professional engagements was singing background for singer Mike Hanks.

The group originally had up to six members, subsequently reduced to four. When one of the four left the group, she was replaced by Alabama-born vocalist Martha Reeves, a former member of two groups, the Fascinations and the Sabre-Ettes. In 1960, the group signed their first recording contract with Checker Records, releasing the Reeves-led "I'll Let You Know". The Del-Phis then went to Checkmate Records, a subsidiary of Chess Records, recording the song "There He Is (At My Door)" featuring Williams on lead vocals. The songs failed to make much of an impact.

Reeves reverted to a solo artist under the name Martha LaVaille. After Motown Records staffer Mickey Stevenson saw Reeves singing at a Detroit club, he offered her an audition. Reeves showed up at Motown's Hitsville USA studios on a Tuesday rather than a Thursday, Motown's usual audition day. Stevenson assigned her as his secretary eventually responsible for handling Motown's auditions. By 1961, the group, then known as The Vels, were recording background vocals for Motown acts. Prior to her success as lead singer of the Elgins, Saundra Edwards (then going by her surname Mallett) recorded the song "Camel Walk", in 1962, which featured the Vels in background vocals. That year, the quartet began applying background vocals for emerging Motown star Marvin Gaye, singing on Gaye's first hit single, "Stubborn Kind of Fellow" After Mary Wells failed to make a scheduled recording session due to a short illness, the Vels recorded what was initially a demo recording of "I'll Have to Let Him Go". Motown was so impressed by the group's abilities, and Martha's lead vocals, that the label CEO Berry Gordy offered the group a recording contract. Figuring that being in show business was too rigorous, Williams left the group. With Williams out, the remaining trio of Ashford, Beard and Reeves were told by Gordy that they would need a new name. After failing to come up with a name on their own, Gordy gave the group the name The Vandellas. In an interview with The History Makers, Ashford stated that the Vandellas were not named after Della Reese and Van Dyke Avenue, however Reeves disputed this in a 2026 interview by stating that they were named after Della Reese and Van Dyke Avenue.

=== Motown success and stardom (1962–1967) ===
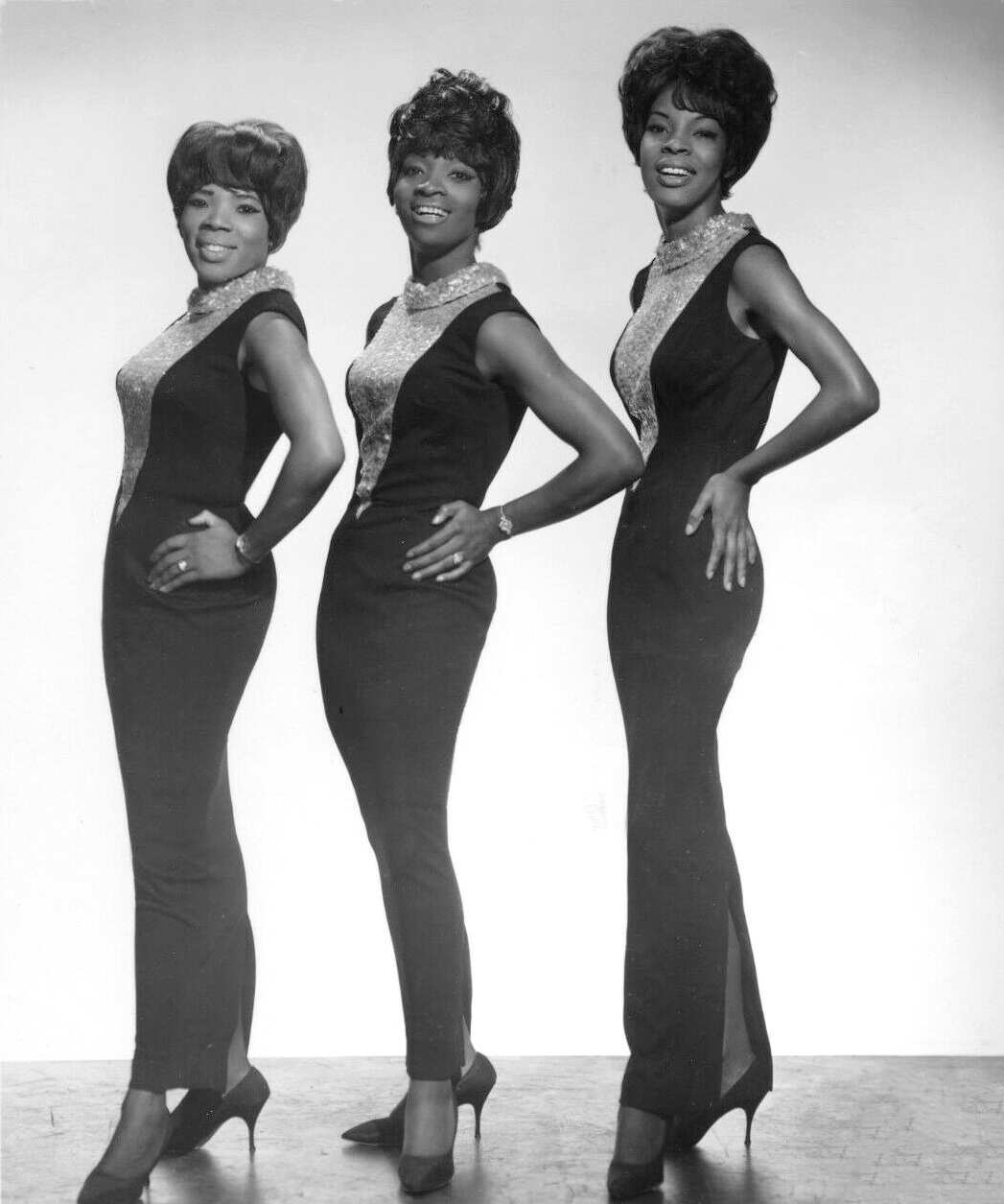
Publicity photo of Rosalind Ashford, Betty Kelly and Martha Reeves, c. 1965

During this period, the Vandellas were hired to sing background for Marvin Gaye after the label's premier backing vocalists, the Andantes, were unable to make the session. The Vandellas contributed background on Gaye's first hit records, "Stubborn Kind of Fellow", "Hitch Hike" and "Pride and Joy" and would on many occasions back Gaye onstage for a couple of years. In 1963, their second single under the name Martha and the Vandellas, "Come and Get These Memories", the first song composed and produced by the team of Holland-Dozier-Holland, became the group's first hit rising to number six on the Hot Rhythm & Blues Sellers chart and crossing over to number 29 on the Billboard Hot 100. Their follow-up, "Heat Wave" (originally titled "(Love Is Like A) Heat Wave"), became their first top ten pop hit, peaking at number four on the Hot 100 during the last two weeks of September 1963 and staying at number one on the R&B chart for five weeks, resulting in their only Grammy Award nomination for Best R&B Performance. Their next hit, "Quicksand", debuted on the Hot 100 at #75 during the week of the assassination of President John F. Kennedy and also reached the top ten, peaking at number eight during the first week of January 1964. Two successive follow-ups, "Live Wire" and "In My Lonely Room", however, failed to reach the Billboard top 40 and the group began experiencing problems, with Gordy and Motown focusing their efforts on the group's rivals, the Supremes, whose single "When the Lovelight Starts Shining Through His Eyes", became their first top 40 hit. Just as this was happening, Annette Beard left the group in 1964. Reeves would later claim in her memoirs that Beard left on her own accord due to being pregnant, though Beard would claim Reeves forced her out of the group. Beard was quickly replaced by Betty Kelly, formerly of the Velvelettes.

In the summer of 1964, the group released "Dancing in the Street", co-written by Gaye, Mickey Stevenson and Ivy Jo Hunter. The dance song became their signature single, peaking at number 2 on the Billboard Hot 100, where they were unable to unseat Manfred Mann's "Doo Wah Diddy" off the top spot. The song became their first hit in the UK, initially peaking at number 21 on the UK Singles Chart. Five years later, a re-issue of the song helped to send it to number four. The song became a million-selling hit and has since become one of the most played singles in music history. Their follow up, "Wild One", only managed to peak at number 34, however the next single afterwards, HDH's "Nowhere to Run" gave the group their fourth top ten single on the Billboard Hot 100, reaching number eight on the chart and number 26 in the UK and becoming as well known for the group as "Heat Wave" and "Dancing in the Street". Due to Reeves' soulful vocals and the Vandellas' brassy harmonies, they were often considered the "soulful" alternative to the more pop-oriented Supremes. After successive singles such as the group's first ballad single, "Love (Makes Me Do Foolish Things)" and "You've Been in Love Too Long" only performed modestly on the charts, they reached the US top 30 with another ballad, "My Baby Loves Me" in 1966. The group returned to the US top ten that same year with the song "I'm Ready for Love", which reached number nine on the Billboard Hot 100, becoming their fifth top ten US hit, while peaking at number 2 on the R&B chart and number 29 in the UK. By this period, the Andantes began to sing on these tracks with Reeves, with Ashford and Kelly sometimes not being featured on the songs. In early 1967, more than two years after it was recorded, the HDH pop ballad, "Jimmy Mack", was released and reached number ten on the Billboard Hot 100 and reached number one on the R&B chart, their first number one single there in four years. "Jimmy Mack" served as the last top ten single on the pop chart for the group.

Appearances on television shows such as The Ed Sullivan Show, The Mike Douglas Show, American Bandstand and Shindig! helped to keep the group high-profile during this period as other Motown groups such as the Supremes, the Temptations and the Four Tops were enjoying bigger crossover success. On June 28, 1965, the Reeves/Ashford/Kelly lineup of the Vandellas performed "Nowhere to Run" on the CBS special Murray The K - It's What's Happening, Baby while skipping through a Ford Motor Company auto plant in Detroit and sat on a Ford Mustang as it was being assembled.

=== Later years, disbandment and exit from Motown (1967–1973) ===
Following the success of "Jimmy Mack", Motown Records began experiencing a commercial drought as the label's former staff writers and producers Mickey Stevenson and Holland-Dozier-Holland all left in 1967, citing royalty issues with the label, leaving many of the label's original acts, including Martha and the Vandellas, in a rut. Motown hired songwriters Sylvia Moy and Richard Morris to compose songs for Reeves, resulting in the recordings "Love Bug Leave My Heart Alone" and "Honey Chile". At the time, the music industry itself was going through rapid changes and the crossover Motown pop sound was falling out of favor with audiences, mainly in the black community. Artists such as Aretha Franklin, Otis Redding and recently signed Motown act Gladys Knight & the Pips brought in grittier soul music while the Temptations and Marvin Gaye were starting to record psychedelic soul, which forced many other Motown acts to adapt. Both "Love Bug Leave My Heart Alone" and "Honey Chile" were departures from the group's earlier pop-soul recordings that made them famous. Both songs reached the US top 40, with "Honey Chile" peaking at number eleven. "Honey Chile" also became the first to be released under the moniker Martha Reeves & the Vandellas, joining the recent moniker changes of the Supremes (Diana Ross and the Supremes) and the Miracles (Smokey Robinson and the Miracles). During this period, Reeves and Kelly had a falling out and Kelly soon was fired from the group and promptly replaced by Reeves' sister Lois. Around this time, the group began performing at engagements at the Copacabana, where a live recording was produced but was later shelved.

Despite the early promise of continued success after "Honey Chile", their next release, "I Promise to Wait My Love", a more direct response to the Southern soul sound of Franklin and Knight, only managed to reach number 62 on the Billboard Hot 100, their lowest position since "What Am I Going to Do Without Your Love" peaked at number 71 two years earlier. Their next single, "I Can't Dance to That Music You're Playing", barely missed the US top 40 in 1968. That year, Reeves reportedly suffered badly from an acid-laced drink while at a party and soon found herself in a mental ward for a couple of weeks. As a result, the group suffered and began fading away from the spotlight. In 1969, Ashford was let go from the group and was told that Reeves didn't want her in the group anymore. She was replaced by Sandra Tilley, another former member of The Velvelettes. The group re-emerged later that year with the album, Sugar 'n' Spice. The leading single, "Taking My Love and Leaving Me", which featured the Andantes and Syreeta Wright on background vocals along with a hoarse Reeves, was their first single since "I'll Have to Let Him Go" to not make the Billboard Hot 100 though top 40 re-issues of their previous songs such as "Forget Me Not" in the UK kept the group going for the time being. The group seemed to be on the verge of a comeback two years later, however, when the dance song, "Bless You" (1971) was released, peaking at number 53 on the Billboard Hot 100, number 33 in the UK, number 16 in Canada and number 2 in Puerto Rico; the Vandellas notably promoted the song while performing on Soul Train around that time. It would become the group's 24th and last single to appear on the Billboard Hot 100. In response to the song's moderate success, Motown issued what would be the final album from the group, Black Magic, in 1972. The group's final singles, "In and Out of My Life" and "Tear It On Down", the latter originally recorded by their former collaborator Marvin Gaye, were only modestly successful on the R&B charts.

After holding a concert at Detroit's Cobo Hall on December 21, 1972 with sister Lois Reeves and Tilley, it was reported in March 1973 that Reeves had made the decision to leave the Vandellas, promptly ending the group as a recording unit. After learning of Motown's permanent move to Los Angeles, Reeves decided to leave Motown as well, negotiating her way out of her contract with the label. Reeves wrote in her memoirs, Dancing in the Street: Confessions of a Motown Diva, that she thought of retirement until her longtime friend, Eddie Kendricks, formerly of The Temptations, convinced her to continue her career. Reeves decided to relocate to Los Angeles and signed to MCA Records, where her self-titled debut, Martha Reeves, produced by rock producer Richard Perry, was released. The album was a critical success but failed to produce hits despite Reeves performing well-received renditions of Joe Simon's "Power of Love" and Van Morrison's "Wild Night". Reeves would continue to record with various labels including Fantasy Records and Arista Records with little success. During the mid-1970s, Reeves fell into an addiction to cocaine and alcohol as well as prescription medication. However, after a visit to a Baptist church in 1977, Reeves became a born-again Christian.

=== Post-breakup ===
After the Vandellas' disbandment, Lois Reeves sang with the group Quiet Elegance and sang background for Al Green, while Sandra Tilley retired from show business in 1972, dying of a brain aneurysm in 1983 at the age of thirty-seven. Original member Gloria Williams, who retired from show business when she left the group, died in 2000.

In 1978, Reeves and original Vandellas Ashford and Beard reunited at a Los Angeles benefit concert for actor Will Geer.

In 1983, Reeves successfully sued for royalties from her Motown hits and the label agreed to have the songs credited as Martha Reeves and the Vandellas from then on. That year, Reeves performed solo at Motown 25, which alongside some of their songs being placed on the Big Chill soundtrack, helped Reeves and the Vandellas gain a new audience.

In 1998, Reeves and her sister Vandellas performed during the Half Time Show at Super Bowl XXXII.

In 1989, original members Ashford and Beard also sued Motown for royalties. During this time, the original trio were inspired to reunite both as a recording act and in performances. They were offered a recording contract with Ian Levine at Motorcity Records who issued the group's first single since the Vandellas disbanded seventeen years earlier called "Step into My Shoes".

Although they are no longer singing together full-time, Martha Reeves and the Vandellas have occasionally reunited for various concerts. Ashford, with full name Rosalind Ashford-Holmes (died on September 15, 2026), and Beard, whose full name now is Annette Beard-Helton (Sterling), performed as "The Original Vandellas", with other singers, most notably Mary Wilson of the Supremes, Pat Lewis, and Roschelle Laughhunn. Reeves, with her sisters Lois and Delphine Reeves, tour as "Martha Reeves and the Vandellas".

In 2004, Reeves, with her sister Vandellas, appeared on the NBC special "Motown 45".

In 2006, Holmes and Beard-Helton appeared as the "Bingo Mamas" in the musical comedy "Father Bingo" which premiered at the Detroit Music Hall Center.

In 2023, Holmes and Beard-Helton (with Laughhunn) provided backup vocals for the single "Vandellas Dance" with lead by Mark Scott from The Miracles.

In 2024, Reeves and her sister Vandellas appeared on the NBC special "A Motown Christmas".

As of 2025, Beard-Helton (now known as Annette Sterling) appears with E. Young and Company.

== Musical style ==
AllMusic stated that the group was emblematic of the "distaff side of the Motown sound in the '60s."

== Popular culture ==
A remake of the song "Nowhere To Run", sung by Arnold McCuller, is heard in the film The Warriors during the scene in which the Gramercy Riffs call a hit on the Warriors.

In a season one episode of the television show The Golden Girls, Blanche describes her car as the "noisiest thing to come out of Detroit since Martha & The Vandellas."

Candice Bergen, who hosted the Saturday Night Live episode on which Martha Reeves appeared in its inaugural season, made sure that Martha Reeves and the Vandellas were a presence throughout her Murphy Brown series. The group's picture was displayed prominently in Murphy's office. When Aretha Franklin guest starred and Murphy tried to sing with her, Franklin stopped her, saying, "I'm not Martha, and you ain't no Vandella."

The group is briefly portrayed in the 2017 film Detroit, performing "Nowhere to Run" at the Fox Theatre in Detroit.

== Awards and accolades ==
In 1993, Martha Reeves and the Vandellas were awarded the Pioneer Award by the Rhythm & Blues Foundation.

Except for pre-Vandellas member Gloria Williamson and Vandellas member Sandra Tilley, all members of the group were inducted to the Rock & Roll Hall of Fame in 1995, becoming the second all-female group to be inducted. They were inducted by rock group The B-52's, whose frothy dance music was inspired by the Vandellas.

Martha and the Vandellas' "Dancing in the Street" was inducted into the Grammy Hall of Fame in 1999 (they were nominated for Best R&B Vocal Performance by a Duo or Group for the song in 1964).

Two of their singles, "(Love Is Like a) Heat Wave" and "Dancing in the Street" were included in the list of The Rock and Roll Hall of Fame's 500 Songs that Shaped Rock and Roll.

They were inducted into the Vocal Group Hall of Fame in 2003.

In 2004, Rolling Stone ranked the group No. 96 on their list of the 100 Greatest Artists of All Time.

In 2005, Martha & the Vandellas were voted into the Michigan Rock and Roll Legends Hall of Fame.

Martha Reeves and the Vandellas were nominated for UK Festival Awards in 2010 and 2011 as "Best Headliner".

Martha and the Vandellas were inducted in the inaugural class of the National Rhythm & Blues Hall of Fame on August 17, 2013.

== Lineups ==
The Del-Phis
1957–1962

- Gloria Williams
- Martha Reeves
- Rosalind Ashford-Holmes
- Annette Beard-Helton

Martha & the Vandellas
1962–1964

- Martha Reeves
- Rosalind Ashford-Holmes
- Annette Beard-Helton

Martha & the Vandellas
1964–1967

- Martha Reeves
- Rosalind Ashford-Holmes
- Betty Kelly

Martha Reeves & the Vandellas
1967–1969

- Martha Reeves
- Rosalind Ashford-Holmes
- Lois Reeves

Martha Reeves & the Vandellas
1969–1973

- Martha Reeves
- Lois Reeves
- Sandra Tilley

== Discography ==
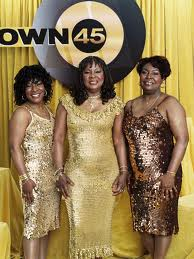
Martha Reeves and the Vandellas at Motown 45, 2004

For a detailed listing of albums and singles, see Martha and the Vandellas discography

=== Albums ===
- Come and Get These Memories (1963)
- Heat Wave (1963)
- Dance Party (1965)
- Greatest Hits (1966)
- Watchout! (1966)
- Martha and the Vandellas Live! (1967)
- Ridin' High (1968)
- Sugar 'n' Spice (1969)
- Natural Resources (1970)
- Black Magic (1972)

=== Top 10 singles ===
The following singles reached the top 10 on the Billboard Hot 100 song chart in the U.S.

- "Heat Wave" (1963)
- "Quicksand" (1963)
- "Dancing in the Street" (1964)
- "Nowhere to Run" (1965)
- "I'm Ready for Love" (1966)
- "Jimmy Mack" (1967)

== Awards and recognition ==
- Martha Reeves and the Vandellas' "(Love Is Like a) Heat Wave" and "Dancing in the Street" were inducted to the Grammy Hall of Fame and were both included in the list of The Rock and Roll Hall of Fame's 500 Songs that Shaped Rock and Roll.
- They were inducted to the Rock & Roll Hall of Fame in 1995 becoming just the second all-female group to be inducted and the fifth group in the Motown roster to be inducted.
- They were inducted to the Vocal Group Hall of Fame in 2003.
- They were nominated for a Grammy Award for Grammy Award for Best R&B Performance in 1964 for their hit song "Heat Wave"
- "Dancing in the Street" was included in the United States Library of Congress' National Recording Registry for its historical, artistic and cultural significance in 2006.
