= The Velvelettes =

American female vocal group

- The Velvelettes in 1963. Left to right: Mildred Gill, Norma Barbee, Carolyn Gill, Betty Kelly, and Bertha Barbee

Background information
- Origin: Detroit, Michigan, United States
- Genres: R&B, pop, soul
- Years active: 1961–1970; 1984–2004
- Label: VIP (Motown)
- Members: Carolyn Gill; Mildred Gill; Norma Barbee
- Past members: Betty Kelly; Annette McMillan; Sandra Tilley; Bertha Barbee-McNeal

The Velvelettes were an American singing girl group, signed to Motown in the 1960s. Their biggest chart success occurred in 1964, when Norman Whitfield produced "Needle in a Haystack", which peaked at number 45 on the Billboard Hot 100, and number 27 in Canada.

AllMusic stated that the Velvelettes were "very much in the Motown girl-group mold," bearing similarities to acts such as the Marvelettes, Martha & the Vandellas, and the Supremes.

== History ==
=== Early years and establishment ===
The group was founded in 1961 by Bertha Barbee-McNeal (June 12, 1940 – December 15, 2022) and Mildred Gill Arbor, students at Western Michigan University. Mildred recruited her younger sister Carolyn (also known as Cal or Caldin), who was in 9th grade, and Cal's friend Betty Kelly, a junior in high school. Bertha recruited her cousin Norma Barbee, a freshman at Flint Junior College. Cal was chosen as the group's lead singer.

A classmate at Western Michigan University, Robert Bullock, was Berry Gordy's nephew, and he encouraged the group to audition for Motown. The group signed to Motown in late 1962 and started recording in January 1963. They recorded at the Hitsville USA studio and "There He Goes" and "That's The Reason Why", produced by William Stevenson, was released as a single via the IPG Records label (Independent Producers Group). The recordings included a young Stevie Wonder playing harmonica. While the group awaited their chance at stardom, they recorded for many producers, some of which were re-recorded by other artists including fellow labelmates Martha and the Vandellas and The Supremes.

The Velvelettes got their break chartwise in the spring of 1964 thanks to young producer Norman Whitfield, who produced "Needle in a Haystack" as a single for the group, on Motown's VIP Records imprint. "Needle in a Haystack" peaked at number 45 on the Billboard Hot 100 in mid 1964. The group recorded its follow-up, "He Was Really Sayin' Somethin'", with Whitfield again producing, and spent time on various Motown-sponsored tours as a support act. In September 1964, Betty Kelly officially left the group to join Martha and the Vandellas, and the quintet became a quartet.

=== Later years and dissolution ===
The Velvelettes continued performing, with various members leaving and rejoining, as family matters dictated. By 1967, Gill, Norma and Bertha Barbee-McNeal had decided to devote all of their time to raising their families. Cal recruited two new members for concert performances: future Vandella Sandra Tilley (who was introduced by her friend Abdul Fakir of The Four Tops), and Annette McMillan.

With a song on the charts and a place on several concert tours, an album project was started using songs already recorded. However, with the growing success of other Motown groups such as The Supremes, Motown's attention was diverted and the project was left unfinished. The LP was scheduled for release on Motown's V.I.P. label, as V.I.P 401.

Motown released two additional singles, "Lonely Lonely Girl Am I" and "A Bird in the Hand" on their V.I.P. imprint. Both singles did not reach the same chart levels as their predecessors. The Velvelettes continued to record new material until September 1967, with the Nick Ashford and Valerie Simpson song "Bring Back The Sunshine", which was retitled "Dark Side of the World" when Diana Ross later released a version of the song. The final Velvelettes single release (after an internal label change to Motown's Soul subsidiary) was "These Things Will Keep Me Loving You", which made number 43 on the US R&B Charts. Carolyn Gill began dating Richard Street, lead singer of The Monitors, who later joined The Temptations. Sandra Tilley joined Martha Reeves and the Vandellas, replacing Rosalind Ashford. Gill married Street in November 1969 and he dissuaded her from continuing with the Velvelettes (preferring that his wife care for the home) so Gill decided to break up the group and it disbanded. Tilley retired from show business in the late 1970s, got married, and died in 1983 from a brain aneurysm.

In 1971, "These Things Will Keep Me Loving You" became a hit in the United Kingdom, number 34 on the UK Singles Chart. Despite the new success, the group did not reunite until 1984, following a rare concert appearance by the cousins and the sisters at the request of Barbee-McNeal. Together the Gill sisters and Barbee cousins then went on to re-record their original hits and some new songs for the album One Door Closes for Motorcity Records. The group continues to tour today.

Three decades after the group left Motown, the company released a CD, The Very Best of the Velvelettes, featuring 15 tracks, including four previously unreleased selections. A 19-track CD The Velvelettes: The Best Of was released in the UK in 2001. The 2004 The Velvelettes: The Motown Anthology is a double album with 48 tracks.

In 2006, the Velvelettes contributed to the double CD Masters of Funk, Soul and Blues Present a Soulful Tale of Two Cities. Lamont Dozier, Freda Payne, George Clinton and Bobby Taylor recorded remakes of songs from Philadelphia International Records. The Velvelettes sang "One Of a Kind Love Affair", originally recorded by the Spinners. The other CD featured Jean Carne, Bunny Sigler and Jimmy Ellis.

In 2007, the Velvelettes provided backing vocals on seven of the 11 tracks of Danish pop duo Junior Senior's second album Hey Hey My My Yo Yo, including a rap by Bertha Barbee-McNeal on "Itch U Can't Skratch".

Founding member Bertha Barbee-McNeal died of colon cancer in hospice in Kalamazoo, Michigan, on December 15, 2022, at the age of 82.

== Discography ==
=== Singles ===
List of the Velvelettes' singles
Year	Title and catalog number	US	US R&B	UK	CAN	AUS	Album	Label	
1963	"There He Goes" (IPG 45-1002) b/w "That's the Reason Why"	—	—	—	—	—	The Velvelettes^{[A]}	IPG	Motown
1964	"Needle in a Haystack" (V.I.P. 25007) b/w "Should I Tell Them"	45	31*	—	27	84	The Velvelettes^{[A]}	V.I.P.	Motown
1965	"He Was Really Sayin' Somethin'" (V.I.P. 25013) b/w "Throw a Farewell Kiss"	64	21	—	—	—	The Velvelettes^{[A]}	V.I.P.	Motown
1965	"Lonely, Lonely Girl am I" (V.I.P. 25017) b/w "I'm the Exception to the Rule"	95*	34*	—	—	—	The Velvelettes^{[A]}	V.I.P.	Motown
1965	"A Bird in the Hand (Is Worth Two in the Bush)" (V.I.P. 25030) b/w "Since You've Been Loving Me"	—	—	—	—	—	The Velvelettes^{[A]}	V.I.P.	Motown
1966	"These Things Will Keep Me Loving You" (S 35025) b/w "Since You've Been Loving Me'"	102	43	34	—	—	The Velvelettes^{[A]}	Soul	Motown
1987	"Needle in a Haystack" (MARES 28) b/w "Needle in a Haystack (Instrumental)"	—	—	—	—	—	One Door Closes	Motorcity	
1988	"Running Out of Luck" (MARES 60) b/w "Running Out of Luck (Instrumental)"	—	—	—	—	—	One Door Closes	Motorcity	
1989	"Pull My Heartstrings (MARES 116) b/w "Pull My Heartstrings (Instrumental)"	—	—	—	—	—	One Door Closes	Motorcity	
1992	"It Keeps Reminding Me (of Happy Memories)" (MOTC 51) b/w "That's When the Tears Start"	—	—	—	—	—	One Door Closes	Motorcity	
"—" denotes a single that was not released in that territory or did not chart

- ^{A} Their eponymous album was never completed and never saw release
- – Chart positions from Cashbox magazine

=== Albums ===
- 1966: The Velvelettes (not completed, scheduled for V.I.P. 401)
- 1990: One Door Closes (MOTCLP 43)

=== Compilations ===
- 1999: The Very Best of the Velvelettes
- 2001: The Velvelettes: The Best Of
- 2004: The Velvelettes: The Motown Anthology

== Bibliography ==
- Clemente, John (2000). Girl Groups Fabulous Females Who Rocked the World. Krause Publication Inc. p. 276. ISBN 978-0-87341-816-4.
- Clemente, John (2013). Girl Groups Fabulous Females Who Rocked the World. Author House. p. 623. ISBN 978-1-4772-7633-4.
