= Honey Chile =

Single by Martha Reeves and the Vandellas

from the album Ridin' High
- B-side: "Show Me the Way"
- Released: October 14, 1967
- Recorded: Hitsville USA (Studio A), 1967
- Genre: Psychedelic soul
- Length: 2:51
- Label: Gordy; G 7067
- Songwriters: Sylvia Moy; Richard Morris
- Producer: Richard Morris

Martha Reeves and the Vandellas singles chronology
| "Love Bug Leave My Heart Alone" (1967) | "Honey Chile" (1967) | "I Promise to Wait My Love" (1968) |

"Honey Chile" is a 1967 single by Martha Reeves and the Vandellas on the Gordy label, a subsidiary of Motown Records. Written by Richard Morris and Sylvia Moy, and produced by Morris, this was the first single to bill the group's name as Martha Reeves and the Vandellas as opposed to Martha and the Vandellas.

"Honey Chile" rose to number eleven on the US Billboard Hot 100 chart and number five on the US Billboard R&B singles chart.

== Background ==
The song describes how the narrator (voiced by Martha Reeves) wanting to get rid of her boyfriend who's been courting and dating other girls behind her back though she is too weak to let him go stating "I'll walk a country mile to stay with you". This song, rare for a pop song, actually shows character development: at the end of the first verse she states that she is worthless without him, while in the second to last line she says she will find the strength to leave him.

Filled with Southern connotations (inspired by Reeves' birth in rural Alabama), the song is notable for several reasons: it is the first track to feature new member, Martha's younger sister Sandra "Lois" Reeves replacing just-fired Betty Kelly, it was the group's twelfth top 40 pop single, and it was also the last top 40 hit the group would score throughout the rest of their Motown tenure though they would score several top 40 R&B singles before leaving the label in 1973. It was also the first single to be credited as Martha Reeves and the Vandellas after the label requested that some of the lead singers of several groups put their name in front of the group's to earn billing for both lead singer and group.

== Personnel ==
- Lead vocals by Martha Reeves
- Background vocals by Rosalind Ashford and Sandra "Lois" Reeves
- Instrumentation by The Funk Brothers

== Chart performance ==
| Chart (1967) | Peak position |
|---|---|
| UK Singles (The Official Charts Company) | 30 |
| US Billboard Hot 100 | 11 |
| US Best Selling Rhythm & Blues Singles (Billboard) | 5 |

== Samples and Covers ==
The song was covered by The Jackson 5 on their 1971 album Maybe Tomorrow.
