= Sylvia Moy =

American songwriter and record producer (1938–2017

Background information
- Born: Sylvia Rose Moy; September 15, 1938; Detroit, Michigan, U.S.
- Died: April 15, 2017 (aged 78) Dearborn, Michigan, U.S.
- Genres: Soul music
- Occupations: Songwriter, record producer

Sylvia Rose Moy (September 15, 1938 – April 15, 2017) was an American songwriter and record producer, formerly associated with the Motown Records group. The first woman at the Detroit-based music label to write and produce for Motown acts, she is probably best known for her songs written with and for Stevie Wonder.

== Early life and family ==
Moy grew up on the northeast side of Detroit with her eight brothers and sisters, the family performing on pots and pans to keep themselves busy and musical. Once she reached school, she played jazz and classical, but found her true place behind the scenes at Motown Records.

== Life and career ==
Born and brought up on the northeast side of Detroit, Moy studied and performed jazz and classical music at Northern High School, before she was seen performing in a club in 1963 by Marvin Gaye and Mickey Stevenson. She was given recording and songwriting contracts by Motown, but was urged to prioritize her songwriting because the company was short of material for its artists.

According to Berry Gordy's autobiography To Be Loved, Moy was directly responsible for the label's retention of Stevie Wonder. Gordy wrote that, after Stevie's voice began to change as a result of puberty, he was going to drop him from the label. It was then that Moy went to Gordy and asked "if she could come up with a hit for Stevie would he reconsider"; he agreed. Her first writing success came with "Uptight (Everything's Alright)", which she co-wrote with Henry "Hank" Cosby after hearing Wonder improvising on piano. Moy wrote lyrics to the song, which she conveyed to Wonder by singing into his headphones one line ahead as he recorded.

Among the subsequent hit singles Moy wrote and/or produced while at Motown were Stevie Wonder's "My Cherie Amour", "I Was Made to Love Her", and "Never Had a Dream Come True"; and "Honey Chile" and "Love Bug Leave My Heart Alone" by Martha and the Vandellas. She also co-wrote "This Old Heart of Mine (Is Weak for You)" with Holland-Dozier-Holland for the Isley Brothers; and "It Takes Two" with William "Mickey" Stevenson for Marvin Gaye and Kim Weston.

She later wrote theme songs for several television shows, and was involved in writing film music. She was inducted into the Songwriters Hall of Fame alongside fellow Motown songwriter and producer Hank Cosby in 2006. She also set up a non-profit group, Center for Creative Communications, working with underprivileged children in Detroit.

Moy died of complications from pneumonia in Dearborn, Michigan, on April 15, 2017, at the age of 78.

== Accolades ==
In 1969, Moy won three BMI Awards, for the songs "Honey Chile", "I Was Made to Love Her" and "Shoo-Be-Doo-Be-Doo-Da-Day".

== Selective discography ==
=== Singles ===
Year	Title	Artist	Chart	Writers	Producers
1965	"Uptight (Everything's Alright)"	Stevie Wonder	US No. 3, UK No. 14	Hank Cosby, Sylvia Moy, Stevie Wonder	Cosby, Mickey Stevenson
1966	"This Old Heart of Mine (Is Weak for You)"	The Isley Brothers	US No. 12	Holland–Dozier–Holland, Moy	Brian Holland, Lamont Dozier
1966	"It Takes Two"	Marvin Gaye & Kim Weston	US No. 14	Moy, Stevenson	Cosby, Stevenson
1967	"I Was Made to Love Her"	Stevie Wonder	US No. 2, UK No. 5	Cosby, Moy, Wonder, Lula Mae Hardaway	Hank Cosby
1967	"I'm Wondering"	Stevie Wonder	US No. 12, UK No. 12	Cosby, Moy, Wonder	Hank Cosby
1967	"Love Bug Leave My Heart Alone"	Martha & the Vandellas	US No. 25	Moy, Richard Morris	Richard Morris
1967	"Honey Chile"	Martha & the Vandellas	US No. 11	Moy, Morris	Richard Morris
1968	"Shoo-Be-Doo-Be-Doo-Da-Day"	Stevie Wonder	US No. 9	Cosby, Moy, Wonder	Hank Cosby
1969	"My Cherie Amour"	Stevie Wonder	US No. 4, UK No. 4	Cosby, Moy, Wonder	Hank Cosby
1969	"(We've Got) Honey Love"	Martha & the Vandellas	US No. 56	Moy, Morris	Richard Morris
1970	"Never Had a Dream Come True"	Stevie Wonder	US No. 67, UK No. 6	Cosby, Moy, Wonder	Henry Cosby
1971	"Forget Me Not"	Martha & the Vandellas	UK No. 11	Moy, Morris	Richard Morris
1973	"With a Child's Heart"	Michael Jackson	US No. 50	Cosby, Moy, Vicki Basemore	Freddie Perren, Fonce Mizell
