= My Baby Loves Me (Martha and the Vandellas song) =

Single by Martha and the Vandellas
- B-side: "Never Leave Your Baby's Side"
- Released: January 4, 1966
- Recorded: Hitsville USA (Studio A), Detroit, Michigan; August 23, 1965
- Genre: Soul, pop
- Length: 3:06
- Label: Gordy
- Songwriter(s): William "Mickey" Stevenson, Ivy Jo Hunter, Sylvia Moy
- Producer(s): William "Mickey" Stevenson, Ivy Jo Hunter

Martha and the Vandellas singles chronology
| "You've Been in Love Too Long" (1965) | "My Baby Loves Me" (1966) | "I'm Ready for Love" (1966) |

"My Baby Loves Me" is a 1966 soul standard by Martha Reeves but released under Martha and the Vandellas. None of the Vandellas are featured in this song. Instead, the background is sung by Motown's session group, the Andantes, and another legendary Motown group, the Four Tops. Co-written (with Sylvia Moy) and co-produced by William "Mickey" Stevenson and Ivy Jo Hunter, the song rose to No. 22 on the Billboard Hot 100 singles chart and No. 3 on the Billboard Hot R&B singles chart.

== Background ==
The song has the narrator sing of her lover and how much he loves and needs her. Reeves often refers to it as her favorite of all of her recordings. While it didn't appear on her group's regular studio albums, it would be put on their Greatest Hits album.

Cash Box described it as a "moody, medium-paced bluesy romancer about real lucky gal who seems to have an ideal relationship with her boyfriend."

== Personnel ==
- Lead vocals by Martha Reeves
- Background vocals by the Andantes and Four Tops
- Written by William "Mickey" Stevenson, Ivy Jo Hunter and Sylvia Moy
- Produced by William "Mickey" Stevenson and Ivy Jo Hunter
- Instrumentation by the Funk Brothers

== Chart performance ==
| Chart (1966) | Peak position |
|---|---|
| US Billboard Hot 100 | 22 |
| US Top Selling Rhythm & Blues Singles (Billboard) | 3 |
