= Betty Kelly =

American singer (born 1944)

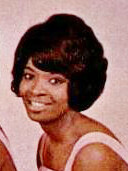
- Kelly in 1965

Background information
- Born: Betty Kelly; September 16, 1944 (age 81); Attalla, Alabama, U.S.
- Origin: Attalla, Alabama, U.S.
- Genres: R&B, soul
- Occupation: Singer
- Years active: 1961–1967
- Label: Gordy

Betty Kelly (born September 16, 1944), also known as Betty Kelley, is an American singer most noted as being a member of the popular Motown singing group Martha and the Vandellas.

== Early years ==
Born in Attalla, Alabama, Kelly moved with her family to Kalamazoo, Michigan when she was a child. In 1964, she replaced Annette Beard as a member of Martha and the Vandellas, the group led by Martha Reeves and featuring Rosalind Ashford. In 1961, she joined Motown singing group The Velvelettes.

== Martha and the Vandellas ==
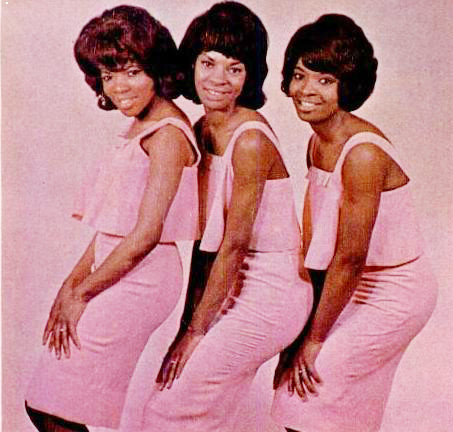
Kelly (right) with Rosalind Ashford (left) and Martha Reeves as Martha and the Vandellas in 1965

Kelly joined what became the most famed lineup of the Vandellas, which recorded "I'm Ready for Love", "Nowhere to Run" and "My Baby Loves Me". The group performed on The Ed Sullivan Show, Shindig! and American Bandstand. Kelly was fired from the group in the August 1967 was replaced by Martha's younger sister, Lois Reeves with the group's name changed to Martha Reeves and the Vandellas. She was fired due to her poor cooperation with Reeves, and Kelly was expecting a child with their bass player, Tracey Wright, at the time.

== Later years ==
After her Motown years, Kelly moved to California, where she worked for a savings and loan association until her retirement. Kelly left the music industry after she became partially deaf in one ear. In 1995, Kelly was inducted into the Rock and Roll Hall of Fame as a Vandella alongside Martha and Lois Reeves, Annette Beard, and Rosalind Ashford. She remains connected to her Motown family, participating with Janie Bradford's Annual Heroes & Legends Awards, working with other artists at music festivals such as "Sunset Junction," and most recently attending a special artist family night of "Motown: The Musical" on Broadway.

== Notes ==
Clemente, John (2000). Girl Groups—Fabulous Females That Rocked The World. Iola, Wisc. Krause Publications. pp. 276. ISBN 0-87341-816-6.
