= The Andantes =

American female session group

- The Andantes in 1964. Left to right: Jackie Hicks, Marlene Barrow, and Louvain Demps.

Background information
- Also known as: The Darnells
- Origin: Detroit, Michigan, United States
- Genres: Pop; R&B; soul; psychedelic soul; doo-wop; disco
- Years active: 1958–1972; 1989–1992
- Labels: Motown, Motorcity Records
- Past members: Jackie Hicks (1958–1972; 1989–1992); Marlene Barrow (1958–1972; 1989–1992); Emily Phillips (1958–1961); Louvain Demps (1961–1972; 1989–1992); Pat Lewis (1989–1992)

The Andantes were an American female session group for the Motown record label during the 1960s. Composed of Jackie Hicks, Marlene Barrow, and Louvain Demps, the group sang background vocals on numerous Motown recordings, including songs by Martha Reeves & the Vandellas, the Temptations, Stevie Wonder, the Four Tops, Jimmy Ruffin, Edwin Starr, the Supremes, the Marvelettes, Marvin Gaye and the Isley Brothers, among others. It is estimated they appeared on 20,000 recordings.

The Andantes provided back-up singing on Motown singles starting in 1962. The group was most prominently used on all of the Four Tops' Holland–Dozier–Holland-produced hits, including "Baby I Need Your Loving", "I Can't Help Myself (Sugar Pie Honey Bunch)", "Reach Out I'll Be There", and more. Motown began to use the Andantes as either substitute or additional background vocalists on certain recordings by its girl groups beginning with the Marvelettes recordings in 1965, Martha & the Vandellas in 1966, and a major part of the Supremes' recordings between 1968–1969 although Mary Wilson and Cindy Birdsong continued to record.

In 1963, the Andantes, with the Marvelettes, released the single "Too Hurt to Cry, Too Much in Love to Say Goodbye" b/w "Come on Home" as credited to the Darnells. In 1964 they released a single of their own called "(Like A) Nightmare" b/w "If You Were Mine", though none of the actual Andantes sang lead on either track (future Marvelette Ann Bogan performed the lead vocals).

The Andantes are also featured on some records that were not produced by Motown Records, the most prominent example being Jackie Wilson's "(Your Love Keeps Lifting Me) Higher and Higher" (Pat Lewis substitutes for Louvain Demps on this track). In the late 1980s and early 1990s, The Andantes were signed to Motorcity Records, recording songs on their own, as well as once again serving as backing vocalists to fellow former Motown artists. During this time, Lewis had joined the group as a full-time member.

In addition to various awards, the Andantes were inducted into the Rhythm and Blues Music Hall of Fame in August 2014.

Marlene Barrow died on February 23, 2015, at the age of 73. Pat Lewis died on September 2, 2024, at the age of 76.

== Motown ==
Throughout the 1960s and early 1970s, the Andantes appeared as backing vocalists on many of Motown's recorded singles, as the Funk Brothers also had when providing instrumentation. Seven of these singles that they provided background vocals for would go on to chart at the number one position on the Billboard Hot 100 popular music chart.

=== Chart-topping hits ===
- "My Guy" – Mary Wells
- "Stop! In the Name of Love" – The Supremes
- "I Can't Help Myself (Sugar Pie Honey Bunch)" – Four Tops
- "Reach Out I'll Be There" – Four Tops
- "Love Child" – Diana Ross & the Supremes
- "I Heard It Through the Grapevine" – Marvin Gaye
- "Ain't No Mountain High Enough" – Diana Ross (with Nickolas Ashford, Valerie Simpson, Jo Armstead, Jimmy Beavers, Brenda Evans, and Billie Calvin

=== Brenda Holloway ===
The Andantes appeared on many singles for Brenda Holloway. These include:

- "When I'm Gone"
- "Operator"
- "You Can Cry on My Shoulder"
- "Together 'Til the End of Time"
- "Just Look What You've Done"

=== The Four Tops ===
The Andantes appeared as backing vocalists on 16 singles for the Four Tops. These releases include:

- "Baby I Need Your Loving"
- "Without the One You Love (Life's Not Worth While)"
- "Ask the Lonely"
- "I Can't Help Myself (Sugar Pie Honey Bunch)"
- "It's the Same Old Song"
- "Something About You"
- "Shake Me, Wake Me (When It's Over)"
- "Reach Out I'll Be There"
- "Standing in the Shadows of Love"
- "Bernadette"
- "7-Rooms of Gloom"
- "You Keep Running Away"
- "Walk Away Renee"
- "If I Were a Carpenter"
- "I'm in a Different World"
- "Still Water (Love)"

=== The Supremes ===
They appeared as backing vocalists on seven singles for the Supremes. These releases include:

- "Stop! In the Name of Love" (with group members Florence Ballard and Mary Wilson)
- "Children's Christmas Song"
- "In and Out of Love" (with Florence Ballard and Mary Wilson)
- "Forever Came Today"
- "Love Child"
- "I'm Livin' in Shame"
- "The Composer"

=== Martha & the Vandellas ===
They appeared as backing vocalists on twelve singles for Martha & the Vandellas. These releases include:

- "You've Been in Love Too Long"
- "Love (Makes Me Do Foolish Things)" (B-Side of "You've Been in Love Too Long")
- "My Baby Loves Me" (with the Four Tops)
- "I'm Ready for Love"
- "Jimmy Mack" (with the Vandellas)
- "I Promise to Wait My Love"
- "Forget Me Not" (B-Side of "I Promise to Wait My Love")
- "I Can't Dance to That Music You're Playin'" (with Syreeta Wright)
- "(We've Got) Honey Love"
- "Taking My Love (And Leaving Me)" (with Syreeta Wright)
- "I Should Be Proud"

=== The Marvelettes ===
They appeared as backing vocalists on 15 singles for the Marvelettes. These releases include:

- "Tie a String Around Your Finger" (B-side of "As Long as I Know He's Mine")
- "A Need For Love" (B-side of "Too Many Fish in the Sea")
- "I'll Keep Holding On"
- "Don't Mess with Bill"
- "You're the One"
- "The Hunter Gets Captured by the Game"
- "When You're Young and in Love"
- "My Baby Must Be a Magician"
- "Here I Am Baby"
- "Destination: Anywhere"
- "What's Easy for Two Is So Hard for One"
- "I'm Gonna Hold On As Long As I Can"
- "That's How Heartaches Are Made"
- "Marionette"
- "A Breath-Taking Guy"

=== The Temptations ===
They appeared as backing vocalists on seven recordings for the Temptations.

- "It's Growing"
- "Get Ready"
- "Last One Out is Broken Hearted"
- "Just Another Lonely Night"
- "All I Need"
- "That'll Be the Day"
- "Love Woke Me Up This Morning"

=== Marvin Gaye ===
They appeared as backing vocalists on (at least) 15 singles for Marvin Gaye. These releases include:

- "Baby Don't You Do It"
- "What Good Am I Without You"
- "How Sweet It Is (To Be Loved by You)"
- "I'll Be Doggone" (with the Miracles)
- "Pretty Little Baby"
- "Ain't That Peculiar"
- "One More Heartache"
- "Take This Heart of Mine"
- "Little Darling (I Need You)"
- "Your Unchanging Love"
- "I Heard It Through the Grapevine"
- "Too Busy Thinking About My Baby"
- "That's the Way Love Is"
- "The End of Our Road"
- "Save the Children"

=== Marvin Gaye & Tammi Terrell ===
They also appeared as backing vocalists on these following recordings and singles for Marvin Gaye & Tammi Terrell:

- "This Poor Heart Of Mine"
- "Give In, You Just Can't Win"
- "When Love Comes Knocking At My Heart"
- "Two Can Have A Party"
- "Come On And See Me"
- "Oh How I'd Miss You"
- "Love Woke Me Up This Morning"

=== Stevie Wonder ===
The Andantes have also appeared as backing vocalists on numerous Stevie Wonder recordings, including:

- "Sunset" (B-side of "Contract on Love")
- "Kiss Me Baby"
- "Music Talk" (B-side of "Hi-Heel Sneakers")
- "Uptight (Everything's Alright)"
- "Nothing's Too Good For My Baby"
- "A Place in the Sun"
- "Hey Love"
- "I Was Made to Love Her"
- "I'm Wondering"
- "Shoo-Be-Doo-Be-Doo-Da-Day"
- "For Once in My Life"
- "Yester-Me, Yester-You, Yesterday"

== Non-Motown recordings ==
The Andantes also appear on several notable recordings produced and/or released by record companies outside of Motown, including:

- "Come On" – The Distants
- "All Right" – The Distants
- "Your Love" – Billy Kent
- "He Gave Me You" – Marv Johnson
- The Big Soul of John Lee Hooker – John Lee Hooker (with Mary Wilson)
- "Prince of Players" – Betty Everett
- John Lee Hooker on Campus – John Lee Hooker
- "To Win Your Heart" – Laura Lee
- "Agent Double-O-Soul" – Edwin Starr
- "Whispers (Gettin' Louder)" – Jackie Wilson
- "(Your Love Keeps Lifting Me) Higher and Higher" – Jackie Wilson (Pat Lewis substitutes for group member Louvain Demps)
  - The Andantes also appear on much of the accompanying Higher and Higher album
- "I Get the Sweetest Feeling" – Jackie Wilson

== Motorcity Records ==
As part of the Ian Levine's Motorcity Records project in the late 1980s and early 1990s, the Andantes were signed to the label and once again provided a service in recording backing vocals to former Motown artists. By this time, Pat Lewis had joined Jackie Hicks, Barrow and Demps (from 1989 to 1992).

Levine also recorded several songs with the Andantes, issuing a new single "Lightning Never Strikes Twice", which featured Demps on lead vocals. Most other songs recorded by the group at Motorcity had Lewis on lead vocals.

=== Motorcity recordings ===
Original recordings

- "Lightning Never Strikes Twice"
- "Hurricane"
- "Throw Love Away"
- "Step Into My Shoes" – also recorded by Martha Reeves and the Vandellas
- "Two Sides Of Love"
- "One Drop Of Rain"
- "Will You Always Be There"
- "Love Is A Bumpy Road"
- "All Around the Motorcity"

Cover versions

- "Girls Are Out To Get You"
- "Superstition"
- "Mercy, Mercy Me"
- "I Wish" – cover of the Stevie Wonder classic
- "My World Is Empty Without You"
- "The Boss"
- "Last Dance"
- "Little Darlin'"
- "Why Am I Loving You"

Unreleased tracks

- "Back In My Arms Again"
- "In And Out Of Love"
- "I Wish It Would Rain"
- "Waste of Time" (Instrumental only)

Louvain Demps – Better Times

Whilst under contract to Motorcity Records, Louvain was given the opportunity to step up to the microphone and record a full album, which was released in 1992 under the title Better Times, which includes original tunes and one cover of the Diana Ross hit "Reach Out and Touch (Somebody's Hand)".

- "On the Front Page"
- "Better times"
- "One Shot At Happiness"
- "Lost & Found"
- "Good Intentions"
- "Blind Love"
- "On the Beach"
- "My Heart Won't Say No"
- "No Time For Tears"
- "Reach Out & Touch Somebody's Hand"

Louvain recorded two further tracks with Motorcity which did not appear on the above album:

- "On Top Of the Mountain"
- "Sight And Sound"

Pat Lewis

Ian Levine has claimed that he has recorded more songs with Pat Lewis than with any other artist. Several songs recorded by Lewis whilst with Motorcity Records are:

Cover versions

- "I Want You Back"
- "Don't Leave Me This Way"
- "I'll Be There"
- "Selfish One"
- "Rescue Me"

Original recordings

- "No Right Turn"
- "Hungry For You"
- "Something's Telling Me"

== Billboard Top Ten hit songs (US pop chart) ==
Year	Song title	US	Artist
1964	"My Guy"	1	Mary Wells
1964	"How Sweet It Is (To Be Loved by You)"	6	Marvin Gaye
1965	"I Can't Help Myself (Sugar Pie Honey Bunch)"	1	Four Tops
1965	"It's the Same Old Song"	5	Four Tops
1965	"I'll Be Doggone"	8	Marvin Gaye
1965	"Ain't That Peculiar"	8	Marvin Gaye
1965	"Stop! In the Name of Love"	1	The Supremes
1965	"Uptight (Everything's Alright)"	3	Stevie Wonder
1965	"Don't Mess with Bill"	7	The Marvelettes
1966	"What Becomes of the Brokenhearted"	7	Jimmy Ruffin
1966	"I'm Ready for Love"	9	Martha & the Vandellas
1966	"Reach Out I'll Be There"	1	Four Tops
1966	"Standing in the Shadows of Love"	6	Four Tops
1966	"A Place in the Sun"	9	Stevie Wonder
1967	"Jimmy Mack"	10	Martha and the Vandellas
1967	"Bernadette"	4	Four Tops
1967	"In and Out of Love"	9	Diana Ross & the Supremes
1967	"I Was Made To Love Her"	2	Stevie Wonder
1967	"(Your Love Keeps Lifting Me) Higher and Higher"	6	Jackie Wilson
1968	"Here Comes the Judge"	8	Shorty Long
1968	" Shoo-Be-Doo-Be-Doo-Da-Day"	9	Stevie Wonder
1968	"For Once In My Life"	2	Stevie Wonder
1968	"Love Child"	1	Diana Ross & the Supremes
1968	"I'm Gonna Make You Love Me"	2	Diana Ross & the Supremes and the Temptations
1968	"I Heard It Through the Grapevine"	1	Marvin Gaye
1969	"I'm Livin' in Shame"	10	Diana Ross & the Supremes
1969	"Twenty-Five Miles"	6	Edwin Starr
1969	"What Does It Take (To Win Your Love)"	4	Jr. Walker & the All Stars
1969	"Yester-Me, Yester-You, Yesterday"	7	Stevie Wonder
1969	" Too Busy Thinking About My Baby"	4	Marvin Gaye
1969	"That's the Way Love Is"	7	Marvin Gaye
1970	"Ain't No Mountain High Enough"	1	Diana Ross
1970	"War"	1	Edwin Starr
1971	"What's Going On"	2	Marvin Gaye
1971	"Mercy Mercy Me (The Ecology)"	4	Marvin Gaye

== Billboard Top Forty hit songs (US pop chart) ==
Year	Song title	US	Artist
1963	"Your Old Standby"	40	Mary Wells
1964	"Baby I Need Your Loving"	11	Four Tops
1964	"Baby Don't You Do It"	27	Marvin Gaye
1965	"Ask the Lonely"	24	Four Tops
1965	"Something About You"	19	Four Tops
1965	"When I'm Gone"	25	Brenda Holloway
1965	"It's Growing"	18	The Temptations
1965	"I'll Keep Holding On"	34	The Marvelettes
1965	"Pretty Little Baby"	25	Marvin Gaye
1965	"I'll Always Love You"	35	The Spinners
1965	"You've Been in Love Too Long"	36	Martha & the Vandellas
1966	"I've Passed This Way Before"	17	Jimmy Ruffin
1966	"This Old Heart of Mine (Is Weak For You)"	12	The Isley Brothers
1966	"Whispers (Gettin' Louder)"	11	Jackie Wilson
1966	"My Baby Loves Me"	22	Martha & the Vandellas
1966	"Nothing’s Too Good For My Baby"	20	Stevie Wonder
1966	"One More Heartache"	29	Marvin Gaye
1966	"Shake Me, Wake Me (When It's Over)"	18	Four Tops
1966	"Get Ready"	29	The Temptations
1967	"Gonna Give Her All the Love I've Got"	29	Jimmy Ruffin
1967	"Your Unchanging Love"	33	Marvin Gaye
1967	"7 Rooms of Gloom"	14	Four Tops
1967	"You Keep Running Away"	19	Four Tops
1967	"If I Were a Carpenter"	20	Four Tops
1967	"The Hunter Gets Captured by the Game"	13	The Marvelettes
1967	"When You're Young and in Love"	23	The Marvelettes
1967	"I'm Wondering"	12	Stevie Wonder
1967	"Travelin’ Man"	32	Stevie Wonder
1968	"Forever Came Today"	28	Diana Ross & the Supremes
1968	"Walk Away Renée"	14	Four Tops
1968	"My Baby Must Be a Magician"	17	The Marvelettes
1968	"I Get the Sweetest Feeling"	34	Jackie Wilson
1969	"The Composer"	27	Diana Ross & the Supremes
1969	"I Don't Know Why"	39	Stevie Wonder
1970	"River Deep-Mountain High"	14	The Supremes and Four Tops
1970	"Stop the War Now"	26	Edwin Starr
1970	"The End of Our Road"	40	Marvin Gaye
1970	"Do You See My Love For You Growing"	32	Jr. Walker & the All Stars
1970	"Gotta Hold On To This Feeling"	21	Jr. Walker & the All Stars
1971	"Reach Out I’ll Be There"	29	Diana Ross
1971	"Floy Joy"	16	The Supremes
1972	"Automatically Sunshine"	37	The Supremes
