= Bonnie Pointer (1978 album) =

1978 album by Bonnie Pointer

Studio album by Bonnie Pointer
- Released: 1978
- Studio: Marvin Gaye Studios (Los Angeles, California); Wally Heider Studios (San Francisco, California); Gold Star Studios (Los Angeles, California); Motown Recording Studios (Los Angeles, California); Record Plant (Los Angeles, California)
- Genre: R&B
- Length: 58:54
- Label: Motown
- Producer: Berry Gordy; Jeffrey Bowen

Bonnie Pointer chronology
Bonnie Pointer (1978)	Bonnie Pointer (Purple) (1979)

Bonnie Pointer is the debut studio album by Bonnie Pointer, released in 1978 on the Motown label.

== History ==
The album was released a year after her dismissal from the Pointer Sisters, and by this time, she married Motown Records producer Jeffrey Bowen, who produced for the Temptations, Jermaine Jackson, and Commodores. The album consisted of two 1960s Motown covers from Brenda Holloway and the Elgins, and the album cover began a series of one of her "Red" and "Purple" albums. In that same year, the first single released on the album, Free Me From My Freedom/Tie Me to A Tree (Handcuff Me), was released – but banned from radio due to "raunchy lyrics", but became a hit for Pointer. The song first peaked at No. 10, No. 18, and peaked at No. 17 again in January 1979, and on No. 11 on the same chart in February 1979, reported from Jet Magazine. In 1979, a disco cover of the Elgins' Heaven Must Have Sent You, was released as a 12 inch single and became a hit, though the album contained a version more faithful to the original. The success of the single led to her appearing on numerous television shows to promote the album. In the early fall of 1979 it peaked at No. 11 on the U.S. Billboard Hot 100 and No. 10 on Cash Box that October. In 1980, she was interviewed by Jet Magazine about the meaning of the "Free Me From My Freedom".

== Reception ==
Professional ratings
Review scores
Source	Rating
AllMusic	2.5/5 stars
Christgau's Record Guide	B+

Andrew Hamilton from AllMusic gave the album 2.5 out of 5 stars stating that "For Bonnie Pointer's first LP on Motown, producer/hubby Jeffrey Bowen brought some new songs to the sessions this time. The most exciting, "Free Me from My Freedom," has a perky rhythm that's accented by a bubbly bass. Zesty backing voices matched Pointer's stinging vocal. However, the anti-women's-lib lyrics didn't go over well in the '70s. She displays softness on "My Everything", a classy ballad that isn't her forte. And she's back in her element on the disco-arranged "Heaven Must Have Sent You," but it doesn't get interesting until she starts growling. Bowen recycles the formula for "I Can't Help Myself (Sugar Pie Honey Bunch)" and "Jimmy Mack" (on her next album), but neither compares to the original, though the latter funks hard near the fade. Arresting productions and arrangements set off "I Love to Sing to You" and "More and More"; the midtempo, flamenco-flavored love songs are tastefully done. Smokey Robinson's "When I'm Gone" works better than the other Motown oldies. Bowen's sound worked better on singles and 12" releases; it gets redundant on LPs."

== Track listing ==
Side one
No.	Title	Writer(s)	Length
1.	"When I'm Gone"	Smokey Robinson	2:40
2.	"Free Me From My Freedom / Tie Me to a Tree (Handcuff Me)"	Angelo Bond, Truman Thomas	3:58
3.	"Heaven Must Have Sent You"	Holland-Dozier-Holland	5:16
4.	"Ah Shoot"	Jeffrey Bowen, T. Thomas	5:02

Side two
No.	Title	Writer(s)	Length
5.	"More And More"	Donald Charles Baldwin, J. Bowen	6:07
6.	"I Love to Sing to You"	D. Baldwin, J. Bowen	4:07
7.	"I Wanna Make It (In Your World)"	D. Baldwin, J. Bowen	3:23
8.	"My Everything"	D. Baldwin, J. Bowen	4:45

== Personnel ==
Adapted from liner notes.

- Bonnie Pointer – all background and lead vocals
- James Jamerson – bass
- Eddie Hazel – guitar, banjo, bass, electric guitar
- Ollie E. Brown – drums, percussion
- Truman Thomas – piano, synthesizer, organ, keyboards
- Nigel Olsson – drums
- Donald Charles Baldwin – bass, piano, synthesizer, electric guitar, acoustic guitar, marimba
- Jack Ashford – percussion
- Paul Riser – string arrangements
- Lee Holdridge – string arrangements

== Charts ==
The album peaked at No. 96 on the Billboard Hot 200. It also peaked at No. 34 on the Top R&B/Hip Hop Albums chart.
