= Bonnie Pointer (1979 album) =

1979 album by Bonnie Pointer

Studio album by Bonnie Pointer
- Released: 1979
- Studio: Record Plant, Los Angeles
- Genre: R&B
- Length: 31:40
- Label: Motown
- Producer: Jeffrey Bowen

Bonnie Pointer chronology
Bonnie Pointer (Red) (1978)	Bonnie Pointer (1979)	If the Price Is Right (1984)

Bonnie Pointer is the second self-titled studio album by Bonnie Pointer, released in 1979 on the Motown label. This was her second album and final album with Motown.

== History ==
The album was her second album and final album for Motown and her second after leaving the Pointer Sisters, before Pointer would leave after a lawsuit in 1981 filed by Berry Gordy, and which would be dismissed in 1982, after Gordy alleged that Pointer and Bowen threatened him. The album was one of her "purple" and "red" albums, and this album featured a purple background in the album cover. It also consisted of Pointer covering songs by the Supremes, Four Tops, and Martha and the Vandellas. In 1980, Pointer had a disco crossover hit in the United States, with I Can't Help Myself (Sugar Pie Honey Bunch) peaking at number 40 on the pop singles chart, number 42 on the soul singles chart, and number four on the dance chart. In Canada, it reached number 43 on the RPM Top 100 Singles chart. The song also peaked at number 52 in Australia. She also appeared in an advertisement from Motown in December 1979 from Jet Magazine with Switch, Commodores, Rick James, Diana Ross, Stevie Wonder, and Smokey Robinson.

== Reception ==
Professional ratings
Review scores
Source	Rating
AllMusic	3.5/5 stars

Andrew Hamilton from AllMusic gave the album 3.5 out of 5 stars stating "The second solo Motown LP from Bonnie, the cutest Pointer Sister, lacked imagination. Producer Jeffrey Bowen (her husband) only brought one original song "Deep Inside My Soul" to the session, while the rest are remakes of popular Motown recordings. Pointer's version of "I Can't Help Myself" features a clavinet, and a more complex rhythm arrangement than the Four Tops' version. Dressing classics like "Nowhere to Run," "Jimmy Mack," and "Come See About Me" with synthesizers and polyrhythms is okay for a couple of songs, but not an entire album. For a first effort it did well to nest at #63 on Billboard's Pop Album chart in 1979."

== Track listing ==
Side one
No.	Title	Writer(s)	Length
1.	"I Can't Help Myself (Sugar Pie Honey Bunch)"	Holland–Dozier–Holland	5:27
2.	"Jimmy Mack"	Holland–Dozier–Holland	4:58
3.	"When the Lovelight Starts Shining Through His Eyes"	Holland–Dozier–Holland	4:46

Side two
No.	Title	Writer(s)	Length
4.	"Deep Inside My Soul"	Donald Baldwin, Bonnie Pointer	6:07
5.	"Come See About Me"	Holland–Dozier–Holland	4:07
6.	"Nowhere to Run"	Holland–Dozier–Holland	6:35

== Personnel ==
Adapted from liner notes.

- Bonnie Pointer – all background and lead vocals
- Ollie E. Brown - drums, footstomps, percussion
- Tracey Singleton - all guitars, banjo, bass
- Earl Van Dyke - piano
- Truman Thomas - piano, keyboards
- Freddie Stone Stewart - bass, electric guitar
- Eddie Hazel - guitar
- Sly Stone - footstomps, synthesizer, electric guitar
- Frank Messina - accordion
- Alan Estes - glockenspiel, bells, vibraphone
- Jan Uvena - drums
- Benny Schultz - guitar, bass, electric guitar
- Donald Charles Baldwin - keyboards
- Nathan East - bass
- McKinley Jackson - string arrangements
- Lee Holdbridge - string arrangements

== Technical ==
- Phyllis Morris - Cover concept and design
- Brian Davis - Artwork

== Charts ==
The album peaked at No. 63 on the Billboard Hot 200. It also peaked at No. 40 on the Top R&B/Hip Hop Albums chart. It peaked at number 40 in Australia.
