= The Supremes A' Go-Go =

Album by the Supremes

Studio album by the Supremes
- Released: August 25, 1966
- Studios: Hitsville U.S.A., Detroit
- Genres: Pop; R&B
- Length: 31:54
- Label: Motown
- Producers: Brian Holland; Lamont Dozier; Hal Davis; Frank Wilson

The Supremes chronology
I Hear a Symphony (1966)	The Supremes A' Go-Go (1966)	The Supremes Sing Holland–Dozier–Holland (1967)

Singles from The Supremes A' Go-Go
- 1. "Love Is Like an Itching in My Heart" Released: April 8, 1966; 2. "You Can't Hurry Love" Released: July 25, 1966

Professional ratings
Review scores
Source	Rating
AllMusic	4/5 stars
The Rolling Stone Album Guide	2.5/5 stars

The Supremes A' Go-Go is the ninth studio album released by the Motown singing group the Supremes. It was the first album by an all-female group to reach number-one on the Billboard 200 album charts in the United States.

Included are two of the Supremes' top ten Billboard Hot 100 singles—the number-nine hit "Love Is Like an Itching in My Heart" and the number-one hit "You Can't Hurry Love". Also present on the album are covers of songs by the Elgins' ("Put Yourself in My Place"), the Four Tops' ("Baby I Need Your Loving", "I Can't Help Myself (Sugar Pie Honey Bunch)", "Shake Me, Wake Me (When It's Over)"), the Temptations' ("Get Ready"), Martha and the Vandellas' ("Come and Get These Memories"), Barrett Strong's ("Money (That's What I Want)"), the Isley Brothers' ("This Old Heart of Mine (Is Weak for You)"), Nancy Sinatra's ("These Boots Are Made for Walkin'"), and the McCoys' ("Hang On Sloopy").

Additional songs recorded for the album, but not included were: Tom Jones' "It's Not Unusual", the Miracles' "Mickey's Monkey", Stevie Wonder's "Uptight (Everything's Alright)", Marvin Gaye's "Can I Get a Witness", Martha and the Vandellas' "In My Lonely Room", and the Rolling Stones' "(I Can't Get No) Satisfaction."

== Track listing ==
=== Side One ===
1. "Love Is Like an Itching in My Heart" (Holland–Dozier–Holland) - 2:54
2. "This Old Heart of Mine (Is Weak for You)" (Holland-Dozier-Holland, Sylvia Moy) - 2:35
3. "You Can't Hurry Love" (Holland-Dozier-Holland) - 2:46
4. "Shake Me, Wake Me (When It's Over)" (Holland-Dozier-Holland) - 2:46
5. "Baby I Need Your Loving" (Holland-Dozier-Holland) - 2:59
6. "These Boots Are Made for Walkin'" (Lee Hazlewood) - 2:31

=== Side Two ===
1. "I Can't Help Myself (Sugar Pie Honey Bunch)" (Holland-Dozier-Holland) - 2:36
2. "Get Ready" (Smokey Robinson) - 2:43
3. "Put Yourself in My Place" (Holland-Dozier-Holland, John Thornton) - 2:20
4. "Money (That's What I Want)" (Berry Gordy, Jr., Janie Bradford) - 2:26
5. "Come and Get These Memories" (Holland-Dozier-Holland) - 2:18
6. "Hang On Sloopy" (Wes Farrell, Bert Russell) - 2:43

=== Unused Recordings from the A'Go-Go timeframe ===
1. "Can I Get a Witness" (Holland-Dozier-Holland)
2. "In My Lonely Room" (Holland-Dozier-Holland)
3. "Mickey's Monkey" (Holland-Dozier-Holland)
4. "(I Can't Get No) Satisfaction" (Mick Jagger, Keith Richards)
5. "Uptight (Everything's Alright)" (Henry Cosby, Sylvia Moy, Stevie Judkins)
6. "It's Not Unusual" (Gordon Mills, Les Reed)
7. "Come On and See Me" (Harvey Fuqua, Johnny Bristol)
8. "Just a Little Misunderstanding" (Luvel Broadnax-Stevie Wonder-Clarence Paul)
9. "Mother Dear" [Version 3] (Holland-Dozier-Holland)
10. "It's The Same Old Song" [Version 1] (Holland-Dozier-Holland)
11. "(Love Is Like A) Heat Wave" [Version 1] (Holland-Dozier-Holland)
12. "One Way Out" (Holland-Dozier-Holland) *Supremes vocals were erased shortly after recording*
13. "I'll Turn To Stone" (Holland-Dozier-Holland)
14. "Misery Makes Its Home In My Heart" (Smokey Robinson, Warren Moore)
15. "Slow Down" (Luvel Broadnax, Clarence Paul)
16. "Let The Music Play" (Burt Bacharach, Hal David)
17. "What Becomes of the Brokenhearted" (William Weatherspoon, James Dean, Paul Riser)
18. "With a Child's Heart" (Henry Cosby, Sylvia Moy, Vicki Basemore)
19. "Blowin' in the Wind" (Bob Dylan)

Earlier songs considered for inclusion

1. "Take Me Where You Go" (Smokey Robinson)
2. "Penny Pincher" (Holland-Dozier-Holland)
3. "It's All Your Fault" (Holland-Dozier-Holland)

== Expanded Edition ==
On April 28, 2017, Universal Music Group released "Supremes A Go Go: Expanded Edition," a two-disc limited edition re-release. Disc one contains the digitally remastered original mono and stereo editions of the album. Also on disc one are bonus tracks, alternate vocals, and alternate mixes. Disc two features alternate vocals and alternate mixes. One of the high points of the edition is the inclusion of an early version/scratch mix of "Love is Like An Itching in My Heart", in which Diana Ross' first attempt and progress of the track are heard, and a "fantasy duet" of "Shake Me, Wake Me (When It's Over)" between the Supremes and the Four Tops.

== Personnel ==
- Diana Ross – lead vocals (background vocals on "Come and Get These Memories")
- Mary Wilson – background vocals on all tracks except "Put Yourself In My Place", lead on "Come and Get These Memories"
- Florence Ballard – background vocals on all tracks except "You Can't Hurry Love" and "Put Yourself In My Place"
- The Andantes – background vocals on "Come And Get These Memories" and "Put Yourself In My Place"
- Marlene Barrow - background vocals on "You Can't Hurry Love"

Additional personnel

- Brian Holland and Lamont Dozier – producers, all tracks except those noted
- Hal Davis and Frank Wilson – producers, "This Old Heart of Mine (Is Weak for You)" "Shake Me, Wake Me (When It's Over)", "These Boots Are Made for Walkin'", "Get Ready", "Money (That's What I Want)" and "Hang On Sloopy"
- The Funk Brothers – instrumentation
- various Los Angeles-area session musicians – instrumentation
- The Detroit Symphony Orchestra – instrumentation

== Charts ==
=== Weekly charts ===
Chart (1966)	Peak position
UK Albums (Official Charts)	15
UK R&B Albums (Record Mirror)	1
US Billboard 200	1
US Top R&B/Hip-Hop Albums (Billboard)	1

=== Year-end charts ===
Chart (1966)	Rank
US Billboard 200	62
US Top R&B/Hip-Hop Albums (Billboard)	14
US Cashbox Top 100	81
Chart (1967)	Rank
US Top R&B/Hip-Hop Albums (Billboard)	22
US Cashbox Top 100	91

== See also ==
- List of number-one R&B albums of 1966 (U.S.)
