= House Party (The Temptations album) =

Studio album by The Temptations
- Released: November 4, 1975
- Recorded: 1974–1975
- Studio: Motown Recording Studios (Hollywood, CA)
- Genre: Soul, funk, disco
- Length: 34:38
- Label: Gordy; GS 973
- Producer: Jeffrey Bowen

The Temptations chronology
| A Song for You (1975) | House Party (1975) | Wings of Love (1976) |

Professional ratings
Review scores
| Source | Rating |
|---|---|
| Allmusic | 3/5 stars |

House Party is a 1975 album released by the American R&B vocal group, the Temptations, on Motown Records' Gordy label.

== Overview ==
This album is made up of vaulted songs recorded both prior to and following the sessions for A Song for You. House Party contains the final sessions recorded by falsetto Damon Harris as a member of the group, as well as the first for his replacement, Glenn Leonard. The sessions featured a slew of producers and composers from both within and outside of the Motown stable. The completed project was overseen by Jeffrey Bowen, who produced A Song for You and the subsequent album, Wings of Love.

The Temptations were not given creative input on the final release, to which Otis Williams referred in his autobiography Temptations as a "mismatched collection of, pardon my French, shit." Despite Williams' reservations regarding the circumstances surrounding the compilation and release of these tracks, as well as the album's perceived lack of commercial appeal, fans of the group have given House Party favorable reviews in the years since its release.

Brothers Brian and Eddie Holland, collectively two-thirds of the Holland–Dozier–Holland hit-making stable, worked on the first track and only single, "Keep Holdin' On", while Stax Records stalwart Steve Cropper contributed to three songs as producer and/or writer. Vocal highlights include a rare lead performance by Otis Williams on his own composition, "Darling, Stand by Me (Song for My Woman)", the Richard Street-led ballad, "If I Don't Love You This Way" (a cover of a song by the Jackson 5 originally featured on their Dancing Machine album and named by the family group's lead singer Michael Jackson as one of his favourite songs); Glenn Leonard's debut in the ensemble vocal of "What You Need Most (I Do Best of All)"; and fan-favorite bass singer Melvin Franklin's lead vocals on "Ways of a Grown-Up Man."

== Track listing ==
Side one
| No. | Title | Writer(s) | Lead vocalist(s) | Length |
|---|---|---|---|---|
| 1. | "Keep Holdin' On" | Brian Holland, Eddie Holland | Edwards | 3:55 |
| 2. | "It's Just a Matter of Time" | Frank Johnson | Edwards | 3:31 |
| 3. | "You Can't Stop a Man in Love" | George Soule, Terry Woodford | Edwards | 3:50 |
| 4. | "World of You, Love, and Music" | Steve Cropper, Artie Wayne | Edwards | 4:04 |
| 5. | "What You Need Most (I Do Best of All)" | Dennis Edwards, David English, Damon Harris, Richard Street, Otis Williams | Williams, Street, Franklin, Leonard | 3:19 |
| Total length: | | | | 18:39 |

Side two
| No. | Title | Writer(s) | Lead vocalist(s) | Length |
|---|---|---|---|---|
| 6. | "Ways of a Grown-Up Man" | Cropper, Richard Cason, Billy Ray Charles | Franklin | 4:05 |
| 7. | "Johnny Porter" | Bobby Ray Appleberry, Bill Cuomo | Edwards | 4:39 |
| 8. | "Darling, Stand by Me (Song for My Woman)" | Edwards, English, Street, Williams | Williams | 3:44 |
| 9. | "If I Don't Love You This Way" | Leon Ware, Pam Sawyer | Street | 3:31 |
| Total length: | | | | 15:59 |

== Personnel ==
Performers

- Dennis Edwards – vocals (baritone/tenor)
- Melvin Franklin – vocals (bass)
- Damon Harris – vocals (first tenor/falsetto)
- Glenn Leonard – vocals (first tenor/falsetto)
- Richard Street – vocals (third tenor/second tenor)
- Otis Williams – vocals (second tenor/baritone)

Producers

- James Anthony Carmichael and Suzee Ikeda – "What You Need Most (I Do Best of All)", "Darling, Stand by Me" and "If I Don't Love You This Way"
- Steve Cropper – "World of You, Love, and Music", "Ways of a Grown-up Man" and "Johnny Porter"
- Brian Holland – "Keep Holdin' On"
- Clayton Ivey and Terry Woodford – "It's Just a Matter of Time" and "You Can't Stop a Man in Love"
- The Temptations – "What You Need Most (I Do Best of All)" and "Darling, Stand by Me"

== Charts ==
| Year | Album | Chart positions | |
| Year | Album | US | US R&B |
|---|---|---|---|
| 1975 | House Party | 40 | 11 |

=== Singles ===
| Year | Single | Chart positions | | | |
| Year | Single | US | US R&B | US AC | UK |
|---|---|---|---|---|---|
| 1976 | "Keep Holdin' On" | 54 | 3 | — | — |
"—" denotes releases that did not chart
