= I Hear a Symphony =

- Side A of the Canadian single

Single by the Supremes

from the album I Hear a Symphony
- B-side: "Who Could Ever Doubt My Love"
- Released: October 6, 1965
- Recorded: September 22, 28–30, 1965
- Studio: Hitsville U.S.A. (Studio A)
- Genre: Pop, R&B
- Length: 2:38
- Label: Motown; M 1083
- Songwriter: Holland–Dozier–Holland
- Producers: Brian Holland; Lamont Dozier

The Supremes singles chronology
"Nothing but Heartaches" (1965)	"I Hear a Symphony" (1965)	"My World Is Empty Without You" (1965)

"I Hear a Symphony" is a 1965 song recorded by the Supremes for the Motown label.

Written and produced by Motown's main production team, Holland–Dozier–Holland, the song became their sixth number-one pop hit on the Billboard Hot 100 pop singles chart in the United States for two weeks from November 14, 1965, through November 27, 1965. On the UK singles chart, the single peaked at number thirty-nine.

== History ==
=== Overview ===
The Supremes enjoyed a run of hits through 1964 and 1965 under the guidance of writer/producers Holland–Dozier–Holland. In mid-1965, the producers came to realize they had fallen into a rut when the Supremes' "Nothing but Heartaches" failed to make it to the Top Ten, missing it by just one position and breaking the string of number-one Supremes hits initiated with "Where Did Our Love Go." Motown chief Berry Gordy was displeased with the performance of "Nothing but Heartaches," and circulated a memo around the Motown offices that read as follows:

We will release nothing less than Top Ten product on any artist; and because the Supremes' world-wide acceptance is greater than the other artists, on them we will only release number-one records.

Holland-Dozier-Holland therefore set about breaking their formula and trying something new. The result was "I Hear a Symphony," a song with a more complex musical structure than previous Supremes releases. "Symphony" was released as a single in place of another Holland-Dozier-Holland Supremes song, "Mother Dear", which had been recorded in the same style as their earlier hits.

In a 1968 interview, Diana Ross said that this was one of her favorite songs to perform, even though its key register posed some challenges.

Billboard called the song a "blockbuster" as well as a "well-written rhythm ballad with pulsating beat and top vocal work." Cash Box described it as a "rhythmic, medium-paced romancer about a lucky gal who’s head-over-heels in love with the special guy of her dreams." Record World said that "The Supremes will hear a symphony of coin for 'I Hear a Symphony.'"

"I Hear a Symphony", later issued on an album of the same name, became the Supremes' sixth number-one hit in the United States. After the number-five hit "My World Is Empty Without You" and the number-nine hit "Love Is Like an Itching in My Heart," the Supremes began a run of four more number-one hits: "You Can't Hurry Love," "You Keep Me Hangin' On," "Love Is Here and Now You're Gone," and "The Happening." The group performed the hit song on The Mike Douglas Show on November 3, 1965.

== Personnel ==
- Lead vocals by Diana Ross
- Background vocals by Florence Ballard and Mary Wilson
- Instrumentation by the Funk Brothers
  - Baritone saxophone by Mike Terry

== Charts ==
=== Weekly charts ===
Chart (1965–1966)	Peak position
Australia (Kent Music Report)	48
Canada (Billboard)	1
Canada Top Singles (RPM)	17
Netherlands (Dutch Top 40)	35
New Zealand (Lever Hit Parade)	5
UK Singles (Official Charts)	39
US Billboard Hot 100	1
US Hot R&B/Hip-Hop Songs (Billboard)	2
US Cash Box Top 100	1
[US [Cashbox (magazine)|Cash Box R&B]]	2
US Record World 100 Top Pops	1
US Record World Top 40 R&B	3

=== Year-end charts ===
Chart (1966)	Rank
US Cash Box Top 100	72

== Certifications and sales ==
Region	Certification	Certified units/sales
United States	—	1,000,000
Summaries
Worldwide	—	2,000,000

== See also ==
- List of Hot 100 number-one singles of 1965 (U.S.)
