= Soul Sounds (album) =

Studio album by Chris Clark
- Released: May 1967
- Genre: R&B
- Length: 31:36
- Label: Motown

Chris Clark chronology
Soul Sounds (1967)	CC Rides Again (1969)

Soul Sounds is the debut album by soul singer Chris Clark, released in 1967 (catalogue number MOS 664). As a white artist on a label for which artists were predominantly black, the album made Clark a cult heroine. The album is considered one of Motown's most collectable.

== Track listing ==
No.	Title	Writer(s)	Length
1.	"I Want To Go Back There Again"	Berry Gordy	2:30
2.	"Love's Gone Bad"	Holland-Dozier-Holland	2:20
3.	"Born To Love You Baby"	Jennie Lee Lambert, Mickey Gentile	2:20
4.	"If You Should Walk Away"	Berry Gordy, Frank Wilson	3:00
5.	"Whisper You Love Me Boy"	Holland-Dozier-Holland	2:32
6.	"Got To Get You into My Life"	Lennon, McCartney	2:25
7.	"Day By Day Or Never"	Berry Gordy	2:30
8.	"From Head To Toe"	Smokey Robinson	2:41
9.	"Do Right Baby, Do Right"	Berry Gordy	2:45
10.	"Until You Love Someone"	Holland-Dozier-Holland	2:52
11.	"Put Yourself In My Place"	Holland-Dozier-Holland, John Thornton	2:48
12.	"Sweeter As The Days Go By"	Frank Wilson, Marcus Gordon	2:53

== Reception ==
- Allmusic link
