= Glasshouse (song) =

- Dutch release picture sleeve

Single by The Temptations

from the album A Song for You
- B-side: "The Prophet"
- Released: June 18, 1975
- Recorded: 1975
- Studio: Motown
- Genre: Rhythm and blues
- Length: 3:54 (album version); 3:02 (single version)
- Label: Gordy
- Songwriter: Charlemagne
- Producers: Jeffrey Bowen, Berry Gordy

The Temptations singles chronology
"Shakey Ground" (1975)	"Glasshouse" (1975)	"Keep Holdin' On" (1975)

"Glasshouse" is a 1975 R&B single by The Temptations. It was written by Motown songwriting team Charlemagne, which consisted of James Carmichael, Ronald Miller and Kathy Wakefield. The song appeared on the album A Song for You. It was the last top forty hit for The Temptations, going to number thirty-seven on the Billboard Hot 100 and number nine on the R&B charts. "Glasshouse" also peaked in the top ten on the US Disco chart.

== Background ==
All five Temptations alternate lead vocals, singing about how people who live in glasshouses "shouldn't throw no stones".

== Chart performance ==
Chart (1975–76)	Peak position
U.S. Billboard Disco File Top 20	8
US Billboard Hot 100	37
US Hot Soul Singles (Billboard)	9
