= Stop! In the Name of Love =

- Artwork for US vinyl single

Single by the Supremes

from the album More Hits by the Supremes
- B-side: "I'm in Love Again"
- Released: February 8, 1965
- Recorded: January 5, 7, 11, 1965
- Studio: Hitsville U.S.A. (Studio A)
- Genre: Pop; R&B; soul
- Length: 2:52
- Label: Motown
- Songwriter: Holland–Dozier–Holland
- Producers: Brian Holland; Lamont Dozier

The Supremes singles chronology
"Come See About Me" (1964)	"Stop! In the Name of Love" (1965)	"Back in My Arms Again" (1965)

More Hits by The Supremes track listing
- 12 tracks Side one: 1. "Ask Any Girl"; 2. "Nothing but Heartaches"; 3. "Mother Dear"; 4. "Stop! In the Name of Love"; 5. "Honey Boy"; 6. "Back in My Arms Again"; Side two: 7. "Whisper You Love Me Boy"; 8. "The Only Time I'm Happy"; 9. "He Holds His Own"; 10. "Who Could Ever Doubt My Love"; 11. "(I'm So Glad) Heartaches Don't Last Always"; 12. "I'm In Love Again"

Lyric video
- "Stop! In the Name of Love" by the Supremes on YouTube

"Stop! In the Name of Love" is a 1965 song recorded by the Supremes for the Motown label.

Written and produced by Motown's main production team Holland–Dozier–Holland, "Stop! In the Name of Love" held the number 1 position on the Billboard pop singles chart in the United States from March 27, 1965, through April 3, 1965, and reached the number 2 position on the soul chart.

Billboard named the song number 38 on their list of 100 Greatest Girl Group Songs of All Time. The BBC ranked "Stop! In the Name of Love" at number 56 on The Top 100 Digital Motown Chart, which ranks Motown releases by their all time UK downloads and streams.

In 2001, the 1965 recording of "Stop! In the Name of Love" by The Supremes was inducted into the Grammy Hall of Fame.

In 2021, it was listed at No. 254 on Rolling Stone's "Top 500 Greatest Songs of All Time".

== History ==
The song was written by Eddie Holland, Lamont Dozier, and Brian Holland.

The Supremes recorded "Stop! In the Name of Love" in January 1965 and released as a single on February 8. The song was included on the Supremes' sixth album, More Hits by The Supremes, and was nominated for the 1966 Grammy Award for Best Contemporary Rock & Roll Group Vocal Performance, losing to "Flowers on the Wall" by the Statler Brothers.

Cash Box described it as "a rousing, shufflin’ pop-blues romancer about a gal who cautions her boyfriend to go a little bit slower" that should "continue in [the Supremes] fantastic chart-riding ways." Record World said "These girls can't be stopped. And so they have another one that is on its way to the top spot. Diana, Florence and Mary have the knack and so does their home base, Motown Records."

The Supremes' choreography for this song involved one hand on the hip and the other outstretched in a "stop" gesture. They performed it on an episode of the ABC variety program Shindig! which aired on Wednesday, February 24, 1965.

== Personnel ==
- Lead vocals by Diana Ross
- Backing vocals by Florence Ballard, Mary Wilson and the Andantes: Jackie Hicks, Marlene Barrow and Louvain Demps
- All instruments by the Funk Brothers
  - Johnny Griffith – organ
  - James Gittens – piano
  - Joe Messina – guitar
  - James Jamerson – bass
  - Benny Benjamin – drums
  - Jack Ashford – vibraphone
  - Mike Terry – baritone saxophone

== Charts ==
=== Weekly charts ===
Chart (1965)	Peak position
Australia (Kent Music Report)	42
Belgium (Ultratop 50 Flanders)	12
Belgium (Ultratop 50 Wallonia)	16
Canada Top Singles (RPM)	3
Germany (GfK)	3
Iceland (Íslenski Listinn)	10
Luxembourg (Billboard)	4
Netherlands (Dutch Top 40)	21
UK Singles (Official Charts)	7
US Billboard Hot 100	1
US Hot R&B/Hip-Hop Songs (Billboard)	2
US Cashbox Top 100	1
US Cashbox R&B	1
US Record World 100 Top Pops	1
US Record World Top 40 R&B	1
Chart (1989)	Peak position
UK Singles (Official Charts)	62

=== Year-end charts ===
Chart (1965)	Rank
Belgium (Ultratop 50 Flanders)	63
Japan Foreign Hits (Billboard)	24
Netherlands (Dutch Top 40)	100
UK Singles (OCC)	93
US Billboard Hot 100	20
US Hot R&B/Hip-Hop Songs (Billboard)	14
US Cashbox Top 100	24
US Cashbox R&B	16

== Certifications ==
Region	Certification	Certified units/sales
United Kingdom (BPI) Sales since 2005	Silver	200,000^{‡}
United States (RIAA)	Gold	1,000,000
^{‡} Sales+streaming figures based on certification alone.

== Cover versions ==
- The Isley Brothers' covered it in 1966 on the album This Old Heart of Mine
- The Hollies' version in 1983 peaked in the US at number 29 and in Canada at number 31, from the album What Goes Around...
- Scottish singer Barbara Dickson released her version in 1983 from the album Heartbeats, peaking at number 29 in Belgium.

The song was covered as part of a mash-up on Fox's Glee along with "Free Your Mind" by En Vogue " in the episode "Never Been Kissed"

== See also ==
- List of Hot 100 number-one singles of 1965 (U.S.)
