= Heaven Must Have Sent You =

1966 single by the Elgins

Single by the Elgins

from the album Darling Baby
- B-side: "Stay in My Lonely Arms"
- Released: October 1966
- Genre: Soul
- Label: V.I.P. (Motown)
- Songwriter: Holland–Dozier–Holland
- Producer: Holland–Dozier–Holland

The Elgins singles chronology
"Darling Baby" (1965)	"Heaven Must Have Sent You" (1966)	"It's Been a Long, Long Time" (1967)

"Heaven Must Have Sent You" is a song written by Brian Holland, Lamont Dozier, and Eddie Holland when at Motown, and first recorded by the Elgins in 1966. It was also a 1979 disco hit single by Bonnie Pointer.

== The Elgins version ==
The version by the Elgins, released on the Motown subsidiary V.I.P. Records label in 1966, reached No. 9 on the Billboard R&B chart and No. 50 on the US Billboard Hot 100. Popular on the Northern soul scene in the UK, it was reissued in by Tamla Motown in 1971, and reached No. 3 on the UK Singles Chart. The Elgins' backing vocals were augmented by The Andantes.

=== Charts ===
Chart (1966)	Peak position
US Billboard Hot 100	50
US Billboard R&B	9
US Cash Box Top 100	65

Chart (1971)	Peak position
UK (OCC)	3

=== Certifications ===
Region	Certification	Certified units/sales
United Kingdom (BPI)	Silver	200,000^{‡}
^{‡} Sales+streaming figures based on certification alone.

== Bonnie Pointer version ==
"Heaven Must Have Sent You"

Single by Bonnie Pointer

from the album Bonnie Pointer
- B-side: "Heaven Must Have Sent You" (LP Version)
- Released: June 1979
- Recorded: 1978
- Genre: Disco
- Length: 5:12; 3:22 (7" version); 7:12 (12" version)
- Label: Motown
- Songwriter: Holland–Dozier–Holland
- Producers: Jeffrey Bowen; Berry Gordy

Bonnie Pointer singles chronology
"Tie Me to a Tree" (1978)	"Heaven Must Have Sent You" (1979)	"Deep Inside My Soul" (1980)

"Heaven Must Have Sent You" was one of two remakes of Motown hits recorded by Bonnie Pointer for her 1978 self-titled solo debut album which was released by Motown. Pointer would state: "I wanted to cut that tune and the other old Motown tune: 'When I'm Gone', simply because I've always dug them." Pointer has stated that she suggested to Berry Gordy that he have her remake "Heaven Must Have Sent You" as a disco track after Pointer had heard the Village People hit "Y.M.C.A." and realized that "Heaven Must Have Sent You" would work well with an arrangement similar to that of "Y.M.C.A".

Set to a 12/8 shuffle beat, Pointer's disco version of "Heaven Must Have Sent You" features violins in the background throughout the track; the ringing of rhythmic tubular bells is heard during the intro, giving way to a funky bass guitar heard as a refrain throughout the song. The bass guitar part can be heard three times between the verses, and the bells are heard again in the instrumental interlude played mid-song. During the track's outro, Pointer sings "It's heaven, it's heaven, I'll love you more and more each day..." in a lower register with a raspy tone, reminiscent of Louis Armstrong. Pointer had spontaneously "channeled" Armstrong while recording her vocal for the album version of "Heaven Must Have Sent You" and the result was considered sufficiently catchy to be brought forward to the disco version of the song.

The album version, which is more faithful to The Elgins' original, clocked at 5 minutes and 14 seconds and features both Pointer scatting and a funky banjo solo by Earl Scruggs in the middle. The 12 inch was issued with an edit of the original album version as B-side.

The disco version of Pointer's "Heaven Must Have Sent You" became a hit over the summer and early fall of 1979 peaking at No. 11 on the U.S. Billboard Hot 100 and No. 10 on Cash Box that October. She also scored a minor hit on the Adult Contemporary chart at No. 43. It was also a hit in other countries such as Australia, Canada, New Zealand, and specially in Mexico, where it topped the charts in 1979.

The special four-on-the-floor re-recorded Motown Disco 12" Single mix of "Heaven Must Have Sent You" includes a much longer instrumental interlude with extra percussion and string solos towards the middle of the song. It was Side 1, while the album version was Side 2.

=== Chart history ===
==== Weekly charts ====
Chart (1979)	Peak position
Australia (Kent Music Report)	31
Belgium (Ultratop 50 Flanders)	23
Canada RPM Top Singles	32
Mexico (Billboard Hits of the World)	1
New Zealand (RIANZ)	21
US Billboard Hot 100	11
US Billboard Dance	8
US Billboard R&B	52
US Cash Box Top 100	10

==== Year-end charts ====
Chart (1979)	Rank
Australia	140
Canada	189
US Billboard Hot 100	43
US Cash Box	69

== See also ==
- List of number-one hits of 1979 (Mexico)
