= Darling Baby =

Studio album by the Elgins
- Released: October 1966
- Recorded: 1965–1966
- Genre: Soul, R&B, Pop
- Label: V.I.P. (Motown); V.I.P. 400; Tamla Motown (UK, 1968); TML 11081
- Producer: Brian Holland; Lamont Dozier

The Elgins chronology
Darling Baby (1966)	Take the Train (1990)

Professional ratings
Review scores
Source	Rating
Allmusic	4/5 stars

Darling Baby is the debut studio album released in October 1966 by the Motown group the Elgins.

== Details ==
The LP features female singer Saundra Edwards (previously on a solo contract with Motown), with Cleo "Duke" Miller, Norman McLean, and Johnny Dawson (who previously recorded for Motown as The Downbeats). Edwards sings lead vocals on all but two tracks, "634-5789" and "When a Man Loves a Woman", on which McLean sings lead. Released on Motown's V.I.P. subsidiary in 1966, the album contains the group's first two singles for Motown, "Put Yourself In My Place" and "Heaven Must Have Sent You", which were both minor hits on the Billboard Hot 100, making No. 72 and No. 50, respectively. "Heaven Must Have Sent You" was a Top Ten hit on the US R&B Chart, reaching No. 9, and the B-Side of "Put Yourself In My Place", "Darling Baby", made a separate chart entry and reached No. 92 on the Billboard Hot 100 and No. 4 on the R&B Chart.

After one further single, "I Understand My Man", in 1967, Saundra Edwards left the group and was replaced by Yvonne Vernee Allen. She recorded with the group at Motown but nothing more was released, except for several Tamla Motown reissues in Britain. One of these, a 1971 reissue of "Heaven Must Have Sent You", became a UK hit, peaking at No. 3 in the UK Singles Chart, thanks to its popularity on the Northern soul scene, and its follow-up, "Put Yourself In My Place", also made the Top 40, reaching No. 28. Yvonne Vernee performed with the group on their subsequent UK tour.

The Elgins performed occasionally throughout the 1970s and 1980s, and a renewed version of the group recorded two albums for Ian Levine's Motorcity Records, the first of which, Take The Train, was released some 24 years after this one.

== Track listing ==
1. "Darling Baby" (Holland-Dozier-Holland) 2:34
2. "In The Midnight Hour" (Steve Cropper, Wilson Pickett) 2:12
3. "Heaven Must Have Sent You" (Holland-Dozier-Holland) 2:40
4. "I Understand My Man" (Holland-Dozier-Holland) 3:07
5. "Good Lovin'" (Arthur Resnick, Rudy Clark) 2:38
6. "It's Gonna Be Hard Times" (Berry Gordy) 2:23
7. "Put Yourself In My Place" (Holland-Dozier-Holland, John Thornton) 2:25
8. "634–5789" (Eddie Floyd, Steve Cropper) 2:25
9. "No Time For Tears" (Eddie Holland, Norman Whitfield) 2:53
10. "How Sweet It Is (To Be Loved By You)" (Holland-Dozier-Holland) 2:52
11. "Stay In My Lonely Arms" (Holland-Dozier-Holland) 3:01
12. "When A Man Loves A Woman" (Andrew Wright, Calvin Lewis) 3:08

== Personnel ==
- Saundra Edwards – lead vocals (tracks 1–7, 9–11); backing vocals (track 8 and 12)
- Norman McLean – lead vocals (tracks 8 and 12); backing vocals (tracks 1–5, 7, 9–11)
- Johnny Dawson – backing vocals (tracks 1–5, 7–12)
- Cleo "Duke" Miller – backing vocals (tracks 1–5, 7–12)
- The Andantes – backing vocals (tracks 2–4, 9–11)
- Martha and the Vandellas – backing vocals (track 6)
- The Funk Brothers – instrumentation
