= Shakey Ground =

1975 single by The Temptations

- German release picture sleeve

Single by the Temptations

from the album A Song for You
- B-side: "I'm a Bachelor"
- Released: February 1975
- Recorded: 1974
- Studio: Motown Recording Studios in Los Angeles
- Genre: Soul
- Length: 3:11
- Label: Gordy
- Songwriters: Jeffrey Bowen; Alphonso Boyd; Eddie Hazel
- Producers: Jeffrey Bowen, Berry Gordy

The Temptations singles chronology
"Happy People" (1974)	"Shakey Ground" (1975)	"Glasshouse" (1975)

"Shakey Ground" is a 1975 R&B single by the Temptations. It was co-written by Funkadelic guitarist Eddie Hazel, who plays lead guitar on the song. Funkadelic bassist Billy "Bass" Nelson also plays on the song.

== Personnel ==
- Lead vocals by Dennis Edwards
- Background vocals by Damon Harris, Richard Street, Melvin Franklin and Otis Williams
- Guitar by Eddie Hazel
- Bass by Billy Bass Nelson
- Soprano saxophone by Donald Charles Baldwin
- Instrumentation by various Los Angeles studio musicians

== Chart history ==
"Shakey Ground" was the last by the group to reach the number-one spot on the Billboard Hot Soul Singles chart: the song also crossed over to the pop chart, reaching number twenty-six on the Billboard Hot 100.

Chart (1975)	Peak position
U.S. Billboard Hot 100	26
U.S. Billboard Hot Soul Singles	1

== Notable cover versions ==
The song has been covered by many artists. Among the most famous versions are ones by Phoebe Snow who recorded a "rousing" version of it for her 1976 album It Looks Like Snow, and Etta James who recorded it for her 1988 album Seven Year Itch.
