= Wings of Love (The Temptations album) =

Studio album by The Temptations
- Released: March 10, 1976
- Recorded: 1975–1976
- Studio: Motown Recording Studios (Hollywood, CA)
- Genre: Soul, funk, disco
- Length: 31:13
- Label: Gordy; GS 971
- Producer: Jeffrey Bowen and Berry Gordy

The Temptations chronology
House Party (1975)	Wings of Love (1976)	The Temptations Do the Temptations (1976)

Professional ratings
Review scores
Source	Rating
AllMusic	2.5/5 stars

Wings of Love is a 1976 album by The Temptations for the Gordy (Motown) label, co-produced by Jeffrey Bowen and Berry Gordy.

== Background ==
Producer Jeffrey Bowen preferred Dennis Edwards to the rest of the group, and wanted to produce an Edwards solo album instead of a group album. As a result, Bowen de-emphasized the rest of the group's vocals and placed them at levels far below Edwards' leads, prompting his dismissal as the Temptations' producer after this album's release. Unsurprisingly, Edwards sings lead on all but one of the songs on the album; "China Doll" has Richard Street taking the lead vocal.

== Release ==
The album was an unsuccessful release, both commercially and critically. Wings of Love's only single, "Up the Creek (Without a Paddle)" was co-written by Sly Stone, the inspiration for many of the Temptations' late 1960s/early 1970s "psychedelic soul" records; because of tax reasons, he could not take a publishing credit on the song. Stone and other members of the Family Stone appear on "Up the Creek", as well as "Sweet Gypsy Jane" and "China Doll"

== Track listing ==
All tracks produced by Jeffrey Bowen and Berry Gordy

Side one
No.	Title	Writer(s)	Lead singer(s)	Length
1.	"Sweet Gypsy Jane"	Jeffrey Bowen, Jimmy Ford, and Truman Thomas	Dennis Edwards	4:26
2.	"Sweetness in the Dark"	Bowen, and Ford	Edwards	3:28
3.	"Up the Creek (Without a Paddle"	Bowen, Truman, and Ford	Edwards	3:06
4.	"China Doll"	Bowen, Thomas, and Ford	Richard Street	3:26

Side two
No.	Title	Writer(s)	Lead singer(s)	Length
5.	"Mary Ann"	Bowen, Donald Baldwin, and Ford	Edwards	7:41
6.	"Dream World (Wings of Love)"	Bowen, Baldwin, and Ford	Edwards	5:38
7.	"Paradise"	Bowen, Baldwin, and Ford	Edwards	3:26

== Personnel ==
- Dennis Edwards - tenor/baritone vocals
- Glenn Leonard - first tenor/falsetto vocals
- Richard Street - second tenor vocals
- Melvin Franklin - bass vocals
- Otis Williams - baritone vocals
- Sly Stone, Truman Thomas - clavinet, organ and ARP
- Freddie Stewart - bass, guitar
- William "Billy Bass" Nelson - bass, guitar
- Rusty Allen - bass
- Ollie E. Brown - drums, percussion
- Pat Rizzo, Steve Madaio - trumpet
- Donald Charles Baldwin - Moog, Moog programming, keyboards, rhythm and vocal arrangements

== Charts ==
Chart (1976)	Peak position
Finnish Albums (Suomen virallinen lista)	16
Swedish Albums (Sverigetopplistan)	32
US Billboard 200	29
