= A Song for You (The Temptations album) =

Studio album by the Temptations
- Released: January 16, 1975
- Recorded: 1974
- Studios: Motown Recording Studios (Hollywood, California)
- Genres: Soul, funk
- Length: 35:53
- Label: Gordy
- Producers: Berry Gordy; Jeffrey Bowen; James Anthony Carmichael; Suzee Wendy Ikeda; Clayton Ivey; Terry Woodford

The Temptations chronology
1990 (1973)	A Song for You (1975)	House Party (1975)

Singles from A Song for You
- 1. "Happy People" Released: November 21, 1974; 2. "Shakey Ground" Released: February 17, 1975; 3. "Glasshouse" Released: June 18, 1975

A Song for You is a 1975 album by the Temptations. It features two R&B #1 hits: "Happy People" (originally intended for recording by its authors, the Commodores), and "Shakey Ground", one of the group's final R&B #1 songs.

== Music and lyrics ==
The title track features lead singer Dennis Edwards on a song written by Leon Russell. Richard Street and Melvin Franklin sing lead on the track "Firefly".

A Song for You features a familiar device of the time used to exhibit the versatility of 1970s soul groups: one side features up-tempo cuts and the other side focuses on ballads. Several songs on side one such as "Glass House" and "Shakey Ground" featured P-Funk-backed dance grooves and even a writing credit for former Funkadelic guitarist Eddie Hazel, while side two had tracks such as "I'm a Bachelor" and "Memories", which showcased a more subdued style of soul.

== Release and reception ==
Professional ratings
Review scores
Source	Rating
AllMusic	3/5 stars
Christgau's Record Guide	C

This album, while it was initially panned by the Rolling Stone Record Guide, proved its worth, going gold (selling over 500,000 copies) and winning the 1976 American Music Award for Best R&B/Soul Album. This was also the final album by Eddie Kendricks's replacement Damon Harris, who was let go after this album. He would rejoin his Young Tempts (aka "the Young Vandals") bandmates as Impact.

== Track listing ==
A Song For You track listing
No.	Title	Writer(s)	Lead singer(s)	Length
1.	"Happy People"	Lionel Richie, Jeffrey Bowen, Donald Baldwin	Dennis Edwards	3:35
2.	"Glasshouse"	Charlemagne	Edwards,Richard Street, Melvin Franklin, Damon Harris	3:55
3.	"Shakey Ground"	Eddie Hazel, Alphonso Boyd, Jeffrey Bowen	Edwards	4:02
4.	"The Prophet"	Jeffrey Bowen, Kathy Wakefield, Larry Duncan	Franklin, Harris, Street, Otis Williams	4:24
5.	"Happy People (Instrumental)"	Lionel Richie, Jeffrey Bowen, Donald Baldwin		2:54
6.	"A Song For You"	Leon Russell	Edwards	4:34
7.	"Memories"	Donald Baldwin, Kathy Wakefield, Jeffrey Bowen	Edwards	5:56
8.	"I'm A Bachelor"	Dennis Edwards, Otis Williams, Damon Harris, Richard Street, Melvin Franklin	Edwards	4:17
9.	"Firefly"	Jesse Boyce	Street, Franklin	4:00

== Personnel ==
- Dennis Edwards - tenor/baritone vocals
- Damon Harris - first tenor/falsetto vocals
- Richard Street - third tenor/second tenor vocals
- Melvin Franklin - bass vocals
- Otis Williams - second tenor/baritone vocals
- Berry Gordy - producer
- Jeffrey Bowen - producer
- Donald Charles Baldwin - co-songwriter: ("Happy People", "Memories"), piano, clavinet, Moog, soprano saxophone solo on "Shakey Ground"
- The Commodores - tape loop on "Happy People"
- Lionel Richie - co-songwriter: ("Happy People")
- Eddie Hazel - co-songwriter: ("Shakey Ground"), guitar
- Melvin "Wah-Wah" Ragin - guitar
- Ollie Brown, James Gadson, Zachary Frazier - drums
- William "Billy Bass" Nelson - bass guitar

== Charts ==
Chart (1975)	Peak position
Australian Albums (Kent Music Report)	77
Canadian Albums (RPM)	14
Finnish Albums (Suomen virallinen lista)	9
Japanese Albums (Oricon)	62
US Billboard 200	13

== See also ==
- List of number-one R&B albums of 1975 (U.S.)
