= Happy People (The Temptations song) =

- French release picture sleeve

Single by The Temptations

from the album A Song for You
- Released: 1974
- Recorded: 1974
- Genre: Disco
- Length: 3:38
- Label: Gordy Records
- Songwriters: Donald Baldwin, Jeffrey Bowen, Lionel Richie
- Producers: Jeffrey Bowen, Berry Gordy

The Temptations singles chronology
"You've Got My Soul on Fire" (1974)	"Happy People" (1974)	"Shakey Ground" (1975)

"Happy People" is a 1974 single by The Temptations, co-written by Lionel Richie. It was the first single from the album A Song For You. In the United States, the single went to #1 on the R&B chart and #40 on the Billboard Hot 100 singles chart. "Happy People" also peaked at #11 on the disco/dance chart. The single was the first Temptations release without the guidance of Norman Whitfield since 1966.

== Personnel ==
- Lead vocals by Dennis Edwards
- Background vocals by Richard Street, Damon Harris, Melvin Franklin and Otis Williams
- Instrumentation by the Commodores
