= Love Is Like an Itching in My Heart =

- Side A of the Canadian single

Single by the Supremes

from the album The Supremes A' Go-Go
- B-side: "He's All I Got"
- Released: April 8, 1966
- Studio: Hitsville U.S.A., Detroit
- Genre: R&B, pop, soul
- Length: 2:53
- Label: Motown
- Songwriter: Holland–Dozier–Holland
- Producers: Brian Holland; Lamont Dozier

The Supremes singles chronology
"My World Is Empty Without You" (1965)	"Love Is Like an Itching in My Heart" (1966)	"You Can't Hurry Love" (1966)

The Supremes A' Go-Go track listing
- 12 tracks Side one: 1. "Love Is Like an Itching in My Heart"; 2. "This Old Heart of Mine (Is Weak for You)"; 3. "You Can't Hurry Love"; 4. "Shake Me, Wake Me (When It's Over)"; 5. "Baby I Need Your Loving"; 6. "These Boots Are Made for Walkin'"; Side two: 7. "I Can't Help Myself (Sugar Pie Honey Bunch)"; 8. "Get Ready"; 9. "Put Yourself in My Place"; 10. "Money (That's What I Want)"; 11. "Come and Get These Memories"; 12. "Hang On Sloopy"

"Love Is Like an Itching in My Heart" is a 1966 song recorded by the Supremes for the Motown label.

Written and produced by Motown's main production team of Holland–Dozier–Holland, the song was recorded in June 1965 and not released until April 1966. It was one of the few singles written by the team for the Supremes that didn't reach number one on the Billboard Hot 100 pop singles chart in the United States. Nevertheless, the song was a Top 10 hit, peaking at number nine for one week in May 1966. Billboard named the song #90 on their list of 100 Greatest Girl Group Songs of All Time.

== Overview ==
One of the group's most powerful singles, this uptempo and brassy dance single was somewhat of a departure from the group's much lighter, pop-oriented sound, with a production set for an uptempo soul sound similar to that of material by fellow Motown groups Martha and the Vandellas and the Four Tops. The lyrics tell of how the narrator has been "bitten by the love bug" and no matter what she does, she can't "scratch it" (the itch created by the bite of the love bug). Lead singer Diana Ross' bandmates Florence Ballard and Mary Wilson accompany Ross, as she sings about her lover's grasp on her heart. The girl group performed the hit live on CBS variety program The Ed Sullivan Show on Sunday, May 1, 1966.

== Reception ==
Billboard said of the song "more exciting sounds from the girls in this slow rhythm rocker with solid back beat." Cash Box described the song as a "throbbing, rhythmic, pop-blues romancer all about a real lucky gal who has finally found the guy that she’s always dreamed about." Record World called it "the new pearl in the string of Supreme hits" and said that it "has all their beloved tricks."

== Personnel ==
- Lead vocals by Diana Ross
- Background vocals by Florence Ballard and Mary Wilson
- Instrumentation by the Funk Brothers
  - Baritone saxophone by Andrew "Mike" Terry

== Charts ==
Chart (1966)	Peak position
Australia (Kent Music Report)	100
Canada Top Singles (RPM)	3
UK R&B (Record Mirror)	11
US Billboard Hot 100	9
US Hot R&B/Hip-Hop Songs (Billboard)	7
US Cashbox Top 100	9
US Cashbox R&B	6
US Record World 100 Top Pops	10
US Record World Top 40 R&B	9
