= Put Yourself in My Place (Motown song) =

Song by Holland–Dozier–Holland

Single by The Elgins

from the album Darling Baby
- B-side: "Darling Baby"
- Released: December 31, 1965
- Recorded: September 28, 1965
- Studio: Hitsville U.S.A., Detroit
- Genre: Soul
- Length: 2:25
- Label: V.I.P.
- Songwriter: Holland–Dozier–Holland

"Put Yourself in My Place" is a song written by the Motown team of Holland–Dozier–Holland and recorded by at least four Motown recording acts during the sixties: the Elgins in 1965, the Supremes, Chris Clark and the Isley Brothers in 1966.

Cash Box described the Supremes' version as a "traditional blueser".

== Charts ==
The Elgins and Supremes' versions were both issued as B-Sides in 1966, but in 1969, the Isleys' version gave the brothers a hit with it when Tamla Motown re-issued the single for the British market after they had left the company and just scored a US million-seller, "It's Your Thing" for their own T-Neck label. The song went to #13 on the UK Singles Chart, higher than their American big hit of the same year. Similarly, a 1971 Tamla Motown reissue of The Elgins' version as an A side (as a follow-up to their then-recent UK Top 3 hit, "Heaven Must Have Sent You") gave the group a Top 30 hit (#28).

== Credits ==
=== The Elgins' version ===
- Album: Darling Baby
- A-side: "Darling Baby" (1966)
- B-side: "It's Gonna Be Hard Times" (1971)
- Lead vocals by Saundra Mallett Edwards
- Backing vocals by Johnny Dawson, Cleo "Duke" Miller, and Norman McLean
- Instrumentation by The Funk Brothers

=== The Supremes' version ===
- Album: The Supremes A' Go-Go
- A-side: "You Can't Hurry Love"
- Lead vocals by Diana Ross
- Background vocals by Florence Ballard, Mary Wilson and The Andantes
- Instrumentation by The Funk Brothers

=== The Isley Brothers' version ===
- B-side: "Little Miss Sweetness"
- Lead vocals by Ronald Isley
- Background vocals by O'Kelly Isley Jr. and Rudolph Isley
- Instrumentation by The Funk Brothers

=== Chris Clark version ===
- A-side: "Love's Gone Bad"
- Lead vocals by Chris Clark
- Instrumentation by The Funk Brothers

== Chart performance ==
=== The Elgins version ===
Chart (1966)	Peak position
US Billboard Hot 100	92

Chart (1971)	Peak position
UK Singles (The Official Charts Company)	28

=== The Isley Brothers version ===
Chart (1969)	Peak position
UK Singles (The Official Charts Company)	13
