= CC Rides Again =

Studio album by Chris Clark
- Released: 1969
- Recorded: 1969
- Genre: R&B
- Length: 37:54
- Label: Weed; WS801

Chris Clark chronology
Soul Sounds (1967)	CC Rides Again (1969)

CC Rides Again is the second album by soul singer Chris Clark, released on 22 November 1969. It is the only album to be released on the Motown subsidiary label, Weed.

== Track listing ==
No.	Title	Writer(s)	Length
1.	"C.C. Rider"	Ma Rainey, Lena Arant	3:40
2.	"Spinning Wheel"	David Clayton-Thomas	4:15
3.	"How About You"	Richards, Saunders, Van de Pitte	2:50
4.	"Good Morning Starshine"	MacDermott, James Rado, Gerome Ragni	3:40
5.	"With a Little Help from My Friends"	Lennon, McCartney	4:42
6.	"One"	Nilsson	4:35
7.	"In the Ghetto"	Davis	2:39
8.	"Can I See You In the Morning"	Richards	3:21
9.	"You've Made Me So Very Happy"	Berry Gordy, Brenda Holloway, Patrice Holloway, Frank Wilson	3:40
10.	"Get Back"	Lennon, McCartney	4:32

== Reception ==
- Allmusic link
