= Nothing but Heartaches =

Single by the Supremes

from the album More Hits by The Supremes
- B-side: "He Holds His Own"
- Released: July 16, 1965
- Recorded: May 13 and 17, 1965
- Studio: Hitsville U.S.A., Detroit
- Genre: Pop, R&B
- Length: 2:55
- Label: Motown
- Songwriter: Holland–Dozier–Holland
- Producers: Lamont Dozier; Brian Holland

The Supremes singles chronology
"Back in My Arms Again" (1965)	"Nothing but Heartaches" (1965)	"I Hear a Symphony" (1965)

More Hits by The Supremes track listing
- 12 tracks Side one: 1. "Ask Any Girl"; 2. "Nothing but Heartaches"; 3. "Mother Dear"; 4. "Stop! In the Name of Love"; 5. "Honey Boy"; 6. "Back in My Arms Again"; Side two: 7. "Whisper You Love Me Boy"; 8. "The Only Time I'm Happy"; 9. "He Holds His Own"; 10. "Who Could Ever Doubt My Love"; 11. "(I'm So Glad) Heartaches Don't Last Always"; 12. "I'm In Love Again"

"Nothing but Heartaches" is a 1965 song recorded by the Supremes for the Motown label.

Written and produced by Motown songwriting and producing team Holland–Dozier–Holland, it was notable for breaking the first string of five consecutive number-one pop singles in the United States, peaking at number 11 from August 29, 1965, through September 4, 1965, on the Billboard Hot 100 chart. Despite this, it was the sixth of seven consecutive million-selling singles released by The Supremes between 1964 and 1965.

== Overview ==
=== Recording ===
By the spring of 1965, The Supremes had elevated from regional R&B favorites to an internationally successful pop group thanks to a series of five singles which consecutively topped the United States Billboard pop charts: "Where Did Our Love Go", "Baby Love", "Come See About Me", "Stop! In the Name of Love" and "Back in My Arms Again." Known for creating repetitive follow-ups, Motown at this time was relying on a formula to create songs with a similar sound present in records by The Temptations, The Four Tops and Marvin Gaye among other recording acts.

Confident that they had finally found a successful formula, Berry Gordy had Holland–Dozier–Holland create a song similar to several of their earlier hit singles. As expected, "Nothing but Heartaches" had a similar sound to "Stop! In the Name of Love" and "Back in My Arms Again." Gordy felt confident that the song would become their sixth consecutive number-one hit.

=== Reception ===
The lukewarm response to "Nothing but Heartaches" was not what Gordy had predicted, as it peaked at number eleven on the Billboard Hot 100. The song's more modest top 20 charting prompted Gordy to circulate a memo around the Motown offices:

We will release nothing less than Top Ten product on any artist; and because the Supremes' world-wide acceptance is greater than the other artists, on them we will only release number-one records.

After canceling the planned subsequent release of "Mother Dear," Holland-Dozier-Holland produced "I Hear a Symphony."

Cash Box described the song as a "rollicking pop-blues heart-throbber about a love struck gal who can’t break away from a fella who is decidedly wrong for her." Record World said that "The oh so sweet Diana Ross voice again wails as Florence Ballard and Mary Wilson chant along on a Detroit delight."

== Personnel ==
- Lead vocals by Diana Ross
- Background vocals by Florence Ballard and Mary Wilson .
- Instrumentation by the Funk Brothers
  - Baritone saxophone by Mike Terry

== Charts ==
=== Weekly charts ===
Chart (1965)	Peak position
Canada Top Singles (RPM)	4
Iceland (Íslenski Listinn)	10
Singapore (Billboard)	3
UK R&B (Record Mirror)	14
US Billboard Hot 100	11
US Hot R&B/Hip-Hop Songs (Billboard)	6
US Cashbox Top 100	8
US Cashbox R&B	3
US Record World 100 Top Pops	11
US Record World Top 40 R&B	8

=== Year-end charts ===
Chart (1965)	Rank
US Cashbox Top 100	100
US Cashbox R&B	33

== Certifications ==
Region	Certification	Certified units/sales
United States	—	1,000,000
