= Yes We Can Can =

1970 song written by Allen Toussaint

"Yes We Can"

Single by Lee Dorsey

from the album Yes We Can
- Released: 1970
- Genre: Funk, soul
- Length: 3:04
- Label: Polydor
- Songwriter: Allen Toussaint
- Producer: Allen Toussaint

"Yes We Can Can"

Single by the Pointer Sisters

from the album The Pointer Sisters
- B-side: "Jada"
- Released: February 1973
- Recorded: Pacific Recording, Wally Heider Recording/ Studio A [?] San Francisco
- Genre: Funk
- Length: 6:02 (Album Version); 3:55 (7" Version)
- Label: Blue Thumb
- Songwriter: Allen Toussaint
- Producer: David Rubinson

The Pointer Sisters singles chronology
"Destination No More Heartaches" (1972)	"Yes We Can Can" (1973)	"Wang Dang Doodle" (1973)

"Yes We Can Can" is a funk song written by Allen Toussaint, and first released by Lee Dorsey in 1970. It was popularized when it was recorded by the American R&B girl group the Pointer Sisters.

== Lee Dorsey original ==
"Yes We Can" was recorded by Lee Dorsey on his album Yes We Can, released by Polydor in 1970 and also released as a single, and co-produced with Allen Toussaint.

== Background to The Pointer Sisters cover ==
A cover of "Yes We Can" re-titled "Yes We Can Can" was recorded by The Pointer Sisters. It was producer David Rubinson's suggestion that the Pointer Sisters record the song. As Rubinson said, "I loved almost everything Allen Toussaint ever wrote," and "Yes We Can Can" was one of the songs the Pointer Sisters recorded as a demo while they were seeking a label deal.

"Yes We Can Can" was one of the first tracks the group cut in fall 1972 for their debut album. Its basic track was recorded at Pacific Recording Studio in San Francisco. The sessions were eventually moved to Studio A of Wally Heider Recording Studio in San Francisco, and Rubinson is unclear as to whether or not further recording for "Yes We Can Can" was done there.

Released in February 1973, the song became the Pointers' first hit single, reaching number 11 on the Billboard Hot 100 and number 12 on the Hot Soul Singles chart.

== Personnel ==
- Lead vocals by Anita Pointer
- Background vocals by Anita Pointer, Ruth Pointer, Bonnie Pointer and June Pointer
- Written by Allen Toussaint
- Produced by David Rubinson
- Instrumentation - DRUMS: Gaylord Birch, GUITAR: Willie Fulton, BASS: Dexter C. Plates

== Charts ==
Chart (1973)	Peak position
Australia (Kent Music Report)	86
U.S. Billboard Hot 100	11
U.S. Billboard Hot R&B/Hip-Hop Songs	12
Canadian Singles Chart	58
French Singles Chart	59
Italian Singles Chart	30
Dutch Singles Chart (the Netherlands)	25
