= In My Lonely Room =

1964 single by Martha and the Vandellas

Single by Martha and the Vandellas
- B-side: "A Tear for the Girl"
- Released: March 23, 1964
- Recorded: Hitsville U.S.A. (Studio A); January 29, 1964
- Genre: Soul
- Label: Gordy; G-7031
- Songwriter(s): Holland–Dozier–Holland
- Producer(s): Brian Holland, Lamont Dozier

Martha and the Vandellas singles chronology
| "Live Wire" (1964) | "In My Lonely Room" (1964) | "Dancing in the Street" (1964) |

"In My Lonely Room" is a 1964 single by Motown girl group Martha and the Vandellas. In this song, which registered at #6 R&B (Cashbox) and #44 Pop, the narrator solemnly discusses how her lover's flirting with other girls leave her so depressed that all she can do is sit "in my lonely room and cry". The song was produced with a more solemn though still uptempo gospel-influenced feel that had been on a number of the group's hits starting with "(Love Is Like a) Heat Wave". It was their fifth hit with Holland–Dozier–Holland.

Despite its lyrics, Cash Box described it as "a real happy thumper geared for loads of spins and sales" that is performed in an "exciting infectious fashion."

== Personnel ==
- Lead vocals by Martha Reeves
- Background vocals by Rosalind Ashford and Annette Beard
- Produced by Brian Holland and Lamont Dozier
- Written by Brian Holland, Lamont Dozier and Edward Holland, Jr.
- Instrumentation by the Funk Brothers:
  - Richard "Pistol" Allen: drums
  - Jack Ashford: vibes
  - Henry Cosby: tenor saxophone
  - Mike Terry: baritone saxophone solo
  - James Jamerson: bass
  - Robert White: guitar
  - Eddie Willis: guitar
  - Earl Van Dyke: piano

== Other recordings ==
- The Action recorded their version in 1965, produced by George Martin.
- The Supremes recorded a version of the song to the same instrumental track as The Vandellas with additional instrumentation in 1966. It was produced by Holland-Dozier and intended to be included on their album The Supremes A' Go-Go, but remained unreleased until 1998.
- Phil Collins recorded a version of the song for his album of soul covers, Going Back.
