= Donald Charles Baldwin =

American musician and composer

- Born: Donald Charles Baldwin; 20 April 1953 (age 73); Detroit, Michigan, United States
- Genres: R&B, soul, funk, Motown
- Occupations: Musician, arranger, composer
- Instruments: Piano, clarinet, saxophone, oboe, English horn, bassoon
- Years active: 1970–present
- Labels: Motown Records, Invictus Records, Hot Wax Records

Donald Charles Baldwin (born 20 April 1953) is an American musician, arranger, and composer. He achieved significant commercial success with recordings he wrote, arranged, and performed for Motown Records and Invictus/Hot Wax Records from 1970 to 1980. His Notable works include his recordings with many widely known musical acts, including The Temptations, Commodores, and Bonnie Pointer, as well as record producers Holland-Dozier-Holland and Jeffrey Bowen.

== Early life ==
Donald Charles Baldwin was born and raised in Detroit, Michigan. During his school years, he learned to play the clarinet, bass clarinet, saxophone, oboe, English horn, and bassoon while studying composition. After writing his first Concerto for Strings and Horns in 1969, Baldwin formed a contemporary style band, "Jasmine", in which he composed the music, played the piano, and sang. Jasmine performed locally in and around the Detroit area, including performances held at Wayne State University as part of the nationwide Moratorium to End the War in Vietnam.

== Career ==
=== Jasmine and career beginnings ===
Jasmine was discovered by Jeffrey Bowen, the vice-president of Holland-Dozier-Holland's Invictus/Hot Wax Records. Like H-D-H, Bowen had been with Motown Records in the mid-1960s where he was an assistant to artists and repertoire (A&R) chief Mickey Stevenson, the co-producer of The Temptations' 1967 LP In a Mellow Mood (#1 R&B, #13 Pop) and the co-writer of "You" a 1968 hit for Marvin Gaye (#7 R&B, #34 Pop). Not long after the legendary H-D-H team left Motown, they were joined by Bowen at their new company. Bowen discovered Jasmine through the drummer's father, the Detroit Symphony's 1st violinist - Felix Resnick, who at the time contracted and led many string sessions for Motown and Invictus. Bowen was impressed enough by Baldwin's band to arrange for Jasmine to rehearse with Ruth Copeland, a British singer/songwriter who was signed to Invictus. In June 1970, Donald and Ruth co-wrote "The Medal", the opening cut from Copeland's second Invictus LP, I Am What I Am, a recording that features Ruth, backed by the members of Funkadelic along with guitarist Ray Monette of Rare Earth. Within a few months, Baldwin signed a contract with Invictus Records (owned by Holland–Dozier–Holland)) and Gold Forever Music as an artist, songwriter, and arranger.

=== Ruth Copeland and Holland–Dozier–Holland ===
After several rehearsals, the original members of Funkadelic (Billy Bass Nelson, Eddie Hazel and Tiki Fulwood), along with current band member Bernie Worrell and future Funkadelic Ron Bykowski, began to gradually replace all of the members of Baldwin's band Jasmine, except for Baldwin himself. Soon after, this lineup started touring as Ruth Copeland's band. Funkadelic, were also backing up Parliament, another Invictus act at the time. In between Ruth's tour dates, Baldwin and the rest of the band would back up other Invictus acts locally, such as 100 Proof (Aged in Soul), The Jones Girls and Honey Cone. In late 1970, the group began backing Ruth exclusively, as they became the opening act for Sly and the Family Stone throughout 1971–1972, including a couple of gigs at Madison Square Garden.

In 1972, Baldwin wrote and conducted the rhythm, string, and horn arrangements for three tracks produced by Holland-Dozier-Holland on Freda Payne for her Reaching Out LP. One of the three, "Mother Misery's Favorite Child", was included on the Invictus Club Classics Vol II compilation CD; while another, "Two Wrongs Don't Make a Right", became a minor Rhythm and Blues (R&B) hit in the summer of 1973, peaking at #75. During the 2nd half of 1972, Ruth and her band opened several shows for Three Dog Night, as well as David Bowie, on the US leg of his Ziggy Stardust Tour, including the tour's initial gig in Cleveland and a well-publicized show at Carnegie Hall in NYC. It was around this time that Ruth Copeland split from her manager Jeffrey Bowen and began working with a new manager, Jeffrey Tofler. Soon after, Ruth and Co were once again opening gigs for Sly and the Family Stone. However, this new arrangement was quickly shut down, prompting Ruth to leave Invictus. Copeland eventually signed with RCA Records, working on material for a new album with Daryl Hall, once she had been released from her H-D-H contract. As a result, the band suddenly found themselves recording and touring with the chairman of the board, another Holland-Dozier-Holland/Invictus act.

Late in 1972, Jeffrey Bowen began producing the Skin I'm In album by the Chairmen of the Board in New York City. Baldwin and the previously mentioned members of Funkadelic participated in the sessions. Often referred to as "the lost Funkadelic album", Skin I'm In featured the hit-single "Finder's Keepers" (#7 R&B, #59 Pop) as well as the "Life 'n' Death suite" which has been described as a magnum opus based around a Sly Stone Track. Skin I'm In contained two Baldwin co-writes: "Morning Glory-White Rose" (co-written with Billy Bass Nelson and comprising two parts of the Life 'n' Death suite) and "Live With Me Love With Me" (co-written with Jeffrey Bowen and General Johnson). In the fall of 1973, the band (Baldwin, Bernie, Billy, Eddie, and Tiki) toured England with the Chairmen of the Board, where they received a hero's welcome. By the time the group left the UK, "Finders Keepers" was England's #1 hit.

=== Motown records ===
In 1974, Baldwin was signed to Motown Records and Jobete/Stone Diamond Music as an artist, songwriter, composer, and arranger. While in transition between HDH and Motown, Baldwin and Jeffery Bowen, as ghostwriters, co-wrote and arranged "I Feel Sanctified" for the Commodores debut album, Machine Gun. The recording, which featured Billy Bass Nelson and Eddie Hazel on bass and guitar respectively, became a significant R&B hit (#12 R&B, #75 Pop) in late 1974. As credited writers, producers, and arrangers, the team of Bowen and Baldwin had its first gold and platinum success with The Temptations album A Song For You (January 1975). Often credited with updating the Temptations Norman Whitfield sound, this #1 R&B LP (#13 Pop) featured Baldwin, as well as Funkadelics Nelson and Hazel as its musicians. The lead-off single, "Happy People" (co-written by Donald Baldwin-Jeffery Bowen-Lionel Richie), reached #1 on the R&B charts on 8 February 1975, and was the first of three top-40 pop hits culled from the LP. "Shakey Ground" (written by Eddie Hazel, Al Boyd, and Jeffrey Bowen) became the album's second single to reach #1 on the R&B chart (26 April 1975) and featured a soprano sax solo by Donald Baldwin. "Glasshouse" became the album's third Top-10 R&B single, as well as a top-10 hit on the Disco/Dance chart. In addition to co-writing "Happy People", Baldwin co-wrote the quiet storm classic "Memories" with Bowen and Kathy Wakefield, a song which features a standout lead vocal by Dennis Edwards.

Baldwin contributed to a variety of tracks produced by Jeffrey Bowen on several Motown artists for albums recorded and released between 1974 and 1980. These albums, for which Baldwin shared writers and/or performance/arranger credits were: Wings of Love by the Temptations (#3 R&B, #29 Pop); Rose Banks' (aka Rose Stone: Sly's sis and ex-Family Stone member) eponymous solo debut; Deep in My Soul by Smokey Robinson (#16 R&B, #47 Pop); as well as two self-titled albums by Bonnie Pointer (formerly of the Pointer Sisters): her 1978 solo debut (#34 R&B, #96 Pop) as well as her 1979 sophomore effort (#40 R&B, #63 Pop). During this time, Baldwin's co-writing credits included the following: "Mary Ann", "Dream World" and "Paradise" (all three written by Donald Baldwin, Jeffrey Bowen and Jimmy Ford); from The Temptations Wings of Love LP (March 1976); "You Cannot Laugh Alone" (another "quiet storm" classic) and "If You Want My Love" (both written by Baldwin and Bowen); featured on Smokey Robinson's Deep in My Soul LP (January 1977); "I Love to Sing to You", "I Wanna Make it in Your World", "More and More" and "My Everything" (all four by Baldwin and Bowen); from Bonnie Pointer's Red LP (October 1978); and one from Bonnie Pointer's Purple LP (November 1979) titled "Deep Inside My Soul" (by Donald Baldwin and Bonnie Pointer).

While with Motown, Baldwin worked on a number of unreleased recordings produced by Bowen on Marvin Gaye, Rose Banks, Jermaine Jackson, Diana Ross, Bonnie Pointer, and Cuba Gooding Sr (formerly of the Main Ingredient). The material intended for Marvin Gaye featured Baldwin along with Billy Bass Nelson, Eddie Hazel, Bernie Worrell, and drummer Ollie Brown. Baldwin left Motown around 1980 when his contract with the label expired.

=== As an independent artist ===
As an independent artist, Baldwin wrote and performed in numerous local bands throughout the Los Angeles area from 1981 through 1997. During this time, a third Bonnie Pointer album titled If The Price Is Right, (released in mid-1984 on the Private I label) featured a new composition by Baldwin and Bonnie Pointer titled "There's Nobody Quite Like You". A song titled "Xanadu II", originally written in 1976 by Baldwin and Emmy-nominated Frankie Blue, was used in 2001 as incidental background music in one of the episodes for The Huntress, a syndicated TV show (USA Network), that starred Annette O'Toole.

Baldwin remains musically active, working on a variety of projects including studio work by the Baldwin/Larsen Project and live work with the reggae artist Ras Michael and the Sons of Negus. Most recently, Baldwin worked with Tony Newton, the live and session bassist with Motown and founding member of the HDH/Invictus group 8th Day, on a DVD profiling Newton's musical career.
