= The Pointer Sisters (album) =

Studio album by the Pointer Sisters
- Released: May 26, 1973
- Studio: Wally Heider (San Francisco)
- Genre: R&B; soul; funk; jazz; pop
- Length: 46:47
- Label: Blue Thumb
- Producer: David Rubinson & Friends, Inc.

The Pointer Sisters chronology
The Pointer Sisters (1973)	That's a Plenty (1974)

Professional ratings
Review scores
Source	Rating
AllMusic	4/5 stars
Christgau's Record Guide	B

The Pointer Sisters is the debut studio album by the Pointer Sisters, released in 1973 on the Blue Thumb label.

== History ==
The album yielded the hits "Yes We Can Can" and "Wang Dang Doodle" and became a success based on word of mouth after heralded performances at The Troubadour in Los Angeles and on the Helen Reddy Show. The album peaked at number 13 on the Billboard 200 and reached number three on the R&B albums chart and was certified Gold by the Recording Industry Association of America in February 1974. The album was remastered and issued on CD in 2001 by MCA Records.

== Track listing ==
Side one
No.	Title	Writer(s)	Length
1.	"Yes We Can Can"	Allen Toussaint	6:02
2.	"Cloudburst"	Leroy Kirkland; Jimmy Harris	3:12
3.	"Jada"	Pointer Sisters; Bruce Good; Jeffrey Cohen	4:40
4.	"River Boulevard"	Barbara Mauritz	5:52
5.	"Old Songs"	John Shine; Bruce Good	4:01

Side two
No.	Title	Writer(s)	Length
6.	"That's How I Feel"	Wilton Felder	7:07
7.	"Sugar"	Pointer Sisters	2:19
8.	"Pains and Tears"	Norman Landsberg	2:36
9.	"Naked Foot"	Neal Tate	3:46
10.	"Wang Dang Doodle"	Willie Dixon	7:34

== Personnel ==
- Anita Pointer, Ruth Pointer, Bonnie Pointer, June Pointer – vocals
- Tom Salisbury – acoustic piano
- Norman Landsberg – acoustic piano on "Old Songs"
- Willie Fulton – electric guitars
- Ron McClure – acoustic bass, electric bass
- Rod Ellicott – bass on "River Boulevard"
- Gaylord Birch – drums
- Ed Marshall – drums on "Cloudburst" and "Jada"
- The Hoodoo Rhythm Devils – backing band on "Wang Dang Doodle"

Production

- David Rubinson & Friends, Inc. –producer, mix-down engineer
- Norman Landsberg – associate producer
- Fred Catero – recording engineer, mix-down engineer
- Jeremy Zatkin – recording engineer, mix-down engineer
- George Horne – mastering
- Herb Greene – portraiture, design

== Chart positions ==
Chart performance for The Pointer Sisters
Chart (1973)	Peak position
US Billboard 200	13
US Billboard Top R&B/Hip-Hop Albums	3

== Certifications ==
Certification for The Pointer Sisters
Region	Certification	Certified units/sales
United States (RIAA)	Gold	500,000^{^}
^{^} Shipments figures based on certification alone.
