= Charlemagne (songwriting team) =

American songwriting team

Charlemagne was a successful songwriting team made up of James Carmichael, Ronald Miller and Kathy Wakefield that worked for Motown in the 1970s. One of the many hits written by this team was “Glasshouse,” the last Top 40 Pop single by The Temptations.

== See also ==
- List of songwriter tandems
