= You Can't Hurry Love =

1966 single by the Supremes

- US single release

Single by the Supremes

from the album The Supremes A' Go-Go
- B-side: "Put Yourself in My Place"
- Released: July 25, 1966
- Recorded: June 11 and July 5, 1966
- Studio: Hitsville U.S.A. (Studio A)
- Genre: Pop; soul; R&B; Motown sound
- Length: 2:44
- Label: Motown; M 1097
- Songwriter: Holland–Dozier–Holland
- Producers: Brian Holland; Lamont Dozier

The Supremes singles chronology
| "Love Is Like an Itching in My Heart" (1966) | "You Can't Hurry Love" (1966) | "You Keep Me Hangin' On" (1966) |

The Supremes A' Go-Go track listing
- 12 tracks Side one: 1. "Love Is Like an Itching in My Heart"; 2. "This Old Heart of Mine (Is Weak for You)"; 3. "You Can't Hurry Love"; 4. "Shake Me, Wake Me (When It's Over)"; 5. "Baby I Need Your Loving"; 6. "These Boots Are Made for Walkin'"; Side two: 7. "I Can't Help Myself (Sugar Pie Honey Bunch)"; 8. "Get Ready"; 9. "Put Yourself in My Place"; 10. "Money (That's What I Want)"; 11. "Come and Get These Memories"; 12. "Hang On Sloopy"

"You Can't Hurry Love" is a song originally recorded by the Supremes on the Motown label. It was released on July 25, 1966 as the second single from their studio album The Supremes A' Go-Go.

Written and produced by Motown production team Holland–Dozier–Holland, the song topped the US Billboard Hot 100, made the top five in the UK, and top 10 in Australia. It was released and peaked in late summer and early autumn in 1966. Sixteen years later, Phil Collins re-recorded the song for his album Hello, I Must Be Going!. When released as a single it became a number one hit in the UK, staying there for two weeks beginning in January 1983, and reached number 10 on the US Billboard Hot 100 a month later.

Billboard named the song number 19 on their list of 100 Greatest Girl Group Songs of All Time. The BBC ranked "You Can't Hurry Love" at number 16 on The Top 100 Digital Motown Chart, which is based solely on all time UK downloads and streams of Motown releases.

== History ==
=== Overview ===
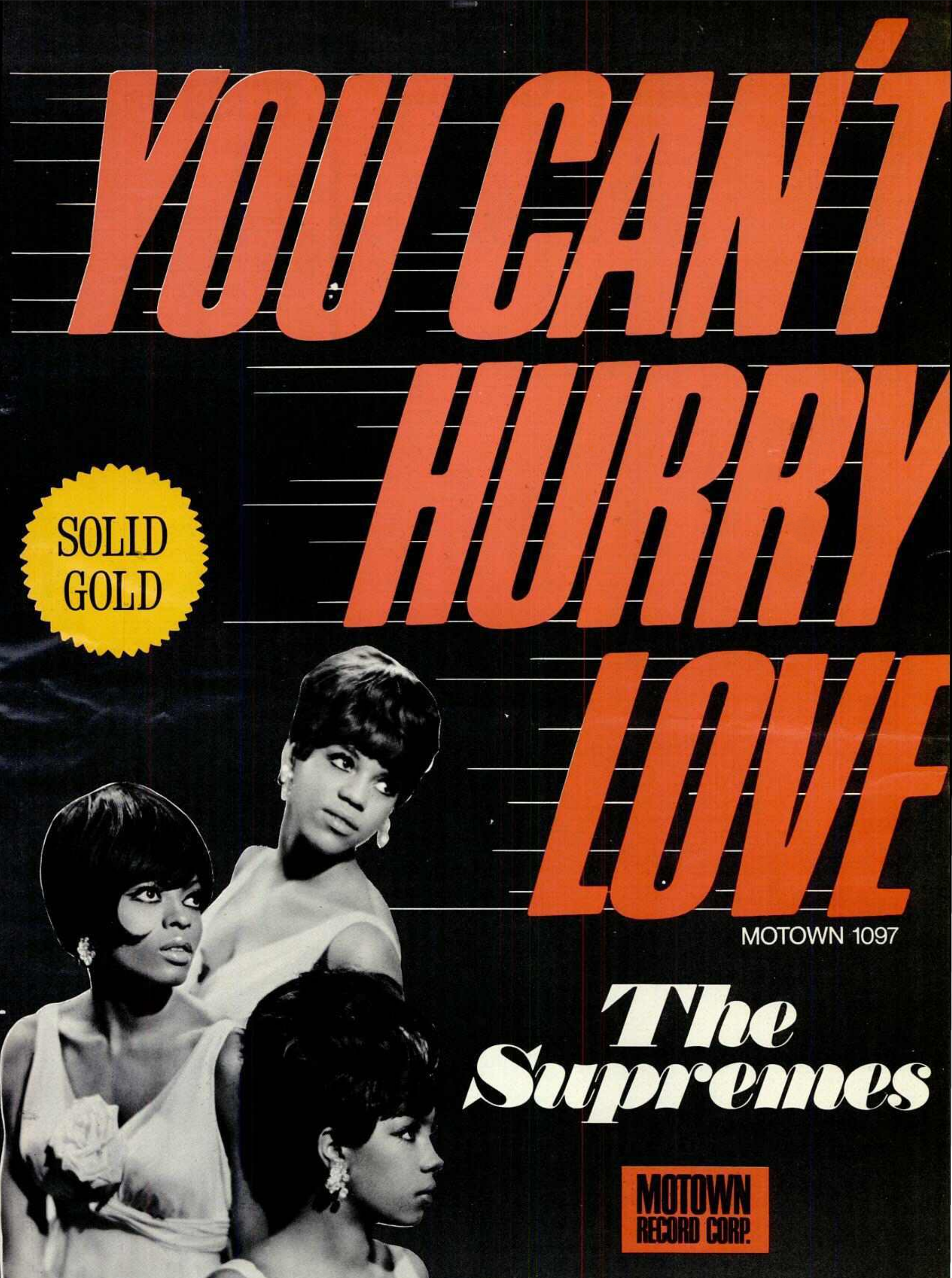
Billboard advertisement, August 13, 1966

The song "You Can't Hurry Love", a memory of a mother's words ("My mama said 'you can't hurry love/No you just have to wait'") telling her daughter that with patience she will find that special someone one day, was inspired by and partially based upon "(You Can't Hurry God) He's Right on Time" ("You can't hurry God/you just have to wait/Trust and give him time/no matter how long it takes"), a 1950s gospel song written by Dorothy Love Coates of the Original Gospel Harmonettes.

Written and produced by Motown's main production team, Holland–Dozier–Holland, "You Can't Hurry Love" is one of the signature Supremes songs, and also one of Motown's signature releases. Billboard described the single as "the group's most exciting side to date" with "top vocal" and "exceptional instrumental backing." Cash Box said that it is a "pulsating pop-r&b rhythmic ode which contends that romance is a slow-developing game of give-and-take." Record World called it "a wonderful and happy sounding tune, chirped by the Supremes, with bells and banjos."

The single was the Supremes' seventh number-one hit, topping the Billboard Hot 100 singles chart for two weeks, from September 4 to September 17, 1966, and reaching number one on the soul chart for two weeks. The group performed the song on the CBS variety program The Ed Sullivan Show on Sunday, September 25, 1966.

"You Can't Hurry Love" was the second single from the Supremes' album The Supremes A' Go-Go. It reached the number one position on the Billboard Hot 100 pop chart in the United States, and number three in the United Kingdom. The Supremes' version of the song is honored by inclusion in the Rock and Roll Hall of Fame's permanent collection of 500 Songs that Shaped Rock and Roll.

The Supremes also released a version sung in Italian: "L'amore verrà" ("Love Will Come").

== Personnel ==
- Lead vocals by Diana Ross
- Background vocals by Mary Wilson and Marlene Barrow
- Instrumentation by the Funk Brothers
  - Earl Van Dyke – piano
  - Robert White – guitar
  - James Jamerson – bass guitar
  - Benny Benjamin – drums
  - Jack Ashford – tambourine
- Written by Holland-Dozier-Holland

== Charts ==
=== Weekly charts ===
| Chart (1966) | Peak position |
|---|---|
| Australia (Billboard) | 9 |
| Australia (Go-Set) | 6 |
| Australia (Kent Music Report) | 10 |
| Canada (Billboard) | 1 |
| Canada Top Singles (RPM) | 3 |
| Netherlands (Dutch Top 40) | 24 |
| Singapore (Billboard) | 3 |
| UK Singles (Official Charts) | 3 |
| UK R&B (Record Mirror) | 1 |
| US Billboard Hot 100 | 1 |
| US Hot R&B/Hip-Hop Songs (Billboard) | 1 |
| US Cash Box Top 100 | 1 |
| US R&B Top 50 (Cash Box) | 1 |
| US Record World 100 Top Pops | 1 |
| US Record World Top 50 R&B | 1 |

=== Year-end charts ===
| Chart (1966) | Rank |
|---|---|
| Australia (Kent Music Report) | 90 |
| Japan Foreign Hits (Billboard) | 6 |
| UK Singles (OCC) | 55 |
| US Billboard Hot 100 | 13 |
| US Cash Box Top 100 | 5 |
| US R&B (Cash Box) | 21 |

=== Certifications ===
| Region | Certification | Certified units/sales |
|---|---|---|
| Denmark (IFPI Danmark) | Gold | 45,000^{‡} |
| Italy (FIMI) | Gold | 50,000^{‡} |
| New Zealand (RMNZ) | Platinum | 30,000^{‡} |
| Spain (Promusicae) | Gold | 30,000^{‡} |
| United Kingdom (BPI) Sales since 2004 | Platinum | 600,000^{‡} |
| United States | — | 1,000,000 |
^{‡} Sales+streaming figures based on certification alone.

== Phil Collins version ==
"You Can't Hurry Love"
- European and Australian picture sleeve

Single by Phil Collins

from the album Hello, I Must Be Going!
- B-side: "Do You Know, Do You Care?" (North America); "I Cannot Believe It's True" (international)
- Released: October 1982 (US); 19 November 1982 (UK)
- Recorded: May–June 1982
- Genre: Blue-eyed soul; R&B
- Length: 2:56
- Label: Virgin (UK); Atlantic (international)
- Songwriter: Holland–Dozier–Holland
- Producers: Phil Collins; Hugh Padgham

Phil Collins singles chronology
| "Thru These Walls" (1982) | "You Can't Hurry Love" (1982) | "I Don't Care Anymore" (1983) |

Music video
- "You Can't Hurry Love" on YouTube

Phil Collins' cover of the song was released in October 1982 as a single from his second solo album, Hello, I Must Be Going!. Collins' version became his first number one on the UK singles chart for two weeks in January 1983, peaking two positions higher than the original song did in the country, and reached number 10 in the United States (his first top 10 single in the US). The single was certified gold in the UK. The song spent a week at number one in Ireland in January 1983. The orchestral strings on this track were recorded in Studio 1 at CBS Recording Studios, London W1 by recording engineer Mike Ross-Trevor (assisted by Richard Hollywood) on the evening of June 24, 1982.

Collins said: "The idea of doing 'Can't Hurry Love' was to see if Hugh Padgham and I could duplicate that Sixties sound. It's very difficult today because most recording facilities are so much more sophisticated than they were back then. It's therefore hard to make the drums sound as rough as they did on the original. That's what we were going after, a remake, not an interpretation, but a remake."

In 1983, the music video was released on the home video Phil Collins, available on VHS and LaserDisc, which received a Grammy nomination for Best Video, Short Form at the 27th Annual Grammy Awards. The song itself was also the first track featured on the first release of the Now That's What I Call Music! compilation series.

=== Personnel ===
- Phil Collins – vocals, drums and tambourine
- Daryl Stuermer – guitars
- John Giblin – bass guitar
- J. Peter Robinson – piano, glockenspiel and vibraphone
- Strings arranged and conducted by Martyn Ford
- The Mountain Fjord Orchestra – strings

=== Charts ===
==== Weekly charts ====
| Chart (1982–1983) | Peak position |
|---|---|
| Australia (Kent Music Report) | 3 |
| Austrian Singles Chart | 3 |
| Belgium (Flanders) (Ultratop) | 1 |
| Canada (CHUM) | 1 |
| Canada Top Singles (RPM) | 9 |
| Dutch Top 40 | 1 |
| French Singles Chart | 13 |
| Germany (Media Control Charts) | 3 |
| Irish Singles Chart | 1 |
| New Zealand Singles Chart | 9 |
| South Africa (Springbok) | 9 |
| Spain (AFYVE) | 11 |
| Swedish Singles Chart | 6 |
| Swiss Singles Chart | 3 |
| UK Singles (OCC) | 1 |
| UK Airplay (Record Business) | 1 |
| US Billboard Hot 100 | 10 |
| US Adult Contemporary (Billboard) | 9 |

==== Year-end charts ====
| Chart (1982) | Rank |
|---|---|
| Canada (RPM) | 66 |

| Chart (1983) | Rank |
|---|---|
| Australia (Kent Music Report) | 21 |
| UK | 12 |
| US Billboard Hot 100 | 37 |
| US Cash Box Top 100 | 71 |

==== Certifications ====
| Region | Certification | Certified units/sales |
|---|---|---|
| Denmark (IFPI Danmark) | Platinum | 90,000^{‡} |
| Germany (BVMI) | Gold | 250,000^{‡} |
| Italy (FIMI) | Gold | 35,000^{‡} |
| Netherlands (NVPI) | Gold | 100,000^{^} |
| New Zealand (RMNZ) | 3× Platinum | 90,000^{‡} |
| Spain (Promusicae) | Platinum | 60,000^{‡} |
| United Kingdom (BPI) Physical | Gold | 500,000^{^} |
| United Kingdom (BPI) Digital | 2× Platinum | 1,200,000^{‡} |
^{^} Shipments figures based on certification alone.^{‡} Sales+streaming figures based on certification alone.

== Other notable cover versions ==
- The song was covered by the Dixie Chicks on the soundtrack to the 1999 film Runaway Bride. Their version peaked at number 60 on the Billboard Hot Country Singles & Tracks chart.

== See also ==
- List of Billboard Hot 100 number ones of 1966
