= Chris Clark (singer) =

American soul, jazz, and blues singer

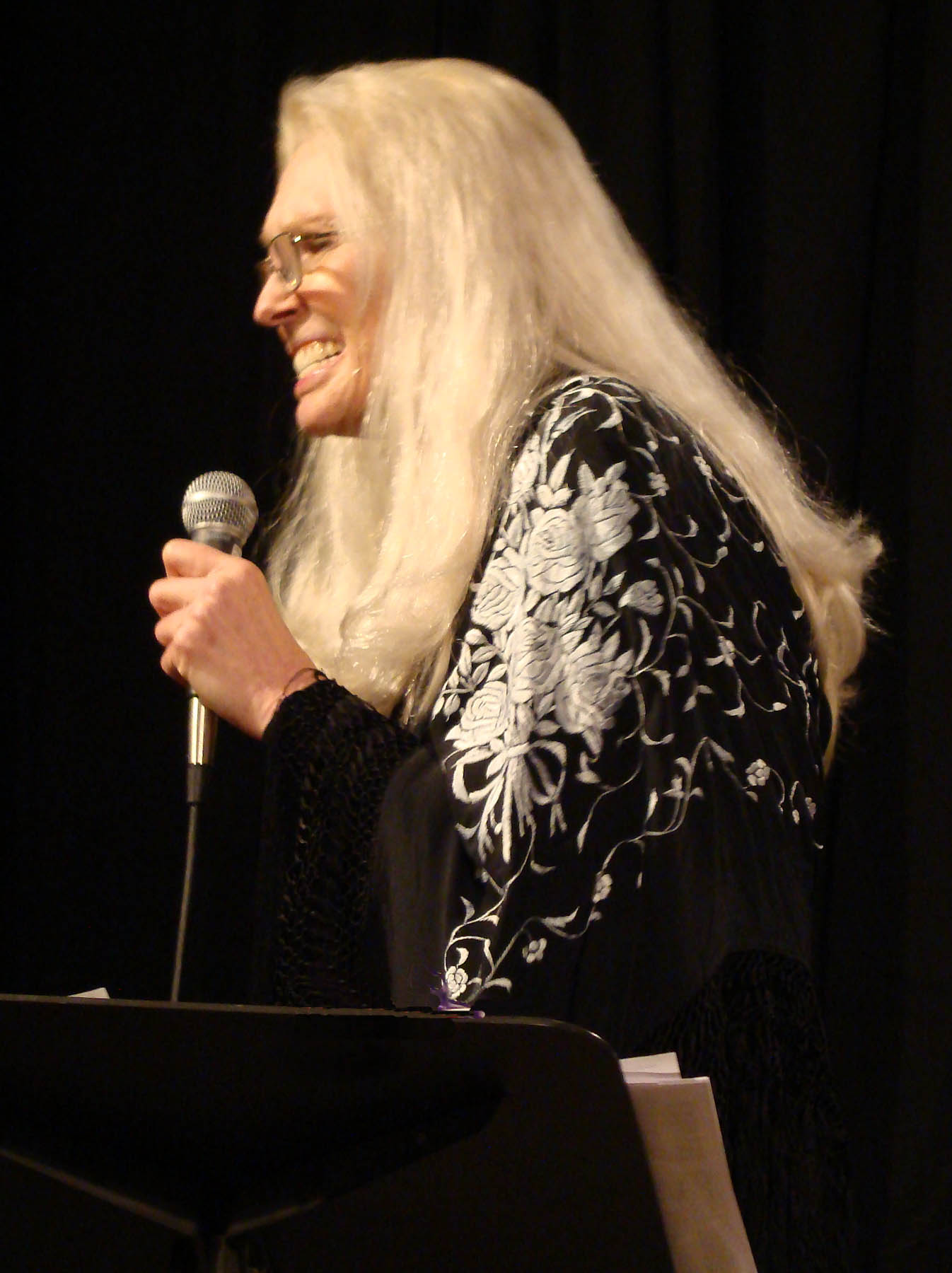
- Clark in 2009

Background information
- Born: Christine Elizabeth Clark; February 1, 1946 (age 80); Santa Cruz, California, U.S.
- Genres: Soul, R&B
- Occupation: Singer
- Labels: Motown, V.I.P., Weed
- Website: www.chrisclarkinc.com

Christine Elizabeth Clark (born February 1, 1946), better known as Chris Clark, is an American soul, jazz, and blues singer, who recorded for Motown Records. Clark became known to Northern soul fans for hit songs such as 1965's "Do Right Baby Do Right" (written by Berry Gordy) and 1966's "Love's Gone Bad" (Holland-Dozier-Holland). She later co-wrote the screenplay for the 1972 motion picture Lady Sings the Blues starring Diana Ross, which earned Clark an Academy Award nomination.

== Biography ==
Clark was born in Santa Cruz, California. Clark recorded a song on Motown's subsidiary label "V.I.P." with "Love's Gone Bad", which reached No. 105 Pop, and No. 41 R&B in the U.S. in 1966. In Canada, the song made it to No. 95 on the RPM 100. In 1967, Clark released her first album entitled Soul Sounds on the Motown label. The album featured twelve songs including a rare Motown ballad called "If You Should Walk Away" (Berry Gordy Jr.) which was slated for release as a single, but never was. Another notable recording was the 1967 UK single "I Want to Go Back There Again" (Berry Gordy, Jr). She recorded one more album for Motown on its newly created rock label Weed entitled CC Rides Again (1969). The Belgian label Marginal released a CD of Soul Sounds made from the original master tapes (with unaltered mixes) and it contains the songs from Soul Sounds, five songs from CC Rides Again and three unreleased singles. A 50-track double-CD from Universal Music was released in 2005 entitled Chris Clark: The Motown Collection and includes Soul Sounds, C.C. Rides Again, and many unreleased Motown recordings. A reissue and remastered version of the Soul Sounds album was released by the Reel Music label in April 2009, the first time the album was issued on CD in the US. Clark became famous in England as the "white negress" (a nickname meant as a compliment), because the six-foot platinum blonde, blue-eyed soul singer toured with fellow Motown artists, who were predominantly black.

Clark co-wrote the screenplay for the 1972 motion picture Lady Sings the Blues starring Diana Ross, which earned her an Academy Award nomination. During the early 1970s, she was a vice-president of Motown's Film and Television Production Division in Los Angeles. In 1975, Clark was the Creative Assistant for the motion picture Mahogany. Ultimately, Clark served as Head of Creative Affairs for Motown from 1981 to 1989. She left the employ of Motown at this time and went on to re-record "From Head to Toe" for Motorcity Records in 1991, under the production of Ian Levine.

Clark performed the song "The Ghosts of San Francisco", written by R. Christian Anderson and John Thomas Bullock, for the feature film When the World Came to San Francisco in 2015. The music video for the song was winner of the Mixed Genre Jazz Film Award at the New York Jazz Film Festival in November 2016. Clark currently lives in Santa Rosa, California, and continues to work as a screenwriter, fine art photographer and singer.

=== Marriage ===
In 1982, Clark married screenwriter and novelist Ernest Tidyman. She was his fourth wife. He died from complications from a perforated ulcer in 1984 in London.

== Selected discography ==
=== Releases on the Tamla/Motown label (UK) ===
- Soul Sounds – 1967 – 12" vinyl LP album
- CC Rides Again – 1969 – 12" vinyl LP album

=== Releases on the Tamla/Motown label (UK) ===
- Tamla/Motown TMG591: "Love's Gone Bad" / "Put Yourself in My Place" 7"
- Tamla/Motown TMG624: "From Head to Toe" / "The Beginning of the End" 7"
- Tamla/Motown TMG638: "I Want to Go Back There Again" / "I Love You" 7"
- Tamla/Motown TME2014: V/A: New Faces from Hitsville EP (inc. Chris Clark)

=== Releases on the V.I.P. label (US) ===
- "Do Right Baby, Do Right" / "Don't Be Too Long" – 1966 – 7"
- "Do I Love You (Indeed I Do)" / "Don't Be Too Long" – 1966 (cancelled)
- "Love's Gone Bad" / "Put Yourself in My Place" – 1966 – 7"
- "I Want to Go Back There Again" / "I Love You" – 1967 – 7"

=== Releases on the Motown label (US) ===
- Soul Sounds – 1967 (mono version) – 12" vinyl LP album
- Soul Sounds – 1967 (stereo version) – 12" vinyl LP album
- "From Head to Toe" / "Beginning of the End" – 1967 – 7"
- "Whisper You Love Me Boy" / "The Beginning of the End" – 1968 – 7"

=== Releases on the Weed label (US) ===
- CC Rides Again – 1969 (stereo only) – 12" vinyl LP album (with fold-out cover)

=== Released on Marginal Import (Belgium) ===
- Soul Sounds – 1997 (contains the complete Soul Sounds album, plus 5 songs from the C.C. Rides Again album, and 3 previously unreleased singles) – CD

=== Released on Universal UK (England) ===
- The Motown Collection – 2005 (contains both Soul Sounds and C.C. Rides Again plus 25 unreleased songs) – double CD

=== Released on Reel Music (US) ===
- Soul Sounds – 2009 (complete remastered album, plus alternate take of "Do Right Baby, Do Right")
- "Dream or Cry" – 4 December 2012 – three-track single
