= The Elgins =

American rhythm and blues group

- Origin: Detroit, Michigan, United States
- Genre: R&B
- Years active: 1965–1967 occasionally 1971–1990s
- Labels: V.I.P. Tamla Motown (UK); Motorcity
- Past members: Robert Fleming; Johnny Dawson; Cleo "Duke" Miller; Norman McLean; Saundra Mallett Edwards; Yvonne Vernee Allen; Jimmy Charles

The Elgins was an American vocal group on the Motown label, active from late 1965 until 1967. Its most successful record was "Heaven Must Have Sent You", written and produced by the Holland–Dozier–Holland team, which was a hit in the US in 1966, and in the UK when reissued in 1971.

== Career ==
Founding members Robert Fleming, Johnny Dawson, Cleo "Duke" Miller and Norman McLean recorded together for various small labels in Detroit prior to their Motown days, as the Sensations, the Five Emeralds, and the Downbeats, and also recorded as the Downbeats for Motown in 1962. The record company suggested that they add female lead vocalist Saundra Mallett, who had recorded unsuccessfully for the label, backed by the Vandellas; she later married and became Saundra Edwards. The new group's first single release was "Put Yourself In My Place", issued in December 1965; early copies credited the record to the Downbeats, but Berry Gordy wanted to use the name Elgins, which had previously been one of the names used by the Temptations. The record rose to no. 4 on the Billboard R&B chart and no. 72 on the Billboard Hot 100, and its B-side, "Darling Baby", also made the Hot 100. Several months later the group issued "Heaven Must Have Sent You", which again reached both the R&B and pop charts, was issued, and this became the group's biggest pop hit. The group also released an album, Darling Baby. However, the follow-up single, "I Understand My Man", was less successful, and the group broke up in 1967.

With the continuing popularity of Motown records in the UK fuelled by the Northern soul scene, "Heaven Must Have Sent You" was reissued in 1971 and peaked at No. 3 on the UK singles chart. "Put Yourself in My Place" was also reissued and made the chart. With Saundra Mallett Edwards being unwilling to rejoin the group, the Elgins toured the UK with former session vocalist Yvonne Vernee Allen taking her place. One of Yvonne Vernee's solo singles from the 1960s, "Just Like You Did Me", also became popular on the Northern soul scene, especially at Wigan Casino soul allnighters. Vernee also recorded some material with the Elgins at Motown, but none of it saw release. Bonnie Pointer recorded a hit version of "Heaven Must Have Sent You" in 1979; and, in 1989, Vernee, Dawson, McLean and Jimmy Charles recorded a new arrangement of the song in the style of Pointer's disco version for producer Ian Levine, which was released as a single that year. They made several further recordings for Levine's Motorcity label in the 1990s, and two albums, Take the Train (1990) and Sensational (1991), were released. A second single, "It's Sensational", was released in 1992, and a compilation album of the group's Motorcity material, The Best of the Elgins, was released in 1996. Saundra Edwards also made separate recordings for the same label. She died in February 2002.

A 1997 British import CD paired the album Darling Baby with one by the Monitors, another group that recorded for Motown with limited success, and which featured a future member of the Temptations, Richard Street. Recordings of the Elgins, including the group's Motown album, all the singles, and unreleased recordings up to 1968, can be found on The Motown Anthology, released in 2007.

Johnny Dawson died in September 2018. Norman McLean died on November 17, 2024.

== Discography ==
=== Albums ===
- 1966: Darling Baby (V.I.P. VM400)
- 1968: Darling Baby (UK issue) (Tamla Motown STML/TML11081)
- 1990: Take the Train (MOTCLP 39)
- 1991: Sensational (MOTCCD 75)
- 1996: The Best of the Elgins (HTCD 7733-2)
- 1997: The Elgins Meet the Monitors (UK issue) (Marginal ISO 9002)
- 2007: The Motown Anthology (UK issue) (Universal UK B000OONPO0)

=== Singles ===
| Year | A-side | B-side | Label | Chart positions | | | Certifications |
| Year | A-side | B-side | Label | US Pop | US R&B | UK | Certifications |
|---|---|---|---|---|---|---|---|
| 1965 | "Put Yourself in My Place" | "Darling Baby" | V.I.P. 25029; UK: Tamla Motown TMG551 | 72 / 92 | 4 / — | — | |
| 1966 | "Heaven Must Have Sent You" | "Stay in My Lonely Arms" | V.I.P. 25037; UK: Tamla Motown TMG583 | 50 | 9 | — | |
| 1967 | "I Understand My Man" | "It's Been a Long Long Time" | V.I.P. 25043; UK: Tamla Motown TMG615 | 92 | 35 | — | |
| 1968 | "Put Yourself in My Place" (reissue) | "Darling Baby" | UK: Tamla Motown TMG642 | — | — | — | |
| 1971 | "Heaven Must Have Sent You" (reissue) | "Stay in My Lonely Arms" | V.I.P. 25065; UK: Tamla Motown TMG771 | — | — | 3 | BPI: Silver |
| 1971 | "Put Yourself in My Place" (second reissue) | "It's Gonna Be Hard Times" | UK: Tamla Motown TMG787 | — | — | 28 | |
"—" denotes releases that did not chart or were not released in that territory.
