= Bonnie Pointer =

American singer and songwriter (1950–2020)

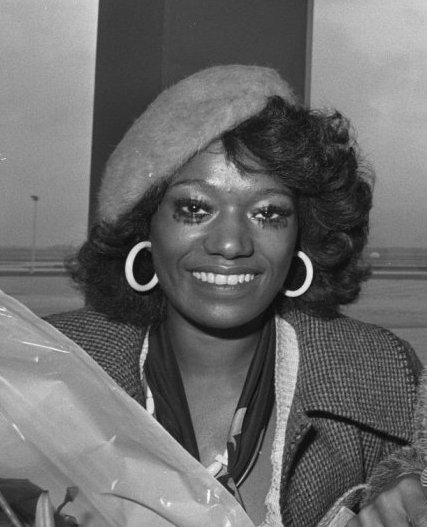
- Pointer in 1974

Background information
- Born: Patricia Eva Pointer; July 11, 1950; Oakland, California, U.S.
- Died: June 8, 2020 (aged 69) Los Angeles, California, U.S.
- Genres: Soul; R&B; disco; funk
- Occupations: Singer; songwriter
- Years active: 1969–2020
- Labels: Atlantic; Blue Thumb; ABC; Motown; Private I
- Formerly of: The Pointer Sisters

Patricia Eva "Bonnie" Pointer (July 11, 1950 – June 8, 2020) was an American singer and songwriter, best known as a founding member of the vocal group the Pointer Sisters. Pointer scored several moderate solo hits after leaving the Pointer Sisters in 1977, including a disco cover of the Elgins' "Heaven Must Have Sent You" which peaked at number 11 on September 1, 1979.

Born the third of four sisters, Pointer co-founded the Pointer Sisters in Oakland, California, in 1969, with the youngest sister, June. She established the group's trademark 1940s-influenced vocal style and fashion sense. The duo expanded to a trio then became a quartet after sisters Anita and Ruth joined. With Bonnie in the group, the Pointer Sisters recorded four studio albums and one live album from 1973 to 1977, earning two Gold record certifications in 1974 for The Pointer Sisters and That's a Plenty. Collaborating with Anita, Pointer co-wrote the songs "Fairytale" (1974) and "How Long (Betcha' Got a Chick on the Side)" (1975), the former winning the group the Grammy Award for Best Country Performance by a Duo or Group with Vocal.

Pointer left the group in 1977, signing to Motown Records. She recorded four solo albums from 1978 to 2011. Her first two albums, Bonnie Pointer (the red album, 1978) and Bonnie Pointer (the purple album, 1979), both hit the Top 40 on Billboard's R&B album chart, but her later albums did not chart. Her version of "Heaven Must Have Sent You" was a dance club hit in the US, Canada, Belgium, New Zealand, and especially in Mexico where it topped the pop chart in 1979. She was married to Motown producer Jeffrey Bowen from 1980 to 2016.

The Pointer Sisters continued without Bonnie to experience their greatest success in the 1980s under producer Richard Perry. Bonnie and Anita teamed up to write a few more songs together, and Bonnie joined her sisters for public events in 1994 and 1996. She appeared as herself in the 2010 film Road to Nowhere, and she was interviewed for the 2016 documentary Jewel's Catch One about the L.A. disco scene. Pointer's solo career tapered off after 1980, and she struggled with alcohol and drug addiction. She died at home of a heart attack on June 8, 2020.

== Career ==
Bonnie Pointer and her younger sister June began singing together in their father's West Oakland Church of God in Oakland, California. They were the first two of the sisters to pursue a professional career, the Pointers (otherwise known as the Pair) in 1969. After Anita joined the duo that same year, they changed their name to the Pointer Sisters and recorded several singles for Atlantic Records between 1971 and 1972. In December 1972, after several singles had been released, oldest sister Ruth wanted to join the group and afterwards, the four released their debut album as the Pointer Sisters in 1973. Their first album, The Pointer Sisters, yielded the hit "Yes We Can Can". Between 1973 and 1977, the Pointers donned 1940s fashions and sang in a style reminiscent of the Andrews Sisters. Their music included R&B, funk, rock and roll, gospel, country and soul.

Anita and Bonnie wrote the group's crossover country hit, "Fairytale", in 1974, which also became a Top 20 US pop hit and won the group their first Grammy for Best Vocal by a Duo or Group, Country. Anita and Bonnie also were nominated for Best Country Song at the same ceremony. In 1977, Bonnie left the group to begin a solo career. Ruth blamed Motown producer Jeffrey Bowen for romancing and enticing Bonnie away from the group; she wrote that Bowen had previously split up the Temptations in 1976 by luring Dennis Edwards into a failed solo effort. The remaining sisters continued performing as a trio, scoring hits from the late-1970s to the mid-1980s and had a major breakthrough with their 1983 album Break Out. In 1978, Bonnie Pointer signed with Motown Records and the same year, the label released "Heaven Must Have Sent You", which reached No. 11 on the US Billboard Hot 100 chart. Bonnie Pointer had a moderately successful solo career, though it never reached the heights of the Pointer Sisters. Pointer released three solo albums, two for Motown and one on Private I Records, before taking a hiatus from recording.

Reviewing her 1978 self-titled LP, Robert Christgau wrote in Christgau's Record Guide: Rock Albums of the Seventies (1981): "Thanks to (coproducer) Berry Gordy and the miracle of modern multitracking, Bonnie makes like the Marvelettes of your dreams for an entire side. People didn't conceive vocals this intricate and funky back in Motown's prime, much less overdub them single-larynxed, and the result is remakes that outdo the originals—by Brenda Holloway and the Elgins—and originals that stand alongside. The other side comprises originals of more diminutive stature cowritten by (coproducer) Jeffrey Bowen."

Pointer and her husband/producer Bowen failed to deliver a third album to Motown, and by 1981 they had harmed their industry reputation by defaulting on various hotel bills and agency fees. Motown executive Berry Gordy sued them in September 1981 for $6 million, citing extortion and physical threats in addition to the unfulfilled album contract. Pointer released her third album, If the Price Is Right, in 1984, for the independent label Private I. Two singles registered on the R&B chart: "Premonition" peaked at number 84 and "Your Touch" at number 35.

Also through Private I, Pointer recorded the song "The Beast in Me", produced by Gary Goetzman and Mike Piccirillo for the film Heavenly Bodies (1984). To promote the song, Pointer appeared on Soul Train on March 2, 1985, and was interviewed by Dick Clark on American Bandstand. The single peaked at number 87 in March 1985 on the R&B chart. She continued to perform, and reunited with her sisters on two occasions: first when the group received a star on the Hollywood Walk of Fame in 1994, and then during a Las Vegas performance in 1996 singing "Jump (for My Love)". At the beginning of 2008, she embarked on a European tour, and was working on her autobiography. Pointer performed at the Trump Taj Mahal in Atlantic City on October 25, 2008. Pointer portrayed herself in Monte Hellman's 2010 romantic thriller Road to Nowhere.

Pointer came out of retirement to record her fourth solo album, Like a Picasso, for songwriters and producers Lloyd Poe and Robin Taylor, the two billed as Taylor Poe. Starting in 2008, she first recorded their song "Answered Prayer" as a demo, and immediately phoned her sister Anita to join the project. Together, Bonnie and Anita recorded backing vocals for the album. The album took years to complete; it was finally released in 2011, but it failed in the marketplace because it was not promoted. Like a Picasso was rereleased in 2022 by Omnivore Recordings, and it was made available for online streaming.

== Personal life and death ==
In 1980, Pointer married Motown producer Jeffrey Bowen, after he co-produced her first two albums. Ruth Pointer wrote in her memoir, Still So Excited!: My Life as a Pointer Sister, that Bowen had been working to separate Bonnie from her sisters since 1977 when Bowen and Bonnie started a romantic relationship paired with drug abuse. Ruth wrote that Bowen was violent, controlling and manipulative, and that Bowen barred the sisters from talking to Bonnie after they married. Pointer and Bowen separated in 2004 after he started grooming a new singer girlfriend, then Pointer filed for divorce in 2014, which was finalized in 2016. She kept all of her song royalties as part of the divorce settlement.

She was arrested in 2011 for possession of crack cocaine. Following ten years of alcoholic liver disease and cirrhosis, Pointer died from cardiac arrest at her home in Los Angeles on June 8, 2020, at the age of 69. She was interred alongside June.

== Discography ==
=== Albums ===
Year	Title	Chart positions			
Year	Title	US	US R&B	CAN	AUS
1978	Bonnie Pointer (Red)	96	34	96	—
1979	Bonnie Pointer (Purple)	63	40	92	40
1984	If the Price Is Right	—	—	—	—
2011	Like a Picasso	—	—	—	—
"—" denotes releases that did not chart.

=== Singles ===
Year	Title	Chart positions						
Year	Title	US	US R&B	US Dance	US AC	CAN	UK	AUS
1978	"Free Me from My Freedom"	58	10	26	—	—	—	—
1978	"Tie Me to a Tree (Handcuff Me)"	—	10	26	—	—	—	—
1979	"Heaven Must Have Sent You"	11	52	8	43	32	—	31
1979	"Deep Inside My Soul"	—	—	—	—	—	—	—
1979	"I Can't Help Myself (Sugar Pie Honey Bunch)"	40	42	4	—	43	—	52
1984	"Your Touch"	—	35	64	—	—	79	—
1984	"Premonition"	—	84	—	—	—	—	—
1985	"The Beast in Me"	—	87	31	—	—	—	—
2010	"Strangest Day"	—	—	—	—	—	—	—
"—" denotes releases that did not chart or were not released in that territory.
