= Mother Dear =

Single by The Supremes

from the album More Hits by The Supremes
- B-side: "He Holds His Own"/"Who Could Ever Doubt My Love"
- Released: July 16, 1965 (withdrawn); July 23, 1965 (album); October 6, 1965 (withdrawn/canceled)
- Recorded: Hitsville U.S.A. (Studio A); June 2 and June 21, 1965
- Genre: Pop
- Length: 2:48
- Label: Motown; M 1080/1083
- Songwriter: Holland–Dozier–Holland
- Producers: Brian Holland; Lamont Dozier

The Supremes singles chronology
| "Back in My Arms Again" (1965) | "Mother Dear" (1965) | "I Hear a Symphony" (1965) |

"Mother Dear" is a 1965 song recorded by the Supremes for the Motown label.

Written and produced by Motown's main production team, Holland–Dozier–Holland, it was an unreleased single for More Hits by The Supremes; it was canceled in favor of the single "Nothing but Heartaches", as it was considered too lightweight to follow their previous single, "Back in My Arms Again". The label decided instead to release it as a follow-up single, but when "Nothing But Heartaches" failed to make it to the Top Ten, missing it by just one position and breaking the string of number-one Supremes hits, Motown chief Berry Gordy circulated a memo around the Motown offices that read as follows:

We will release nothing less than Top Ten product on any artist; and because the Supremes' world-wide acceptance is greater than the other artists, on them we will only release number-one records.

Thus the song was canceled a final time in favor of "I Hear a Symphony".

The song was re-recorded two more times with a second version recorded in the fall of 1965; possibly to be used as the single for its planned October release and then a third version in March 1966. The 1966 version was arranged differently from previous versions and used a syncopated clave rhythm arrangement best known as the Bo Diddley beat making the song more danceable. The second 1965 version was not released until 2012. An original 1966 stereo mix of the third version was not released until 2000. A new mix of the third version was released in 2017 containing elements edited out from the original 1966 mix.

The song was originally recorded as 'It's All Your Fault' in February 1965 which the song remained unreleased. Holland-Dozier-Holland rewrote the song into "Mother Dear" having the lyrics and parts of the melody changed. As an intended single release, The Supremes performed "Mother Dear on NBC-TV's The Dean Martin Show on a 1965 telecast. They also performed the song on CBS-TV's The Red Skelton Show.

== Version 1 Credits ==
- Lead vocals by Diana Ross
- Background vocals by Florence Ballard and Mary Wilson
- Instrumentation by the Funk Brothers

== Version 2 Credits ==
- Lead vocals by Diana Ross
- Background vocals by Florence Ballard and Mary Wilson
- Instrumentation by the Funk Brothers

== Version 3 Credits ==
- Lead vocals by Diana Ross
- Background vocals by Florence Ballard, Mary Wilson, and the Andantes
- Instrumentation by the Funk Brothers
