= Jeffrey Bowen =

American songwriter and record producer

- Origin: Detroit, Michigan, U.S.
- Genres: R&B; soul; disco
- Labels: Motown; Invictus; Hot Wax

Jeffrey Bowen is an American songwriter and record producer, notable for his work at both Motown Records and Holland-Dozier-Holland's Invictus and Hot Wax labels.

== Biography ==
He is best known for his work with the groups Chairmen of the Board, Commodores, DeBarge and the Temptations, and singers Rick James and Freda Payne. He wrote Marvin Gaye's song You. Bowen was first married to Ruth Copeland in the early 1970s. Bowen produced three albums for the Temptations: In a Mellow Mood (1967), A Song for You (1975), and Wings of Love (1976). In 1976, he requested Temptation Dennis Edwards to leave the Temptations and go solo, but however, Bowen had assigned all the leads to Edwards, and then this would make Bowen's last album with the Temptations.

Bowen met singer Bonnie Pointer, formerly of the Pointer Sisters, in 1978 and married her in 1980. He produced her 1978 and 1979 self-titled LPs for Motown (also known as the "red" and "purple" albums, respectively, because of their cover art) as well as her 1984 album If the Price Is Right for Private I Records. In July 2014, Pointer filed for divorce, which was finalized in 2016.
