= Holland–Dozier–Holland =

American songwriting and production team

- Origin: Detroit, Michigan, U.S.
- Genres: Motown sound; rhythm and blues; soul; funk
- Years active: 1962–1973; 2009
- Past members: Brian Holland; Lamont Dozier; Eddie Holland

Holland–Dozier–Holland, often abbreviated as H-D-H, are a songwriting and production team consisting of Lamont Dozier and brothers Brian and Eddie Holland. The trio wrote, arranged and produced 27 #1 hits for the Supremes, the Four Tops, Marvin Gaye, Smokey Robinson and the Miracles, Freda Payne, Junior Walker and the All Stars, and more. The songwriting team wrote 10 #1 hits for the Supremes. They have been credited for being the primary architects of the "Motown Sound". The trio wrote more than 95 Billboard Hot 100 songs.

In 1963, Holland–Dozier–Holland created hits for the Marvelettes ("Locking Up My Heart"), the Miracles ("Mickey’s Monkey"), Mary Wells ("You Lost the Sweetest Boy"), and Marvin Gaye ("Can I Get a Witness"), while achieving their 1st Top 10 pop success with Martha and the Vandellas' "Heat Wave." In 1964, the trio propelled one of Motown's newest artists, The Supremes, with their 1st #1 hit, and the first of their five consecutive chart-toppers, followed by "Baby Love", "Come See About Me", "Stop! In The Name of Love", and "Back In My Arms Again".

Holland–Dozier–Holland's work endures in the original recordings and many remakes by others, and some of their songs have become part of the Great American Songbook. The Rock & Roll Hall of Fame stated that "Motown as we know it would not exist without Holland–Dozier–Holland. Born and raised in Detroit, Holland–Dozier–Holland cranked out hits with the regularity of the auto plants they grew up surrounded by. Yet however machine-like they were in their songwriting, at the core of each hit is a throbbing, aching, unmistakably human heart."

From 1969 to 1972, due to a legal dispute with Motown, they did not write material under their own names, but instead used the collective pseudonym "Staff". When the trio left Motown, they continued to work as a production team (with Eddie Holland being added to the producer credits), and as a songwriting team, until 1973.

The trio was inducted into the Songwriters Hall of Fame in 1988 and the Rock and Roll Hall of Fame in 1990.

== History ==
Eddie Holland worked with Motown founder Berry Gordy before that label was formed; Eddie's 1958 Mercury Records single "You" was one of Gordy's earliest productions. Later, Eddie had a career as a Motown recording artist, scoring a US Top 30 hit in March 1962 with "Jamie". His brother, Brian Holland, was a Motown staff songwriter who also was a co-composer of the Marvelettes' US No. 1 song "Please Mr. Postman" in 1961. Lamont Dozier had been a recording artist in the late 1950s and early 1960s for labels including Anna Records, established by Gordy's sisters, Anna Gordy and Gwen Gordy.

The Holland brothers and Dozier (H-D-H) teamed up in 1962 to create material for both themselves and other artists, but soon found they preferred being writers and producers to being performers. Their hits from their early years together include timeless classics for Motown artists, such as "How Sweet It Is (To Be Loved by You)" for Marvin Gaye. They incorporated Holland–Dozier–Holland Productions (HDHP) in 1968.

=== Lawsuits and solo careers ===
In 1967, the three grew frustrated with their profit-sharing and royalty arrangements at Motown. After producing dozens of chart-topping hits for icons like The Supremes and Marvin Gaye, they staged a work slowdown and officially walked away from the label in early 1968. They started their own labels, Invictus Records and Hot Wax Records, which were modestly successful. When Motown sued for breach of contract, H-D-H countersued. The litigation was one of the longest legal battles in music industry history. Because they were legally contracted to Motown's publishing arm, Jobete, they could not use their own names on songs they wrote, and their material was credited to Wayne-Dunbar. Edith Wayne was a friend of the Holland family, and Ron Dunbar was an associate who was a songwriter and producer. The lawsuit was settled in 1977.

Dozier left HDHP in 1973 and resumed his career as a solo performing artist. In 1975, HDHP and Invictus Records sued Dozier and 31 others, claiming conspiracy to restrain trade and other charges. The suit was dismissed in 1982. From the mid-1970s onwards, HDHP, with Harold Beatty replacing Dozier, wrote and produced songs for various artists. HDHP's Motown artists in the 1970s included the Supremes and Michael Jackson, while its litigation against Motown was still pending. Dozier commented in 2008, "The lawsuit was just our way of taking care of business that needed to be taken care of – just like Berry Gordy had to take care of his business which resulted in the lawsuit. Business is business, love is love."

=== Later years ===
Dozier founded his own production company and continued to work as a solo artist, producer, and recording artist, while the Holland brothers continued to own HDH Records and Productions (without any participation from Dozier), which issues recordings from the Invictus and Hot Wax catalogs as well as new material. Dozier collaborated with Phil Collins on the song "Two Hearts", from the film Buster, which earned a Grammy Award, a Golden Globe Award, and a nomination for an Academy Award for Best Original Song.

More than three decades after their 1973 split, the Hollands and Dozier reunited after meeting with Creative Artists Agency's theatrical division co-founder and co-head, Michael Cardonick. The three signed with CAA. Their first project was writing the songs for the musical First Wives Club, based on the novel by Olivia Goldsmith and its film adaptation.

The musical includes 22 new songs from the songwriting trio. The producers hired Rupert Holmes, another Cardonick client, as bookwriter. The musical was produced by Paul Lambert and Jonas Neilson and premiered in July 2009 at the Old Globe Theatre in San Diego, California. Despite strong ticket sales, reviews were mixed to negative, and the producers decided to rework the book.

The First Wives Club, with an entirely new book written by Linda Bloodworth-Thomason, played in Chicago beginning on February 16, 2015. The musical now included a sprinkling of classic H-D-H songs (including "Stop! In the Name of Love" and "My World Is Empty Without You"), interspersed with the new material. It was intended that the production would head to Broadway in late 2015, but the critical reception for this production was lukewarm to negative, and it did not transfer to Broadway.

== Legacy ==
In 1998, the Recording Academy's National Trustees recognized Lamont Dozier, Eddie Holland, and Brian Holland with the Grammy Trustees Award for people who, during their careers in music, have made significant contributions, other than performance, to the field of recording. As longtime BMI songwriters, Brian Holland affiliated with the performing rights organization in 1960, followed by Lamont Dozier in 1961 and Eddie Holland in 1963. They have won BMI Awards including BMI Pop Awards and Million-Air citations. On May 13, 2003, Holland–Dozier–Holland were honored as BMI Icons at the 51st BMI Pop Awards.

Holland–Dozier–Holland are mentioned (along with the Four Tops and their vocalist Levi Stubbs, as well as Norman Whitfield and Barrett Strong) in the lyrics of the song "Levi Stubbs' Tears" from the 1986 Billy Bragg album Talking with the Taxman about Poetry; and also in the lyrics of the Magnetic Fields' song "The Death of Ferdinand de Saussure", from their 1999 album 69 Love Songs.

Brian Holland, Lamont Dozier, and Eddie Holland were inducted into the Michigan Rock and Roll Legends Hall of Fame in 2010.

== Discography ==
=== Production ===
Year	Song title	Original artists	Covering artists
1962	"Dearest One"	Lamont Dozier	
1962	"Old Love (Let's Try It Again)"	Mary Wells	Martha and the Vandellas, Four Tops
1962	"Darling, I Hum Our Song"	Eddie Holland	Martha and the Vandellas, Four Tops
1963	"Leaving Here"	Eddie Holland	Motörhead, Lars Frederiksen and the Bastards, Pearl Jam, The Birds, The Who, Brownsville Station, The Gories, The Messengers, The Rationals, and The Volts
1963	"Locking Up My Heart"	The Marvelettes	
1963	"What Goes Up Must Come Down" / "Come on Home"	Holland & Dozier	
1963	"Tie a String Around Your Finger"	The Marvelettes	
1963	"Come and Get These Memories" / "Jealous Lover"	Martha and the Vandellas	Hattie Littles, Anna King, The Supremes
1963	"You Lost the Sweetest Boy"	Mary Wells	Dusty Springfield
1963	"Heat Wave" / "A Love Like Yours (Don't Come Knocking Everyday)"	Martha and the Vandellas	The Who, Linda Ronstadt and The Jam / Dusty Springfield, Juice Newton, Ike & Tina Turner and The Animals, Phil Collins, Joan Osborne
1963	"(He Won't Be True) Little Girl Blue"	The Marvelettes	
1963	"Mickey's Monkey"	The Miracles	Martha and the Vandellas, The Hollies, The Young Rascals, John Mellencamp, Mother's Finest
1963	"Too Hurt to Cry, Too Much in Love to Say Goodbye" / "Come on Home"	Gladys Horton & The Andantes (credited as The Darnells.)	The Supremes
1963	"When the Lovelight Starts Shining Through His Eyes" / "Standing at the Crossroads of Love"	The Supremes	Dusty Springfield, The Zombies, Bonnie Pointer
1963	"I Gotta Dance to Keep From Crying"	The Miracles	The High Numbers
1963	"Quicksand" / "Darling I Hum Our Song"	Martha and the Vandellas	
1963	"Live Wire" / "Old Love (Let's Try It Again)"	Martha and the Vandellas	
1963	"Run, Run, Run" / "I'm Giving You Your Freedom"	The Supremes	
1963	"Can I Get a Witness"	Marvin Gaye	Dusty Springfield, The Rolling Stones, Sam Brown, The Steampacket, Lee Michaels, The Temptations, The Supremes, Z. Z. Hill
1964	"A Tear from a Woman's Eyes" (non-single release; competed with "The Way You Do the Things You Do" for a spot on The Temptations' 7th single.)	The Temptations	
1964	"My Lady Bug Stay Away from That Beatle" (never released)	R. Dean Taylor	
1964	"Like a Nightmare" / "If You Were Mine"	The Andantes	
1964	"In My Lonely Room"	Martha and the Vandellas	The Supremes, The Action
1964	"Just Ain't Enough Love"	Eddie Holland	The Isley Brothers
1964	"Where Did Our Love Go"	The Supremes	Adam Ant, Soft Cell, Pussycat Dolls, Three Ounces of Love, The J. Geils Band, Donnie Elbert, The Manhattan Transfer
1964	"Baby Don't You Do It"	Marvin Gaye	Small Faces, The Who, The Black Crowes, The Band, The Poets
1964	"Guarantee (For a Lifetime)" (never released)	Mary Wells	
1964	"Baby I Need Your Loving" / "Call on Me"	Four Tops	Johnny Rivers, Eric Carmen, The Supremes, Marvin Gaye & Tammi Terrell, and Joe Stubbs / Shorty Long
1964	"Candy to Me" / "If You Don't Want My Love"	Eddie Holland	Martha and the Vandellas, Four Tops
1964	"Whisper You Love Me Boy" (never released)	Mary Wells	The Supremes, Chris Clark
1964	"Baby Love" / "Ask Any Girl"	The Supremes	Royal Philharmonic Orchestra, Tony Martin
1964	"Come See About Me" / "(You're Gone But) Always in My Heart"	The Supremes	The Afghan Whigs, Barbara Mason, Jr. Walker & the All Stars, Choker Campbell and Pat Lewis, Bonnie Pointer, Yo La Tengo, Mark Farner & Don Brewer
1964	"Without the One You Love (Life's Not Worth While)" / "Love has Gone"	Four Tops	The Supremes & Four Tops
1964	"You're a Wonderful One"	Marvin Gaye	Don Bryant, Art Garfunkel
1964	"How Sweet It Is (To Be Loved by You)"	Marvin Gaye	Jr. Walker & the All-Stars, The Elgins, James Taylor, Grateful Dead, Joan Osborne, Liz Lands, Ruby Turner, Michael Bublé
1965	"Where Did You Go"	Four Tops	
1965	"Stop! In the Name of Love" / "I'm in Love Again"	The Supremes	The Hollies, Talas, Kim Weston, Gloria Gaynor, Jonell Mosser
1965	"You've Been a Long Time Coming"	Marvin Gaye	
1965	"Who Could Ever Doubt My Love" (non-single release; album-track only)	Brenda Holloway	The Supremes, The Isley Brothers
1965	"Nowhere to Run"	Martha and the Vandellas	Hattie Littles, The Messengers, Tower of Power, Bonnie Pointer, Ruby Turner, Laura Nyro & Labelle
1965	"Back in My Arms Again" / "Whisper You Love Me Boy"	The Supremes	Genya Ravan, High Inergy
1965	"I Can't Help Myself (Sugar Pie, Honey Bunch)"	Four Tops	The Supremes, Gloria Lynne, Bonnie Pointer, Robert Parker, Johnny Rivers, and Axe
1965	"The Only Time I'm Happy" (limited promo-only single release)	The Supremes	
1965	"Mother Dear" (cancelled single release) / "He Holds His Own"	The Supremes	
1965	"Nothing but Heartaches" / "He Holds His Own"	The Supremes	
1965	"Love (Makes Me Do Foolish Things)"	Martha and the Vandellas	The Supremes
1965	"It's the Same Old Song" / "Your Love Is Amazing"	Four Tops	The Supremes, KC and the Sunshine Band and Joe Stubbs
1965	"Mother Dear" (cancelled single release) / "Who Could Ever Doubt My Love"	The Supremes	
1965	"I Hear a Symphony" / "Who Could Ever Doubt My Love"	The Supremes	Stevie Wonder, The Isley Brothers and The Temptations, Royal Philharmonic Orchestra
1965	"Something About You"	Four Tops	Sisters Love, Byron Lee and the Dragonaires
1965	"Take Me in Your Arms (Rock Me a Little While)"	Eddie Holland	The Isley Brothers, Kim Weston, Mother Earth, Jermaine Jackson, The Doobie Brothers, and Blood, Sweat & Tears
1965	"Darling Baby"	The Elgins	Rose Banks; Jackie Moore
1966	"There's a Ghost in My House"	R. Dean Taylor	The Fall
1966	"(I'm a) Road Runner"	Jr. Walker & the All-Stars	Fleetwood Mac, Steppenwolf, Humble Pie, Peter Frampton, James Taylor, and Jerry Garcia
1966	"This Old Heart of Mine (Is Weak for You)"	The Isley Brothers	The Supremes, Ronald Isley, Rod Stewart, Tammi Terrell, Byron Lee and the Dragonaires and The Contours
1966	"Ask Any Man"	Tony Martin	
1966	"My World Is Empty Without You"	The Supremes	Mary Wilson, Della Reese, Diamanda Galás, The Afghan Whigs, Blackjack, Barbara McNair
1966	"Put Yourself in My Place"	The Elgins	The Supremes, Byron Lee and the Dragonaires
1966	"There's No Love Left"	The Isley Brothers	
1966	"Shake Me, Wake Me (When It's Over)" / "Just as Long as You Need Me"	Four Tops	The Hollies, Barbra Streisand
1966	"Helpless" / "A Love Like Yours (Don't Come Knocking Everyday)"	Kim Weston	
1966	"Call on Me"	Shorty Long	
1966	"Love Is Like an Itching in My Heart" / "He's All I Got"	The Supremes	
1966	"Who Could Ever Doubt My Love"	The Isley Brothers	
1966	"I Like Everything About You"	Four Tops	
1966	"I Guess I'll Always Love You"	The Isley Brothers	The Supremes
1966	"Nothing but Soul"	Jr. Walker & the All-Stars	
1966	"Love's Gone Bad" / "Put Yourself in My Place"	Chris Clark	
1966	"You Can't Hurry Love" / "Put Yourself in My Place"	The Supremes	Phil Collins, Stray Cats, Dixie Chicks
1966	"Little Darling (I Need You)"	Marvin Gaye	The Doobie Brothers
1966	"Reach Out I'll Be There" / "Until You Love Someone"	Four Tops	Diana Ross, Thelma Houston, Michael Bolton, Gloria Gaynor, Bobby Taylor & the Vancouvers and Snuff
1966	"Stay in My Lonely Arms"	The Elgins	Diana Ross & the Supremes, Four Tops
1966	"You Keep Me Hangin' On" / "I Wanna Mother You, Smother You with Love" (cancelled single release)	The Supremes	
1966	"You Keep Me Hangin' On" / "Remove This Doubt"	The Supremes	Vanilla Fudge, Rod Stewart, Kim Wilde, Rose Banks, Wilson Pickett, Reba McEntire, Mary Wilson
1966	"Standing in the Shadows of Love" / "Since You've Been Gone"	Four Tops	The Jackson 5, Joe Stubbs, Rod Stewart, Barry White and Snuff
1966	"I'm Ready for Love"	Martha and the Vandellas	The Temptations, June Pointer, High Inergy
1966	"(Come 'Round Here) I'm the One You Need"	The Miracles	The Jackson 5, The Cowsills, The GP's
1966	"Heaven Must Have Sent You"	The Elgins	Diana Ross & the Supremes, Bonnie Pointer
1967	"Just One Last Look" (non-single release; album-track only)	Four Tops	The Temptations
1967	"Love Is Here and Now You're Gone" / "There's No Stopping Us Now"	The Supremes	Michael Jackson
1967	"Your Love Is Amazing"	Shorty Long	Byron Lee and the Dragonaires
1967	"Jimmy Mack" / "Third Finger, Left Hand"	Martha and the Vandellas	James Brown, Laura Nyro & Labelle, Bettye LaVette, Sheena Easton, Lani Hall, Bonnie Pointer
1967	"Bernadette" / "I Got a Feeling "	Four Tops	
1967	"My World Is Empty Without You"	Barbara McNair	Cover of The Supremes
1967	"The Happening" / "All I Know About You"	The Supremes	Herb Alpert & the Tijuana Brass
1967	"Just Ain't Enough Love"	The Isley Brothers	
1967	"7-Rooms of Gloom" / "I'll Turn to Stone"	Four Tops	Blondie, Pat Benatar
1967	"I Understand My Man"	The Elgins	
1967	"Your Unchanging Love" / "I'll Take Care of You"	Marvin Gaye	
1967	"Reflections" / "Going Down for the Third Time"	Diana Ross & the Supremes	Syreeta, Four Tops, The Temptations, Michael McDonald, Sweet, Luther Vandross
1967	"One Way Out"	Martha and the Vandellas	
1967	"You Keep Me Running Away" / "If You Don't Want My Love"	Four Tops	
1967	"I Got a Feeling"	Barbara Randolph	
1967	"In and Out of Love" / "I Guess I'll Always Love You"	Diana Ross & the Supremes	
1968	"Whisper You Love Me Boy"	Chris Clark	
1968	"Forever Came Today"	Diana Ross & the Supremes	The Jackson 5, Commodores
1968	"I'm in a Different World"	Four Tops	
1969	"We've Got a Way Out Love"	The Originals	
1969	"Crumbs off the Table" (HDH as "Edythe Wayne")	The Glass House	Laura Lee
1969	"While You're Out Looking For Sugar" (HDH as "Edythe Wayne")	Honey Cone	
1969	"Girls It Ain't Easy (HDH as "Edythe Wayne")	Honey Cone	
1970	"Give Me Just a Little More Time" (HDH as "Edythe Wayne")	Chairmen of the Board	Angela Clemmons, Kylie Minogue
1970	"(You've Got Me) Dangling on a String" (HDH as "Edythe Wayne")	Chairmen of the Board	
1970	"Band of Gold" (HDH as "Edythe Wayne")	Freda Payne	Sylvester, Charly McClain, Belinda Carlisle, Bonnie Tyler and Kimberley Locke
1970	"Westbound #9" (HDH as "Edythe Wayne")	The Flaming Ember	
1972	"The Day I Found Myself" (HDH as "Edythe Wayne")	Honey Cone	
1972	"Don't Leave Me Starvin' For Your Love"	Holland–Dozier–Holland	Laura Lee
1972	"Why Can't We Be Lovers"	Holland–Dozier–Holland	
1973	"You're Gonna Need Me"	Dionne Warwick	

=== Holland brothers without Dozier ===
Year	Song title	Artist
1975	"We're Almost There"	Michael Jackson
1975	"Just a Little Bit of You"	Michael Jackson
1975	"Early Morning Love"	The Supremes
1975	"Where Do I Go from Here"	The Supremes
1976	"I'm Gonna Let My Heart Do the Walking"	The Supremes
1976	"High Energy"	The Supremes
1976	"Let Yourself Go"	The Supremes
1982	"We Can Never Light That Old Flame Again"	Diana Ross

=== Billboard Top Ten hit songs (US pop chart) ===
Year	Song title	US	Artist
1963	"Heat Wave"	4	Martha and the Vandellas
1963	"Mickey's Monkey"	8	The Miracles
1963	"Quicksand"	8	Martha and the Vandellas
1964	"Where Did Our Love Go"	1	The Supremes
1964	"Baby Love"	1	The Supremes
1964	"Come See About Me"	1	The Supremes
1964	"How Sweet It Is (To Be Loved by You)"	6	Marvin Gaye
1965	"Stop! In the Name of Love"	1	The Supremes
1965	"Nowhere to Run"	8	Martha and the Vandellas
1965	"Back in My Arms Again"	1	The Supremes
1965	"I Can't Help Myself (Sugar Pie Honey Bunch)"	1	Four Tops
1965	"It's the Same Old Song"	5	Four Tops
1965	"I Hear a Symphony"	1	The Supremes
1966	"My World Is Empty Without You"	5	The Supremes
1966	"Love Is Like an Itching in My Heart"	9	The Supremes
1966	"You Can't Hurry Love"	1	The Supremes
1966	"Reach Out I'll Be There"	1	Four Tops
1966	"You Keep Me Hangin' On"	1	The Supremes
1966	"Standing in the Shadows of Love"	6	Four Tops
1966	"I'm Ready for Love"	9	Martha and the Vandellas
1967	"Love Is Here and Now You're Gone"	1	The Supremes
1967	"Baby I Need Your Loving"	3	Johnny Rivers
1967	"Jimmy Mack"	10	Martha and the Vandellas
1967	"Bernadette"	4	Four Tops
1967	"The Happening"	1	The Supremes
1967	"Reflections"	2	The Supremes
1967	"In and Out of Love"	9	The Supremes
1968	"You Keep Me Hangin' On"	6	Vanilla Fudge
1970	"Give Me Just a Little More Time"	3	Chairmen of the Board
1970	"Band of Gold"	3	Freda Payne
1975	"How Sweet It Is (To Be Loved by You)"	5	James Taylor
1975	"(Love Is Like a) Heat Wave"	5	Linda Ronstadt
1982	"You Can't Hurry Love"	10	Phil Collins
1987	"You Keep Me Hangin' On"	1	Kim Wilde
1990	"This Old Heart of Mine"	10	Rod Stewart with Ronald Isley
