= Denver Taiko =

American taiko group

- Origin: Denver, Taiko
- Genres: North American Taiko drums, percussion ensemble
- Years active: 1976–present
- Website: www.denvertaiko.org

Denver Taiko is the fourth taiko group founded in North America and the first taiko ensemble outside of California, United States. The group has a close partnership with the Tri-State Denver Buddhist Temple and performs throughout Colorado and neighboring states. In 2001, Denver Taiko received the Excellence in the Arts Award from Denver Mayor Wellington Webb. Today, Denver Taiko is an ensemble of third, fourth, and fifth generation Japanese Americans with a shared interest in honoring their Japanese American cultural heritage.

== Early history ==
Denver Taiko was the fourth seminal taiko group in North America. Many of the original members were University of Colorado Boulder alumni, and most of the group's original founders worked with the Community Action Research Program (CARP) in Denver. One of CARP's members, Mark Miyoshi had met with San Jose Taiko, the third taiko group founded in North America, and was impressed with San Jose Taiko's presentation of taiko. The members of San Jose Taiko taught Mark Miyoshi a fundamental taiko piece written by Seiichi Tanaka Sensei titled "Renshu," and gave him instructions or building taiko drums.

In the fall of 1975, Mark Miyoshi met with six friends to learn Renshu and to try taiko drumming for the first time. The original members of Denver Taiko included Joyce Masunaga, Mark Miyoshi, Naomi Nakano, Joyce Nakata, Nancy Ozaki, Elaine Takahashi, and Sue Taoka.

In January 1976, Tri-State Denver Buddhist Temple, a member of the Buddhist Churches of America, welcomed the taiko group to its current location.

In May 1976, the San Francisco Taiko Dojo accompanied a Koto performing group at a concert in Denver. The local taiko members asked Seiichi Tanaka Sensei to give the Denver members a workshop that included his philosophy of taiko, aspects of respect, the importance of ki (centering and spirit) and kata (technique). Additionally, he taught the group Matsuri Taiko and encouraged the group to compose their own songs and to perform in public.

Three months later in August 1976, members of Kinnara Taiko from Los Angeles led another workshop for Denver Taiko. Reverend Masao Kodani, Kinnara's founder, led a seminar that emphasized the Buddhist perspective of taiko.

In July 1976, the group performed in their first Obon festival. By that time, the group made four more drums and made their first set of happi, obi, and hachimaki. As they performed their two-song repertoire, they were introducing a traditional art form that had been missing from the Denver Obon for decades.

In the subsequent years, the group continued to develop their technique and repertoire. Members went to visit other taiko groups and performers such as San Jose Taiko and Roy Hirabayashi to bring back new ideas for performing and rehearsing. The group has also hosted taiko groups and solo performers such as Oedo Sukeroku, On Ensemble, TaikoProject and Kenny Endo.

== Equipment ==
Mark Miyoshi, one of Denver Taiko's founders, led the process for the group's first homemade drum. The group has also received drums as gifts from Osuwa Daiko and the Ogden Taiko Group.

== Tri-State Denver Buddhist Temple ==
Denver Taiko has had a strong relationship with the Tri-State Denver Buddhist Temple since the group relocated to the temple in 1976. In the first years of the group, nearly 80% of the group's musicians were also members of the Denver Buddhist Temple. The temple provided storage and practice facilities for the ensemble and Denver Taiko served as an effective method for spreading interest in the Denver Buddhist Temple, Jodo Shinshu Buddhism, and Japanese American culture.

== Organization and Rehearsals ==
Denver Taiko uses a consensus-based system, and members select two practice leaders who lead rehearsals for one month at a time before turning over the responsibility to another pair of members. Joyce Kim served as the group's primary leader starting in 1976, and Aiko Kimura took over Kim's role in 1986.

In 2011, Denver Taiko became a 501(c)(3) non-profit organization. Today, the group has a board of non-taiko members and appointed Denver Taiko members officers that help with team logistics such as maintaining equipment, tracking finances, and arranging performances.

== Influences ==
In 1978, Seiichi Tanaka, of San Francisco Taiko Dojo, came to Denver to offer the group a workshop on form and stance. Kinnara Taiko from Los Angeles has taught Denver Taiko a piece and shared the Buddhist philosophy in respect to taiko. San Jose Taiko was instrumental in the group's organization and code of ethics. On Ensemble, Yoshikazu Fujimoto and Yoko Fujimoto of Kodo have been influential in the group's musical development. Still, Denver Taiko prided itself on being a largely self-taught group. Today, a third of the pieces that Denver Taiko performs regularly are adapted from pieces that other groups play. The remaining two thirds, are original compositions.

In 1984 Denver Taiko went on a two-week tour to Japan to visit a number of ensembles including Kodo, Gojingo, Tenri; and Oedo Sukeroku. This was an opportunity to not only meed and learn from a few of the prominent taiko groups in Japan, but for most Denver Taiko members, it was the first visit to their ancestral homeland.

During the summer of 2003, the Consulate General of Japan in Denver sponsored a three-week workshop to celebrate 150 years of US-Japan relations. Denver Taiko and the Consulate invited Sensei Yoichi Watanabe, the leader of Amanojaku, and his student protégé, Isaku Kageyama, to lead a series of community outreach events at local elementary schools before leading a four-day workshop for Denver Taiko.

== Performances ==
Denver Taiko primarily performs in the greater Metropolitan Denver area and surrounding cities. Most of the nearly 40 performances a year are for festivals and schools. During the 1980s the group performed several times at Japanese festivals in Albuquerque, New Mexico and St. Louis, Missouri. In 2000, Denver Taiko performed at Red Rocks Amphitheatre in Morrison, Colorado before the opening of the film Crouching Tiger, Hidden Dragon. In 2005, Denver Taiko was invited to perform at the funeral for the American journalist and author, Hunter S Thompson. The group performs full concerts every two or three years, and they host a special anniversary concert every five years.

== Japan Relief ==
Shortly after the March 11, 2011 earthquake and tsunami in northern Japan, Denver Taiko, along with two other local groups, Mirai Daiko and Taiko With Toni, organized a benefit concert to help with the relief efforts in Japan. Over 900 people attended the concert that included performances from three local taiko groups, Koto Colorado, and the Tri-State Denver Buddhist Temple Minyo Dancers. This collaborative event made over $20,000 of which 100% of the proceeds were donated to the Northern Japan Earthquake Relief Fund.

== Discography ==
- 1999: Ichi Go Ichi E
- 2011: Tabi: released to commemorate the group's 35th anniversary

Approximately two thirds of the songs that Denver Taiko performs on a regular basis are original compositions.

== Outreach ==
Denver Taiko sends representatives to the North American Taiko Conference every two years. The group also hopes to coordinate a workshop for taiko groups in Colorado.

Denver Taiko has also organized an apprenticeship program since 2008.

== Junior Taiko ==
Denver Taiko also runs a youth ensemble called Junior Taiko for young students to learn taiko. Two former Denver Taiko members Toni Yagami and Nancy Ozaki Tsuchimoto started the youth development group in 1985. Since 1985, the Junior Taiko has grown to over 30 members. The members of Junior Taiko range from third grade students to high school students. The group has weekly rehearsals in the Tri-State Denver Buddhist Temple on Sundays. Junior Taiko members do not perform as often as the adult Denver Taiko group, but they do perform on stage occasionally and in festivals such as Sakura Matsuri.

== See also ==
- Kodo - a professional taiko group based in Sado Island, Japan
- Taiko - A description of the taiko musical art form
- San Francisco Taiko Dojo - The first taiko group in North America
- Kinnara Taiko - The second taiko group in North America
- San Jose Taiko - The third taiko group in North America
