= Kinnara Taiko =

- Origin: Los Angeles, USA
- Genres: Japanese Taiko drums, percussion ensemble
- Years active: 1969–present

Kinnara Taiko is a Japanese American drumming ensemble (playing taiko) based out of Senshin Buddhist Temple in Los Angeles, US. They began playing taiko in 1969 when a few third-generation Japanese Americans gathered after an Obon festival and had an impromptu experimental session on an odaiko drum.

Naming themselves after the celestial musicians of Buddhist mythology, the Kinnara, Kinnara Taiko became the first Japanese American Buddhist taiko group. As a Buddhist group, Kinnara places more emphasis on participation, self-awareness and discovering the joy in “just playing” taiko rather than stressing perfection and professionalism as other performance-focused taiko groups do.

They contributed largely to the development of kumi-daiko in North America with their innovation of wine barrel drums and their extensive outreach to other Japanese American Buddhist communities in helping start other temple-based taiko groups.

== History ==
Kinnara Taiko officially began in 1969 at the Jodo Shinshu Senshin Buddhist Temple (a member of the Buddhist Churches of America) in Los Angeles. After playing on a drum for hours the night of an Obon festival when Rev. Masao “Mas” Kodani, who had been recently schooled in Japan, brought up the drum's use in Japan, he and six other temple members decided to start a formal group based loosely on the pictures and recordings they had seen and heard of Japanese taiko players.

Having only a single taiko drum and not enough money to purchase new authentic drums for the other players, the members of Kinnara began experimenting with inexpensive versions for their own drums. At first they used nail keg wooden barrels and tried to stretch leather over them for the drumheads, but soon upgraded to oak wine barrels and rawhide with much more success. They practiced in Senshin Temple and performed at both temple functions and public events, where they drew considerable crowds due to their uniqueness as one of the first taiko groups in the country.

Throughout the 1970s Kinnara performed at various Buddhist temples across the United States and helped start taiko groups at many of them to help attract younger generations to become involved in temple life. These included performances in Palo Alto, California, at the Ginza Festival in Chicago, and many other places.

The group has performed widely in the United States at schools and universities, multi-cultural folk festivals, Buddhist Temples and for Japanese American and Asian Pacific American organizations. Performances in the past have included The Olympic Arts Festival, Los Angeles; Memphis in May, Memphis, Tennessee; an Obon Festival in Charlotte, North Carolina; a Japanese Festival Celebration at the Morikami Museum in Delray Beach, Florida; and for Delta Air Lines in Atlanta, Georgia.

== Membership ==
Kinnara's membership consists mostly of Japanese Americans, although there is no exclusion in membership. All who are willing to play are welcomed, and most members are either affiliated with Senshin Temple or collegiate taiko players looking for a group to join.

The original members of Kinnara were: Rev. Masao Kodani, George Abe, Johnny Mori, Clark Nakashita, Wilbur Takashima, George Yamashita, and May Sugano.

Notable members who have played with Kinnara over the years and have since started other prominent taiko groups include:

-Kenny Endo – Taiko Center of the Pacific, Kenny Endo Taiko Ensemble

-Etsuo Hongo – Los Angeles Matsuri Taiko, Mugen Taiko, Koshin Taiko

-Rev. Tom Kurai – Taiko Center of Los Angeles, Satori Daiko, Shizen Daiko

-Bruce Arikawa – Togen Daiko

== Style ==
Kinnara's sound is based in the tradition of Japanese and Japanese American festival drumming, but they also blend these traditional Japanese rhythms with American musical influences from rock to jazz to R&B to reflect the experience and lifestyles of its members in Southern California. In the beginning their original compositions were vague copies of the Japanese recordings and pictures they were given, but other influences were drawn from African music as well. Two of their main original pieces include Samsara, written by Johnny Mori, and Ashura, written by Rev. Kodani.

Kinnara has a very informal style of practice and performance in comparison to most other kumidaiko groups. Kinnara seeks to include all those who wish to join their group regardless of age or ability. They encourage participation by anybody interested in both taiko or Buddhism, and keep their practices very informal with no organized routines or schedules. They do not have a teacher, and encourage collaboration on original compositions. Their pieces are taught by kuchi shoga.

== Connections and influences ==
Throughout its long history, Kinnara's influence has touched many groups stretching from California, Colorado, Utah, Hawaii as well as groups in Chicago, New York, Minneapolis and Seattle.

== See also ==
- San Francisco Taiko Dojo
- Stanford Taiko
- UCLA Kyodo Taiko
- UCI Jodaiko
- Denver Taiko
- Sawagi Taiko
- Midwest Buddhist Temple Taiko
- Portland Taiko
- Seattle Kokon Taiko.
