= Seattle Kokon Taiko =

- Origin: Seattle, Washington, USA
- Genres: Japanese Taiko drums North American Taiko percussion ensemble
- Years active: 1980–present
- Website: www.seattlekokontaiko.org

Seattle Kokon Taiko (SKT) is a North American taiko ensemble based in Seattle, Washington. It was founded from two separate taiko groups, Seattle Taiko Group and Kokon Taiko Ensemble in 1990 and continues to perform as an active member of the Seattle taiko and arts scene.

== Mission statement ==
"Through taiko, we hope to contribute to the development of a uniquely Japanese American art form — Japanese in origin, American in expression — that weaves threads of continuity between generations and builds bridges of understanding among people of all nationalities and walks of life. "

== History ==
In April 1980, Ondekoza, the famed Japanese taiko group, appeared at the Seattle Cherry Blossom Festival. Members of the local Japanese-American community were impressed and inspired to take up the art form themselves. Sue Taoka, a community activist and former member of Denver Taiko, who had received training from Sensei Seiichi Tanaka of the San Francisco Taiko Dojo, agreed to teach the new group which began gathering in Seattle's Chinatown/International District.

In the first eight months of their existence, over 50 different people took part in the several times a week group practices with many leaving after various periods of participation. The high turnover rate was due in part to the physical demands and time commitment required (Taoka was a strict teacher who emphasized fundamentals and encouraged at-home drilling). An even bigger impediment may have been the lack of actual drums. The group drilled in a rat-infested, empty storefront in Seattle's Chinatown on used car tires, and later, one broken Chinese Lion Dance drum salvaged from the trash. As the core group began to emerge, they solicited local merchants in the Japanese-American community to raise funds to purchase the materials needed to make the first set of taiko drums.

In July 1981, the Seattle Taiko Group made its official debut at the Seattle Chinatown/International District Summer Festival with a line-up that included Sue Taoka, William Satake Blauvelt, Jeff Hanada, Richard Higa, Ann Kawasaki, Kathy Kozu, Jan Kubota, Akemi Matsumoto and Masaye Okano (later Nakagawa). Although positively received, the group was dissatisfied with its performance and decided to postpone any further appearances for an extended period. During this time, Taoka left the group to attend law school full-time, and the group filled the gap by holding workshops with more established groups and teachers: including Kinnara Taiko of Los Angeles, Roy and P.J. Hirabayashi of the San Jose Taiko Group, and Sensei Seiichi Tanaka of the San Francisco Taiko Dojo.

Fellow travellers who also helped or encouraged the group at this time were sister group Katari Taiko of Vancouver B.C., Canada (who had formed the year before) and singer-songwriter Robert Kikuchi-Yngojo of San Francisco, CA.

Over the next several years, the group's line-up changed with only Blauvelt, Hanada and Okano (Nakagawa) remaining from the original group. Key new members included Stan Shikuma, Ken Mochizuki, Sheri Nakashima, Michelle Kumata, Tom Eng, Joanne Egashira, Harriet Kashiwada, Kaoru Nakamura, and Michio Teshima. The group performed at venues throughout the city and region and took part in workshops with Grand Master Daihachi Oguchi of Japan's Osuwa Daiko and the Okinawan all-women's group Miyarabi Taiko at the Japan/US Taiko Festival in San Francisco.

The group also participated in and performed at one of the first pilgrimages to Tule Lake, California – the site of one of 10 former concentration camps that held Japanese Americans during World War II. While there, the group met influential taiko artists Russel Baba and Jeanne Aiko Mercer from whom they would take workshops over the years.

In 1986, Stan Shikuma and Michio Teshima left the group to form a new group with William Satake Blauvelt (who had left in 1985 over artistic differences). Using the Japanese word "kokon", which refers to something that is both ancient and modern at the same time, and the desire to be a smaller, more adventurous musical group, they called themselves Kokon Taiko Ensemble. They spent a year building drums, gathering gear, and creating a repertoire that included traditionally-based pieces and jazz influenced work. After debuting as a trio at the Nippon Kan Theater, the group wanted to expand their sound by incorporating fue (Japanese flute) and more extensive use of percussion to augment the drums. They taught an extended series of taiko classes from which they recruited new members Joyce Nakamura and Martin Louie and became a quintet performing at area festivals and on local television.

In 1990, the two groups reconciled. Seattle Taiko Group had lost much of its membership in the previous years and Kokon Taiko Ensemble's Michio Teshima was stricken with stomach cancer. Teshima, a respected community activist, was a bridge in bringing the two groups together, as he had been a part of both. After performing together at Teshima's memorial service, the two groups began rehearsing and agreed on a joint performance season billing themselves as Seattle and Kokon Taiko. After the season, a professional mediator was brought in to formally work out the terms of the merger and the combined group officially became Seattle Kokon Taiko. The original line-up featured Harriet Kashiwada, Sheri Nakashima, Meiko Blosser, Aiko Suganuma, Joyce Nakamura, Martin Louie, William Satake Blauvelt and Stan Shikuma. In addition to performing, each member took up various responsibilities running the group with Kashiwada heading the steering committee and Blauvelt and Shikuma co-artistic directing. Shikuma described the two groups as a "diverging stream that reconnects."

The newly minted Seattle Kokon Taiko went on to perform at all the major festivals in the area, including a joint appearance with taiko master Kenny Endo at Bumbershoot: the Seattle Arts Festival. They also later appeared onstage at that festival's "Bumberdrum!" percussion summit with artists from around the world, including Brazilian master Airto and Micheal Shrieve of Santana. Seattle Kokon Taiko also produced "New Songs for Ancient Voices" the first evening length concert by a local taiko group presented as part of new music organization Marzena's spring festival in honor of Japanese composer Tōru Takemitsu. The group also began ongoing collaborations with choreographer A.C. Peterson ("Ozkei") and butoh dancer Joan Laage ("The Bride's Tales") appearing at On the Board's Northwest New Works Festival and the Seattle Fringe Festival respectively. The group also expanded its musical horizons by incorporating improvisational soloing with jazz saxophonist Steve Yamasaki and Native American and Japanese folk singing with vocalist Takuya Funaki.

== Present ==
Today, Seattle Kokon Taiko remains one group that practices regularly to perform for the Seattle community and beyond. Seattle Kokon Taiko has evolved into a massively important part of the Seattle community. Like San Jose Taiko, it is a community-based group without a sensei. They are directed by a five-member board of directors, with about nine more performing members. Previously, there were distinct roles filled by the members (artistic director, Performance Director, etc.), but now most of the roles are shared by group members, with the exception of Treasurer and Booking Coordinator.

== Performance style ==
Stan Shikuma describes the group's kata as a stylistic variation of the kata taught by Seiichi Tanaka at San Francisco Taiko Dojo. However, Seattle Kokon Taiko does have repertoire that are Oedo Sukeroku naname, or slant, style, upright beta style, and Yodan style.

== Influences ==
Seattle Kokon Taiko list many different taiko artists and groups as early and later influences. Their early influences include Seiichi Tanaka and San Francisco Taiko Dojo, San Jose Taiko, Kinnara Taiko, and Katari Taiko. Their later influences include Uzume Taiko, Kenny Endo, and Kodo.

Seattle Kokon Taiko has maintained relationships especially with Uzume Taiko because of their geographical proximity.

== Discography ==
- Quiet No More, 1997.
