= Midwest Buddhist Temple Taiko =

American taiko group

The Midwest Buddhist Temple Taiko group is a self-taught taiko group based in Chicago, Illinois, at the Midwest Buddhist Temple (Buddhist Churches of America). The group started in 1977 based upon Buddhistic principals after the model of Kinnara Taiko in Los Angeles. The Midwest Buddhist Temple Taiko group performs for the temple, the Buddhist community, the Japanese American community, other communities, commercial gigs, business conferences, and different ethnic fairs. They do not consider themselves to be primarily a performing group, and they do service projects with the temple such as performing at the Midwest Buddhist Temple Ginza Holiday Festival.

== History ==
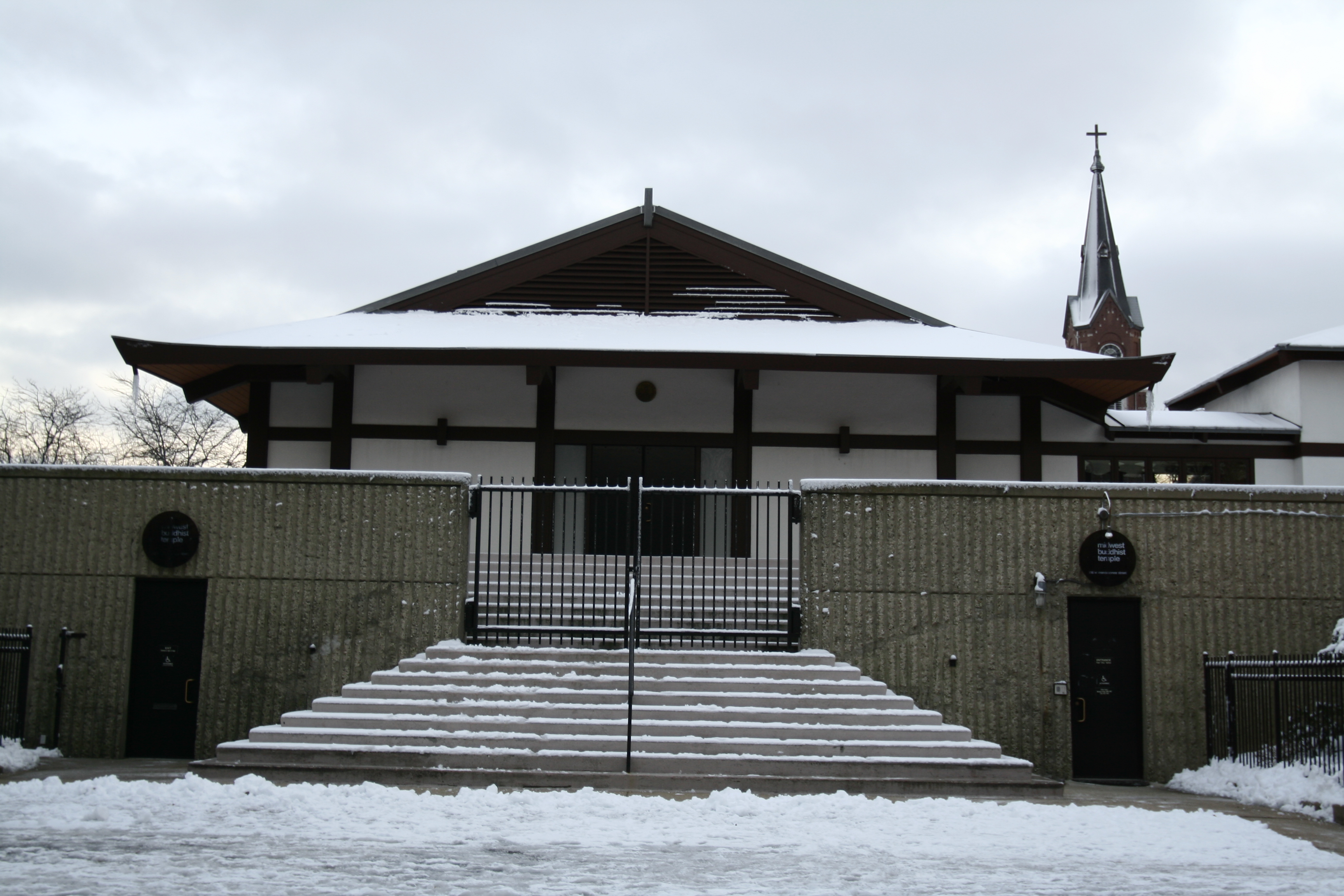
The Midwest Buddhist Temple

The Midwest Buddhist Temple Taiko group started in 1977 with the help of the Kinnara Taiko based out of the Senshin Buddhist Temple in Los Angeles, California. The Midwest Buddhist Temple Taiko group inherited the Kinnara Taiko Group philosophy for Japanese American Buddhist Taiko. In the 1970s, Reverend Masao Kodani of Kinnara Taiko helped groups such as San Jose Taiko, Ogden (Utah) Taiko, Denver Taiko, Midwest Buddhist Temple Taiko, Orange County Taiko, and several other groups throughout the United States in their early stages of development. Midwest Buddhist Temple Taiko was the first group east of Denver.

== Midwest Buddhist Temple ==
At the end of World War II, Chicago attracted Japanese American workers with job opportunities. In 1944, Reverend Gyodo Kono started the Midwest Buddhist Temple as Japanese Americans were released from the World War II relocation camps. The Midwest had much less discrimination than areas in the West Coast, and jobs were available. Of about 120,000 Japanese and Japanese-Americans that were interned, about 20,000 were present in Chicago at the end of the war. Japanese immigrants introduced Buddhism to the United States between the late 1890s and 1924. The Midwest Buddhist Temple was originally an ethnic temple, but in the 1970s, it started to expand beyond just the Japanese American community. The temple tried to go beyond being an ethnic temple and increased efforts to spread Buddhism to surrounding communities. Eventually, many immigrants began to move back to the West Coast and to the suburbs as seen in temple demographics, for there was no Japantown or Little Tokyo in Chicago.

== Music and rhythms ==
In the mid-1970s, Johnny Mori and George Abe of Kinnara Taiko taught members of Midwest Buddhist Temple how to make drums with barrels and car jacks. For performances today, they use any combination of four odaiko (thirty-gallon), six jozuke (fifteen-gallon), four shime-daiko (from Japan, tightened with bolts, not ropes), and a mixture of kane, chappa, binzasara and two conch shells (a Pacific Triton and an East Coast shell), as well as a mixture of old drums used for practice and workshops. Costumes include happi coats with black pants, black t-shirt, hachimaki and tabi.

The group’s form and musicality depend on the piece, but they typically use the Kinnara stance: a 45-degree body and legs equidistant outside of the shoulders with the left knee paramount to the stance and the back leg more straight. They also use the thrust stance that most taiko players use today.

There is no master teacher, and the group describes itself as self-governed. There is usually an elected practice leader, a business manager, a treasurer, and a historian. All members have the opportunity to teach a piece if they have expertise in it, and arrangements are considered a democratic group effort.

Practices include a little opening, exercises, stretching, drilling, and one or two pieces. The group usually practices for two hours each week and holds more practices closer to the Ginza Holiday Festival. Although the group once practiced all year-round, the group usually takes a break from Thanksgiving to early January to feel refreshed for the new year.

The Midwest Buddhist Temple taiko group performs at commercial events, business conferences, bars, nightclubs, and different ethnic fairs. The group has traveled as far as Philadelphia to the east and Minneapolis and St. Louis to the west. The Chicago-based taiko group has its own venue to use as practice space and equipment storage, and the temple has contributed greatly to the group’s longevity.

== Affiliations ==
In 1979, an event called Horaku invited all taiko players in the United States and brought together all of the Buddhist Taiko Groups during that time. This event was considered to be the first taiko conference, and both Bugaku and Gagaku performances were involved.

In the early 1980s, the Midwest Buddhist Temple Taiko group helped start the Ho Daiko Group group at the Seabrook Buddhist Temple, the Soh Daiko Group at the New York Buddhist Church, and the Twin-Cities Taiko Group which changed their name to the Kogen Taiko Group, a part of the Twin-Cities Buddhist Association in Minnesota.

== Ginza Holiday Festival ==
The Midwest Buddhist Temple Ginza Holiday Festival is a summertime festival that features classical dance, martial arts, folk dance, and taiko. Three taiko groups are the main attraction at the Ginza Festival, and the Festival is considered the primary cultural event for Midwest Buddhist Temple. The Midwest Buddhist Temple taiko group has been performing in the Ginza festival since the mid-1980s with one exception when Kinnara performed in place of Midwest. The Midwest Buddhist Temple taiko group is self-sustaining and uses admission revenue from the festival to support the organization

== Membership ==
The Midwest Buddhist Temple Taiko group do not consider themselves to be a professional or semi-professional group. The group currently consists of fourteen adults between the ages of twenty and sixty. For the most part, only temple members are members of the taiko group; however, non-temple members and non-Japanese people may also play in the group. There is no audition process, and current members usually refer potential new members to the organization. New members attend practices during a one-year probation period. The group has also taken in members as young as the ages of thirteen and fourteen if they were siblings of existing players.

== Musical works ==
The Midwest Buddhist Temple Taiko group composes their own original music as well as plays pieces from the taiko community. They have close relationships with other groups and willingly share pieces. No published compacts discs or digital video discs exist to date.
