= Demographics of Chicago =

- Population pyramid of Chicago in 2021
- Population: 2,665,039 (2022 est.)

The demographics of Chicago show that it is a very large ethnically and culturally diverse metropolis. It is the third largest city and metropolitan area in the United States by population. Chicago was home to over 2.7 million people in 2020, accounting for over 25% of the population in the Chicago metropolitan area, home to approximately 9.6 million.

The racial makeup of the city in 2020 was 35.9% White, 29.2% Black, 7.0% Asian, 0.1% Native American or Alaska Native, 10.8% from two or more races, and 15.8% from some other race. The ethnic makeup of the population is 29.8% Hispanic or Latino, with 70.2% belonging to a non-Hispanic or Latino background. English is the primary language of the city. Christianity is the predominant faith.

During its first century as a city, Chicago grew at a rate that ranked among the fastest growing in the world. Within the span of forty years, the city's population grew from slightly under 30,000 to over 1 million by 1890. By the close of the 19th century, Chicago was the fifth largest city in the world, eventually growing to become the third largest city in the world by 1933. Within fifty years of the Great Chicago Fire of 1871, the population had tripled to over 3 million. The city's population peaked in the 1950 Census, although the city saw moderate growth in the 2000 and 2020 Censuses.

== Population ==
Historical population
Census	Pop.	Note	%±
1840	4,470		—
1850	29,963		570.3%
1860	112,172		274.4%
1870	298,977		166.5%
1880	503,185		68.3%
1890	1,099,850		118.6%
1900	1,698,575		54.4%
1910	2,185,283		28.7%
1920	2,701,705		23.6%
1930	3,376,438		25.0%
1940	3,396,808		0.6%
1950	3,620,962		6.6%
1960	3,550,404		−1.9%
1970	3,366,957		−5.2%
1980	3,005,072		−10.7%
1990	2,783,726		−7.4%
2000	2,896,016		4.0%
2010	2,695,598		−6.9%
2020	2,746,388		1.9%

In the 2010 United States census, there were 2,695,598 people and 1,194,337 households residing within the city limits of Chicago. More than half the population of the state of Illinois lives in the Chicago metropolitan area. The 2000 United States census had shown the population density of the city itself was 12,750.3 people per square mile (4,923.0/km^{2}), making it one of the nation's most densely populated cities. There were 1,152,868 housing units at an average density of 5,075.8 per square mile (1,959.8/km^{2}).

Of the 1,061,928 households in the 2000 census, 28.9% had children under the age of 18 living with them, 35.1% were married couples living together, 18.9% had a female householder with no husband present, and 40.4% were non-families. The median income for a household in the city was $38,625 in 2000, and the median income for a family was $46,748. Males had a median income of $35,907 versus $30,536 for females. Below the poverty line were 19.6% of the population and 16.6% of the families.

== Racial and ethnic makeup ==
=== 2020 census ===
Chicago, Illinois – Racial and ethnic composition Note: the US Census treats Hispanic/Latino as an ethnic category. This table excludes Latinos from the racial categories and assigns them to a separate category. Hispanics/Latinos may be of any race.
Race / Ethnicity (NH = Non-Hispanic)	Pop 1970	Pop 1980	Pop 1990	Pop 2000	Pop 2010	Pop 2020	% 1970	% 1980	% 1990	% 2000	% 2010	% 2020
White alone (NH)	1,958,767	1,299,557	1,056,048	907,166	854,717	863,622	58.17%	43.25%	37.94%	31.32%	31.71%	31.45%
Black or African American alone (NH)	1,102,620	1,187,905	1,076,099	1,053,739	872,286	787,551	32.75%	39.53%	38.66%	36.39%	32.36%	28.68%
Native American or Alaska Native alone (NH)	x	6,072	5,370	4,253	4,097	3,332	x	0.20%	0.19%	0.15%	0.15%	0.12%
Asian alone (NH)	36,262	68,347	99,252	124,437	144,903	189,857	1.08%	2.27%	3.57%	4.30%	5.38%	6.91%
Native Hawaiian or Pacific Islander alone (NH)	x	844	1,046	972	557	529	x	0.03%	0.04%	0.03%	0.02%	0.02%
Other race alone (NH)	20,308	20,284	3,363	4,331	4,227	11,536	0.60%	0.67%	0.12%	0.15%	0.16%	0.42%
Mixed race or Multiracial (NH)	x	x	x	47,474	35,949	70,443	x	x	x	1.64%	1.33%	2.56%
Hispanic or Latino (any race)	249,116	422,063	535,315	753,644	778,862	819,518	7.4%	14.05%	19.23%	26.02%	28.89%	29.84%
Total	3,366,957	3,005,072	2,783,726	2,896,016	2,695,598	2,746,388	100.00%	100.00%	100.00%	100.00%	100.00%	100.00%

==== 2025 American Community Survey one-year estimates ====
Racial Makeup of Chicago (2025): 1. White alone (34.8%); 2. Black alone (26.6%); 3. Native American alone (1.21%); 4. Asian Alone (8.17%); 5. Pacific Islander Alone (0.01%); 6. Other race alone (16.6%); 7. Two or more races (12.7%)	Racial/Ethnic Makeup of Chicago excluding Hispanics from racial categories (2025); NH=Non-Hispanic: 1. White NH (31.1%); 2. Black NH (26.2%); 3. Native American NH (0.07%); 4. Asian NH (8.07%); 5. Pacific Islander NH (0.01%); 6. Other race NH (0.48%); 7. Two or more races NH (3.81%); 8. Hispanic Any Race (30.3%)	Racial Makeup of Hispanics in Chicago (2025): 1. White alone (12.2%); 2. Black alone (1.46%); 3. Native American alone (3.73%); 4. Asian Alone (0.34%); 5. Pacific Islander Alone (0.01%); 6. Other race alone (53.0%); 7. Two or more races (29.3%)

According to 2021 US Census Bureau American Community Survey one-year estimates, which is conducted annually for cities over 65,000 via sampling, the population of Chicago, Illinois was 36.1% White (32.9% Non-Hispanic White and 3.2% Hispanic White), 28.5% Black or African American, 6.9% Asian, 1.1% Native American and Alaskan Native, 0.1% Pacific Islander, 13.1% Some Other Race, and 14.2% from two or more races.

The White population is the largest racial category and includes the 10.9% of Hispanics who identify as White, with the remaining Hispanics identifying as Other Race (43.5%), Multiracial (40.1%), Black (1.5%), American Indian and Alaskan Native (3.7%), Asian (0.3%), and Hawaiian and Pacific Islander (0.1%). By ethnicity, 28.8% of the total population is Hispanic-Latino (of any race) and 71.2% is Non-Hispanic (of any race). If treated as a separate category, Hispanics are the largest minority group in Chicago.

In 2021, 20.4% of the population was foreign born. Of this, 51.8% came from Latin America, 16.8% from Europe, 24.8% from Asia and 6.6% from other parts of the world. As of 2018 - 2022, the Chicago metropolitan area had the fourth highest foreign-born population in the United States, surpassed only by New York, Los Angeles, and Miami. According to the Brookings Institution, Chicago is one of only four US metropolitan areas to be considered "major-continuous gateways" for immigration from the early 20th century until present-day. Along with New York, Boston, and San Francisco, the Chicago area's foreign-born proportion has exceeded the national average for every decade of the past century, suggesting its historic and continued desirability as a destination for new arrivals to the US. Indeed, from 1980 - 2000, the immigrant population of the Chicago PMSA nearly doubled (+91%) - primarily driven by immigration from Mexico. As early as the 1990s, however, observers noted that the suburbs began absorbing a larger amount of immigrants than the central city, which traditionally served as the funnel through which new arrivals entered. In that decade, the suburbs came to house a majority of the Chicago area's immigrants, moving from 47% to 56% of the total.

In 2016, the population of Hispanics exceeded that of Blacks to become Chicago's largest minority group with non-Hispanic Whites representing 32.6% of the population, Hispanics at 29.7% of the population, and Blacks at 29.3% of the population. The large Hispanic population is rather recent, with the segregation between Hispanics and non-Hispanic Whites being low when compared to Blacks and non-Hispanic Whites. Over the years neighborhoods have seen gradual ethnic change with White ethnic neighborhoods like Brighton Park transitioning to Hispanic, while former Latino neighborhoods like West Town transition to majority non-Hispanic White.

The vast majority of Chicago Hispanics are of Mexican descent. As of the 2010 Census, 578,100 residents of the City of Chicago, had full or partial Mexican origins.

The Chicago metropolitan area has the third largest African American population, behind only New York City and Atlanta.

A thematic map of African American population centers.

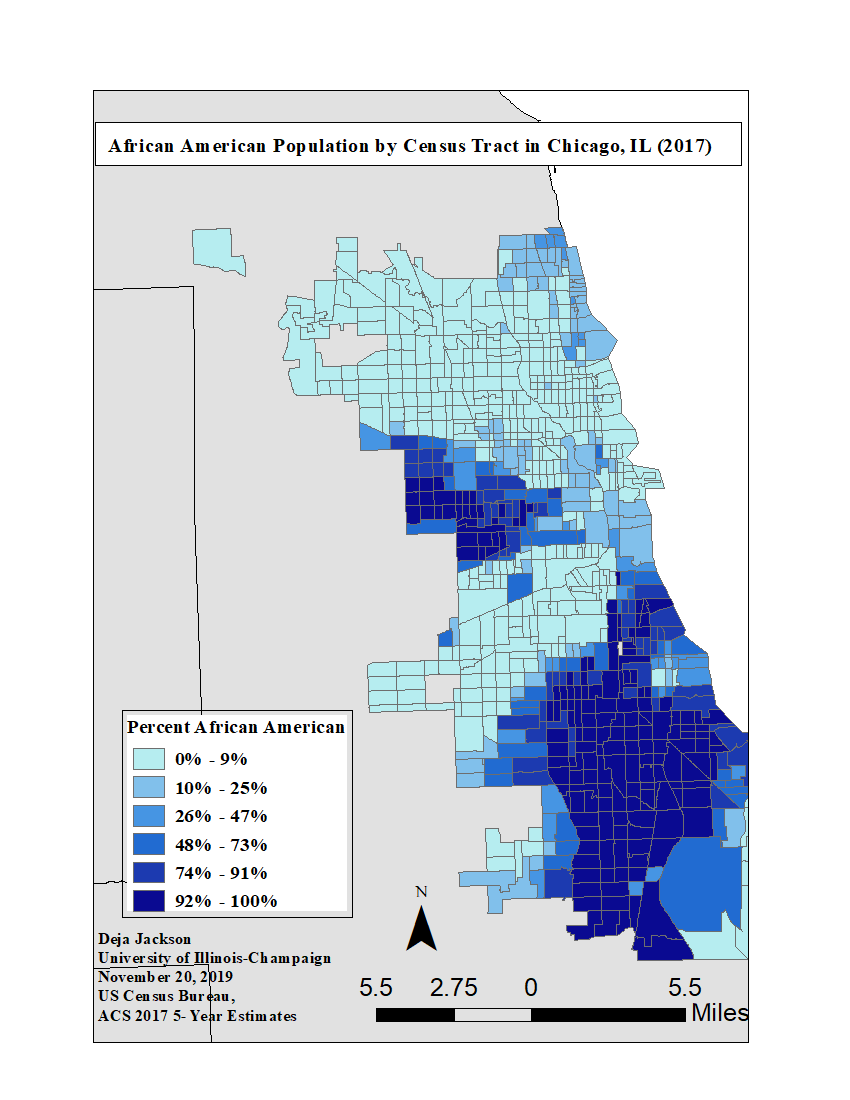
The African American population by census tract

The main ethnic groups in Chicago include Irish, German, Italian, Mexican, Assyrian, Arab, Armenian, Azerbaijani, Bangladeshi, Jews, English, Bosnian, Croatian, Bulgarian, Czech, Greek, Black, Korean, Chinese, Indian, Filipino, Lithuanian, Macedonian, Montenegrin, Albanian, Pakistani, Polish, Hungarian, Romanian, Russian, Serbian, Slovak, Swedish, Ukrainian, Dutch, Belgian, Cuban, Vietnamese, and Puerto Rican.

Chicago has a large Irish American population, with many still residing on the South Side. The early years of Chicago coincided with the significant rise in Irish immigration in the 1830s and 1840s. Some Irish already lived in Chicago when it was incorporated as a city in 1837. In the next few years Irish numbers grew rapidly, particularly after the arrival of refugees from the Great Famine. By 1850 Irish immigrants accounted for about one-fifth of the city's population. Many of the city's politicians are descendants of this group, including previous mayor Richard M. Daley. The Irish were able to assert themselves in politics due to their large population but also the fact that they knew English and that – thanks to the geographic position of Ireland on the periphery of Europe – they did not have ancestral ethnic rivalries. As the old saying went, "A Lithuanian won't vote for a Pole, and a Pole won't vote for a Lithuanian. A German won't vote for either of them. But all three will vote for a turkey. – an Irishman." Only the WASPs hated the Irish, and the WASPs all lived on the North Shore." The Irish gained entry to Chicago's Fire and Police Departments and have kept family traditions of participation in these units. The Irish laid the foundations for many of the city's Roman Catholic churches, schools and hospitals. The Irish are still very active in the city's politics.

Germans have constituted a major portion of ethnic whites in Chicago since the beginning of the city's history. When the Great Plains opened up for settlement in the 1830s and 1840s, many German immigrants stopped in Chicago to earn additional money before moving West to claim a homestead. Those with skills in demand could—and often did—stay. From 1850, when Germans constituted one-sixth of Chicago's population, until the turn of the 20th century, people of German descent constituted the largest ethnic group in the city, followed by Irish, Poles, and Swedes. In 1900, 470,000 Chicagoans—one out of every four residents—had either been born in Germany or had a parent born there. Although their numbers dropped because of reduced emigration from Germany and because World War I had made it unpopular to acknowledge one's German heritage, 22 percent of Chicago's population still did so in 1920. One of the most distinct of these German groups were the Volga Germans, or ethnic Germans having lived along the Volga River in Russia. They largely clustered in Jefferson Park on the city's Northwest Side, coming to the area mostly between the years 1907–1920. By 1930 450 families of Volga German heritage were living in the Jefferson Park area, most of whom originated from Wiesenseite. Chicago also hosts the headquarters of the largest Lutheran body in the United States, the Evangelical Lutheran Church in America.

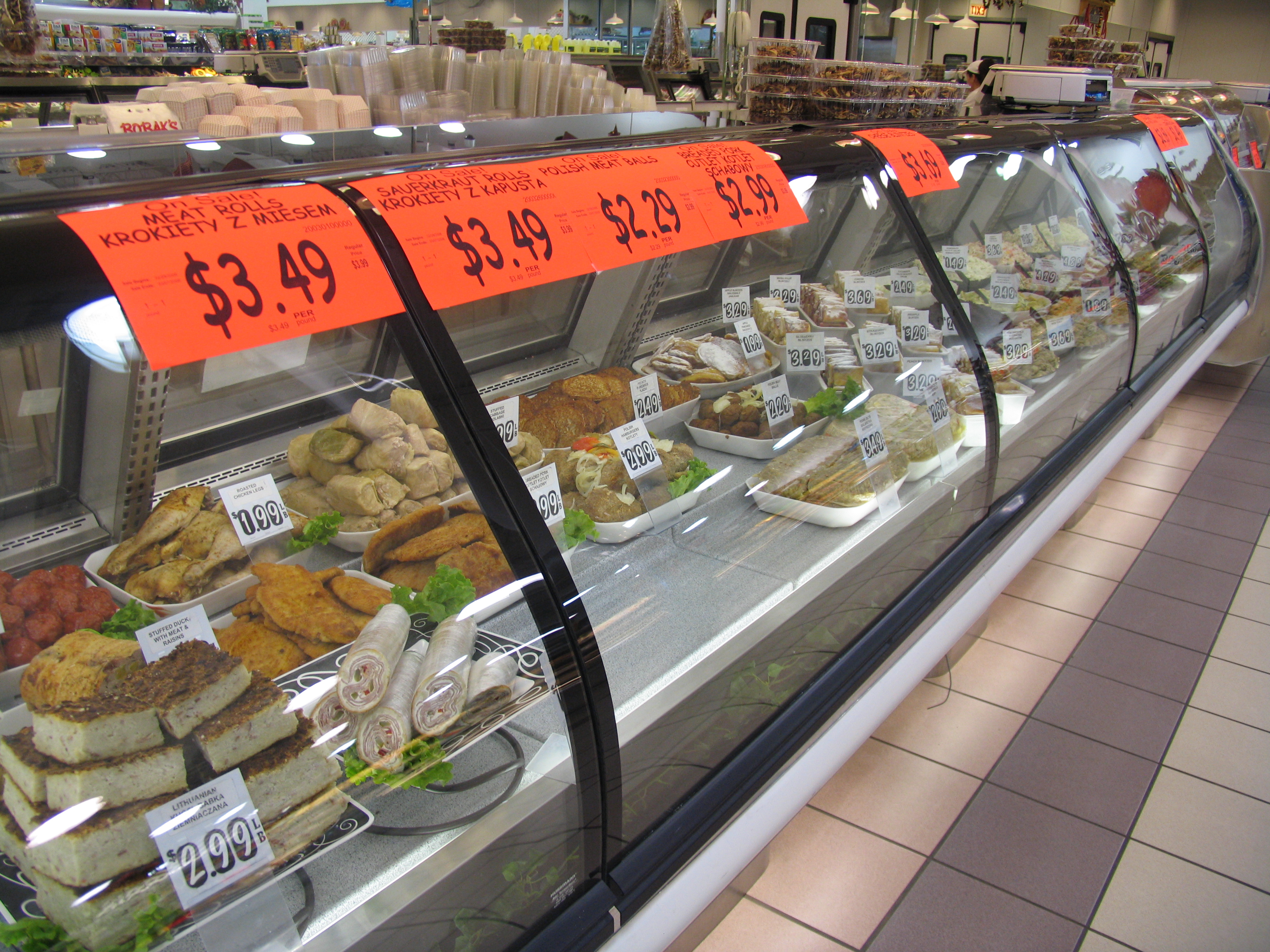
Bobak's Sausage Company's former Polish supermarket on the Southwest Side of Chicago

The city has one of the largest Assyrian diaspora populations, with the Assyrian community of Metropolitan Chicago numbering as many as 80,000. The Patriarchal see of the Assyrian Church of the East was based in Chicago for several decades up until 2015 when it was moved to Erbil. There is also a smaller Armenian diaspora in the Greater Chicago area, numbering around 10,000. There are seven Armenian Apostolic Churches in Chicagoland.

The city is the home to a large Romanian American community with more than 100,000.

Polish people have been prevalent from the city's early history, but the largest waves of immigration were in the late 19th and early 20th centuries; they have been influential in the economic and social development of Chicago. This is one of the most important centers of Polonia. The Taste of Polonia Festival in Jefferson Park celebrates Polish culture annually on Labor Day weekend. The Southwest Side is home to the largest concentration of Gorals (Carpathian highlanders) outside Europe. The southwest side is also the location of the Polish Highlanders Alliance of North America. Many Polish churches are found in Chicago, built in the Polish Cathedral style of architecture. Some can be seen from the Kennedy Expressway, other roadways, and public transportation routes, as well as from the neighborhood streets.

Chicago has one of the largest concentrations of Italian Americans in the US, with more than 500,000 living in the metropolitan area. Chicago has the third largest Italian American population in the United States, behind only New York City and Philadelphia. Chicago's Italian community has historically been based along the Taylor Street and Grand Avenue corridors on the West Side of the city. There are also significant Italian populations scattered throughout the city and surrounding suburbs.

Other prevalent European ethnic groups include the Czechs, and Ukrainians. At the turn of the 20th century, Chicago was the third-largest Czech city in the world, after Prague and Vienna. There are approximately 14,000 Ukrainians living within the Chicago city limits. Chicago has a small community of Swedish Americans, who make up 0.9% of Chicago's population and number at 23,990. After the Great Chicago Fire, many Swedish carpenters helped to rebuild the city, which led to the saying "the Swedes built Chicago." Swedish influence is evident in Andersonville on the far north side.

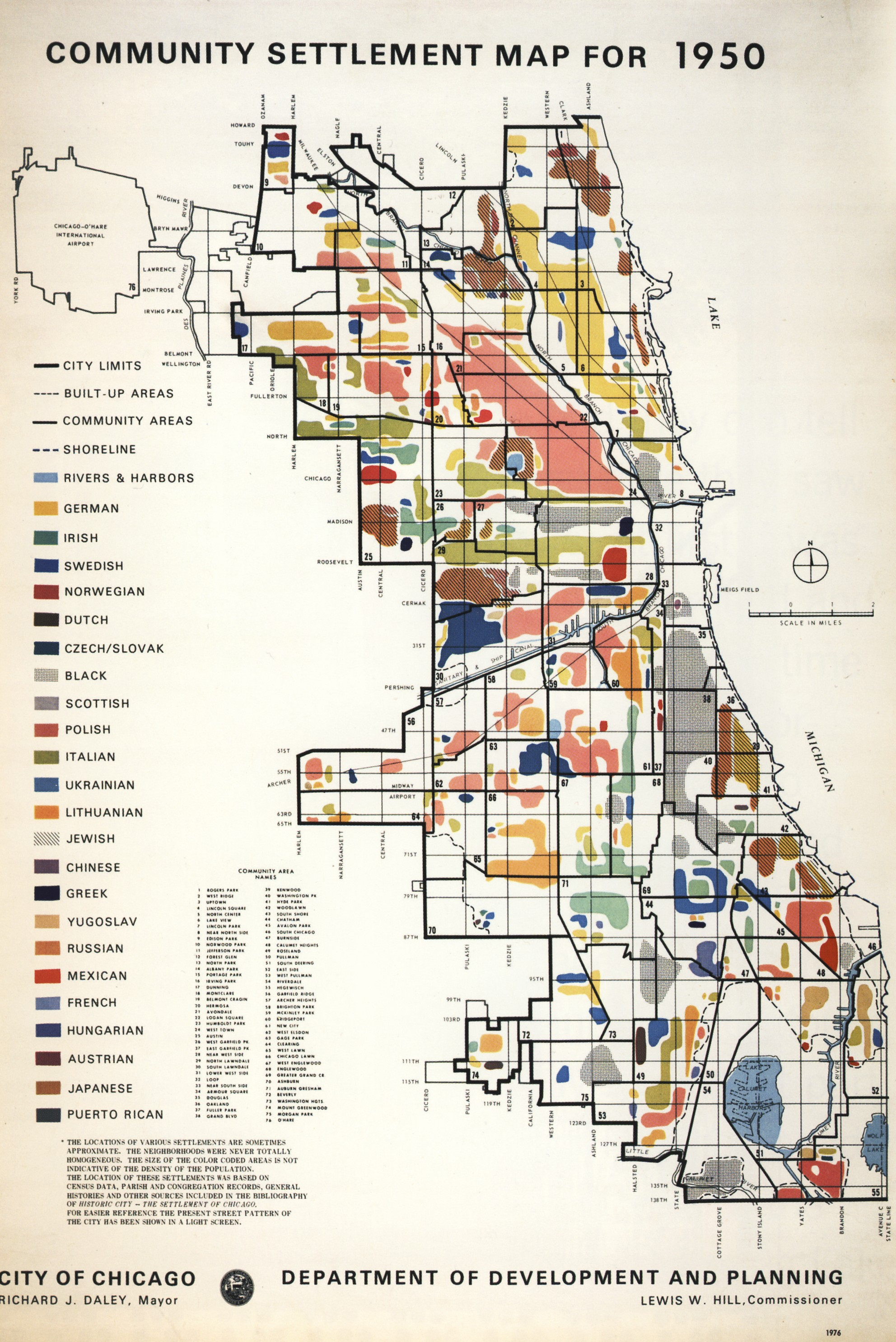
A demographic map of Chicago, 1950.

The city has a large population of Bulgarians, Lithuanians, Croats, Jewish, Greeks and Serbs. Chicago has a sizeable Romanian American community, As of 2018, the Lithuanian population is over 100,000 and was formerly over 300,000; the world's oldest continuously published Lithuanian-language newspaper Draugus is based in Chicago. The city is the seat of the Evangelical Covenant Church and the Evangelical Lutheran Church in America.

Chicago has the third-largest South Asian population in the United States, especially many Indians, Bangladeshi and Pakistanis. The Devon Avenue corridor on the far north side is one of the largest South Asian neighborhoods/markets in North America. As of the 2010 Census, Chicago has the third-largest Puerto Rican population in the continental United States, after New York City and Philadelphia, and the fourth largest Mexican population in the United States after Los Angeles, San Antonio, and Houston. There are about 185,000 Arabs in Cook County with another 75,000 in the five surrounding counties. Chicago is the center of the Palestinian and Jordanian immigrant communities in the United States, and additionally has a large Assyrian population.

There is a substantial Romani community in Chicago. The Roma first came to Chicago during the large waves of Southern and Eastern European immigration to the United States in the 1880s until World War I. They were following Serbian and Hungarian immigrants who found work in the steel mills and factories of the city.

Additionally, many Bosnians call Chicago home, first arriving in Chicago in the late 19th and early 20th centuries. As the former Yugoslavia continued to find its identity as a nation over the last century, the people of Bosnia and Herzegovina sought stability and new beginnings in the city of Chicago. Many intending to eventually return to their homeland, 40,000 came as refugees during the 1990s and early 2000s. Bosnian Muslims were early leaders in the establishment of Chicago's Muslim community. In 1906, they established Dzemijetul Hajrije (The Benevolent Society) of Illinois to preserve the community's religious and national traditions as well as to provide mutual assistance for funerals and illness. The organization established chapters in Gary, Indiana, in 1913, and Butte, Montana, in 1916, and is the oldest existing Muslim organization in the United States. The Bosnians were the first Muslims in the United States to incorporate an Islamic Association in 1906 in Chicago, Illinois. Today, Chicago and St. Louis are tied for the largest Bosnian population in the United States and the largest Bosnian population outside of Europe, with 70,000 in each city.

=== American Community Survey ===
The city saw an increase of 20,606 people from July 1, 2007 to July 1, 2008, according to census data. This marked the second consecutive year of population increase, while still not yet returning to the official Census 2000 population level. As of the 2007 US Census American Community Survey the largest European ancestries were:

- Irish: (201,836)
- German: (200,392)
- Polish: (179,868)
- Italian: (96,599)
- English: (60,307)

== Households ==
Chicago demographics
2000 Census Data	Chicago	Illinois	US
Total population	2,853,114	12,421,906
Population, percent change, 1990 to 2000	+4.0%	+8.6%	+13.1%
Population density	12,750.3/mi^{2}	223.4/mi^{2}	79.6/mi^{2}
Median household income (1999)	$38,625	$46,590	$41,994
Per capita income (1999)	$20,175	$23,104	$21,587
Bachelor's degree or higher	25.5%	26.1%	24.4%
Foreign born	21.7%	12.3%	11.1%
White	31.7%	73.5%	75.1%
Black	32.4%	15.1%	12.3%
Hispanic/Latino origin (of any race)	28.9%	12.3%	12.5%
Asian	5.4%	3.4%	3.6%

There were more than 1,061,928 households, of which 28.9% had children under the age of 18 living with them, 35.1% were married couples living together, 18.9% had a female householder with no husband present, and 40.4% were non-families. Of all households, 32.6% were made up of individuals, and 8.7% had someone living alone who was 65 years of age or older. The average household size was 2.67 and the average family size was 3.50.

Of the city population, 26.2% were under the age of 18, 11.2% were from 18 to 24, 33.4% were from 25 to 44, 18.9% from 45 to 64, and 10.3% 65 years of age or older. The median age was 32 years. For every 100 females there were 94.2 males. For every 100 females age 18 and over, there were 91.1 males.

The median income for a household in the city was $38,625, and the median income for a family was $42,724. Males had a median income of $35,907 versus $30,536 for females. The per capita income for the city was $20,175. Below the poverty line were 19.6% of the population and 16.6% of the families. Of the total population, 28.1% of those under the age of 18 and 15.5% of those 75 and older were living below the poverty line.

Population estimates in 2008 put the number of people in the city proper at 2,853,114, while suburban populations continue to grow, with estimates at 9,785,747 for the combined city and suburbs.

== Languages ==
According to the 2022 American Community Survey, the most commonly spoken languages in Chicago by people aged 5 years and over (2,519,527 people):

- Speak only English: 64.1%
- Language other than English: 35.9%
- Spanish: 24.3%
- Other Indo-European languages: 6.1%
- Asian languages and Pacific Island languages: 4.1%
- Other languages: 1.3%

== LGBT population ==
Chicago has one of the largest LGBTQ+ populations in the United States. In 2015, roughly 4% of the population identified as LGBTQ+. As of 2020, over 15,000 same-sex couples have wed in Cook County alone since the legalization of same-sex marriage in the State of Illinois in 2013.

== Religion ==
Christianity is predominant among the city's population who worship (71%). The Chicago metropolitan area also includes adherents of Judaism, Islam, Buddhism, and Hinduism, among others.

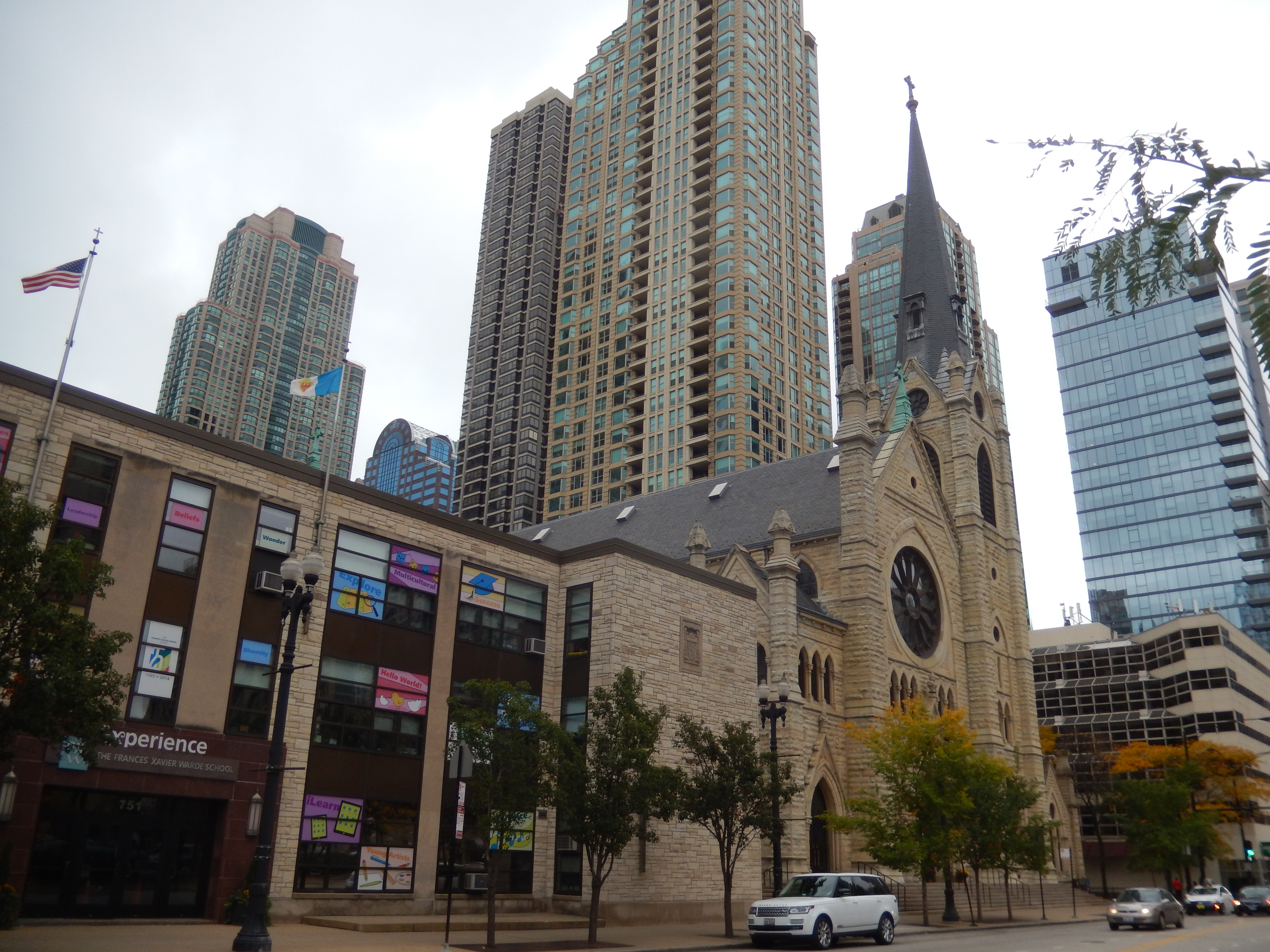
The only Catholic cathedral in Chicago and seat of the Archdiocese of Chicago

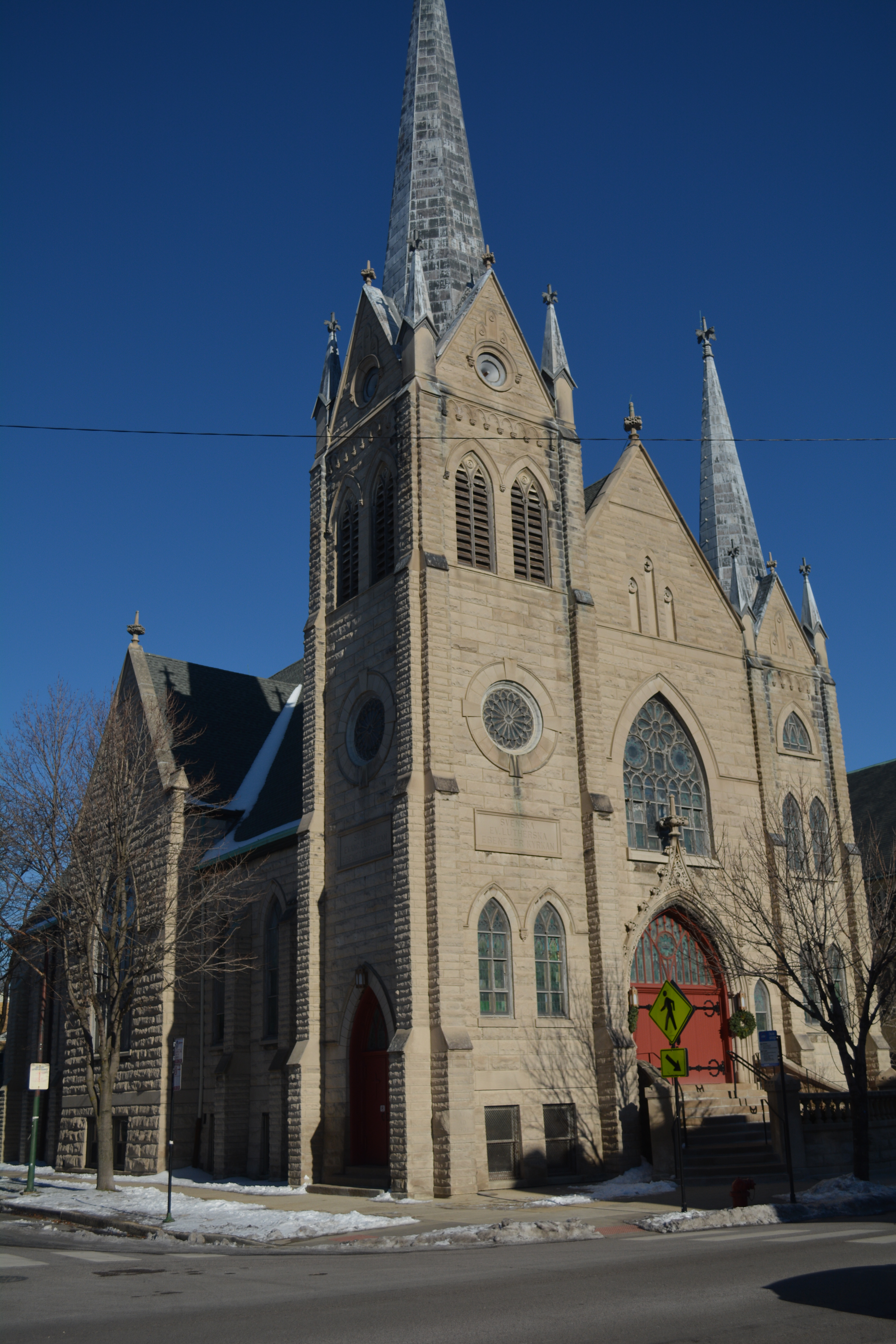
Ebenezer Lutheran Church, Chicago

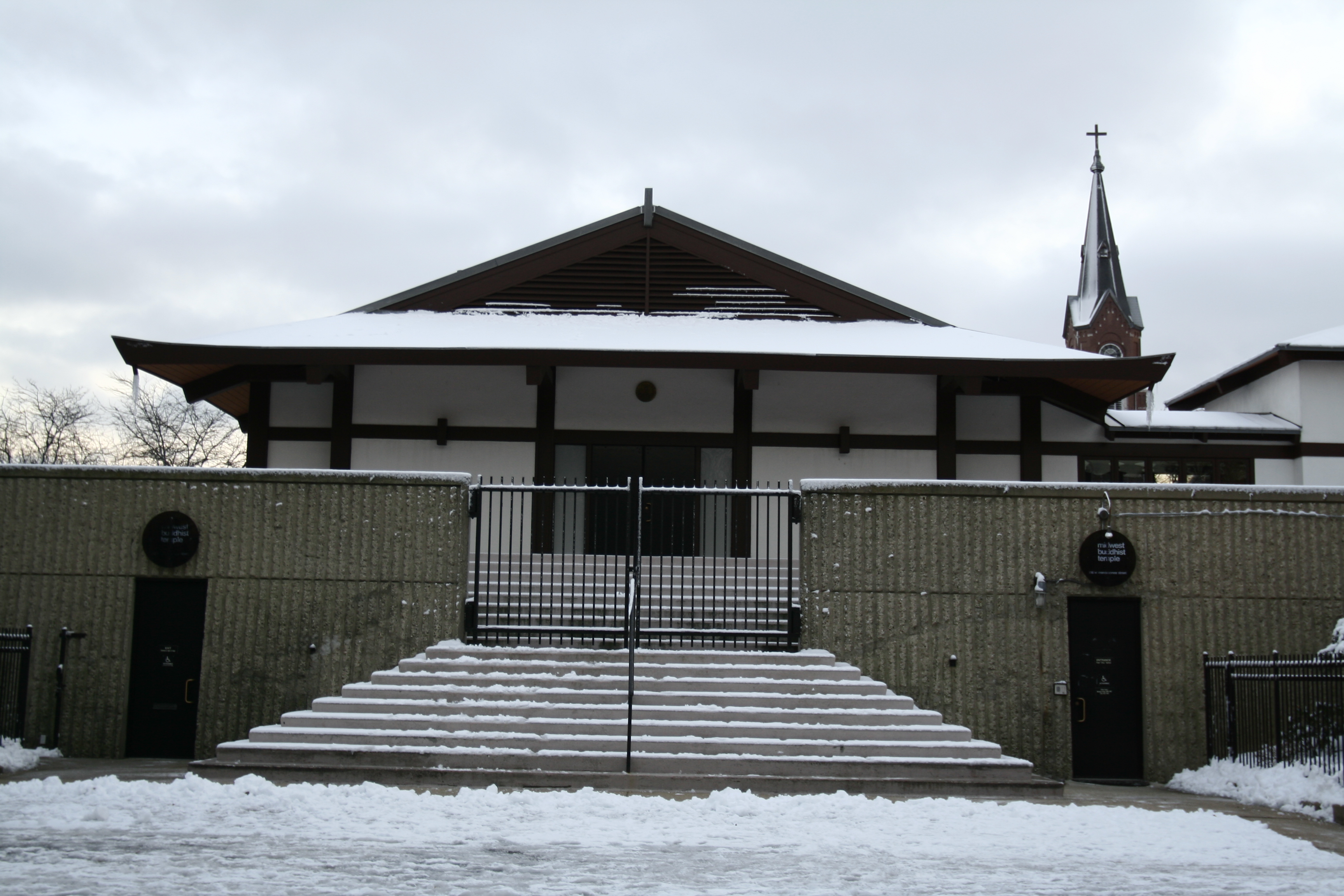
Midwest Buddhist Temple
