= Portland Taiko =

Background information
- Genres: Japanese Taiko drums, percussion ensemble
- Years active: 1994–present
- Website: www.portlandtaiko.org

Portland Taiko is a kumidaiko performance group based in Portland, Oregon, United States. Kumidaiko is the Japanese art form of ensemble drumming, also well known as "taiko", the Japanese word for drum. Portland Taiko was created in early 1994 by Ann Ishimaru and Zack Semke, both charter members of Stanford Taiko, Kyle Kajihiro, Valerie Otani, Kenji Spielman, and June Arima Schumann. Portland Taiko is an active organization to the present day and maintains professionalism in national performance tours, workshops, educational and community outreach and innovation in taiko playing. Portland Taiko is one of the only large taiko groups in the Pacific Northwest, with their closest counterpart being Seattle Kokon Taiko in Seattle, Washington.

== Group construction and work ==
Portland Taiko is a dual-composed company of a community group made of Portland Taiko members who play taiko as their avocation. Portland Taiko has a unique structure in that it is a community group, which is composed of everyone, and a smaller professional group which tours and is made up of the professional, full-time staff. The community group involved in about 20% of Portland Taiko's artistic activities, and members of the professional ensemble also are actively involved in the community group. The community group is an umbrella for everyone: volunteer performers as well as professional staff. The community group, however, is only involved in local performances, while the professional group is involved in all of Portland Taiko's home and local shows, assembly school programs, touring, daytime performances, and the logistic arrangements for the events and performances- the community members are not involved in PT's educational outreach shows.

The entire company is led by the artistic director, who leads all of the rehearsals for the performing company. The current artistic director of Portland Taiko is Michelle Fujii, a former member of UCLA Kyodo Taiko. Fujii took on the role of artistic director in 2005. Fujii has adapted and evolved many aspects of Portland Taiko, and has furthered the Community Performance Outreach Project, started originally by Ann Ishimaru and Zack Semke. This project emphasizes Portland Taiko's focus on community involvement and using the voices of the community to create new performance pieces. Some of the outcomes of this and other projects have included talking with community members who had lived in the Tule Lake War Relocation Center during World War II, exploring Japanese American history.

Portland Taiko is also very involved with educational outreach, performing at hundreds of schools in the Portland area and beyond. In the early years of the group, Portland Taiko reached over 20,000 students with their assembly performances and school workshops.

== Classes ==
Portland Taiko offers classes for community members of all ages. Classes are geared toward entering the community group or for fun for any community member. Adults can take classes which lead to the possible invitation by the artistic director to join the performance training class, offered four times a year. From the performance training class, students can then become trainees and finally become members of the community group.

Portland Taiko also offers youth classes which culminate in the youth performance group, Tanuki Taiko. Tanuki Taiko performance pieces are written by students and the ji is handed off to students in the class.

== Performances ==
Portland Taiko's first performance was for an event for John Kitzhaber, Oregon's governor. The group continued to perform for activism events and at local schools for assemblies and educational outreach. Portland Taiko has annual concerts, in which they perform their core repertory of songs and any pieces the group has created through their community outreach or collaborations with other taiko groups and solo performers such as solo taiko artist Tiffany Tamaribuchi, solo taiko artist Kenny Endo and PJ and Roy Hirabayashi of San Jose Taiko.

Portland Taiko performance ensemble tours across the United States and British Columbia, performing for organizations or with other taiko groups. Notable performances include performing at the Kennedy Center for Performing Arts in 2007. Portland Taiko also teaches workshops at colleges across the United States and in cities across the country.

== History ==
Ann Ishimaru and Zack Semke were the initial Artistic Directors of Portland Taiko. Ann Ishimaru and Zack Semke were both charter members of Stanford Taiko, the third collegiate taiko group in North America. Portland Taiko was started as an Asian American arts group. The group began teaching classes for youth and adults and created a youth taiko performance ensemble, Tanuki Taiko in 1998.

Membership of both the community group and performance ensemble has diversity of ethnicity and nationality. Portland Taiko allows members of all nationalities and ethnicity, though they are a Japanese drum (taiko) ensemble and stress the importance of Asian American pride and sharing Asian American culture and heritage.

== Publications ==
- Taikokinesis
- Rhythms of Change
- Big Bang
- Making Waves

== See also ==
- Culture of Portland, Oregon
