= SKT (disambiguation) =

SKT is a South Korean telecommunications provider.

SKT or Skt may also refer to:

== Music ==
- DJ S.K.T, a British dance musician
- Seattle Kokon Taiko, an American band

== Other uses ==
- Sialkot International Airport, Pakistan (IATA:SKT)
- Sanskrit (Skt.), an ancient language of South Asia
- Specialty Knowledge Test, of the US Air Force Weighted Airman Promotion System
- Finnish National Socialist Labor Organisation, a Nazi party in Finland from 1940 to 1944
