= San Jose Taiko =

Asian-American musical ensemble

- Origin: San Jose, California
- Years active: 1973–present
- Website: taiko.org

San Jose Taiko', founded in 1973, joined San Francisco Taiko Dojo (est, 1968) and Kinnara Taiko (est. 1969) as only the third Kumi-daiko, or ensemble taiko group, in North America. Initially a youth program at the San Jose Betsuin, a member of the Buddhist Churches of America, the group has evolved into a leading arts group not only in the Japanese American community but also in Asian American arts while maintaining unwavering allegiance to Japantown, San Jose.

== History ==
San Jose Taiko was founded by Roy Hirabayashi, Dean Miyakusu and Rev. Hiroshi Abiko. After the three attended a Kinnara retreat in Santa Barbara, they returned to San Jose where Hirabayashi and Miyakusu raised funds by tapping into the Japanese American band scene in the San Francisco Bay Area and holding dances for San Jose Sansei. Hugely popular events, the dances soon provided them with funds to travel to Los Angeles and tap Rev. Kodani and Kinnara Taiko for drumbuilding expertise and materials.

The group gave their first performance in October 1973. The next summer they played their first Obon at San Jose Betsuin and have been a mainstay of the annual festival since then.

In 1985, Roy Hirabayashi and Irene Matsumoto launched San Jose Taiko Junior Taiko, the first program to teach taiko to young people. Mark Honda, a student from that program helped establish UCLA Kyodo Taiko, the first collegiate taiko group, in 1990. UCI Jodaiko and Stanford Taiko were formed shortly after that in 1992. The formation of Stanford Taiko is notable because it was inspired by a class taught at Stanford by Susan Hayase, a San Jose Taiko alumna.

== Community ==
Many of the original members of the group were involved with San Jose State University's nascent Asian American Studies program. Since their founding, San Jose Taiko has nurtured their ties to San Jose Japantown. During the 1970s and 1980s many members supported community action in San Jose Japantown that led to the establishment of San Jose Taiko as a 501(c)3 non-profit arts organization but also to the senior center, Yu Ai Kai, and legal support for the community through the Asian Law Alliance. As a national and international touring company, San Jose Taiko continues to serve as an ambassador far beyond the borders of their hometown. In San Jose Japantown, Roy Hirabayashi and San Jose Taiko continue to work towards an arts center for Japantown that is slated to be built in Heinlenville Park.

San Jose Taiko's influence in establishing and expanding the global taiko community is particularly notable. Not only were alumni of San Jose Taiko programs instrumental in inspiring the development of collegiate taiko in North America, Roy and PJ Hirabayashi and members of San Jose Taiko encouraged and empowered collegiate players.

== Repertoire ==
San Jose Taiko has always developed its own repertoire, drawing inspiration from the music that surrounds them such as Latin, R&B, jazz, soul, pop, rock, and hip hop. The group incorporates instruments from around the world—shekere, kulintang, cowbell—that reflect a commitment to diversity and experimentation. Founder Roy Hirabayashi explains, "Soul and jazz were derived from the Black experience, but nothing on the popular market (was derived from) the Asian American experience... We were Japanese Americans who found taiko as a connection to our ethnic identity".

== Leadership ==
Roy Hirabayashi served as the group's first managing director and PJ Hirabayashi was its inaugural artistic director. The pair were recognized by the National Endowment for the Arts with a National Heritage Fellowship in 2011 for their role in developing and nurturing taiko, a significant newcomer to the American music scene. The two served in San Jose Taiko leadership until 2011 when Wisa Uemura stepped in as executive director and Franco Imperial became artistic director.

== Membership ==
Membership in the group is through a rigorous audition process. Before the advent of collegiate taiko groups, San Jose Taiko performers were often community members whose only experience with taiko was through San Jose Taiko's audition process. Recently, almost three-fourths of the performing members join San Jose Taiko with collegiate taiko experience.

Members and former members of San Jose Taiko play significant roles in the expansion of the North American taiko and arts communities. Some examples: Gary Tsujimoto and Nancy Ozaki, founders of One World Taiko; Janet Koike, founder of Rhythmix Cultural Works; Toni Yagami, founder, Taiko with Toni; Wisa Uemura, treasurer, Taiko. Community Alliance.
