= Visalia Buddhist Church =

Buddhist temple in Visalia, California

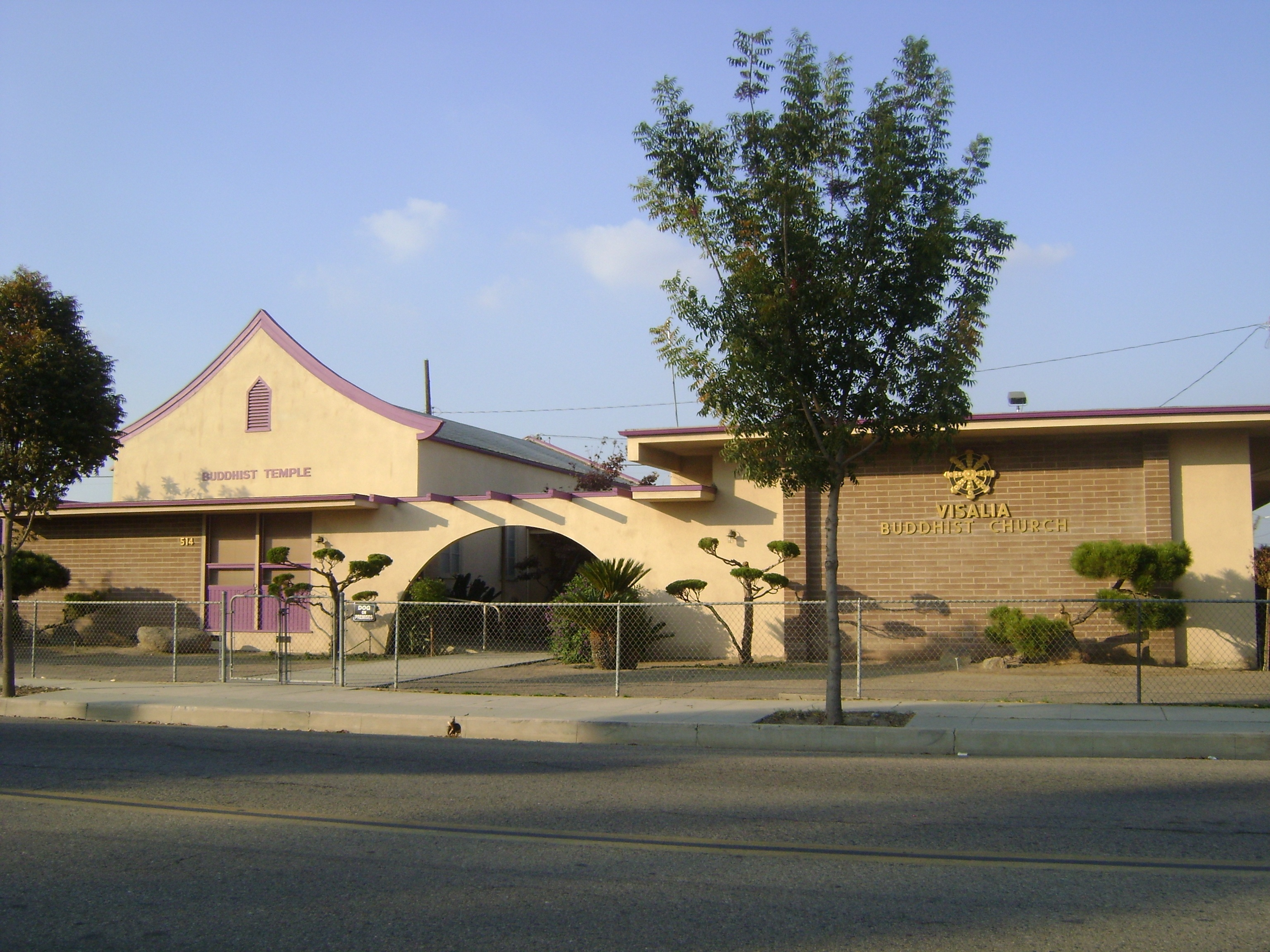

Religion
- Affiliation: Buddhism
- Leadership: Rinban Kakei Nakagawa; Rev. Alan Sakamoto

Location
- Location: 514 E Center Ave; Visalia, California
- Geographic coordinates: 36°19′52.9″N 119°17′13.4″W

Architecture
- Date established: 1907

Website
- https://visaliabuddhistchurch.org/

Visalia Buddhist Church (or Visalia Buddhist Temple) is a Buddhist temple in Visalia, California. It is an affiliate of the Buddhist Churches of America.

== History ==
After World War II, the Buddhist community in California struggled to recover due to the displacement of Japanese American citizens. Ministers from the Visalia Buddhist Church would travel to Bakersfield, California on a monthly basis to provide the community at the Buddhist Church of Bakersfield with religious services.

Over the course of its development, the Visalia Buddhist Church has sponsored affiliated organizations including the Visalia Buddhist Church Club and the Samurais basketball team.

Temple leaders have commented on the community's socially eclectic atmosphere due to its inclusion of people from various ethnic and religious backgrounds.
