= Daihachi =

- Gender: Male

Origin
- Origin: Japanese
- Meaning: Different meanings depending on the kanji used

Daihachi (written: 大八) is a masculine Japanese given name. Notable people with the name include:

- Daihachi Oguchi (小口 大八; 1924–2008), Japanese drummer
- Daihachi Yoshida (吉田 大八; born 1963), Japanese film director
