= Isaku Kageyama =

Isaku Kageyama 影山伊作
- Born: December 12, 1981 (age 44); San Francisco
- Origin: Japanese
- Genres: Instrumental
- Occupation: Taiko player
- Instruments: Taiko; Percussion
- Years active: 2006–present
- Labels: Collage Music Arts
- Website: isakukageyama.com

Isaku Kageyama (born December 12, 1981, in San Francisco, United States) is an American musician, composer, producer, and educator, specialized in taiko drums. He is a member of Tokyo-based taiko ensemble called Amanojaku and is a graduate of Berklee College of Music. He is famous for his fusion of traditional Japanese music with jazz, rock and club music, whereby he has collaborated with many jazz artists such as Eric Gravatt, Terumasa Hino, Toshinori Kondo, and Kazutoki Umezu, as well as a wide range of ethnic musicians.

== Early life and education ==
Isaku was born on December 12, 1981, in San Francisco, California. He attended St. Joseph International School in Yokohama, and graduated from International Christian University in 2004 with a BA in international relations. He currently attends Berklee College of Music in Boston, Massachusetts.

== Taiko career ==
He began playing taiko in 1987 under the tutelage of Kenny Endo in Tokyo. In 1989, Isaku joined Amanojaku, where he continued to study taiko skills with Yoichi Watanabe for the next 20 years. From 2006 to 2011, he toured with Amanojaku as one of the principal drummers. In 2011, Isaku entered Berklee College of Music in Boston, where he currently studies percussion and contemporary writing and production. He also collaborated with Yuu Ishizuka, a member of rival group Oedo Sukeroku Taiko.

His style is specific and modern as he plays taiko drums together with electric guitar and electric bass players to form a kind of hard rock or punk music sound.

=== Taiko educator ===
Kageyama teaches taiko at Wellesley College, University of Connecticut, and heads a taiko club at Berklee College of Music. He is the author of "20 Tips to Better Taiko" and has produced an educational CD Jikata.

== Awards and honors ==
Isaku won highest honors at the Mt. Fuji Odaiko Competition in 2000, and the Muroran Taiko Contest in 2003.

== See also ==
- Taiko
- Music of Japan – Taiko
- Kuchi shoga, a system used to "pronounce" taiko sounds.
- Taiko: Drum Master (a.k.a. Taiko no tatsujin) is a series of drumming video games
