= Senshin Buddhist Temple =

Buddhist temple in Los Angeles, California

Religion
- Affiliation: Buddhism
- Region: Buddhist Churches of America
- Leadership: Rev. Ryuta Furumoto
- Status: Active

Location
- Location: Los Angeles, United States
- State: California
- Interactive map of Senshin Buddhist Temple
- Coordinates: 34.0210782°N 118.2980304°W

Architecture
- Completed: 1951

Website
- http://www.senshintemple.org/

The Senshin Buddhist Temple (formerly called the Senshin Buddhist Church) is a Buddhist temple in Los Angeles, California. An affiliate of the Buddhist Churches of America (BCA), the temple was built in 1951. It is known for its maintenance of traditional practices and for cultivating one of the earliest taiko groups appearing in the United States under the leadership of Masao Kodani.

== History ==
The temple was built in 1951 in Los Angeles. Originally called the Senshin Buddhist Church, the institution, like many others, had named itself so due to members wanting to be represented as equal counterparts to members of Christian churches. Its most recent leader, Masao Kodani, encouraged younger Japanese-Americans in the 1970s to explore their ethnic and religious roots through various events coordinated at the temple, such as its annual Obon festival.

The church also fostered one of the earliest taiko groups to appear in the United States, Kinnara Taiko, which formed under the leadership of Masao Kodani between 1968 and 1969 immediately after the celebration of an Obon festival by members. Third-generation Japanese-American members of the church played taiko drum for four hours during the festival. Reportedly, their hands were bleeding afterwards, and collectively, they formed the group known as Kinnara Taiko. Taiko continues to be a routine activity at the church, and some have suggested that it is effective at drawing in third- and fourth-generation Japanese-Americans into the Buddhist faith.
