= Sawagi Taiko =

- Origin: Vancouver, British Columbia, Canada
- Genres: taiko
- Years active: 1990–present
- Website: sawagitaiko.com

Sawagi Taiko, founded in Vancouver, British Columbia, Canada, was the first all-female kumidaiko (taiko) group in Canada. It was founded by a group of women from Katari Taiko, the first Canadian kumidaiko group, and all of its members are exclusively Asian. As an offshoot of Katari Taiko, Sawagi considers San Jose Taiko an inspiration. Sawagi plays to empower Asian women from Asia, more specifically seeking to reject the "stereotypes of Asians as quiet and hardworking but basically mechanical and uncreative." Over the years, Sawagi has performed in support of AIDS organizations, First Nations groups, and Asian Canadian, women's and LGBTQ communities. Sawagi finds inspiration in the Chicago blues, occasionally including electric bass and vocal improvisation in their songs, as well as Japanese folk songs, and rap. Sawagi writes and arranges most of their compositions/dance's, some of which involve skits and vocals.

== Background ==
Sawagi was founded in Vancouver, Canada in 1990. All of its founding members were originally members of Katari Taiko, the first taiko group in Canada (founded in 1979).

In 1989, the women of Katari Taiko were approached after performing at the Vancouver Folk Music Festival and invited to perform in the Michigan Womyn's Music Festival. The festival was for women and their young sons only, so accepting the offer required leaving part of the group behind while the women performed in Michigan. While some women did not approve of excluding the men in the group, a number of the women decided that it sounded exciting and traveled to Michigan for the performance. Upon returning, one of the male members of Katari voiced his anger at the women for agreeing to perform when certain members of the group were explicitly forbidden from participating. After this, the members of Katari decided that they would never accept an invitation to perform that excluded any of its members.

However, the women who had performed at the Michigan Womyn’s Music Festival enjoyed their trip and had received very positive feedback after their performance. They decided to form a new, all-women’s group with the sole purpose of performing at the festival the next year and avoid future conflicts. This new group became Sawagi, a Japanese word suggested by one of the founding members meaning “Commotion.”

In order to stay on good terms with Katari, Sawagi needed to create a completely new repertoire. As a result, Sawagi’s repertoire is primarily made up of original compositions.

== Today ==
Initially Sawagi members only expected to play women’s festivals, but as the number of taiko groups in Vancouver increased, Sawagi decided to expand their purpose and accept invitations to perform at other events. Sawagi periodically holds workshops to recruit new members. Sawagi members also volunteer at the annual Japanese Canadian community festival, the Powell Street Festival.

== Charter Members ==
Founding Members:

- Joyce Chong
- Alisa Kage
- Eileen Kage
- Leslie Komori
- Lisa Mah
- Sachigo Yamaguchi
- Linda Uyehara Hoffman

Current Charter Members:

- Catlin Renay
- Lisa Mah
- Linda Uyehara Hoffman
- Sachiko Yamaguchi
- Mariko Heidelk
- Jeanie Ow
- Helen Kang
- Anita Yung (on leave)
