= Mark Miyoshi =

Japanese-American taiko maker

Mark Miyoshi is a Japanese-American taiko maker. He is the owner and principal craftsman at Miyoshi Daiko, based in Mt. Shasta, California.

== Early life ==
Mark Miyoshi was born and raised in Greeley, Colorado. He attended the University of Colorado at Boulder where he was active in the Asian American Equal Opportunity Program (EOP).

== Denver Taiko ==
Miyoshi is a founding member of Denver Taiko, the fourth taiko group in North America. In 1976, Denver Taiko started out with a dozen members and only two homemade drums donated by the Japanese American Association, so Miyoshi and the others learned how to make their own drums with the help of San Jose Taiko and Kinnara Taiko. Miyoshi left Denver Taiko in 1978 and moved to California.

== Drum Making ==
In 1982, Miyoshi received his first commission from Denver Taiko for an okedo, the first okedo to be made in the United States. Miyoshi is also the first North American Taiko maker to laminate staves with finger joints and carve out the interior of the nagodo in order to improve the quality of the sound.

In the mid-1980s, Miyoshi began to make taiko full-time. He currently is the owner and principal craftsman at Miyoshi Daiko. Miyoshi Daiko produces Nagado, Shime-Daiko, Okedo-Daiko, Hira-Daiko and Uchi-wa Daiko in all sizes.

Miyoshi has made taiko for San Jose Taiko, Shasta Taiko, Kenny Endo, Chizuko Endo, Denver Taiko, Portland Taiko, Ondekoza, Stanford Taiko as well as many other North American and international taiko groups.

He has also taken on various apprentices including Shoji Kameda.

A set of Miyoshi's taiko is on display in the Musical Instrument Museum in Phoenix, Arizona.

== Philosophy ==
Miyoshi believes that, “Drums from all traditions have a spirit that is alive and vibrant. This spirit comes alive through the joining of wood, skins, metal and other materials that come from the trees, plants, animals and the earth…When all of these elements come into harmony and relationship, with good thoughts and actions, a new life is brought into the world.” He brings this philosophy to drum building, and each Miyoshi taiko is made with respect for the raw materials and closed with a prayer.

== National Endowment for the Arts ==
In 1989, Miyoshi was awarded a US/Japan Friendship Commission fellowship by the National Endowment for the Arts to study the art of taiko making in Japan.
