= Buddhists in the United States military =

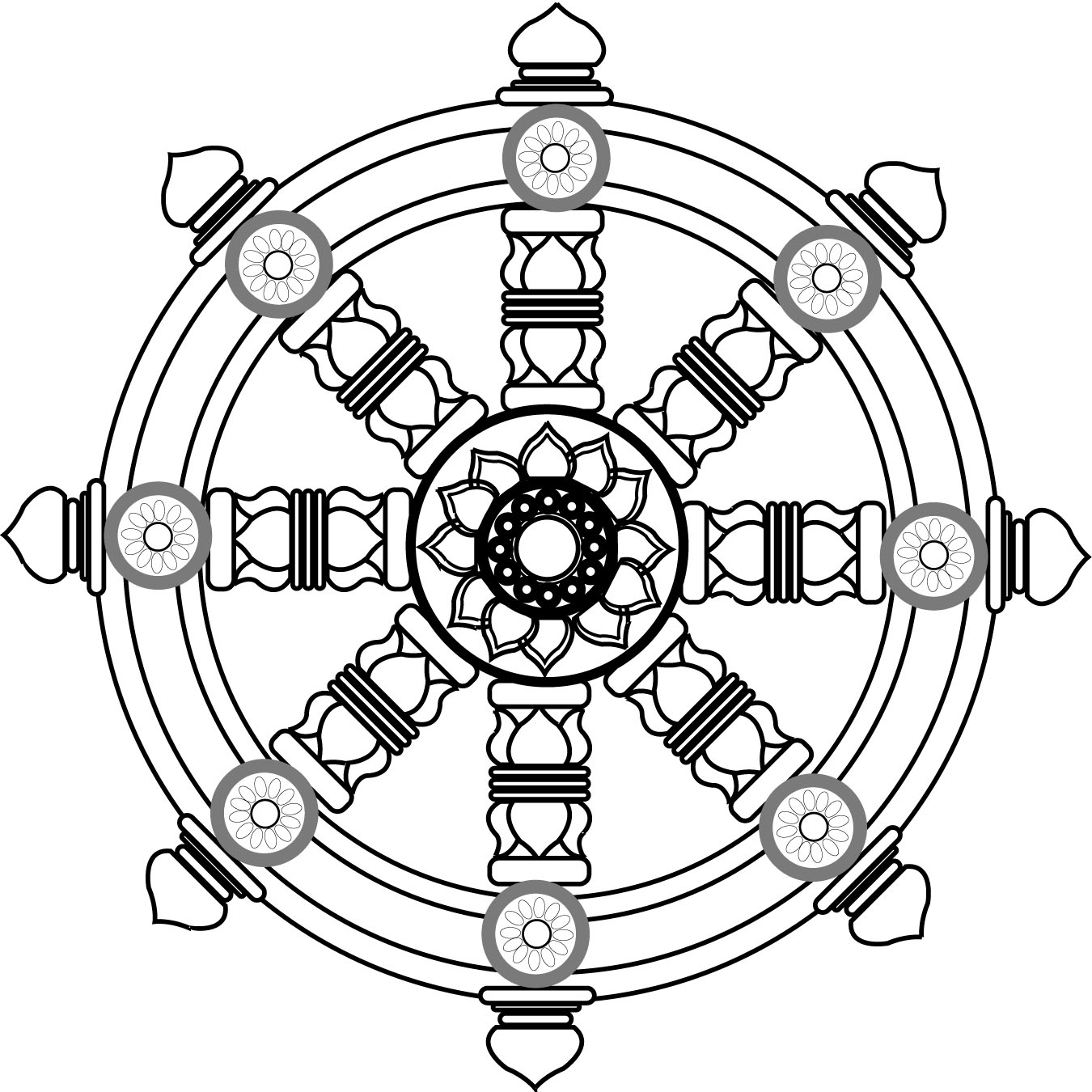
Insignia of Buddhist chaplains of the United States Air Force

Buddhists make up a small percentage of the United States military, with a 2009 article stating that only 5,287 of 1.4 million military personnel identified themselves as Buddhists.

As popular Western understandings of Buddhism often involve the belief that Buddhists practice pacifism, some people have commented on the apparent discord between the religion and military service. A Buddhist program leader at the United States Air Force Academy stated in an interview: "The questions of Buddhism are the questions of life and death. So, where else would you want Buddhism than right there where those questions are most vivid?" Other reasons for Buddhists in the military may include an increase over time in the population of Asian-Americans practicing authentic Buddhist traditions whose relationship to violence and war is more complex than the stereotype, and individuals who embrace Buddhist beliefs while already committed to a term of military service.

== History ==
Among the earliest Buddhists to serve in number in the US military were the Nisei Japanese Americans. A 1944 service for 50 soldiers at Fort Snelling is believed to be the first Buddhist service ever delivered in an army installation in the United States. A majority of Nisei troops were Buddhist, one estimate states half the Nisei troops of the 442nd Infantry Regiment and the Military Intelligence Service, and many Nisei linguists serving in the MIS had studied Japanese at Buddhist-run schools in the United States. However, Nisei units such as the 442nd were only permitted Christian chaplains; Assistant Secretary of Defense John J. McCloy feared that negative American perceptions of Buddhists would compromise the reputation of the unit.

Following World War II, the denotation "B" for Buddhist became an allowed option on American dog-tags.

On September 11th 2022, a Buddhist pennant was flown on an underway Navy ship for the first time, as Navy Chaplain Lt. Saejeong Kim presided over services on the USS McFaul.

== Chaplains ==
In 1990, the American military first resolved to make plans for inclusion of Buddhists chaplains in the armed forces; in August of that year Institute of Heraldry produced a rank insignia, based on the dharmachakra emblem.

The first Buddhist chaplain in the United States Department of Defense was Lieutenant Junior Grade Jeanette Gracie Shin, commissioned in 2004. Shin, a former enlisted Marine, graduated with a Master of Arts degree in Buddhist Studies from the Graduate Theological Union/Institute of Buddhist Studies located in Berkeley, California. The first Buddhist chaplain in the United States Army was former Southern Baptist Thomas Dyer, appointed in 2008. Buddhist chaplains are endorsed by the Buddhist Churches of America.

== Chapel ==
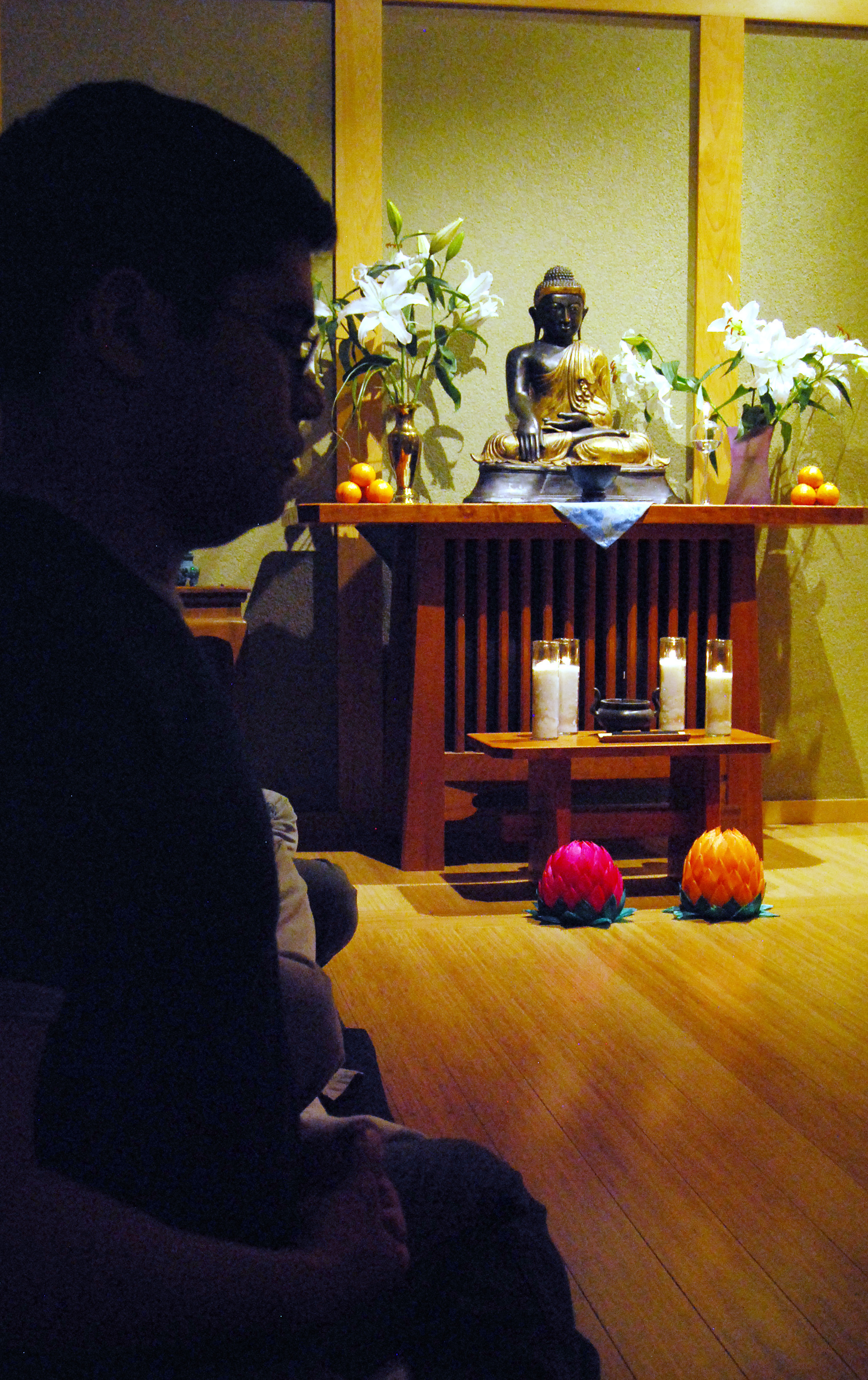

As of 2009, there was only one official dedicated Buddhist chapel in the United States military, located in the basement of the United States Air Force Academy Cadet Chapel, which also houses Catholic, Protestant, and Jewish chapels. The Buddhist chapel was constructed in 2005, and a 2009 report stated that at the chapel's Wednesday services "about half of the 18 pillows on the floor are usually occupied."
