= Daihachi Oguchi =

- Born: February 27, 1924; Japan
- Died: June 27, 2008 (aged 84) Japan
- Occupation: Drummer
- Instruments: Drums, taiko
- Formerly of: Osuwa Daiko

Daihachi Oguchi (小口 大八, Oguchi Daihachi; February 27, 1924 – June 27, 2008) was a Japanese drummer best known for popularizing taiko.

Master Japanese drummer Daihachi Oguchi is credited with inventing kumi-daiko, the taiko ensemble, in 1951. After founding his own ensemble, Osuwa Daiko, he led the spread of modern Taiko throughout Japan and the U.S.

A former jazz drummer, Daihachi Oguchi took ancient rhythms, broke them down and created new arrangements and compositions to accommodate an ensemble of drummers. One day, he was asked to interpret an old sheet of taiko music for Suwa Shrine, which was found in an old warehouse. The sheet music was written in an old Japanese notation and he could not understand it at first. He found an old man who had performed the tune, and then he succeeded in interpreting it at last. However, as a jazz player, the rhythm pattern of the tune was too simple for him to play. He wondered why nobody played taiko together. A marvelous idea came across his mind and made him decide to break through the tradition. Inspired by a western drum set, he formed a group in which each player beats a different taiko; in short, he gave the group a function as a drum set. A high-pitched Shime-daiko established a basic rhythm like a snare drum does. A growling Nagado-daiko added accents like a bass drum. His intention was right to the point, and this epoch-making invention changed the taiko music forever.

Oguchi helped turn the traditional form into a dramatic performance spectacle, elevating the traditional folk sounds of taiko to modern music played in concert halls, not just festivals and shrines. The period from 1970s to 1990s in Japan seemed to be the Renaissance of taiko music. The activities of Osuwa Daiko and other early kumi-daiko groups in 1960s, and the taiko performance at the Tokyo Olympics in 1964 ignited the phenomenal taiko boom for next decades.

Mr. Oguchi helped found top taiko groups, including San Francisco Taiko Dojo, which has performed in Hollywood movies and on international tours since forming 40 years ago. Oguchi also led and starred in the performance of drumming and dance at the closing ceremony of the 1998 Nagano Olympics.

"Your heart is a taiko. All people listen to a taiko rhythm dontsuku-dontsuku in their mother's womb," Daihachi Oguchi told The Associated Press at that time. "It's instinct to be drawn to taiko drumming." "In taiko, man becomes the sound. In taiko, you can hear the sound through your skin".

In 2008, Daihachi Oguchi died at age 84 after being hit by a motorist while crossing the street. Oguchi had been scheduled to perform with Kodo, the world-renowned Taiko performance group.
