= UCLA Kyodo Taiko =

American taiko group

UCLA Kyodo Taiko is a collegiate taiko group specializing in taiko drumming. Founded in 1990, Kyodo is the first collegiate taiko group in the country. Kyodo is a Japanese term that means both "family" and "loud children." Many of Kyodo's members are not of Japanese descent.

== History ==
Using his training at San Jose Taiko, Mark Honda founded Kyodo Taiko in 1990 under the Nikkei Student Union (NSU) at the University of California, Los Angeles (UCLA). Originally there was no practice space for the group and no instruments to play. Thus, members of Kyodo practiced “air bachi,” where the players would practice by hitting on an imaginary drum. In the summer of 1991, members of Kyodo built their first four chu-daiko drums, with the help of Tom Endo and Kinnara Taiko's Kevin Higa.

The group gave their first major performance in February 1992 at Royce Hall on the 50th anniversary of the Japanese American internment, wherein 175 UCLA students were interned.

Following Honda's graduation, Kyodo officially separated from the Nikkei Student Union. Subsequently, they began receiving funding, gained permission to utilize the John Wooden Center as their practice space, and garnered support from UCLA. Many members, such as Portland Taiko director Michelle Fujii and Los Angeles Taiko Institute principal Yuta Kato, have gone on to play professionally.

== Performances ==
In 1995, Kyodo participated in the first Intercollegiate Taiko Invitational held at Stanford University with groups such as Jodaiko and Stanford Taiko. Kyodo has subsequently hosted the Invitational.

In 2006, the group was feature in a Mitsubishi commercial with other LA-based groups, TAIKOPROJECT and Koshin Taiko. The ad has been criticized for exotifying Japanese culture but was also heralded as a shift towards mainstream acceptance.

Kyodo often performs at different events around campus, including the Fowler Out Loud evening music series at the Fowler Museum and UCLA Bruins men's basketball games. The group hosts an annual spring concert and are a staple at the NSU Cultural Night.

Kyodo has performed at live events around Los Angeles, such as Nisei Week, the L.A. Tofu Festival, the Lotus Festival, and the First Annual U.S. Sumo Open. They have also performed several times at the Manzanar Pilgrimage, an annual event commemorating the internment of Japanese Americans during the Second World War.

=== Popular songs ===
Other songs of UCLA Kyodo include, “Encore”, composed by Jason Lew (a piece utilizing original rhythm patterns from “Shoshin Wasurebekarazu,” composed by Tamon Norimoto), “Rai”, composed by Ron Peterson (2001), “Tatsu,” composed by Marvin Yee (1992), “Genki,” composed by Shozo Yoshikawa (1999), “Hashire,” composed by Walter Satoshi Tsushima (2001), and “Encore Remix,” composed by Craig Ishii, Jason Osajima, and Christine Kimura (2007).
