= Gojinjo-daiko =

Japanese drum

Gojinjo-daiko (御陣乗太鼓) is a Japanese drum which has been selected as part of Wajima City’s cultural heritage (1961) and an Ishikawa Prefecture’s intangible cultural heritage (1963).

Playing gojinjo-daiko is strictly restricted to residents of Nafune, a small village in Wajima City, where only 250 people live, making it very rare to see a live drum performance.

== Origin ==
The origin of the gojinjo-daiko dates back to 1577 when the warlord Uesugi Kenshin invaded Noto Province. As the local people were unarmed, they resisted by beating war drums and wore ferocious looking devil masks with seaweed and bark on their heads in a bid to scare off their enemies. The low sound of drums associated with the rumbling of the earth and caused Uesugi Kenshin and his soldiers to retreat.
