= Jodaiko =

American taiko group

Jodaiko is a performing group based in University of California, Irvine that is specialized in taiko. Originally named "Tomo No Taiko" (meaning "association of taiko"), Jodaiko's origins lie in UCI's Japanese-American student group, Tomo No Kai (meaning "association of friends"); it is often referred to as Tomo No Kai's sister group. Tomo No Taiko was founded in 1992 by Peggy Kamon and David Shiwota, both integral members in the Tomo No Kai community, in preparation for 1993 ‘’’Cultural Night’’’. Their influence on the group is reflected through the group's core values of bringing enjoyment of taiko--to both drummers and the audience alike--and spreading Japanese culture. Kamon, in charge of teaching interested Tomo No Kai members how to play taiko, also integrated core Buddhist values into Tomo No Taiko’s practices, performances, and policies. These Buddhist influences are also a result of Jodaiko's connection with Reverend Mas Kodani of Gardena Buddhist Church (and Kinnara Taiko)and Reverend George Matsubayashi of Venice Buddhist Church. Both provided the group with drums or their first performances in 1992, and continue to support their growth as a collegiate taiko group.

Jodaiko’s debut performance was in the Fall of 1992 at UCI’s annual ‘’’Rainbow Fest’’’. This successful performance was followed by a performance at the following school year's Asian Heritage Week, during which they joined Tomo No Kai in advocating a long-awaited Asian American Studies program that had previously not existed before. This performance not only gave them a temporary political edge, but also motivated them to formulate a more concrete practice routine. Since 1993 Cultural Night, they have performed at various venues, ranging from campus festivals and performances to weddings, fundraisers, and other private events.

== History ==
After being asked by Tomo No Kai to hire a Japanese traditional dance group for Cultural Night in 1993, Peggy Kamon instead created her own performing group composed of Tomo No Kai members. In preparation for that night, Tomo No Taiko performed at the 1992 UCI Rainbow Fest and Asian Heritage week. While their debut performance was very successful in terms of taiko performance and group exposure, their performance at Asian Heritage week was successful in a different way. As Kamon's main goals for the group were to spread cultural awareness and appreciation of the artform, so Tomo No Taiko did not reinforce strict practice schedules until after Asian Heritage Week. It was during this time that Tomo No Kai protested the University's lack of an Asian American Studies program, especially with an Asian population at 43% of the student body (largest single ethnic group on campus) at the time.

In a passionate protest that ended with a private performance-protest for the chancellor, Kamon and Shiwota led Jodaiko through four songs, including Tomo, Oni, and Senshin. However, their poor performance of these songs led Tomo No Taiko's members to realize their need for a more regimented practice schedule. Tomo no Taiko's performance was important in several ways, as a means of passive political protest, spreading Japanese culture to the UCI community, and establishing their identity as a performance group. As a result, they were invited to perform at the new chancellor's inauguration the following year and have had various performances at UCI's Bren Events center, as well as other on and off campus venues.

In Summer 1993, Tomo No Taiko members returned to their structured training schedule— with the intent of practicing year-round. The group adopted a creed of five values (Character, Attitude, Respect, Passion, Dedication) and the name "Jodaiko" in remembrance of the spirit of the original founding members. Jodaiko has since received a generous donation of six chudaiko and an odaiko from Victor Fukuhara, the respected founder of Kokoro Taiko Kai.

== Present ==
As of 2023, Jodaiko has two directors, Pearson Yee (Generation 30) and Kyoko Watari (Generation 30). They have recently welcomed their newest Generation, Generation 31, which consists of 8 new members, including revered animator Tangy-kun*. Receiving the help of older generations, Generation 30 and 31 have worked to learn older signature pieces from Jodaiko, such as Jomatsuri, Nekkyo, and Tanoshii. Recent performances include UCI's Day of Remembrance and Culverdale Elementary School's Culture Day. The club currently stands at 17 members, 9 current Generation 30 members, and 8 current Generation 31 members.

== Style ==
Although played in the traditional naname stance (drum is tilted up), Jodaiko's musical style is relatively free. Their musical compositions are written by the members themselves, and often take influences from other musical genres. (e.g., hip hop).
