= Midwest Buddhist Temple Ginza Holiday Festival =

Annual Japanese cultural festival in Chicago

The Midwest Buddhist Temple Ginza Holiday Festival is an annual Japanese cultural festival that occurs on the second weekend, Friday to Sunday, of August at 435 W. Menomonee Street in Chicago’s historic Old Town. The annual event has been since 1955, except for a three-year break from 2020 due to the COVID-19 pandemic. It will be held August 11–13, 2023.

Exhibits feature Japanese items, such as Japanese dry goods and snacks, kimono, jewelry, art and Japanese cuisine, including teriyaki, udon sushi, edamame, and kintoki (Japanese snow cone topped with sweet azuki beans). Beer, sake and wine are also available.

Stage performances include taiko drumming, folk dances, martial arts demonstrations, and other entertainment and exhibits.

The temple is open for guests who are interested in observing the service area and learning the basics of Buddhism. During stage intermissions, there are short Dharma talks given inside the Temple by Rev. Ron Miyamura.
