= San Francisco Taiko Dojo =

Taiko group in the United States

San Francisco Taiko Dojo, founded in 1968 by Grand Master Seiichi Tanaka, was the first taiko group in North America, and has been seen as the primary link between the Japanese and North American branches of the art form. Additionally, Tanaka's belief that learning to play taiko only requires a genuine interest in the art form (rather than Japanese ethnicity or heritage), has greatly contributed to taiko's success and growth outside Japan.

== Roots of "Tanaka Style" (History and Guiding Principles) ==
=== Tanaka's background ===
The dojo has been under the leadership of Tanaka-Sensei since he founded it in 1968. Therefore, to understand SFTD's style, one must first understand "Tanaka style".

Tanaka was born, raised, and educated in Japan. Not long after he graduated from Chiba University of Commerce (in 1964), Tanaka came to the United States for the first time (in 1967). While in San Francisco, Tanaka attended the annual Cherry Blossom Festival in San Francisco Japantown. He was somewhat disappointed, however, because it was missing "noise"; the drumming that he was used to hearing at every important occasion in Japan did not exist in San Francisco. Tanaka decided that he would be the one to bring taiko to North America and "make noise just like a Japanese festival".

Although he had received some basic taiko training in his home town, he had not received any of professional quality, so he returned to Japan and asked to become the apprentice of Grand Master Daihachi Oguchi (the man who combined traditional Japanese drum rhythms with a jazz influence to create the first ensemble taiko group, Osuwa Daiko). Tanaka became the first of Oguchi's apprentices from outside of the family, and after working hard to learn the principles of the art form, he returned to San Francisco to play in the 1968 Cherry Blossom Festival. Later that year, he opened the San Francisco Taiko Dojo.

However, that initial training with Oguchi-Sensei is not the only influence contributing to the style of San Francisco Taiko Dojo. Tanaka has also trained with Master Susumu Kowase of the more modern Sukeroku Taiko in Tokyo (known for being the first "professional" taiko group, and the group that first played taiko on slant stands), as well as Grand Master Shosaku Ikeda, of the more traditional Gojinjo Daiko (which has been recognized as an Indigenous National Treasure). Tanaka has also trained in hogaku (traditional music of Kabuki dance and Noh drama) under Grand Master Sasazo Kineya, in yokobue (bamboo flute) under Master Kiyohiko Fukuhara, and in martial arts (including Shorinji Kenpo, Nihon-den Kenpo and Tsurugi) under Grand Master Tadao Okuyuma.

All of these elements come together to give San Francisco Taiko Dojo that distinct "Tanaka style", which that allows audience members of an SFTD performance to not only hear the drums, but feel and be moved by them as well.

=== Dojo ideals ===
While playing taiko, a player is expected to show the following four characteristics: shin/kokoro (spirit: self-control and playing from the heart), gi/waza (action: musicianship, skill, and technique), tai/karada (body: physical strength and endurance), and rei(etiquette: respect, courtesy and unity).

In staying true to these principles and passing them on to others, Tanaka embraces any chance to work with a new person or group, and will not turn down a potential student because of that person's gender, ethnicity or past. However, students must be willing to put in the effort to follow through in all of the above principles. Tanaka is reported to never stop pushing students so that they are always improving, because taiko is not about the end goal of mastering the art form (the art form is constantly evolving, so this goal is not practical anyway); instead, taiko is about the journey.

These ideals are not unique to San Francisco Taiko Dojo, but Tanaka follows and impresses them upon his students more than many others, such that new players or groups are often introduced to them and made aware of their power because of Tanaka or SFTD, whether directly (maybe through a workshop with Tanaka or one of his past students) or indirectly (possibly after being moved by one of SFTD's performances).

== Repertoire ==
SFTD plays original songs ("Tsunami", "Sokobayashi", and "California Wind") composed by Tanaka. However, the group's repertoire also includes songs from, or strongly influenced by, other groups, partially because, as mentioned above, Tanaka studied and became a skilled player of these styles and was therefore granted permission to play them outside Japan.

Other pieces performed by SFTD perform include:

- "Yodan Uchi" and variations, "Shiraume Taiko" and variations (including "Matsuri Daiko") from Sukeroku Taiko of Tokyo
- "Hiryu Sandan Gaeshi" and "Isami Goma" from Osuwa Taiko of Nagano Prefecture, Japan
- "Shichome" and "Nimba" ("Shishi Mai", or "Lion Dance", accompaniment)
- "Hachijo Daiko" (rhythms from Hachijo Island)
- "Yataibayashi" (Chichibu Yomatsuri)
- "Oni Daiko" (or "Demon Drumming")

Retired piece "Space Noto" (a variation of Gojinjo Daiko of Noto Peninsula).

== Discography ==
San Francisco Taiko Dojo has released 5 albums:

- Sounds Space Soul (released in 1983)
- Inori (released in 1991)
- Tsunami (released in 1997)
- Sacred Drum (released in 1999)
- Live at Cherry Blossom (released in 2015)

Music from the group has also been featured on the soundtracks of the movies below.

== Noteworthy Events/Performances ==
Tanaka and San Francisco Taiko Dojo have been featured in four motion pictures: Apocalypse Now (Francis Ford Coppola, 1978), Return of the Jedi (George Lucas, 1982), The Right Stuff (Philip Kaufman, 1983), and Rising Sun (Philip Kaufman, 1993).

The group was also the subject of a KQED special in March 2005.

Tanaka and SFTD have had many other collaborations and performances with artists outside of Taiko, as well. These include the original Temptations in 1971; jazz drummer Art Blakey in 1975; Bobby McFerrin, Linda Ronstadt and the San Francisco Ballet in the first AID and Comfort Benefit (1987); Max Roach, Tito Puente, Mario Bauza, and Babatunde Olatunji at the first annual Sacred Drum concert in 1990; Dave Brubeck to celebrate the 50th anniversary of the Treaty of Peace with Japan in 2001; and Omulu Capoeira in Dancing Thunder (1995).

Other important performances include:
In 1968, Seiichi Tanaka made his debut appearance as the only drummer in the San Francisco Cherry Blossom Festival. In 1975, Seiichi Tanaka was requested for a command performance by Emperor Hirohito in San Francisco, and San Francisco Taiko Dojo went on its first international taiko tour, to Mexico. In 1976, SFTD toured in France, Switzerland, Austria, and Japan. In 1978, SFTD held its first self-produced concert to celebrate San Francisco Taiko Dojo's 10th anniversary. In 1981, the first Japan-US Taiko Festival included Grand Master Daihachi Oguchi and Osuwa Daiko. In 1984, SFTD performed at the MLB All-Star Game Celebration in San Francisco. In 1985, Seiichi Tanaka performed at the Tsukuba World Expo in Japan, and SFTD held its first self-produced concert outside Japantown at the Palace of Fine Arts. In 1990, SFTD performed at the Nelson Mandela Freedom Celebration at the Oakland Coliseum. In 1994, SFTD performed at New York's Carnegie Hall. In 1995, SFTD performed at both the Tikotin Museum of Japanese Art opening in Haifa, Israel, and the Hiroshima 50th Anniversary Commemoration in Japan. In 1998, SFTD performed at Visa International's Nagano Winter Olympics celebration and at the Japanese Immigration to Cuba Centennial Celebration in Havana, Cuba.

== Youth Group: Rising Stars ==
The Rising Stars youth classes began at San Francisco Taiko Dojo in 1992 with children as young as 6 or 7 years old, and after joining, many of its members continued to receive instruction from Tanaka through the program for over 10 years. They have performed in Japan as well as across the United States, and they are reported to be "one of the finest Taiko youth groups in the country, and the most disciplined and traditionally trained Taiko youth group in the world".

== Influence on taiko ==
Having been around for over 40 years, San Francisco Taiko Dojo has had a large impact on the taiko community. Two of the main mechanisms by which this occurs are 1. many of SFTD's former students have started their own taiko groups over the years, taking what they learned from the dojo with them, and 2. Tanaka has influenced many other taiko groups through workshops.

Below are some former students who have started their own groups:

- Kenny Endo (Kenny Endo Taiko Ensemble & Kenny Endo Contemporary Ensemble)
- Russel Baba & Jeanne Mercer (Shasta Taiko)
- Tiffany Tamaribuchi (Sacramento Taiko Dan & JO-Daiko)
- Liz Berg (Taiko Maine Dojo)
- Bruce "Mui" Ghent (Maikaze Daiko)
- Yuri Morita & Susan Horn (Emeryville Taiko)
- Hiroshi Koshiyama and Naomi Guilbert (Fubuki Daiko)

Below are some taiko groups that have had workshops with Tanaka:

- Soh Daiko had two week-long workshops with Tanaka-sensei after encouragement from Russel Baba.
- Katari Taiko asked Tanaka-Sensei to give them a workshop in winter of 1979.

This influence has even reached back to Japan. In 1993, Unosuke Miyamoto ("drum maker to the Emperor") founded Nihon Taiko Dojo in Tokyo based on the teachings and philosophy of Seiichi Tanaka and San Francisco Taiko Dojo.
