= Johnny Mori =

- Born: November 30, 1949 (age 76); Utah
- Occupations: Musician, arts educator/administrator

Johnny Mori is a third-generation (Sansei) Japanese American musician and arts educator/administrator from Los Angeles. He was one of the seminal members of the taiko group Kinnara Taiko and the original taiko drummer for the Grammy nominated jazz-fusion band Hiroshima.

== Personal life ==
Mori was born in 1949 in Salt Lake City, Utah. He grew up in a primarily Japanese American community in southwest Los Angeles and attended Los Angeles High School. He formerly worked as the general manager of the Aratani/ Japan America Theatre at the Japanese American Cultural and Community Center (JACCC) in Los Angeles.

== Taiko ==
Mori was surrounded by taiko from his childhood days, often seeing taiko being performed at Obon Festivals in Los Angeles and around Southern California. It wasn't until much later that Mori would begin playing taiko. In 1969, Reverend Masao "Mas" Kodani founded Kinnara Taiko, the second kumi-daiko group to be founded in North America. Kodani, Mori and the other seminal members of Kinnara Taiko are credited with pioneering the technique of reusing old barrels to make taiko. This innovation is one of the primary reasons for the spread of taiko in North America. Mori was also featured in the documentary Big Drum Taiko in the United States for his major contributions to North American taiko.

A few years later, in 1973, Mori partnered up with the members of the band Hiroshima for a jam session. It was this jam session that led to the band inviting him as their taiko player. Hiroshima became a hit with their fusion of Japanese music and other world music into their songs. Hiroshima's debut album, self-titled Hiroshima was released five years later in 1979. The band was featured in a documentary in 1976 entitled Crusin' J-Town and also wrote an original song titled "The Moon is a Window to Heaven" for the 1989 film Star Trek V: The Final Frontier.

After retiring from the band in 2004, Mori is still heavily involved in the taiko community.

== Works ==
- Hiroshima (Arista/BMG) 1979
- Odori (Razor & Tie/BMG) 1980
- Third Generation (Epic/CBS) 1983
- Another Place (Epic/CBS) 1985
- Go (Epic/CBS) 1987
- East (Epic/CBS) 1989
- Providence (Epic/SME) 1992
- L.A. (Qwest/Reprise/Warner Bros.) 1994
- Urban World Music (Qwest/Warner Bros.) 1996
- Between Black and White (Windham Hill/BMG) 1999
- The Bridge (Heads Up) 2003
