= Osuwa Daiko =

- Logo for Osuwa Daiko

Background information
- Origin: Okaya, Nagano Prefecture, Japan
- Genres: Taiko
- Years active: 1951-present
- Website: www.osuwadaiko.com

Osuwa Daiko (御諏訪太鼓) is a Japanese percussion group credited as the earliest groups to develop and perform the ensemble-style of taiko called kumi-daiko. Formed in Okaya, Japan in 1951 and founded by Daihachi Oguchi, Osuwa Daiko created a style of performance independent from performance during festivals, theatrical performance, and religious ceremonies, and transformed them into an ensemble performance. Contemporary taiko performance in Japan and in the rest of the world is widely based on the practices of Osuwa Daiko.

== History ==
Osuwa Daiko was founded by Daihachi Oguchi in 1951 in Nagano Prefecture, who was inspired by his background as a jazz drummer and was interested in expanding the scope of percussion traditions in Japan. Although taiko drums had existed for several centuries beforehand, Osuwa Daiko was the first to use several, differently-sized drums in an ensemble format. This was in contrast to taiko performances that often accompanied theatrical performances such as gagaku or Buddhist ceremonies like Obon, though these styles influenced Osuwa Daiko's performance work.

Many of the initial performers in Osuwa Daiko were not professional musicians, and so parts were partitioned out across different drums into simpler rhythms for individuals to play. For instance, the shime-daiko, a high-pitched drum, carried the role of keeping the tempo. Several styles of medium-sized drums were used to play the "melody" of the piece and also incorporated phrasing. A large o-daiko, using a simple rhythm, established a pulse for the rest of performers. Each performer was also equipped with several different drums at once, similar to a jazz drum set.

One main goals of the group was to transform traditional taiko pieces performed at local festivals and temples into an ensemble format. After World War II, the Japanese cultural identity had been considerably weakened as a result of their defeat as well as through the incorporation of Western cultural values. However, Oguchi's reformulated pieces, based on pieces traditionally reserved for festivals and religious ceremonies, were a way to recultivate and redefine Japanese culture and identity.

Initially, performances by the group were restricted to regional venues such as inns and sometimes hotels in Japan. Osuwa Daiko started to become more visible later in the 1950s. Televised performances of the group were shown on NHK, one of the major television networks in Japan. Osuwa Daiko, and taiko performance in general, also gained international attention when they were featured at the 1964 Winter Olympics. This televised performance also popularized taiko performance locally in Japan.

== Impact ==
In the development of taiko performance in an ensemble format, Osuwa Daiko has been considered one of the dominant, leading groups in Japan. Specifically, their style of instrumentation, presentation on stage, kata, and repertoire of pieces have largely contributed to how contemporary taiko is understood and practiced. In addition, Osuwa Daiko is known for its activity in training and teaching of other taiko groups in terms of technique and repertoire, particularly newer groups.
