= Kenny Endo =

American musician and taiko master

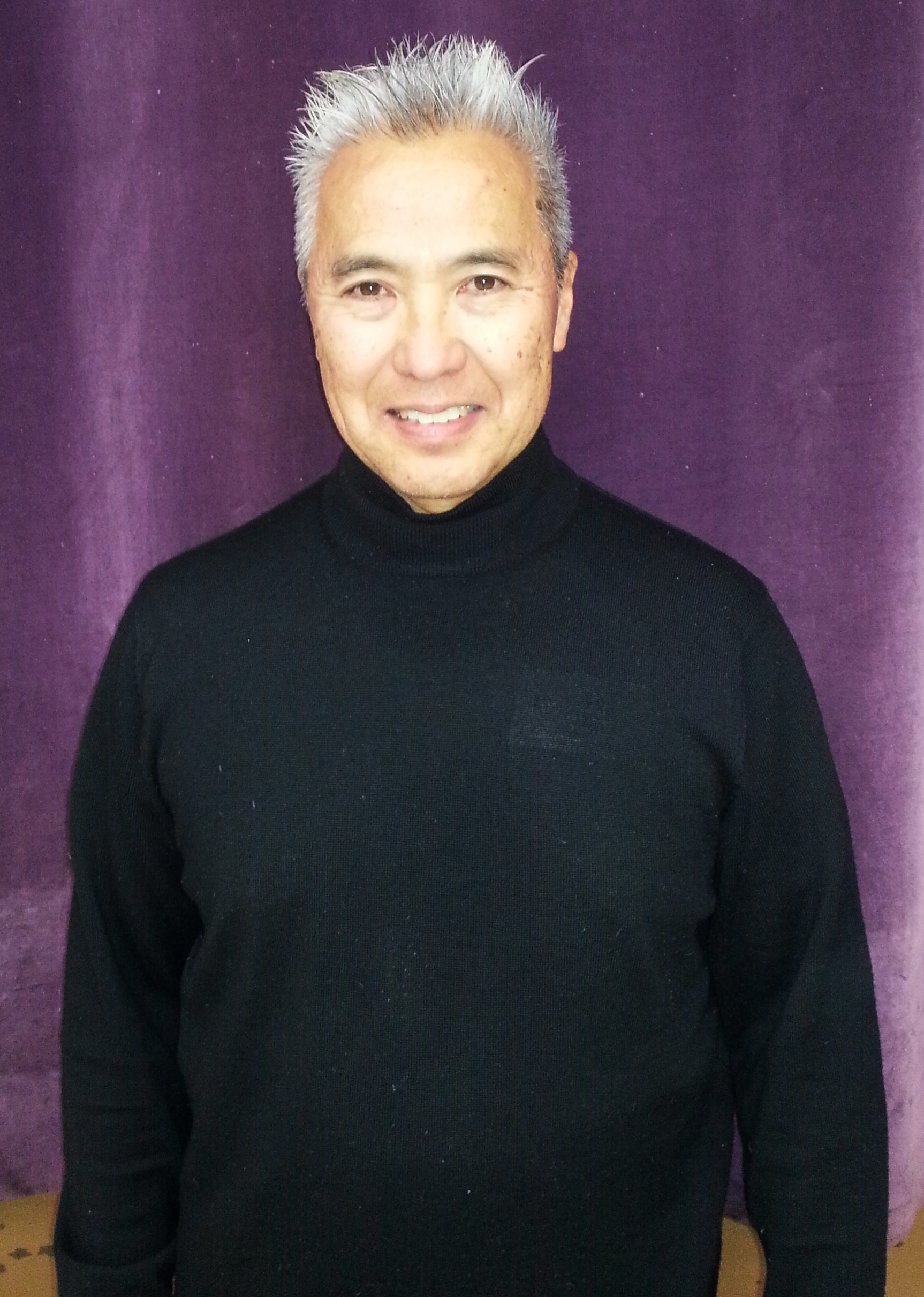
- Born: April 2, 1953 (age 73); Los Angeles, California, U.S.
- Occupation: Musician
- Known for: Taiko

Kenny Endo (born April 2, 1953) is an American taiko performer, composer, and educator. He is the artistic director of several taiko ensembles and tours regularly performing both traditional and contemporary works. Endo is the first non-Japanese national to receive a natori (professional stage name) in hogaku hayashi, the classical Japanese performing art found in Kabuki and Nagauta. Endo performs composes as a solo artist, with his ensembles, and in collaboration with other artists from diverse genres.

== Early life and education ==
Kenny Endo was born on April 2, 1953, in Los Angeles, California, to Japanese American parents--an Issei (first generation) father and a Nisei (second generation) mother. He grew up in Los Angeles with one brother and three sisters, and was exposed to elements of Japanese culture while being raised primarily in an American environment. From an early age, he developed an interest in percussion and began playing drums at age nine. During middle school and high school, he performed in school bands and orchestras, and also played his own drum set.

Endo attended the University of California, Santa Cruz before transferring to UCLA where he studied Political Science and Ethnomusicology. In 1973, while still a college student, he participated in a six-month field study on a Native American reservation in Arizona, the site of the former Poston War Relocation Center, the largest Japanese-American incarceration camp during WWII. The experience was a turning point in his life and prompted him to explore his Japanese American heritage more deeply.

That same year, Endo was introduced to kumidaiko (ensemble taiko drumming) after attending a performance by the San Francisco Taiko Dojo perform in San Jose. Inspired by the performance, he decided to pursue taiko seriously. In 1975, he joined Kinnara Taiko, one of the earliest taiko ensembles in North America, based at the Senshin Buddhist Temple in Los Angeles.

== Career ==
However, at the time Kinnara Taiko was only playing during the Obon festival season, and Endo wanted more practice. He consequently spent a summer studying with Seiichi Tanaka and the San Francisco Taiko Dojo (SFTD), and, after finishing school at the University of California, Los Angeles in 1976, he moved to San Francisco to continue working with SFTD. While there, he studied taiko by day and worked as a jazz musician by night. Up until this point in his life, Endo had been heavily influenced by his love of all music, especially rock and jazz. In 1979, he had to make the choice of whether to continue studying taiko and move to Japan, or to pursue jazz seriously and move to New York City. He chose taiko, which combined his interest in drums and music and his desire to get back to his cultural roots, and, in 1980, Endo moved to Japan to study the roots of the art form. The trip, which was originally intended to be for one year, resulted in ten.

While in Japan Endo studied and mastered three types of Japanese drumming: kumi-daiko (group drumming), hogaku hayashi (classical drumming), and matsuri bayashi (festival music). He started by playing in a group called O Suwa Daiko for six months before moving to Tokyo at the end of 1980. While in Tokyo, he studied with Sukeroku Taiko, and when Sukeroku Taiko split into two groups in 1982, Endo joined Oedo Sukeroku Taiko, with which he remained with until 1987. Endo also began to do freelance work and duets in 1983, and by 1987 he had gone solo, continuing his studies and composing his own taiko music. Also while in Japan, Endo received a natori (stage name) in hogaku hayashi, Japanese classical drumming. Natori literally means “to take on a name,” and it functions as both a name to perform under and a license to teach. Endo was the first ever foreigner to receive the high honor of a natori in the field of hogaku hayashi. His stage name is Mochizuki Tajiro.

After spending ten years in Japan, Endo applied for and was granted a scholarship through the East-West Center at the University of Hawaii (UH). In 1990, he moved to Honolulu, Hawaii, with his wife, Chizuko Endo, and two sons (Miles and Zen), to pursue graduate studies at UH in Ethnomusicology and to document his studies in Japan. While there, the university asked him to teach, and Endo began teaching taiko classes through the non-credit program at UH. The program quickly grew, and soon became too large of a capacity for the UH non-credit program. In 1994, Kenny and Chizuko moved the classes off campus and eventually to the chapel on the site of Kapiolani Community College. This was the beginning of Taiko Center of the Pacific (TCP), a school of traditional and contemporary Japanese drumming which offers public classes to people of all ages and abilities, starting from age 2 through seniors, and also a class for the Deaf and Hard of Hearing.

== Music ==
Currently Endo has two main performing groups: The Taiko Center of the Pacific Performing Ensemble (TCP, formerly the Kenny Endo Taiko Ensemble aka KETE) and the Kenny Endo Contemporary Ensemble. The Kenny Endo Taiko Ensemble was started around 1991, and today has 3 groups: one based in Japan, one in Hawaii, and one on the mainland US. TCP plays mainly kumidaiko (ensemble drumming), and splits its time between performing pieces composed by Endo, and pieces composed by group members and former group members. The Contemporary Ensemble “performs original works combining taiko with melodic and other instruments such as koto, yokobue (Japanese transverse bamboo flute), vibraphone, drumset, shamisen and various other melodic instruments. The contemporary ensemble serves as Endo’s experimental group.

== Collaborations and awards ==
Kenny Endo has worked with numerous artists on many distinguished projects. His works include, but are not limited to, opening for The Who, performing a duet with singer Bobby McFerrin, performing for Michael Jackson and Prince, as well as Princess Diana and Prince Charles. He has performed with the Hong Kong Philharmonic Orchestra, the Honolulu Symphony, and the Tokyo Symphony. Endo has recorded music for 3 films: Kayo Hatta’s “Picture Bride,” Francis Ford Coppola’s “Apocalypse Now,” and James Cameron’s “Avatar.” He was also featured in the PBS special, “The Spirit of Taiko” (2006). Branching more and more into other genres of music, in 2026, Endo collaborated with the Hawaii Chamber Music Festival, as well as the Hawaii Symphonic Band conducted by Ernest Taniguchi.

Endo has received commissions to compose and tour new music from the American Composers Forum, the McKnight Foundation, The Children's Theatre Company, the Rockefeller Foundation (MAPP), the Japan Foundation, Continental Harmony, the Freeman Foundation, Hawai`i State Foundation on Culture and the Arts, the Japanese American Cultural and Community Center, Stanford Lively Arts, and the Honolulu Mayor’s Office of Culture and the Arts. In 2022, Endo received the prestigious U.S. Artists Fellowship and was named a Living Treasure of Hawaii by the Hompa Hongwanji Mission of Hawaii. In 2024, Endo received the prestigious "Bridge Award" from the Japan America Society of Hawaii for a life-time of work bridging bridges of friendships and understanding between the U.S., Japan, and Hawaii.

== Discography ==
Endo has recorded many CDs of original taiko compositions:

- Eternal Energy (1994): Featuring the Kenny Endo Taiko Ensemble of Tokyo
- Hibiki (1998): Featuring the Kenny Endo Taiko Ensemble of Tokyo
- Jugoya (2000): Featuring the Kenny Endo Taiko Ensembles of Tokyo and Honolulu
- Essence (2001): Featuring Kenny Endo, Masayuki Koga, Michiyo Koga
- On The Way [Michi Yuki] (2007): Featuring Joji Hirota, John Kaizan Neptune, and Kenny Endo
- Rhythm Summit: featuring Noel Okimoto, Dean Taba, and Kenny Endo
- Honua (earth): featuring Derek Nakamoto and Kenny Endo
- Island Breeze: featuring Jeff Peterson, Riley Lee, and Kenny Endo
- Uncommon Time: featuring Abhijit Banerjee, John Santos, and Kenny Endo (release pending)
- Honua II: featuring Derek Nakamoto (keyboards) and Kenny Endo (release pending)
