= Buddhist Churches of America =

U.S. branch of the Nishi Honganji Buddhist subsect

- 米国仏教団
- Classification: Jōdo Shinshū
- Theology: Buddhism
- Language: English; Japanese
- Territory: Contiguous United States
- Founder: Shinran Shonin
- Origin: 1175 AD; Kyoto, Japan
- Branched from: Tendai
- Number of followers: 12,000

The Buddhist Churches of America (abbreviated as BCA in English, 米国仏教団 or Beikoku Bukkyōdan in Japanese) is the United States branch of the Nishi Honganji subsect of Jōdo Shinshū ("True Pure Land School") Buddhism.

The BCA headquarters is at 1710 Octavia Street, San Francisco, and currently under the leadership of Terri Omori, its first female president. It is the oldest Buddhist organization in the continental United States.

== Origins and development ==
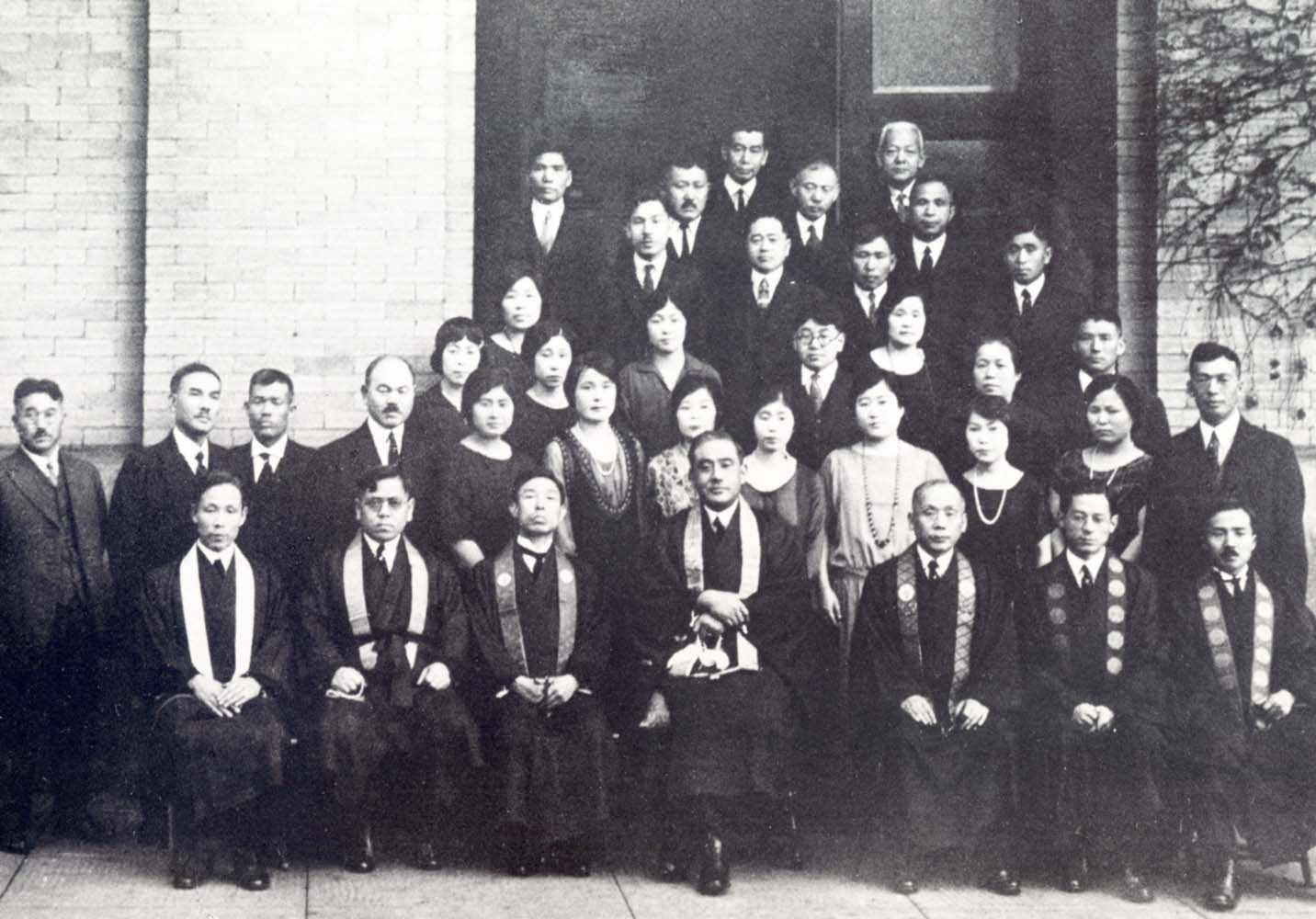
Japanese American congregation at Oregon Buddhist Church, 1925

An earlier branch of the Nishi Hongwanji was established on the Hawaiian Islands in the 1880s as the Honpa Hongwanji Mission of Hawaii. It remains a separate mission from the BCA today.

The BCA's roots on the U.S. mainland originate with missionaries Rev. Dr. Shuya Sonoda and Rev. Kakuryo Nishijima, who arrived in San Francisco in 1899, and formed a Buddhist Association (Bukkyo Seinenkai) as a focal point to begin organizing the Japanese Buddhists in America. They would eventually establish temples in Sacramento (1899), Fresno (1900), Seattle (1901), Oakland (1901), San Jose (1902), Portland (1903), and Stockton (1906), under what was then called the Jodo Shinshu Buddhist Mission of North America. This organization evolved into the current BCA, incorporated in 1944. The BCA counts over 60 affiliated churches and some 12,000 members within its ranks today.

During World War II, Japanese Buddhist communities faced suspicion and discrimination as many Buddhist leaders were targeted by the government, as all mainland Japanese-Americans were incarcerated for the duration of the war. Despite the persecution, Japanese Buddhists kept their faith and continued their practice, initially in secret, in the camps and on the battlefield.

The BCA joined with other Japanese-American community leaders of all faiths in assisting returning Nikkei resettle, opening up surviving churches and temples as temporary hostels, and in cases where churches or temples were vandalized or destroyed, offered up spaces to each other to practice their faith until new facilities could be acquired.

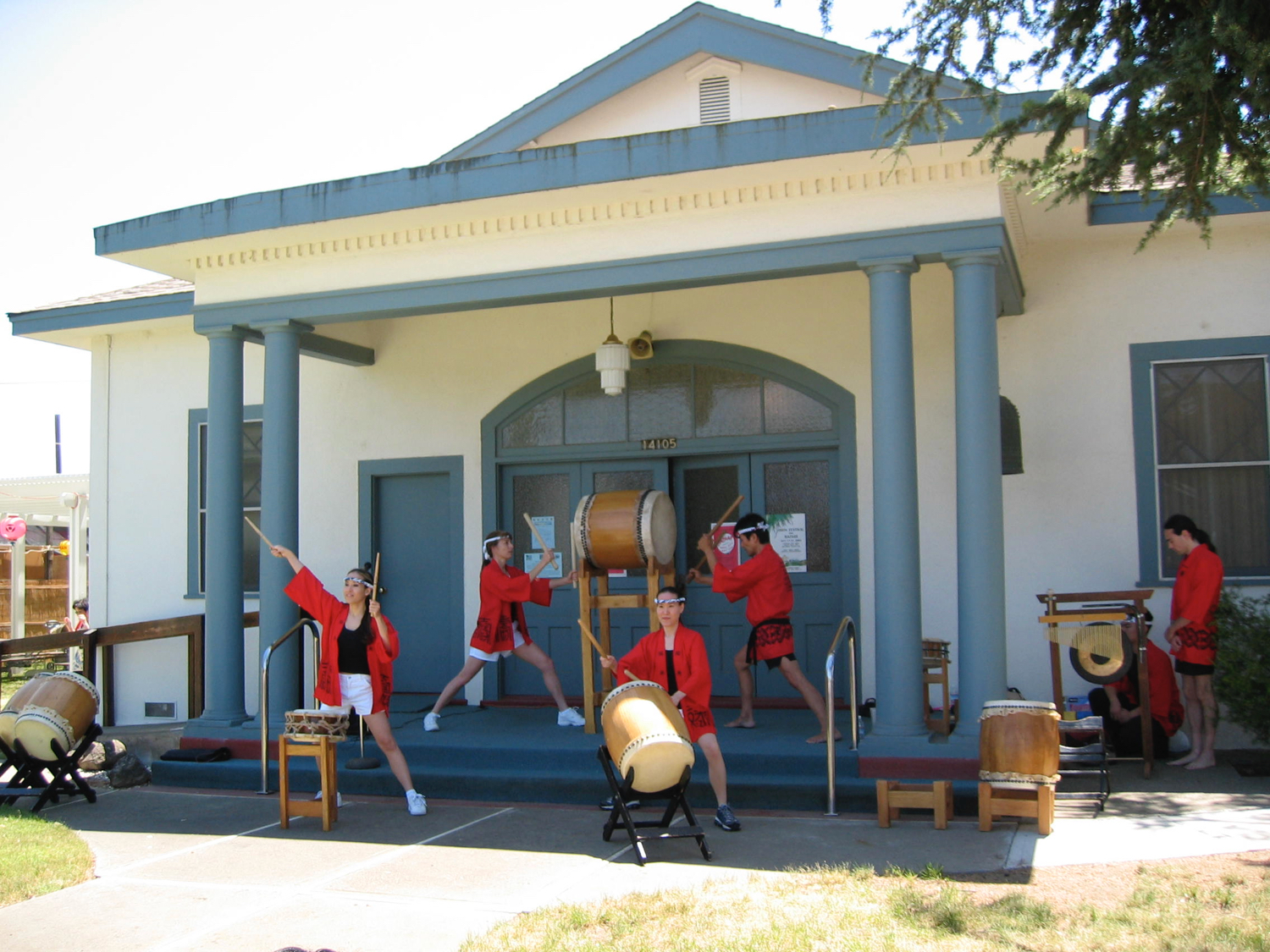
A taiko group performs at Walnut Grove Buddhist Church's bazaar

The BCA hopes that ongoing American interest in the Dharma will lead to a new interest in Jōdo Shinshū and its revival in the United States. The BCA has attempted to accomplish this goal chiefly through academia, layman training, and through cultural events open to the public, such as the bon festival, taiko, and Japanese food bazaars. They also sponsor youth organizations such as Boy and Girl Scout troops, and community basketball leagues, often competing with and providing opportunities for children of all faiths to meet each learn from each other.

BCA was among the first American Buddhist communities to sanction same-sex marriage and support LGBTQ rights.

== Seminary and education ==
In 1949, the BCA founded the Institute of Buddhist Studies in Berkeley as the Buddhist Studies Center, becoming the first seminary for Buddhist ministry in America, and provides graduate level education in the Buddhist tradition through its affiliation with the Graduate Theological Union today.

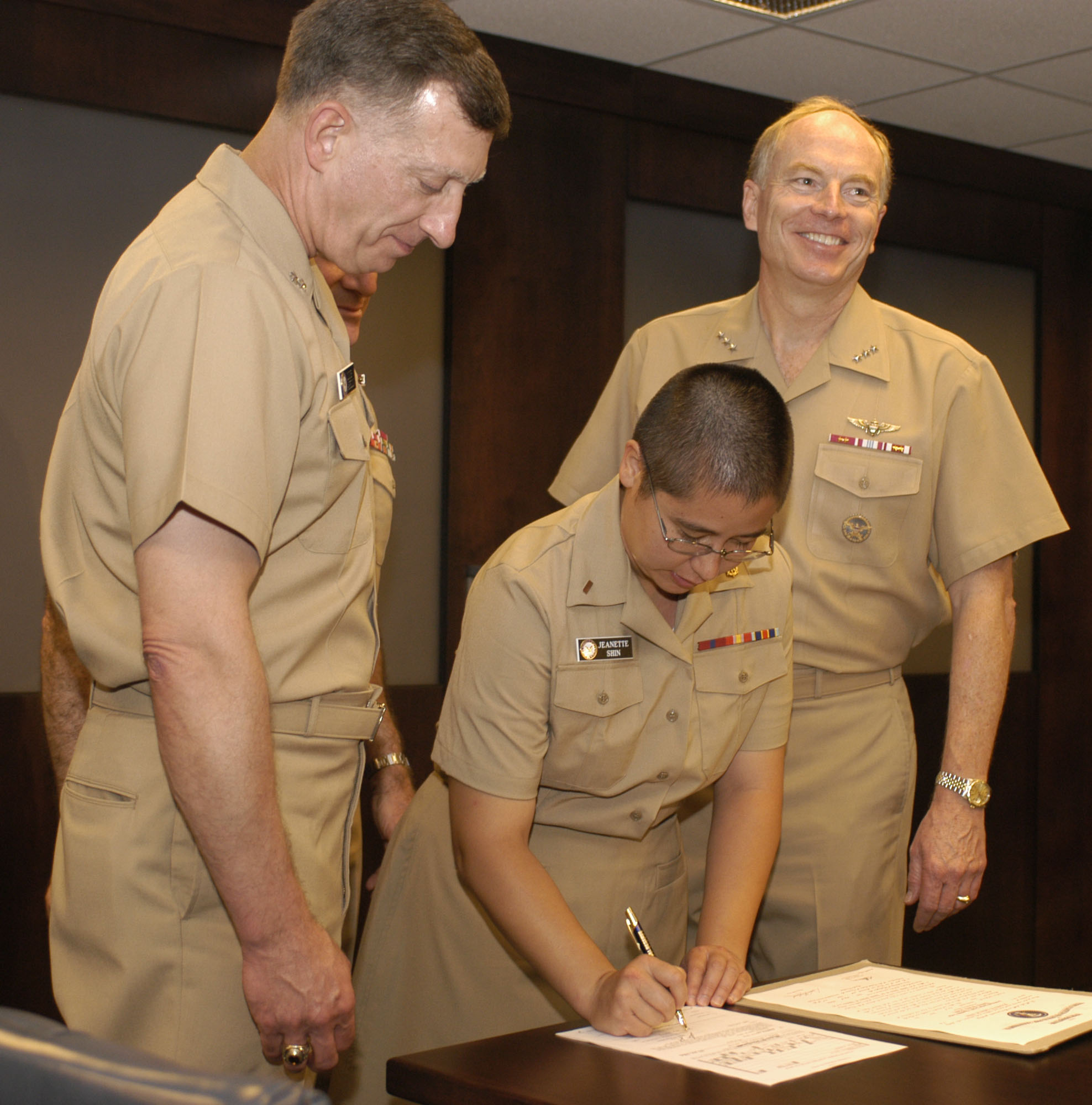
LTJG Shin signs the Oath of Office to become the first Buddhist Chaplain in the U.S. Military

During World War 2 and Korea, the BCA petitioned the War Department to commission Buddhist chaplains to serve the spiritual needs of its members serving with the 442nd RCT, however the request was denied, conflating it with the practice of State Shinto in Japan. It was not until 1987 when the efforts of BCA Rev Haruo Yamaoka, together with Buddhist veterans, finally gained approval from the Department of Defense endorse Buddhist chaplain candidates, and in 2004, when a graduate of IBS, Navy LTJG Jeanette Shin, would be commissioned as the first Buddhist chaplain in the U.S. Military. The BCA is currently the only organization authorized by the Department of Defense to endorse Buddhist chaplains seeking to serve in the military.

BCA ministers have also been the only Buddhists to serve as chaplains in the California State Senate and the California State Assembly, Rev. Shoko Masunaga (1975–1976) and Rev. Bob Oshita (2017–2020), both of Sacramento Betsuin.

== Style ==
In the United States, BCA priests may be addressed as either Sensei ("Teacher"), "Minister", or "Reverend". The head priest of a temple is called "Rinban". Following World War II, BCA traditionally referred to its houses of worship as "churches" rather than "temples" as is common in Japan due to post-war prejudice in America, however have recently begun to slowly embrace the "temple" moniker again.

Prior to the establishment of the Institute of Buddhist Studies as an accredited graduate school in 1985, BCA ministers have historically been all male and ethnically Japanese, trained at Nishi Hongan-ji in Japan, but there are now a substantial number of female, and non-Japanese ministers. In 2022, the BCA appointed their first female president, Terri Omori.

== Outreach ==
In 2020, the BCA started a "Dial the Dharma" project, spearheaded by BCA Bishop Reverend Marvin Harada. Users who have limited access to smart devices, or are not comfortable with smart device technology, can call a toll-free telephone number to hear a 5-minute, pre-recorded weekly message (available every Wednesday). A podcast version is also available.
