= Takatsu =

Takatsu (Japanese: 高津 or 髙津 Chinese: 高津), alternatively spelled Gao Jin in Chinese, refers to:

People:

- Shingo Takatsu
- Gao Jin

Places:

- Takatsu-ku, Kawasaki
- Takatsu Station (disambiguation)
  - Takatsu Station (Kanagawa)
  - Takatsu Station (Kyoto)
