= NKK =

NKK is an abbreviation and may refer to:

- NKK switches (NKK SWITCHES CO., LTD.)
- JFE Holdings, Inc., a corporation formed in 2002 with the merger of NKK (Nippon Kokan, unrelated to Nihon Kaiheiki) and Kawasaki Steel Corporation.
- Nordisk Kemiteknolog Konferens, an annual conference for engineering students from the four Nordic countries: Denmark, Finland, Norway and Sweden.
- Norrköpings KK, a Swedish swim team.
- Nippon Kinkyori Airways, now Air Nippon
