= Nordic student meeting =

19th-century gatherings between Scandinavian students

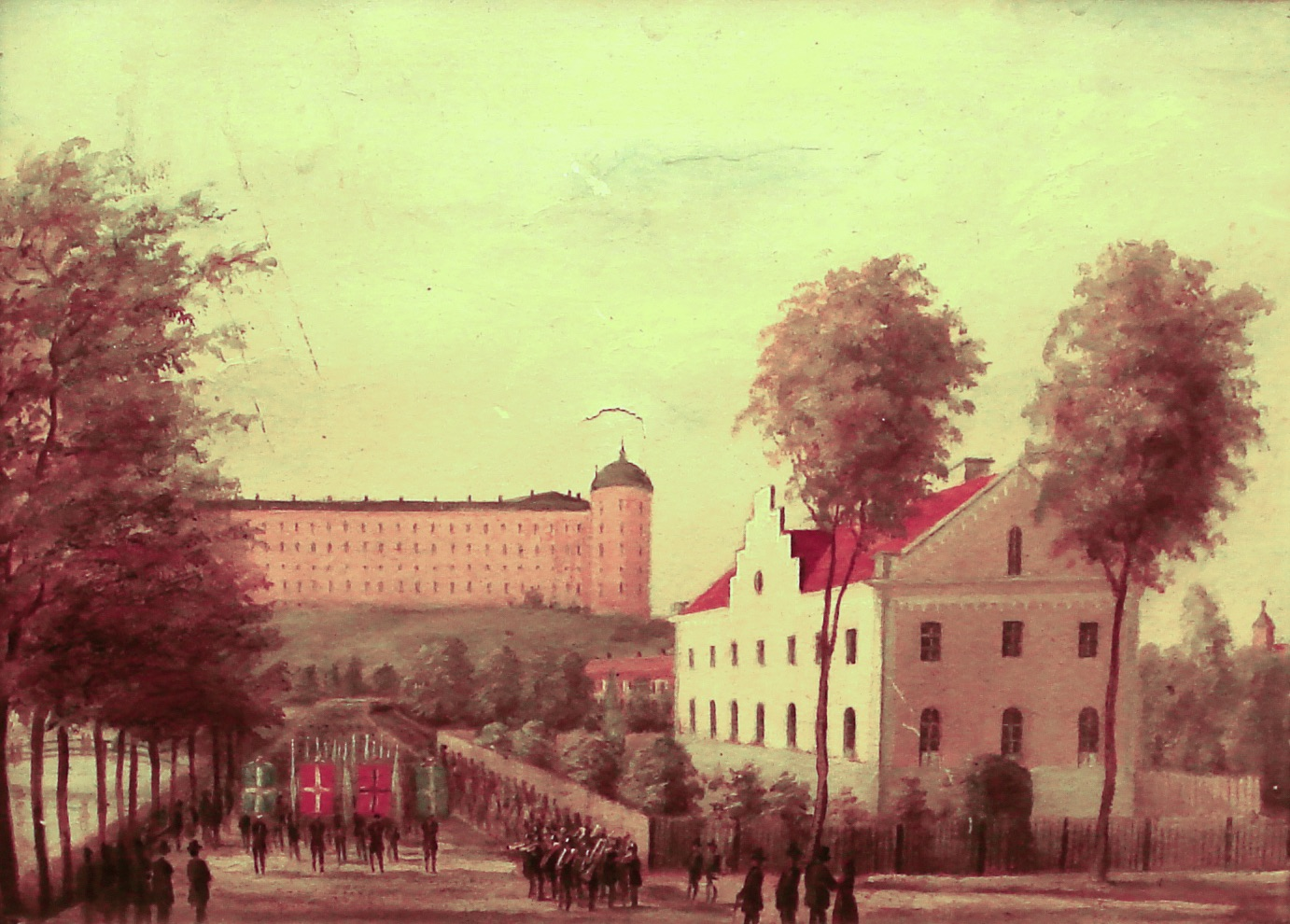
Nordic student meeting in Uppsala 1856.

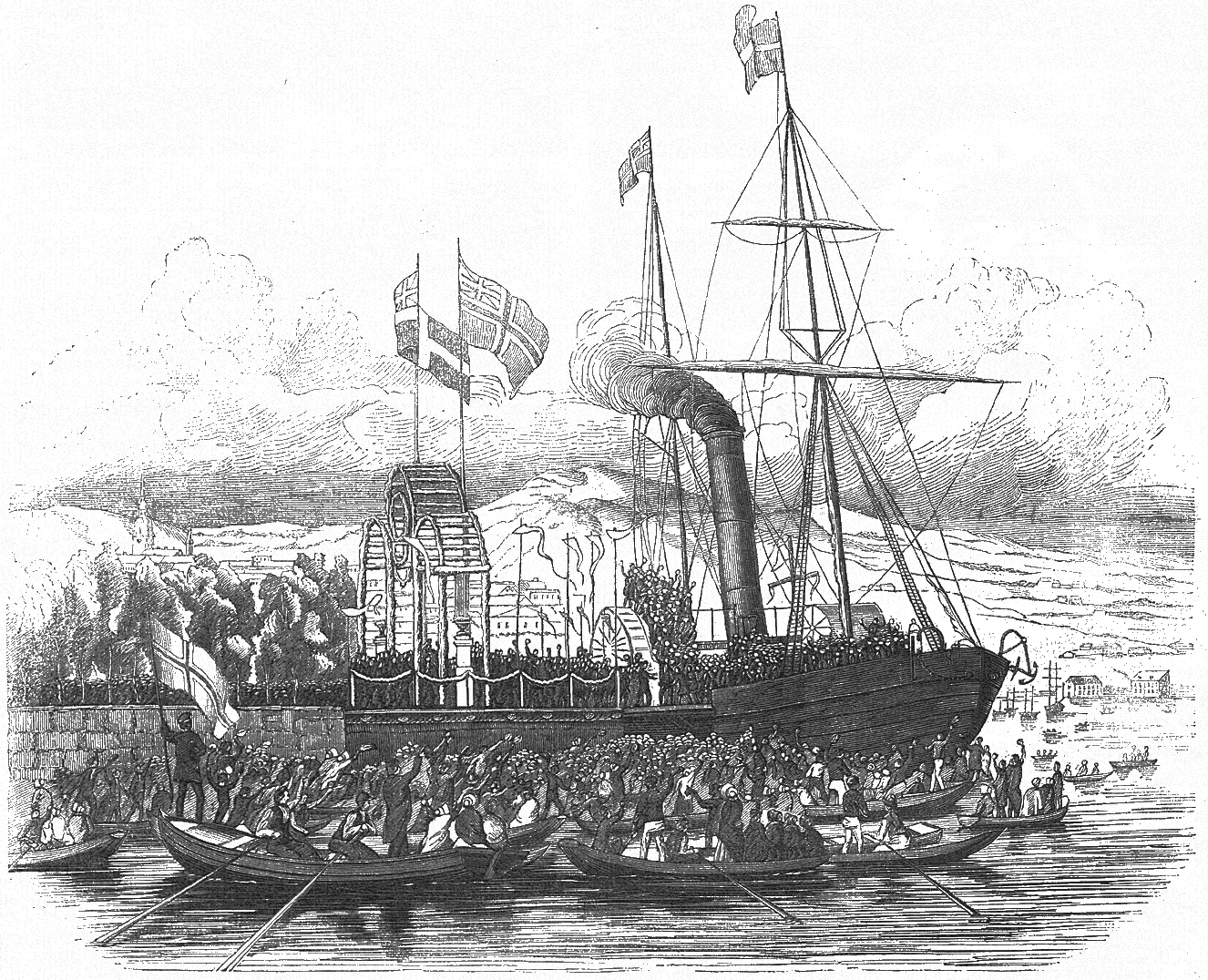
Uppsala students arrive in Oslo, 23 June 1852.

Nordic student meetings (Swedish: Nordiska studentmöten) or Scandinavian student meetings (Swedish: Skandinaviska studentmöten) were a series of gatherings between students at the Scandinavian universities during the 19th century. Students from Uppsala University, Lund University, the University of Copenhagen and the University of Oslo took turns in inviting respectively visiting each other's universities. Students from the University of Helsinki were also invited, but were unable to attend, as the Emperor of Russia had imposed travel bans upon the Helsinki students.

The meetings were a part of the scandinavistic movement which sought to unify the Scandinavian countries politically and culturally. Scandinavianism originated from the University of Copenhagen and spread to Sweden in 1839, when students from Copenhagen marched across Øresund in order to meet the students at Lund. The first Scandinavian student meeting was held in Uppsala year 1843. The Nordic student cap was designed for this occasion, and was adopted as common headgear by all Scandinavian students at the subsequent meeting in Lund and Copenhagen, year 1845. In 1851 the students at the university of Oslo invited to a third student meeting. However, the Uppsala students were unable to attend since the semester hadn't stopped. These were instead invited back the following year. The final student meeting was held in Uppsala in 1875.

== List of Nordic student meetings ==
- 1843 − Uppsala
- 1845 − Copenhagen & Lund
- 1851/1852 − Oslo
- 1856 − Uppsala
- 1862 − Copenhagen & Lund
- 1869 − Oslo
- 1875 − Uppsala

== See also ==
- Nordisk Kemiteknolog Konferens
- Scandinavian Scientist Conference
