= Marvin Harada =

America bishop

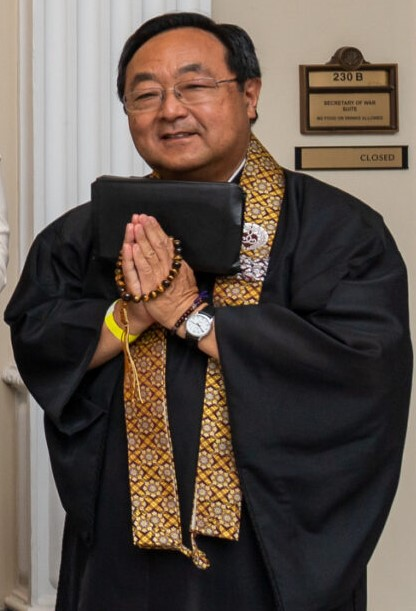
- Born: September 12, 1953; Ontario, Oregon, U.S.
- Education: Ryukoku University, University of Oregon, Institute of Buddhist Studies
- Occupation: Priest

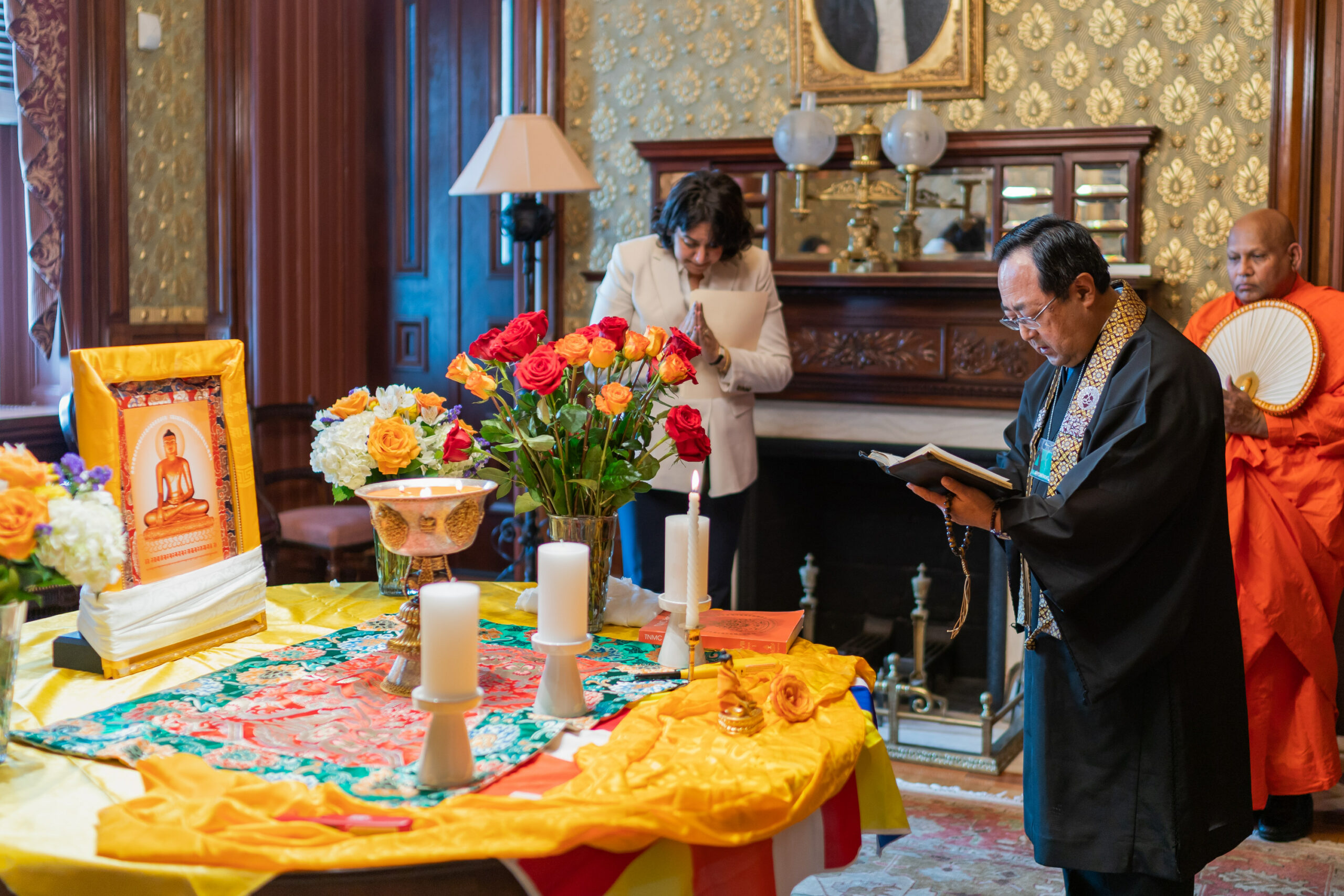
Rev. Marvin Harada reciting a text at the White House Vesak celebration in May 2021

Marvin Harada (born September 12, 1953) is a Jōdo Shinshū Buddhist minister within the Buddhist Churches of America, and serves as its bishop since April 1, 2020. As bishop of BCA, he also serves as the superintendent of Hongwanji-ha's North American district.

On May 25, 2021, he served as the representative of the Mahayana tradition in a celebration of Gautama Buddha's birthday (Vesak) arranged by the White House.

== Biography ==
He was born in Ontario, Oregon. His grandparents, farmers from Hiroshima Prefecture and Yamaguchi Prefecture, emigrated to the United States in early 20th century.

He majored in religious studies at University of Oregon, and received a Master of Arts in Buddhist Studies from Institute of Buddhist Studies. After acquiring these degrees, he moved to Japan to study at Ryukoku University and the Honganji-ha seminary Chuo Bukkyo Gakuin. He received a M.A. in Shin Buddhist Studies from Ryukoku University.

Prior to becoming bishop, he served as a minister at Orange County Buddhist Church since 1986, and eventually became the head minister there. Alongside this, he has served as co-director of BCA Continuing Buddhist Education, and as supervising minister of Sacramento Betsuin and Vista Buddhist Temple.

== Bibliography ==
- Harada, Marvin (2011). Discovering Buddhism in everyday life. Buddhist Education Center. ISBN 9780972139540. OCLC 809726884.
