= Takamaro Shigaraki =

Takamaro Shigaraki (信楽 峻麿, 1926 – 26 September 2014) was a Japanese Buddhist philosopher and priest within the Honganji-ha branch of Jōdo Shinshū. Shigaraki is widely regarded as one of the most influential Buddhologists of the Jōdo Shinshū in the 20th century.

Shigaraki was born in Hiroshima in 1926. The former president of Ryukoku University spent his career studying Pure Land Buddhism. He was on the faculty of Ryukoku University, Kyoto, Japan, since 1958, where he received his PhD in literary studies. He also served as Charmain of the Bukkyo Dendo Kyokai. He tried to clarify a contemporary meaning of Buddhism through looking into Shinran’s thought from a perspective of existentialism. Shigaraki has been influenced by Paul Tillich.

He died of chronic respiratory failure, on 26 September 2014.

== Select bibliography ==
- A Life of Awakening. The Heart of the Shin Buddhist Path. Translation by David Matsumoto. Hozokan Publishing, Kyoto, 2005
- Sogar der Gute wird erlöst, um wie viel mehr der Böse. Der Weg des buddhistischen Meisters Shinran. Übersetzt und mit einem Vorwort versehen von Volker Zotz. Kairos Edition, Luxembourg 2004, ISBN 2-9599829-2-4
- 『浄土教における信の研究』 Jōdokyō ni okeru shin no kinkyū (Studie über den Glauben im Reinen Land Buddhismus) 1975
- Gendai shinshū kyōgaku (Gegenwärtige Shin-Lehren))
- 『仏教の生命観』 Bukkyō no seimeikan (Die buddhistische Sicht des Lebens), Kyoto, 1994
- 『親鸞における信の研究』 Shinran ni okeru shin no kinkyū (Studie über den Glauben in Shinrans Denken), Kyoto, 1995
- 『親鸞とその思想』 Shinran shisō o ikiru (Leben aus Shinrans Denken), Kyoto, 2003
- 『親鸞に学ぶ人生の生き方』 Kyoto, 2008
