= Bishop of the Buddhist Churches of America =

- Sochō
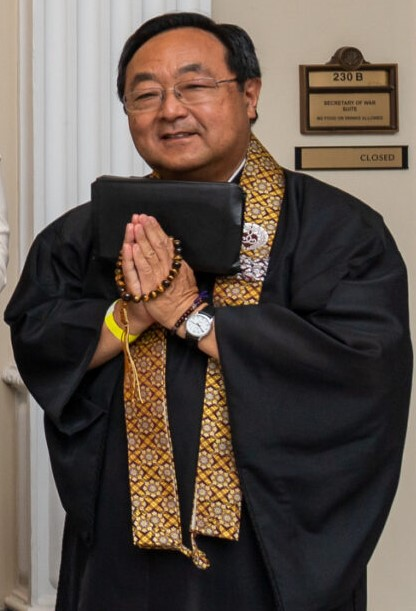
- Incumbent; Marvin Harada since 1 April 2020
- Style: Reverend
- Member of: Buddhist Churches of America
- Seat: San Francisco
- Formation: 1918
- First holder: Kōyū Uchida
- Website: https://www.buddhistchurchesofamerica.org/

The bishop of the Buddhist Churches of America is the highest spiritual leader in the Buddhist Churches of America (BCA). Since BCA is part of Honganji-ha, the bishop is subordinate to the Monshu of Honganji-ha.

Between 1899 and 1918 the leader of Buddhist Mission of North America (BMNA) had the title kantoku (superintendent). 1918 the title was changed to sochō (bishop). BMNA changed its name to Buddhist Churches of America in 1944.

== Nomenclature ==
The leader of Buddhist Mission of North America, later Buddhist Churches of America, held the title kantoku between 1899 and 1918. Kantoku has been translated to "superintendent" and "director". In 1918, the title was changed to sochō, which has been translated as "chancellor" and "president". The official and most common translation, however, is "bishop". The translation of sochō to "bishop" is not literal, but rather an approximate equivalent, much like many other Buddhist terms that are "translated" into English. The title "bishop" is also used as the title for the leaders of Honpa Hongwanji Mission of Hawaii and Jodo Shinshu Buddhist Temples of Canada.

Controversy regarding the usage of the term "bishop" was raised in a conference in 1933, when several members in BMNA argued that it was unsuitable to use English terms that could be associated to Christianity. Although no change was made as a result of this, a discussion regarding "proper" English Buddhist nomenclature has continued to be present within the BCA. Later, BCA came to conduct an inquiry and analysis of the usage of the term "bishop" as an equivalent to the Japanese sochō. The inquiry was conducted through the BCA Ministerial Research Committee. February 24, 1971, the minister Masami Fujitani wrote about the results of the inquiry. Fujitani wrote that the term "bishop" is a neutral English term for spiritual leaders. The reason for deeming it "neutral" was that the original Greek word, "episcopus" (literally "overseer") was used in Greek literature several centuries before the advent of Christianity. The committee had also considered using the term sangharaja, adopted from Theravada Buddhism, but this idea was abandoned because the term was deemed too alien to the BCAs members. Arthur J. Nishimura, doctor in religious studies, has argued that the term "bishop" was chosen to reflect the hierarchical position of the bishop in the BCA. According to Numrich, the bishop of the BCA does not have the same religious role as bishops in Christianity, but his position in the organizational hierarchy is comparable.

== History ==
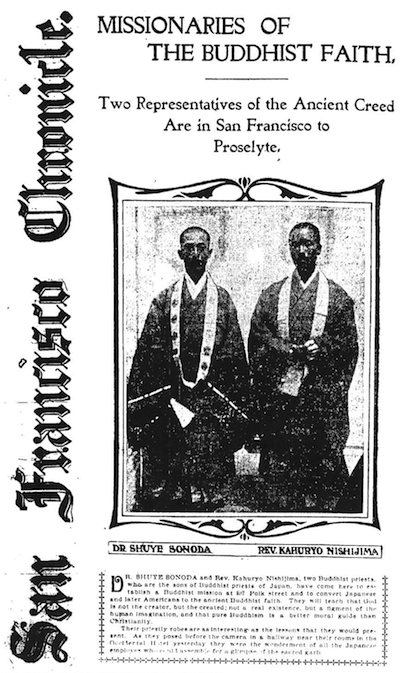
Rev. Shūye Sonoda (left) and Rev. Kakuryo Nishijima (right) in 1899, the first Jodo Shinshu missionaries in the US. Sonoda later became the first kantoku of the Buddhist Mission of North America

The first documented Jodo Shinshu Buddhists to arrive in continental USA, arrived in San Francisco in 1872. 1898 the first group of Jodo Shinshu Buddhists was formed, and in 1899 missionaries were sent from Honganji-ha. In September 1899, a kantoku (superintendent) was assigned to govern the missionaries. In 1918, the title was changed to sochō (bishop).

List of superintendents and bishops of the BCA
#	Name	Title	Period	Source
1	Shūye Sonoda (薗田宗恵)	Kantoku (superintendent/director)	September 1899 – December 1900	
2	Tetsuei Mizuki	Kantoku	December 1900 – October 1901	
3	Kentoku Hori	Kantoku	March 1902 – August 1905	
4	Kōyū Uchida	Kantoku (to 1918), sochō (bishop, from 1918)	August 1905 – September 1923	
-	Senju Sasaki	Acting/interim bishop	September 1923 – July 1925	
-	Ryoun Hanada	Acting/interim bishop	July 1925 – January 1926	
-	Ryusei Kusuhara	Acting/interim bishop	January 1926 – October 1926	
5	Hōshō Sasaki	Bishop (Sochō)	October 1926 – July 1928	
-	Itsuzō Kyōgoku	Acting/interim bishop		
6	Kenju Masuyama	Bishop (Sochō)	July 1930 – February 1938	
7	Ryōtai Matsukage	Bishop (Sochō)	February 1938 – June 1948	
8	Enryo Shigefuji	Bishop (Sochō)	August 1948 – August 1958	
-	Shozen Naito	Acting/interim bishop	August 1958 – March 1959	
9	Shinsho Hanayama	Bishop (Sochō)	May 1959 – May 1968	
10	Kenryu Takashi Tsuji	Bishop (Sochō)	May 1968 – April 1981	
11	Seigen Yamaoka	Bishop (Sochō)	May 1981 – March 1996	
12	Hakubun Watanabe	Bishop (Sochō)	April 1996 –	
13	Koshin Ogui	Bishop (Sochō)	2004 – March 2012	
14	Kodo Umezu	Bishop (Sochō)	March 2012 – March 2020	
15	Marvin Harada	Bishop (Sochō)	April 2020 –	

=== Hierarchical positioning ===
Initially kantoku was the leader for Renraku Bukkyo Dan (Renraku Buddhist Association), which was the governing group in BMNA, consisting of all missionaries (kaikyoshi-priests) in BMNA. The kantoku was directly subordinate to the Overseas Mission Department at Nishi Hongan-ji, which in turn was subordinate to the Monshu. After the re-organization of BMNA in 1944, which included the renaming of the organization from BMNA to BCA, the relationship between Nishi Hongan-ji and the BCA was weakened. Before 1944, the kantoku, later sochō/bishop, the kantoku and bishops were assigned by Nishi Hongan-ji. In 1944, the bishop became an elected office. The bishop is chosen by the kaikyoshi-ministers, although the elected still has to get formally accepted as a bishop by the monshu.

Since 1944 the BCAs central organization is divided into two parts, modeled after the organizational structure of Nishi Hongan-ji. The first part of the organization is devoted to religious matters, while the other is devoted to economical, judicial or other "secular" matters. The bishop is the formal head of both of these.

== Authority and responsibilities ==
The bishop has no direct authority over the local temples and churches. His formal authority mainly lies in the fact that he is the head of the community of priests in the BCA. The bishop does not, however, have the right to ordain new priests. The monshu is the only person who holds this right. All churches and temples are at least in part autonomous from the BCA, since all churches and temples have local boards of directors. Kantoku and later bishops does however have the responsibility to at least once per year visit each temple and church to discover and address potential problems.

In a report from the United States Census Bureau from 1941, that aimed to give a statistical, organizational and doctrinal overview of the religiosity in the United States, the bishops role is described as follows: "the bishop superintendent is in charge of all activities of a religious nature. He has authority to transfer or to remove members of the clergy for good and sufficient causes".

The bishop is the only person in the BCA that has the formal right to move and assign kaikyoshi-ministers to churches and temples. The ministers in question and the affected churches or temples has to agree to these decisions, however. The procedure of assigning a new minister to a temple may go as follows: the potential minister and his family visits the temple in question, and afterwards the members of the temple give their impressions/opinions on this minister to the bishop. The bishop then takes the formal decision of whether to assign this minister to the temple or not.

The bishop also has the authority to conduct the kieshiki-ceremony, in English dubbed "Sarana Affirmation Ceremony". This ceremony/ritual is usually performed by the monshu, in which case the ceremony is called kikyoshiki. The first time a bishop conducted the kieshiki-ceremony was in April 1962, and BCA bishops have continued to do so since then. This ceremony/ritual entails lay persons taking refuge in The Three Jewels, the person(s) being given Dharma-names/Buddhist names (homyo), and a vow from the practitioner to follow the path of Jodo Shinshu Buddhism. As such, this can be described as a Jodo Shinshu-form of a Buddhist initiation ritual.
