= Shibokuchi Shell Mound =

Archaeological site in Kawasaki, Japan

- 子母口貝塚 (Japanese)
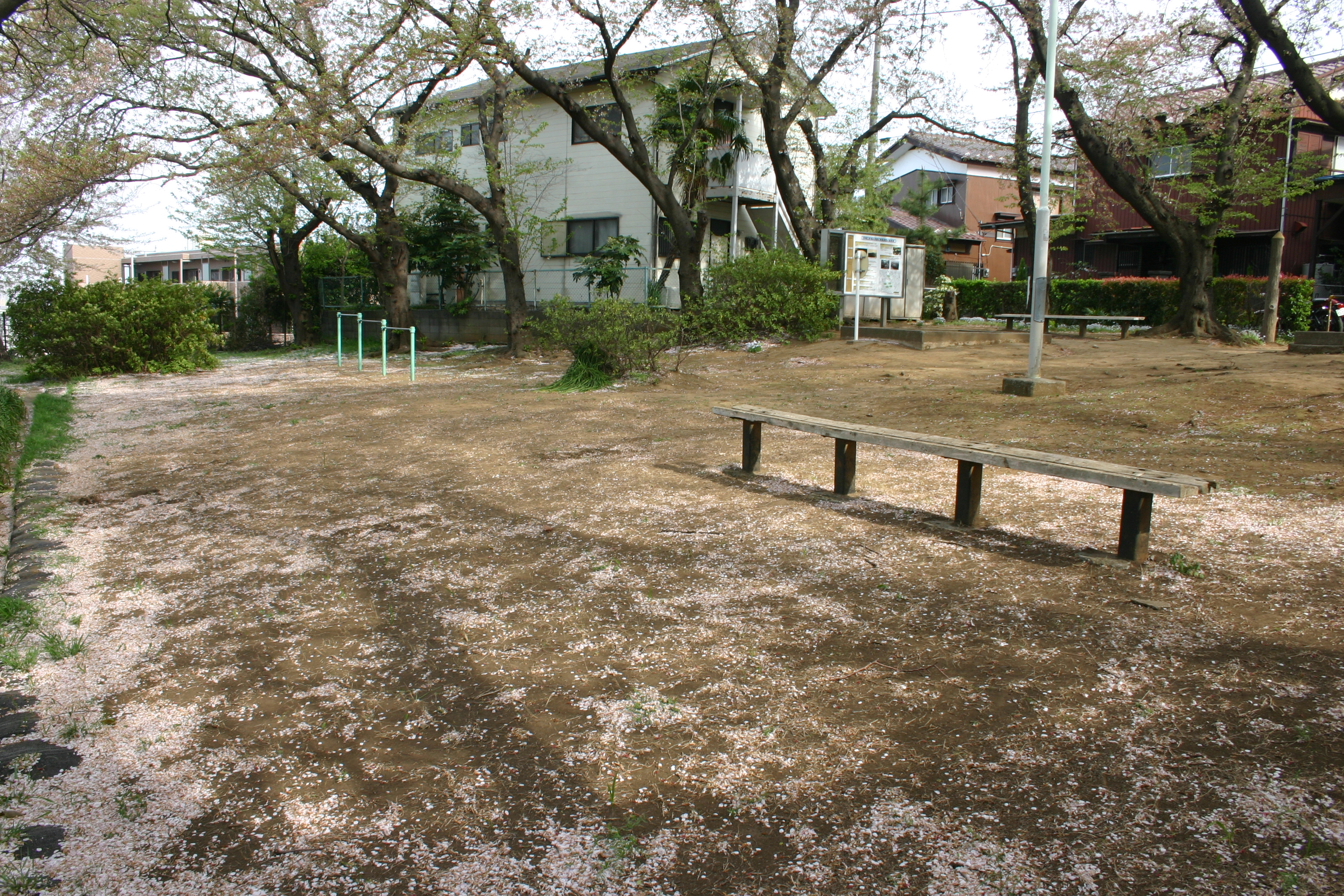

- Shibokuchi Shell Mound Shibokuchi Shell Mound (Japan)
- Interactive map of Shibokuchi Shell Mound
- 35°34′21.6″N 139°37′42.9″E
- Type: shell midden
- Periods: Jōmon period
- Location: Takatsu-ku, Kawasaki, Kanagawa, Japan
- Region: Kantō region

Site notes
- Public access: Yes (park)
- Kanagawa Prefecture Historic Site

The Shibokuchi Shell Mound (子母口貝塚, Shibokuchi kaizuka) is an archaeological site in Takatsu-ku, Kawasaki, Kanagawa Prefecture, in the Kantō region of Japan containing a Jōmon period shell midden. The midden was designated a Kanagawa Prefectural Historic Site of Japan in 1957.The Shimoguchi Shell Mound was originally a collective name for four shell mounds covering an area of approximately 100 meters east-west and 150 meters north-south, two of which still exist today.

== Overview ==
During the early to middle Jōmon period (approximately 4000 to 2500 BC), sea levels were five to six meters higher than at present, and the ambient temperature was also 2 deg C higher. During this period, the northern Kantō region was inhabited by the Jōmon people, many of whom lived in coastal settlements. The middens associated with such settlements contain bone, botanical material, mollusc shells, sherds, lithics, and other artifacts and ecofacts associated with the now-vanished inhabitants, and these features, provide a useful source into the diets and habits of Jōmon society. Most of these middens are found along the Pacific coast of Japan.

The Shibokuchi Shell Mound is from the late Early Jōmon period, and is one of many shell mounds that were once scattered along the eastern edge of the Shimotsueyoshi Plateau at the northeastern edge of the Tama Hills. This location, which was the coastline during the Jōmon transgression, overlooks the Tama River and is at an elevation of approximately 25 meters above the present sea level. This shell midden dates back to the late Early Jomon period, about 8100 years ago, and is one of the oldest shell mounds on the Tama Hills. The shells that make up the 15-25 cm thick shell layer are mainly shallow-sea-dwelling species such as Pacific oysters, Yamato shijimi and blood cockles. In addition, bones of fish such as sea bass, sea bream, and Salmon sharks have also been discovered. Since these inhabit shallow sandy mud, it indicates that the area around the shell mound was a bay-like area at a river mouth at the time. This midden is also the type site for "Shimoguchi-style pottery", a type of Jōmon pottery which is characterized by presence of fibers in the clay body, raised bands on the rim, and interlocking impression patterns created by pressing a cord or shells without rotation. No settlement remains such as pit dwellings have been excavated. However, given the large quantity of shellfish at the site, it can be inferred that there must have been a settlement in the vicinity.

The midden is first mentioned in academia in 1893, with initial archaeological excavations conducted in 1927, 1929 and 1930; however, due to the loss of documents during World War II and the deaths of those involved, these investigations never resulted in a compiled record. After the war, following looting and the treat of urban encroachment on the site, Kawasaki city acquired "Site C" of the four mounds in 1955 for preservation.

The Shimoguchi Shell Mound is located approximately 1.6 km southwest of Musashi-Nakahara Station on the Nambu Line. Currently, the site is backfilled and preserved as Shimoguchi Park.

== See also ==
- List of Historic Sites of Japan (Kanagawa)
