= Yehan Numata =

Japanese entrepreneur

- Born: April 12, 1897; Japan Hiroshima Prefecture
- Died: May 4, 1994 (aged 97)
- Occupations: Japanese industrialist and Buddhist missionary

Yehan Numata (沼田 恵範, Numata Ehan; 12 April 1897 – 4 May 1994) was a Japanese industrialist and Buddhist missionary.

== Early life ==
Born in Hiroshima Prefecture, Numata was the third son of a priest of the Jodo Shinshu sect of Buddhism. He studied at Kyoto Heian Junior High School (today Heian High School) and was ordained a priest and sent to the United States as a missionary. He studied mathematics at Hollywood High School and obtained a degree in economics from the University of California, Berkeley.

During his time in the United States, he established Pacific World, a publication dedicated to propagating Buddhist teachings and furthering understanding between the United States and Japan. Despite financial assistance from Nishi Honganji and Shibusawa Eiichi, the publication ran out of funds and closed after four years.

== Business career ==
Numata returned to Japan at the age of 33 and was employed as a statistician by the Japanese government. In 1936 he left his government job to establish Mitutoyo, which was the first Japanese company to manufacture precision micrometers. The company was successful, primarily due to army contracts and later as a result of the Japanese economic miracle, and eventually diversified into a variety of precision measuring instruments.

== Missionary career ==
In 1965, Numata founded the Society for the Promotion of Buddhism (Ja: Bukkyo Dendo Kyokai, generally known in English by its initials BDK), with a mission of distributing Buddhist teachings around the world. Its book The Teaching of Buddha has been distributed in Japanese hotel rooms just as the Gideon Bible is often found in American hotel rooms. In 1986 Numata initiated a project to translate the entire Taishō Tripiṭaka into English, an endeavor which is expected to require as long as a century to complete. Numata remained active in the propagation of Shin Buddhism throughout the Western world, establishing temples in Virginia (such as Ekoji Buddhist Temple) and Germany as well as providing various Buddhist scholarships.

== Personal life ==
Numata's son, Toshihide Numata (1933–2017), served as President of Mitutoyo and Chairman of BDK. Under his leadership, he expanded the number of Numata Chair programs in Buddhist Studies at universities worldwide and oversaw the development of various educational and charitable initiatives. His grandson, Yoshiaki Numata, is currently the President of Mitutoyo and Chairman of BDK.
