= Kenryu Takashi Tsuji =

Japanese American Buddhist leader

- Title: Reverend, Bishop

Personal life
- Born: March 14, 1919 Mission City, British Columbia
- Died: February 26, 2004 (aged 84)
- Spouse: Sakaye Tsuji
- Education: University of British Columbia, Ryukoku University

Religious life
- Religion: Jōdo Shinshū Buddhism

Kenryu Takashi Tsuji (1919-2004) was a Japanese Canadian and Japanese American Buddhist leader.

Tsuji was born in Mission City, British Columbia, graduated from the University of British Columbia, and studied Buddhism at Ryukoku University. He received his ordination in 1941. In 1942, during World War II, Tsuji was sent to a Canadian internment camp in Slocan, British Columbia. In 1958, he moved to California and became a US Citizen around 1965.

Tsuji was a Shin Buddhist Minister and the first Canadian-born Buddhist Minister. In 1946 Reverend Tsuji, and others, held the first Obon service in Canada. In 1947 they founded what became the Toronto Buddhist Church. In the following years he founded a number of temples in Canada, such as the Hamilton Buddhist Church and the Montreal Buddhist Church, and the US, including Ekoji Buddhist Temple. From 1968 to 1981 Kenryu Tsuji served as the first North American born, first nisei Bishop of the Buddhist Churches of America and also served as President of the Institute of Buddhist Studies. He also had a black belt in judo. Reverend Tsuji was the first Buddhist to be president of the United States affiliate of the World Conference on Religion and Peace from 1983 to 1989. In 1993 he was a guest at the White House Interfaith Breakfast with President Bill Clinton.

== Works ==
- Heart of the Buddha-Dharma. Numata Center. 2003. ISBN 9781886439221.
