= Scott Mitchell (Buddhist scholar) =

American scholar of Buddhism

Scott A. Mitchell is an American scholar of Buddhism who has written extensively on Buddhism in the United States. He is the current president of the Institute of Buddhist Studies.

== Early life and education ==
Mitchell grew up in the Los Angeles area and studied philosophy and religion at San Francisco State University under Jacob Needleman and Ronald Epstein. He received his PhD in Interdisciplinary Studies from the Graduate Theological Union in 2008, studying under Buddhist scholar Richard K. Payne.

Between 2002 and 2012, Mitchell maintained the blog The Buddha is My DJ where he wrote about his research, American Buddhism, racism, and engaged in debate with other Buddhist bloggers of the time, including the "Angry Asian Buddhist."

Since 2008 he has been cohost of the DharmaRealm podcast with Rev. Harry Gyokyo Bridge, a Shin Buddhist minister and bassist based in Oakland.

== Career ==
In 2008 Mitchell began teaching for the Institute of Buddhist Studies in Berkeley. In 2015 he was appointed the Rev. Yoshitaka Tami Professor of Jodo Shinshu Buddhist Studies. In 2016 he was appointed dean of students and faculty affairs, succeeding previous Dean Richard Payne. Mitchell was appointed to the position of president in 2024.

Mitchell’s scholarship has focused on American Buddhism and Buddhist media. He has written a textbook on American Buddhism and co-edited with Natalie Quli two volumes on Buddhism in the United States and Buddhist studies methodology. Mitchell has argued for the importance of media analyses in the understanding of Buddhism’s dissemination to the West, and has published numerous essays on the topic. In his work on American Buddhism, he has argued for a de-centering of American exceptionalism and has foregrounded the experiences of Jodo Shinshu and Japanese American Buddhists.

In addition to his original scholarship, Mitchell serves on the editorial committees of the Pacific World Journal, The Pure Land: Journal of the International Association of Shin Buddhist Studies, and the Oxford Encyclopedia of Buddhism. Since 2018 he has been the co-chair of the Buddhism in the West Unit at the American Academy of Religion.

== Select bibliography ==
- The Making of American Buddhism, New York: Oxford University Press, 2023.
- Methods in Buddhist Studies: Essays in Honor of Richard K. Payne, edited with Natalie Fisk Quli, London: Bloomsbury Academic, 2019.
- Buddhism in America: Global Religion, Local Contexts, London: Bloomsbury Academic, 2016.
- Buddhism Beyond Borders: New Perspectives on Buddhism in the United States, edited with Natalie E.F. Quli, Albany: State University of New York Press, 2015.
- The Tranquil Mediator: Representing Buddhism and Buddhists in US Popular Media, Religion Compass, 8/3 (2014): 81–89.
- Christianity is for rubes; Buddhism is for actors’: U.S. media representations of Buddhism in the wake of the Tiger Woods scandal, Journal of Global Buddhism 13 (2012): 61-79.
