= Futako-shinchi Station =

Railway station in Kawasaki, Kanagawa Prefecture, Japan

Futako-shinchi Station 二子新地駅

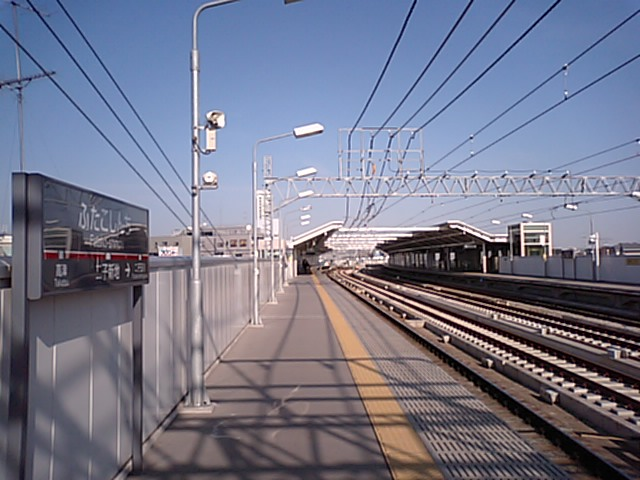
- Platforms of Futako-shinchi Station

General information
- Location: 2-chome, Futago, Takatsu Ward, Kawasaki City; Kanagawa Prefecture 213-0002; Japan
- Coordinates: 35°36′26″N 139°37′21″E
- Operator: Tōkyū Railways
- Lines: Den-en-toshi Line; Ōimachi Line
- Distance: 10.1 km (6.3 mi) from Shibuya
- Platforms: 2 side platforms
- Tracks: 4
- Connections: Bus terminal

Construction
- Structure type: Elevated

Other information
- Station code: DT08
- Website: Official website

History
- Opened: 15 July 1927; 99 years ago
- Former names: Futago; Futago-shinchi-mae (until 1977)

Passengers
- FY2019: 21,734

Services
Preceding station	Tōkyū Railways	Following station
Takatsu towards Chūō-rinkan	Den-en-toshi Line Local	Futako-tamagawa towards Shibuya
Takatsu towards Mizonokuchi	Ōimachi Line Local	Futako-tamagawa towards Ōimachi
Location
- Location within Kanagawa Prefecture Location within Tokyo Bay and Bōsō Peninsula Location within Japan

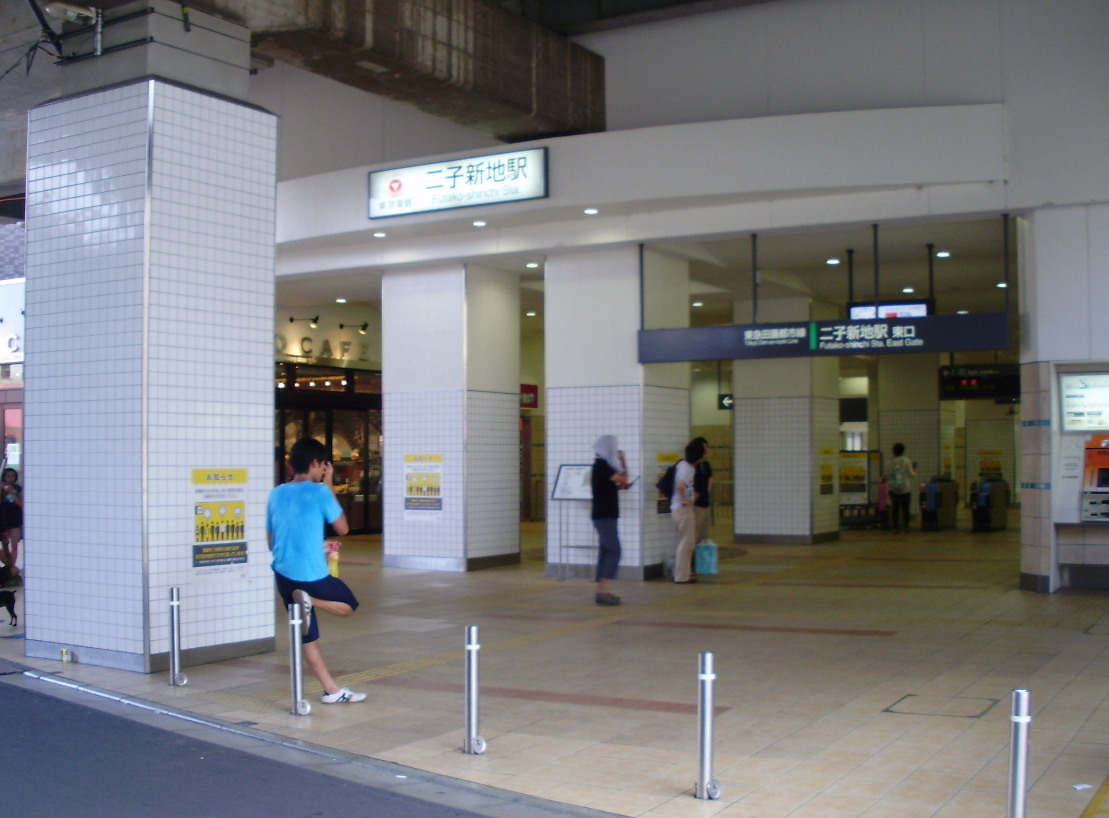
East exit of Futako-shinchi Station

Futako-shinchi Station (二子新地駅, Futako-shinchi-eki) is a junction passenger railway station located in the northern part of Takatsu-ku, Kawasaki, Kanagawa Prefecture, Japan, operated by the private railway operator Tokyu Corporation.

== Lines ==
Futako-shinchi Station is served by the Tōkyū Den-en-toshi Line and Tōkyū Ōimachi Line. It is 10.1 kilometers from the starting point of the Tōkyū Den-en-toshi Line at Shibuya Station.

== Station layout ==
The station consists of two elevated opposed side platforms serving two tracks. The station building is located underneath the tracks and platforms.

=== Platforms ===
1	Tōkyū Den-en-toshi Line	for Saginuma, Nagatsuta, and Chūō-rinkan
1	Tōkyū Ōimachi Line	for Mizonokuchi; Tōkyū Den-en-toshi Line for Saginuma and Nagatsuta
2	■ For Passing	-
3	■ For Passing	-
4	Tōkyū Den-en-toshi Line	for Shibuya; Tokyo Metro Hanzomon Line for Oshiage; Tobu Skytree Line for Tōbu-Dōbutsu-Kōen; Tobu Isesaki Line for Kuki; Tobu Nikko Line for Minami-kurihashi
4	Tōkyū Ōimachi Line	for Futako-tamagawa, Jiyūgaoka, and Ōimachi

== History ==
Futako-shinchi Station was opened on July 15, 1927, as the Futago stop on the Tamagawa Electric Railway (玉川電気鉄道, Tamagawa Denki Tetsudo). It was renamed to Futago-Jizen in 1935. On July 1, 1943, it became part of the Ōimachi Line and was rebuilt to a train station. The station was rebuilt on March 18, 1966, as an elevated station along with the construction of Futako Bridge (二子橋梁). The station was renamed to its present name on December 16, 1977. From 2005 - 2008 the platforms were rebuilt for expansion of Tōkyū Ōimachi Line.

== Passenger statistics ==
In fiscal 2019, the station was used by an average of 21,734 passengers daily.

The passenger figures for previous years are as shown below.

Fiscal year	daily average
2005	16,652
2010	18,870
2015	21,266

== Surrounding area ==
- Tama River
- Futago Bridge
- Futako Shrine
- Kanoko Okamoto Literature Monument "Pride"—produced by Taro Okamoto.

== See also ==
- List of railway stations in Japan
