= Mitutoyo =

Japanese multinational manufacturer of measuring instruments

Mitutoyo Corporation

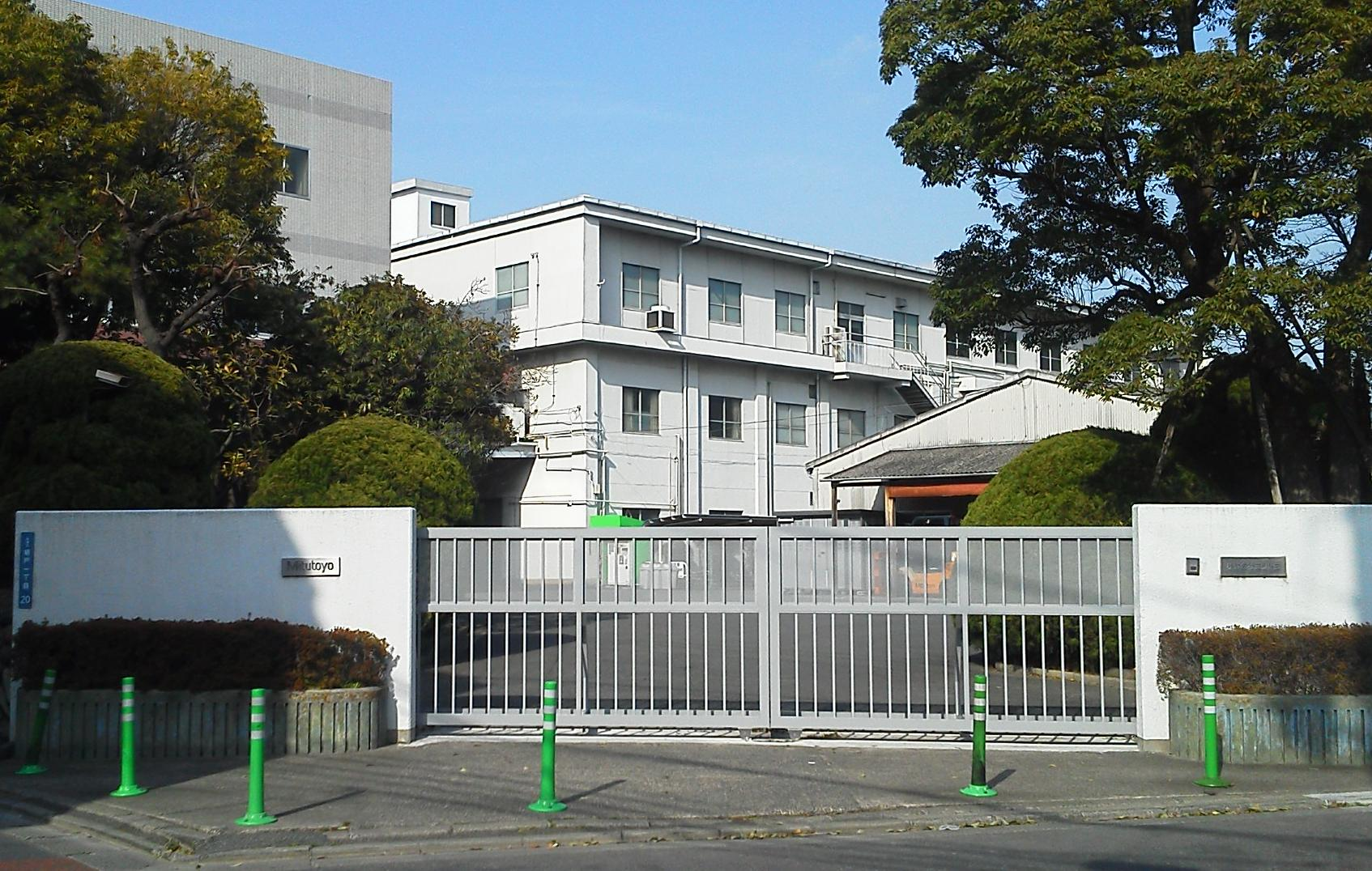
- Corporate headquarters and Mizonokuchi factory
- Native name: 株式会社ミツトヨ
- Company type: Private KK
- Industry: Machinery
- Founded: (October 22, 1934; 90 years ago)
- Founder: Yehan Numata
- Headquarters: Sakado, Takatsu-ku, Kawasaki, Kanagawa 213-8533, Japan
- Area served: Worldwide
- Key people: Yoshiaki Numata (President)
- Products: Precision measuring instruments
- Revenue: ▲JPY 112.8 billion (FY 2014) (US$ 956 million) (FY 2014)
- Number of employees: 5,107 (as of December 31, 2014)
- Website: Official website

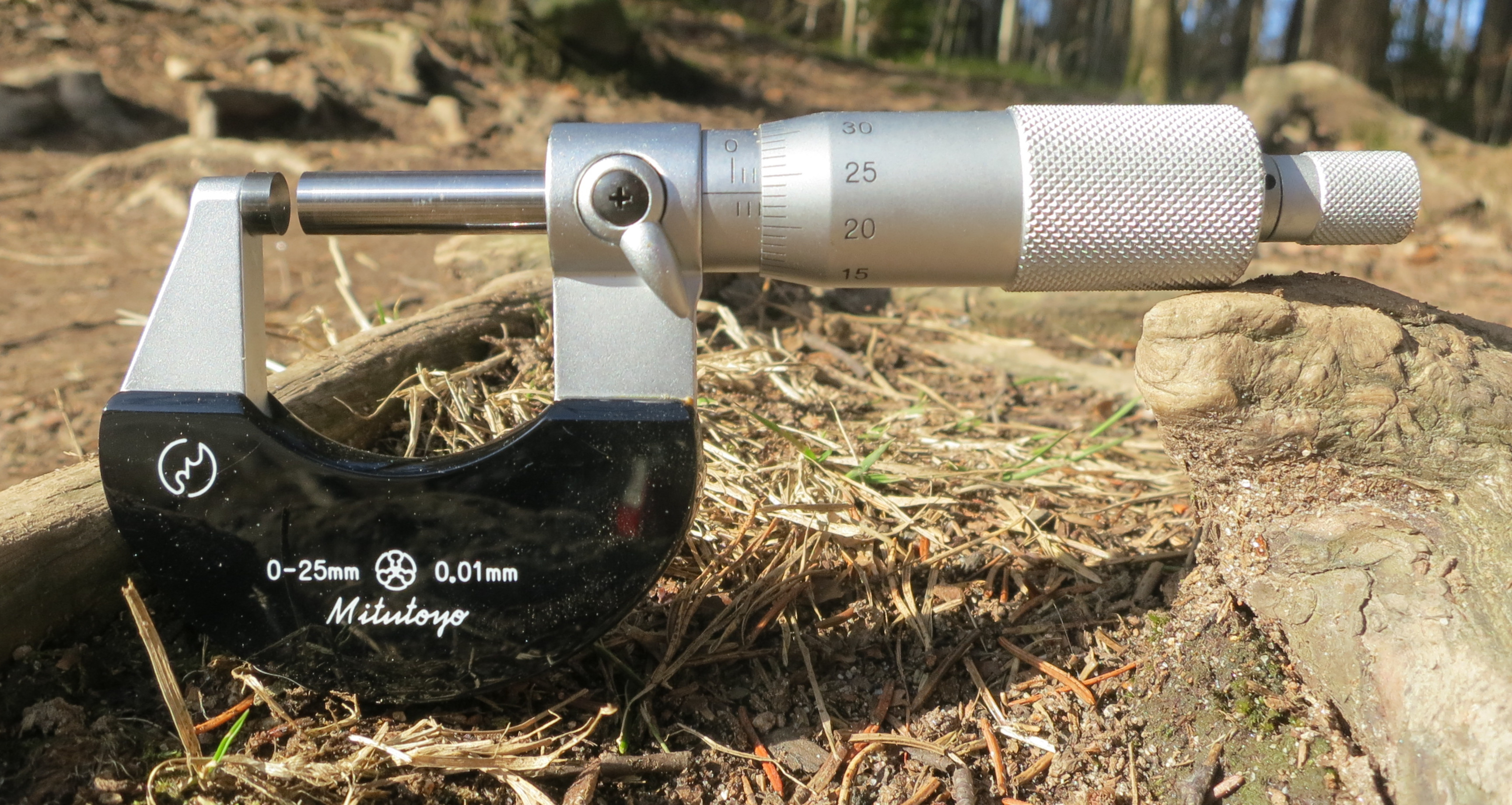
Micrometer by Mitutoyo

Mitutoyo Corporation (株式会社ミツトヨ, Kabushiki Kaisha Mitsutoyo) is a Japanese multinational corporation specializing in measuring instruments and metrological technology, headquartered at Takatsu-ku, Kawasaki, Kanagawa.

It was founded in 1934 by Yehan Numata (沼田 恵範 Numata Ehan).

== History ==
Mitutoyo was founded by Japanese entrepreneur Yehan Numata in 1934. Numata had spent the decade of the 1920s in the United States, where he studied at the University of California, Berkeley. While studying, he left a profound impression on those at Berkeley, which led him to be recognized many years later. He first entered the United States to study in 1921 and spent the next few years studying mathematics and statistics as an undergraduate. He remained at UC Berkeley until 1928, when he received his master's degree. Numata returned to his native Japan where he launched the Mitutoyo Corporation. It is believed that growing up in the Meiji period in Japan and witnessing the United States' industrial markets prior to The Great Depression gave Numata inspiration to form his own corporation.

On October 22, 1934, Mitutoyo was established by Numata. At the time of launch, Mitutoyo only had a single product, the micrometer. The 1930s in Japan was a period of industrialization and Numata was part of a wider movement to begin to produce foreign technology domestically. Prior to this, Japan was heavily focused on textiles, with Mitutoyo forming the foundations for the technically advanced Japan we see today. The Japanese government invested heavily in the 1930s in infrastructure, especially on the railway. This led to the rapid growth of manufacturing across various sectors. This focus on manufacturing, allowed Numata to form a research and development facility in Kamata, Tokyo where he began to experiment with the creation of micrometers. Over a period of three years, Numata developed Mitutoyo's first product, a Japanese-manufactured micrometer. In order to promote the new product, a promotional towel was created, which read "The World's Best Micrometer."

Following the breakout of World War II, manufacturing demand in numerous countries intensified, due to the heavy demand for advanced military equipment. However, this demand meant that often shortcuts were taken and standardization was not common. This meant that micrometers were often produced that were substandard, with only a few manufacturers able to deliver high-quality micrometers. Numata differentiated his products by offering high quantities with standardization. This movement in Mitutoyo and other manufacturing companies during World War II eventually led to the creation of Just-in-time manufacturing.

As electronic technology became more widespread in the 1970s, Mitutoyo applied electronics to its line of dimensional gaging equipment to include electronic, or digital, measuring tools. During this time it also began to offer larger, more complex and more sensitive measuring instruments, including optical comparators, form measuring equipment, and coordinate measuring machines (CMMs). As statistical process control (SPC) was introduced, Mitutoyo led the world in the development of output gages, interfaces, data collectors and analysis software to take advantage of this new metrological science.

When the computer made its way into the field of metrology, Mitutoyo again shifted its focus to include this technology into its product offering and push measuring accuracies into the sub-micrometre range. Today, Mitutoyo presents its 6,000+ products as integrated, computer-based metrology systems, where they can be interconnected to form closed-loop-measuring networks.

== Mitutoyo America Corporation ==
Mitutoyo America Corporation was formed in 1963 and is headquartered in Aurora, Illinois (just outside Chicago). Mitutoyo America offers the full product line of precision measuring tools, instruments and equipment with a distribution network, training and education classes, software development, and service support to provide a comprehensive metrology organization.

The company name is usually spelled in the Kunrei-shiki/Nihon-shiki manner "Mitutoyo". Because most publications for foreigners as of 2000 require the usage of Hepburn romanization, as of 2000 in the Tokyo Anglophone yellow pages the company name is rendered in the Hepburn style "Mitsutoyo".

Following the opening of the Boeing manufacturing base in Sheffield, England, it was announced that Mitutoyo would be an active partner in the supply chain.

== Conviction for illegal activities ==
On 14 September 2006, the Tokyo District Public Prosecutor’s Office indicted four former executives of the Mitutoyo Corporation. The company was penalized for violating the Foreign Exchange and Foreign Trade Law prohibiting the company from exporting any products for 6 months and from exporting measuring devices for an additional 2½ years (2007–mid 2010). In addition, the Japanese court gave the former executives multi-year jail sentences (suspended) and fined Mitutoyo ¥45 million (approx. 350,000 USD). It was found that Mitutoyo created software for their products that would falsify the accuracy of the measurements taken in order to circumvent customs inspections.

There is evidence that a portion of Mitutoyo’s illegal exports helped in nuclear-weapon programs in Libya, Iran, and North Korea. In particular, several Mitutoyo coordinate-measuring machines were allegedly sold to Scomi Precision Engineering in Malaysia. The Scomi scandal was part of a wider arms-smuggling operation masterminded by Pakistani nuclear scientist Abdul Qadeer Khan.
