= Scandinavism =

Ideology supporting cooperation between Scandinavian countries

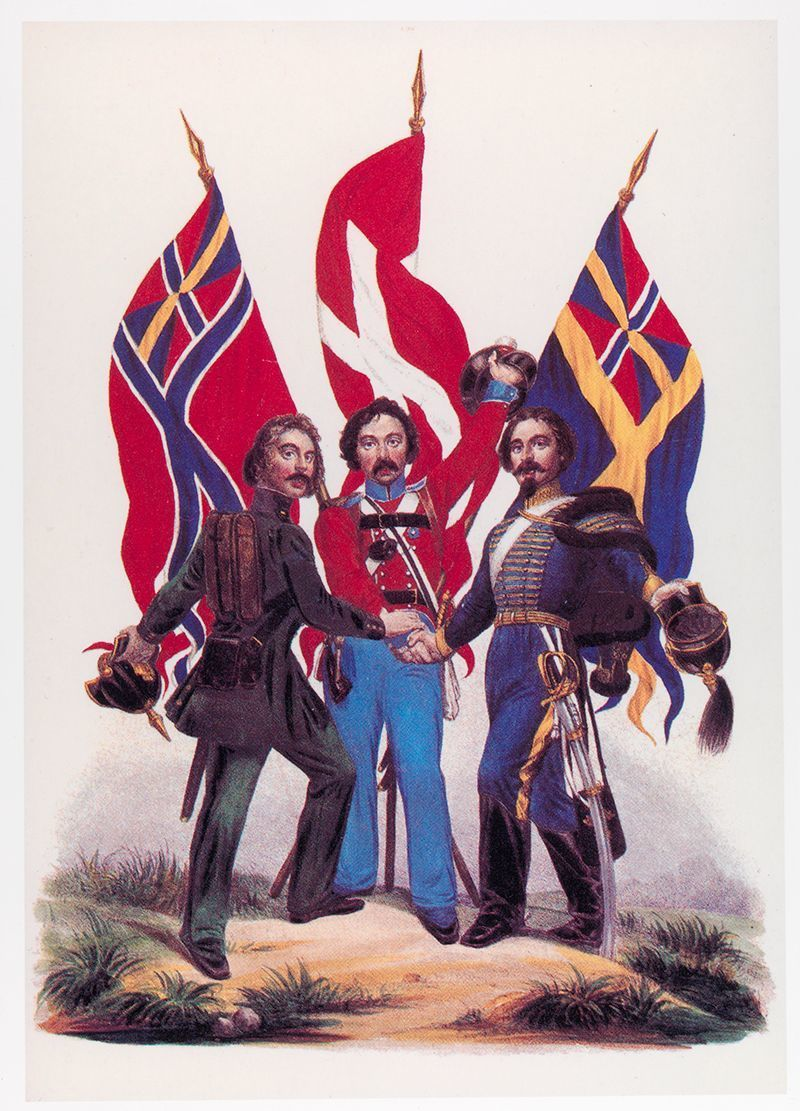
A 19th-century poster image of (from left to right) Norwegian, Danish and Swedish soldiers joining hands. The Norwegian and Swedish flags have the union mark.

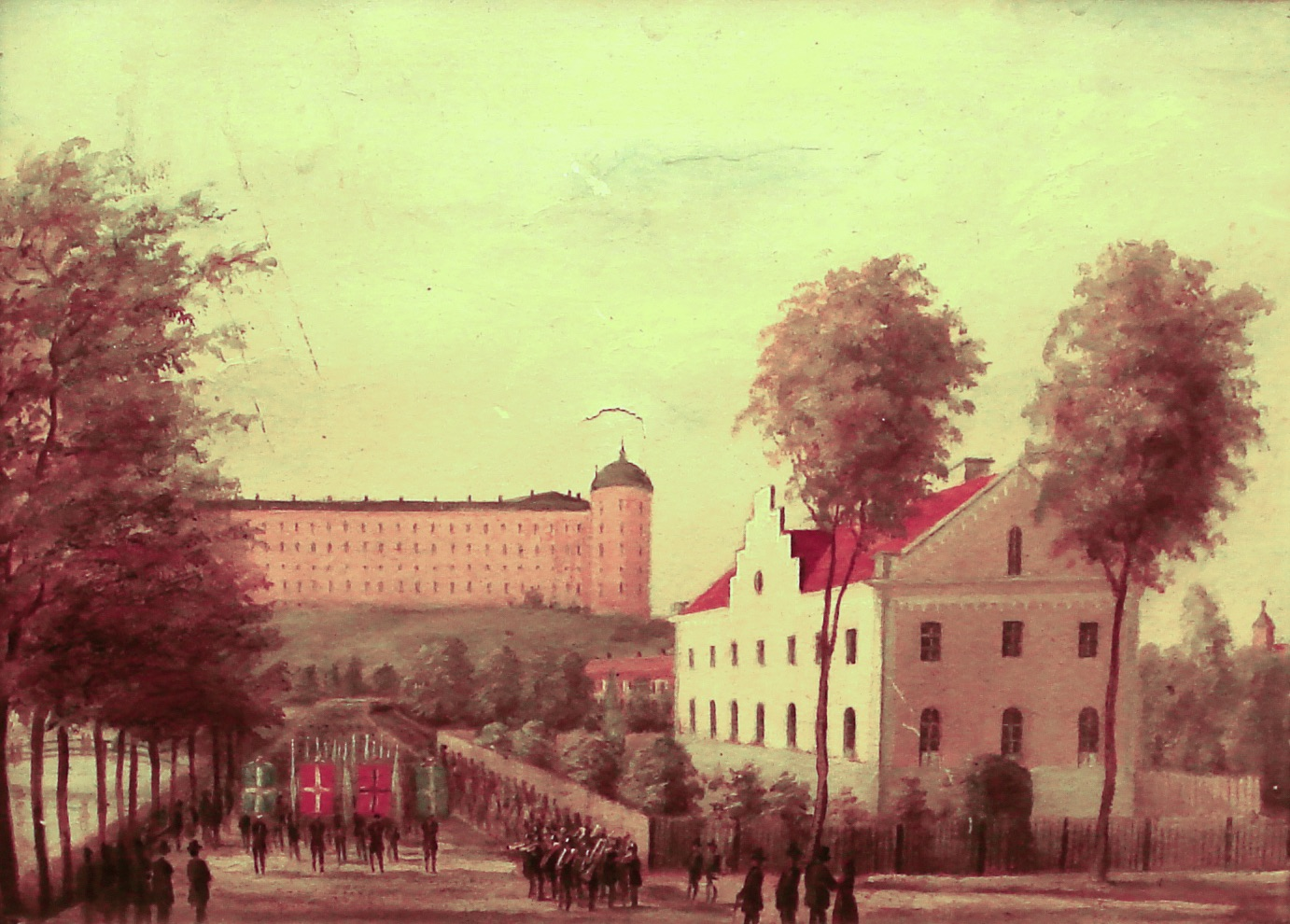
An 1856 meeting of Scandinavian students in Uppsala, Sweden, with a parade marching next to Svandammen

Scandinavism (Danish: skandinavisme; Norwegian: skandinavisme; Swedish: skandinavism; Icelandic: skandinavismi), also called Scandinavianism or pan-Scandinavianism, is an ideology that supports various degrees of cooperation among the Scandinavian countries. Scandinavism comprises the literary, linguistic and cultural movement that focuses on promoting a shared Scandinavian past, a shared cultural heritage, a common Scandinavian mythology and a common language or dialect continuum (from the common ancestor language of Old Norse) and which led to the formation of joint periodicals and societies in support of Scandinavian literature and languages. The movement was most popular among Danes and Swedes.

== History ==
According to the Norwegian historian Sverre Bagge, prior to the formation of state-like kingdoms, Scandinavia was culturally and linguistically homogeneous.

Pan-Scandinavianism as a modern movement originated in the 19th century, but the movement had already begun spreading a century earlier in circles of literature and science. The Pan-Scandinavian movement paralleled the unification movements of Germany and Italy. As opposed to the German and Italian counterparts, the Scandinavian state-building project was not successful and is no longer pursued. It was at its height in the mid-19th century and supported the idea of Scandinavian unity.

The movement was initiated by Danish and Swedish university students in the 1840s, with a base in Scania. In the beginning, the political establishments in the two countries, including the absolute monarch Christian VIII and Charles XIV John with his "one-man government", were suspicious of the movement. The movement was a significant force from 1846 to 1864, but the movement eventually dwindled and had strong support only among the Swedish-speaking population of Finland.

The collapse of Pan-Scandinavianism came in 1864 when the Second Schleswig-Holstein War broke out. King Charles XV of Sweden (who was also King Charles IV of Norway), who reigned from 1859 until his death in 1872, in spite of championing Pan-Scandinivianism, failed to help Denmark in the war.

The author Hans Christian Andersen became an adherent of Scandinavism after a visit to Sweden in 1837, and committed himself to writing a poem that would convey the relatedness of Swedes, Danes and Norwegians. It was in July 1839, during a visit to the island of Funen in Denmark, that Andersen first wrote the text of his poem, Jeg er en Skandinav ("I am a Scandinavian"). Andersen composed the poem to capture "the beauty of the Nordic spirit, the way the three sister nations have gradually grown together", as part of a Scandinavian national anthem. Composer Otto Lindblad set the poem to music, and the composition was published in January 1840. Its popularity peaked in 1845, after which it was seldom sung.

In 1923, the Clara Lachmann Foundation was established with the goal of promoting Scandinavian unity through culture.

== See also ==
- Nordic Council
- Nordic Language Convention
- Nordic Passport Union
- Nordic student meeting
- Pan-nationalism
- Scandinavian defence union
- Nordic Defence Cooperation
- Viking revival
- Kalmar Union
- Nordic Resistance Movement
