= Futako Shrine =

Shinto shrine in Kanagawa Prefecture, Japan

Futako Shrine 二子神社
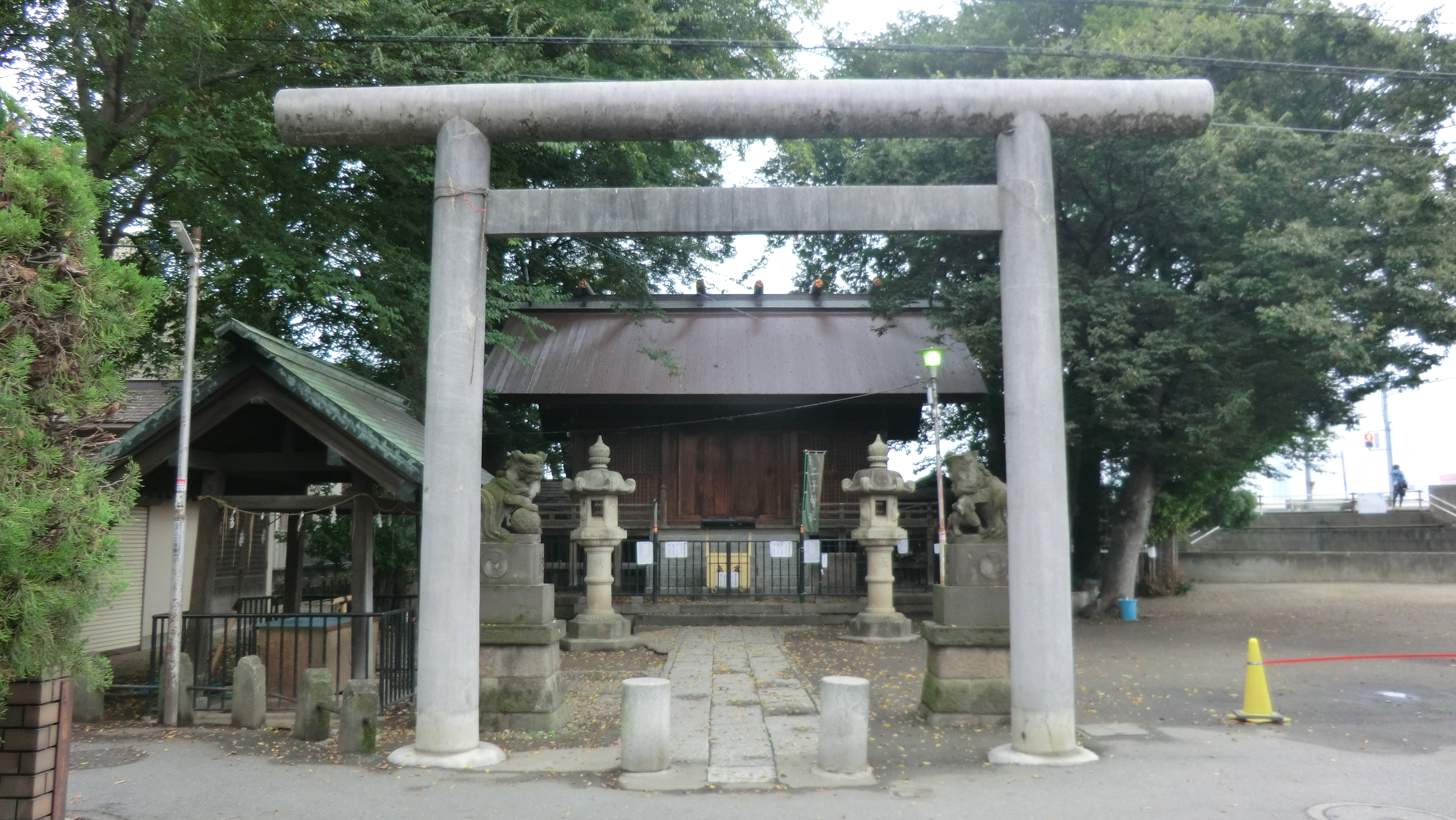

- Location within Japan

Religion
- Affiliation: Shinto

Location
- Location: Futako 1-2-18, Takatsu-ku, Kawasaki city, Kawasaki prefecture
- Coordinates: 35.6087°N 139.6214°E

Website
- www.mizonokuchijinjya.org/kenmu.html

Futako shrine (二子神社, Futako jinja), located in Takatsu-ku, Kawasaki, is a Shinto shrine in Kanagawa prefecture, Japan. It was established in 1641 and was called "Shinmeisha". It was renamed "Futako Shrine" in the Meiji Era, after the area in which it is located.

== Features ==
It is known for the "Kanoko Monument" sculpture next to the shrine. The sculpture was made by the artist Tarō Okamoto, who was born locally. The sculpture is dedicated to the artist's mother, Kanoko Okamoto.

== Gallery ==
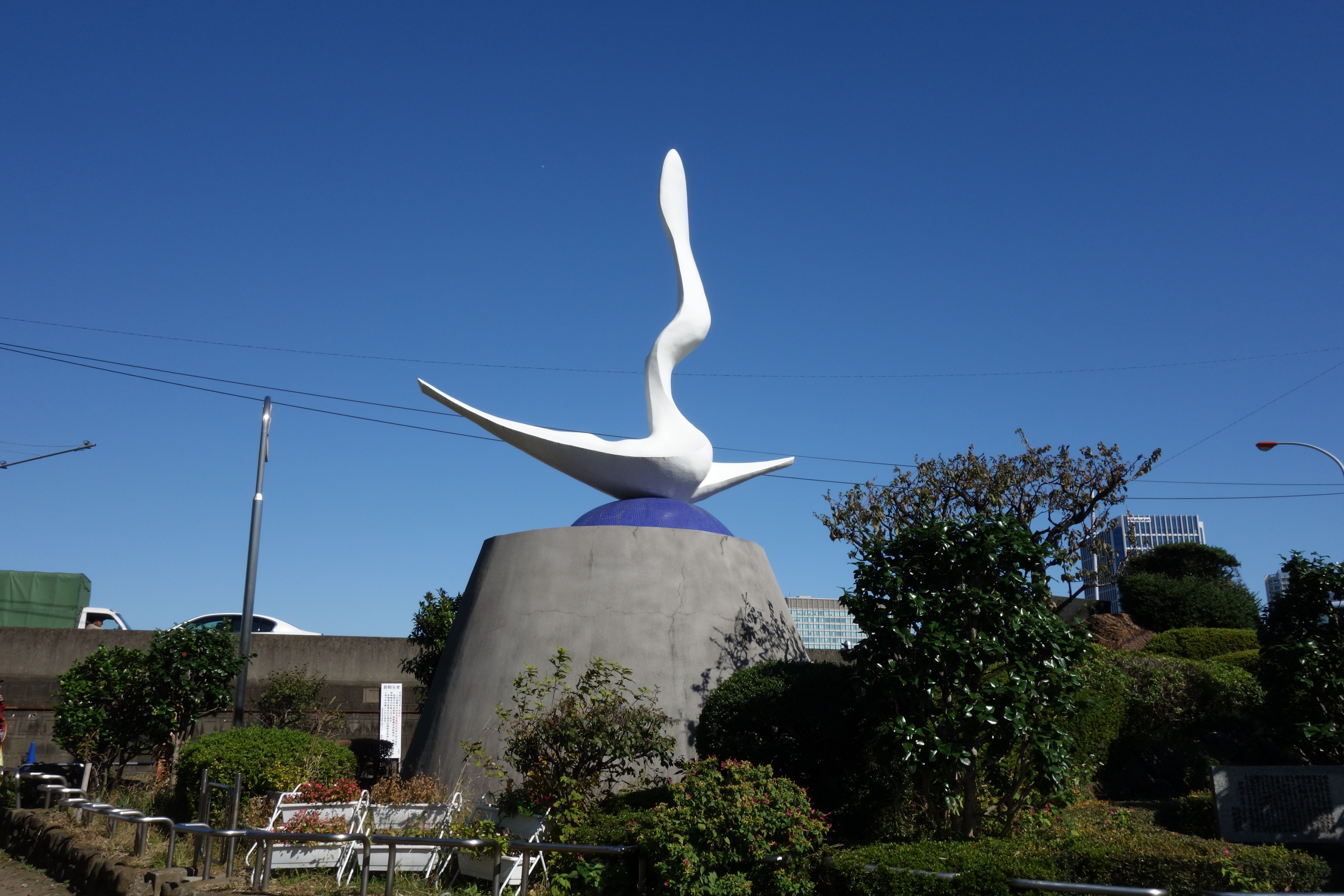
"Kanoko monument" by Tarō Okamoto

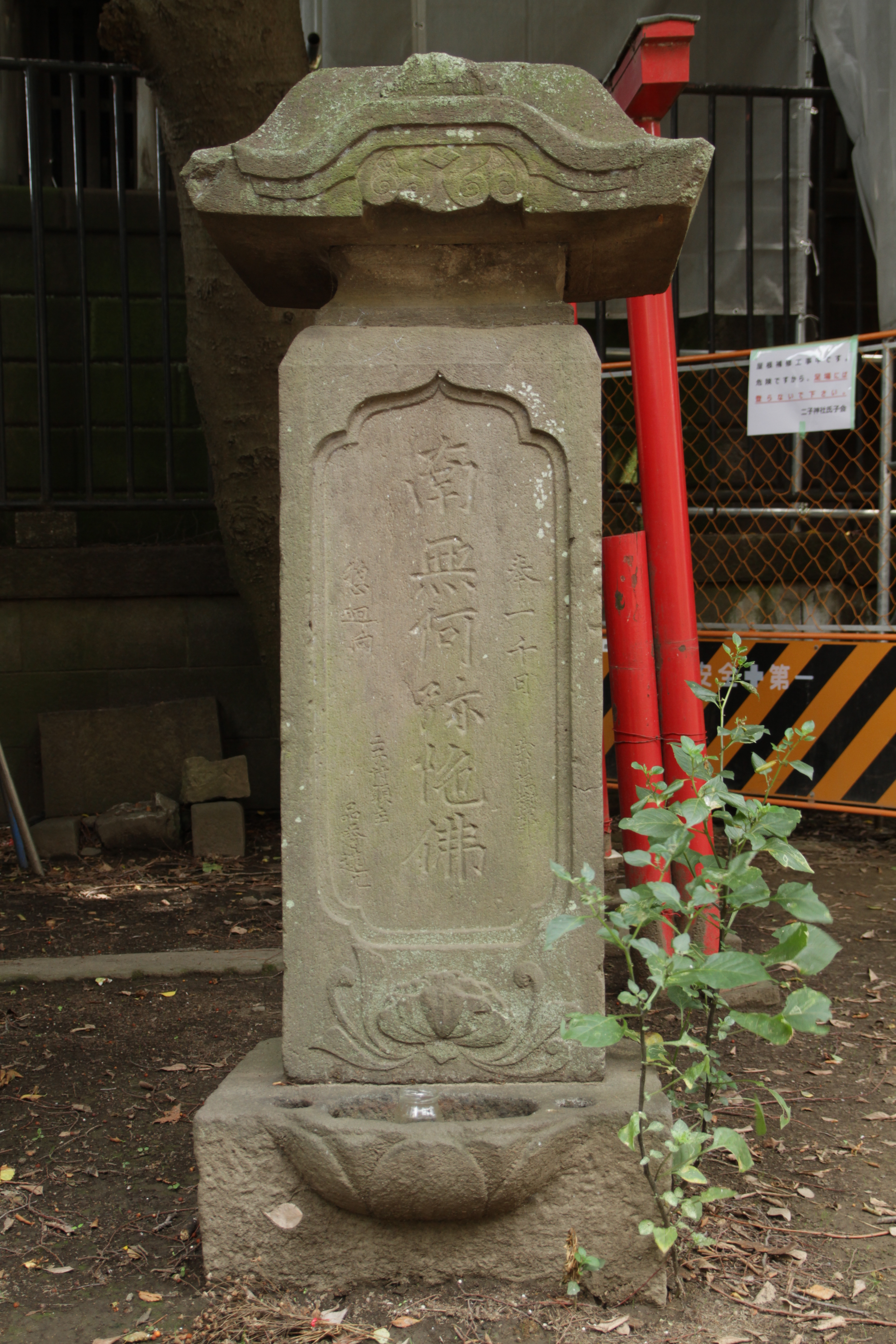
Sixth column name

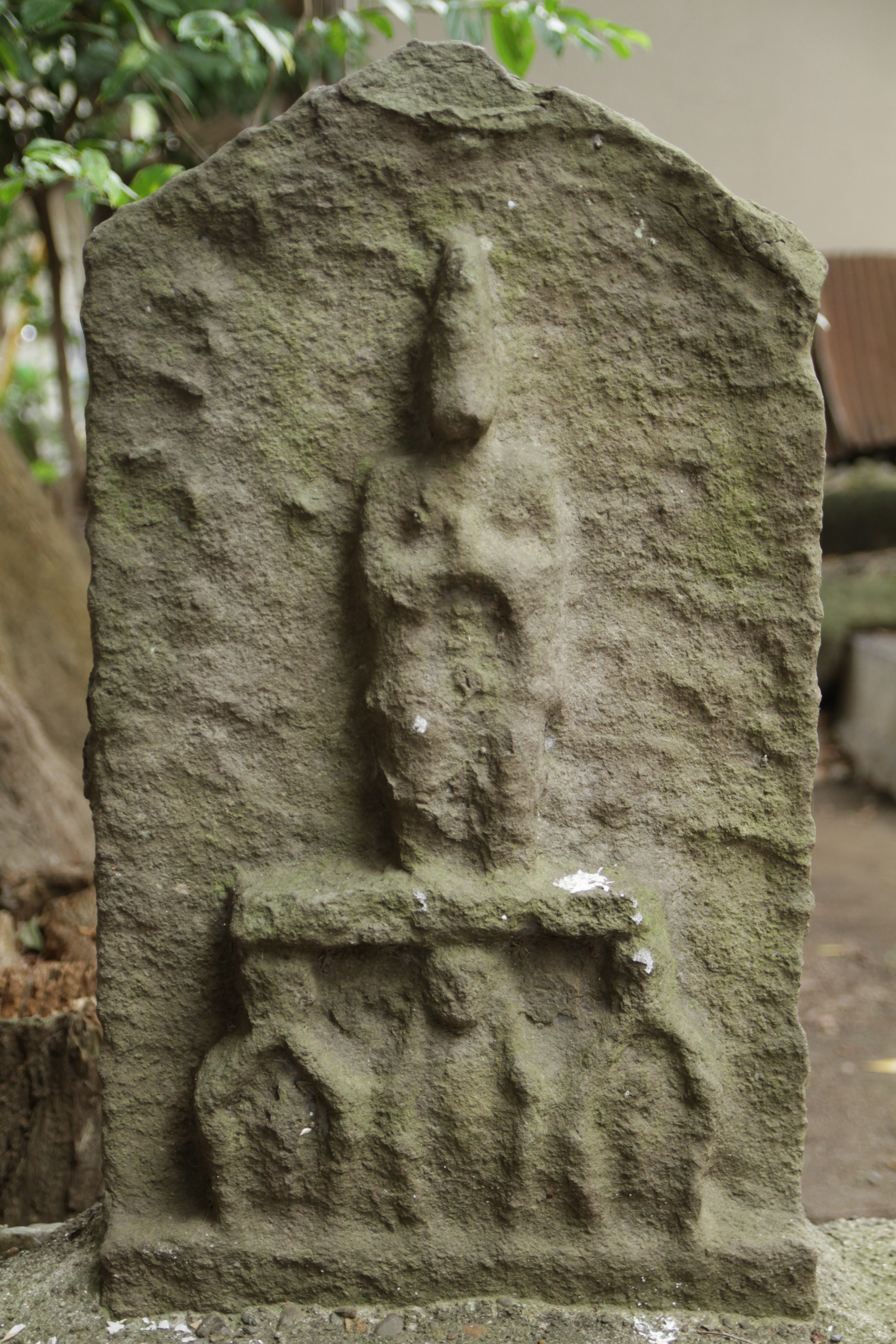
Kōshin-tō

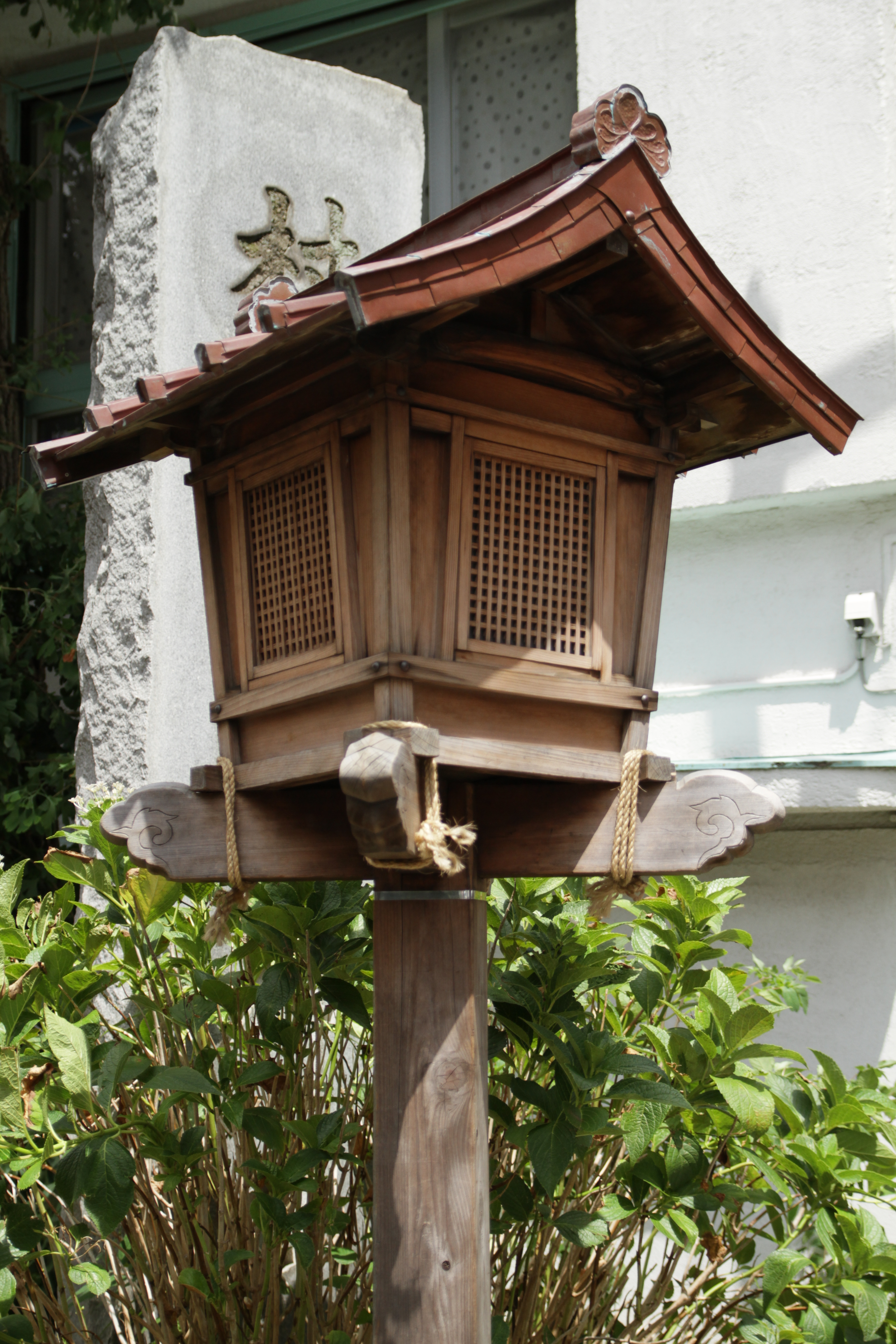
Oyama lantern at the shrine entrance

The outer torii

Chōzuya (visitors' washing place)

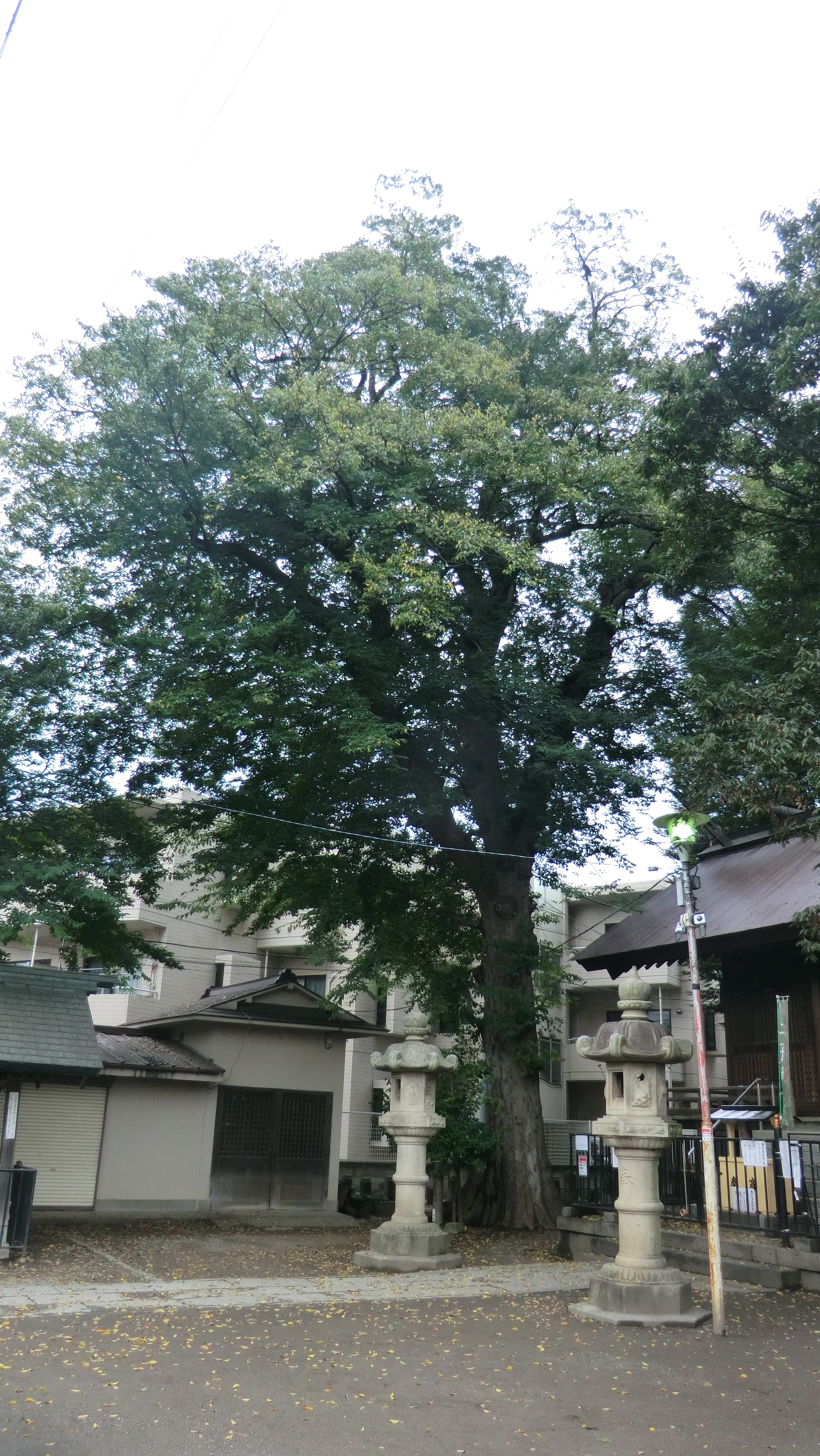
"Mukunoki", one of Kawasaki City's 50 selected trees

== See also ==
- List of Shinto shrines
