= Takatsu Station =

Takatsu Station may refer to:

- Takatsu Station (Kanagawa), a railway station in Kanagawa, Japan
- Takatsu Station (Kyoto), a railway station in Kyoto, Japan
