= Ekoji Buddhist Temple =

Temple in Virginia, US

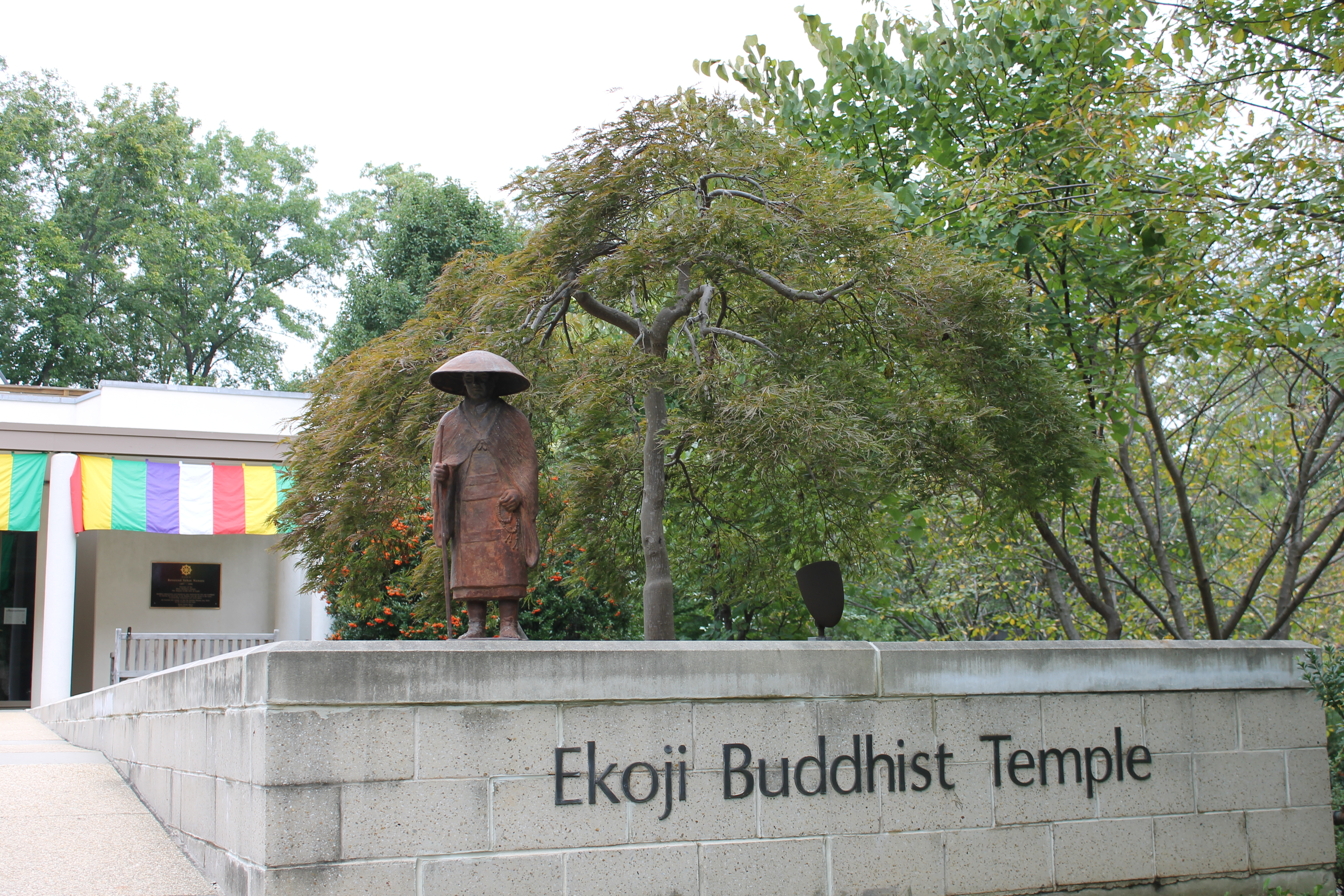
- Entrance to Ekoji Buddhist Temple

Religion
- Affiliation: Jōdo Shinshū Buddhism

Location
- Location: 6500 Lakehaven Lane; Fairfax Station, Virginia
- Country: United States
- Interactive map of Ekoji Buddhist Temple
- Coordinates: 38°46′26″N 77°18′2.6″W

Architecture
- Founder: Rev. Kenryu Tsuji and Rev. Dr. Yehan Numata
- Established: 1981

Website
- ekoji.org

Ekoji (恵光寺, Ekō-ji) is a temple of the Jōdo Shinshū Hongwanji-ha Japanese Buddhist sect in Fairfax Station, Virginia, near Washington, D.C. It is a member of the Buddhist Churches of America, the oldest Buddhist organization in the mainland United States.

Ekoji (literally in Japanese, "Temple of the Gift of Light") was founded in 1981; its initial location was an office condominium building located in Springfield, Virginia, and a larger temple was constructed in Fairfax Station, Virginia, in 1998. The temple was established through the beneficial efforts of the late Rev. Kenryu Tsuji (1919-2004), the former Bishop of the Buddhist Churches of America, and the late Rev. Dr. Yehan Numata, a Japanese businessman and devout Jodo Shinshu Buddhist. He also established the Bukkyo Dendo Kyokai ("Society for the Promotion of Buddhism") to help spread Buddhism throughout the world.

Reverend Nariaki Hayashi became the full-time resident minister in 2016. However, as of 2022, he has left to be the minister of the Tri-State Denver Buddhist Temple.

As of 2023, Ekoji has a chapter of the Young Buddhist Association.

The temple serves as the headquarters for the taiko drumming ensemble Nen Daiko.

There are several Ekoji Temples in Japan, as well as in Düsseldorf, Germany and Mexico City.

== See also ==
- Buddhism in the United States
- Buddhism in the West
- Glossary of Japanese Buddhism
