= Institute of Buddhist Studies =

Buddhist seminary and graduate school in Berkeley, California

- Type: Private, non-profit
- Established: 1949
- Affiliations: Buddhist Churches of America, Graduate Theological Union
- Endowment: $15.9M (2021)
- Chancellor: Marvin Harada
- President: Scott A. Mitchell
- Dean: Takashi Miyaji
- Students: 53
- Location: 2140 Durant Ave, Berkeley, California, United States; 37.866787°N 122.265945°W
- Website: www.shin-ibs.edu

The Institute of Buddhist Studies is a Jodo Shinshu-affiliated seminary and graduate school, located in Berkeley, California. It is a member school of the Graduate Theological Union, also located in Berkeley. Its mission is to provide graduate level education in the entirety of the Buddhist tradition with specialization in Jodo Shinshu ministry and Buddhist chaplaincy. It is the sole seminary for ministers serving temples in the United States through the Buddhist Churches of America, the U.S. mainland branch district of the Nishi Hongwanji sect of Japanese Buddhism.

== History ==
Following the incarceration of Japanese Americans during World War II, nisei ("second generation") Buddhists in California desired to create an educational program for American-born ministers or priests. Supported by the Buddhist Churches of America, a study program was established in 1949 at the Berkeley Buddhist Temple and overseen by Rev. Kanmo Imamura and his wife Jane. Prior to this, all US ministers were educated and trained in Japan.

In 1966, the BCA purchased a building in Berkeley to house the study center. With support of BCA Bishops Shinsho Hanayama and Kenryu Tsuji, the IBS incorporated with the State of California as a graduate school and seminary in 1969.

Under the direction of Bishop Seigen Yamaoka, in 1985 IBS became an affiliate of the Graduate Theological Union. In 2021, the GTU accepted IBS as a full member school, the first non-Christian seminary to be a member school.

Under the leadership of President David Matsumoto and Dean Scott Mitchell, IBS was granted accreditation by the Western Association of Schools and Colleges in 2020.

== Educational programs ==
The Institute of Buddhist Studies offers two graduate degree programs:

1. Master of Arts in Buddhist Studies (M.A.B.S.)
2. Master of Divinity (M.Div.)

The Institute of Buddhist Studies also offers five online certificate programs which may be completed concurrently within a degree program to focus one's studies and certify competence in a particular field of study, or may be completed as stand-alone programs:

1. Certificate in Buddhist Studies
2. Certificate in Shin Buddhist Studies
3. Certificate in Sōtō Zen Buddhist Studies
4. Certificate in Theravada Buddhist Studies
5. Certificate in Buddhist Chaplaincy

== Publications ==
The Institute of Buddhist Studies publishes an academic journal, the Pacific World, and has partnered with several other organizations to produce journals and book series:

- Pacific World: Journal of Institute of Buddhist Studies
- Contemporary Issues in Buddhist Studies book series
- Pure Land Buddhist Studies book series
- The Pure Land: Journal of the International Association of Shin Buddhist Studies
- The Buddhist Forum
- The Journal of Buddhist Literature
- IBS Monograph Series
- Publications of the Center for Contemporary Shin Buddhist Studies
