= NKK switches =

Japanese switch manufacturer

NKK SWITCHES Co., Ltd.
- Native name: NKKスイッチズ株式会社
- Company type: Public KK
- Traded as: JASDAQ: 6943
- ISIN: JP3691400000
- Industry: Electrical equipment
- Founded: December 11, 1953; 72 years ago
- Headquarters: Takatsu-ku, Kawasaki, Kanagawa Prefecture, 213-8553, Japan
- Area served: Worldwide
- Key people: Tomoshige Ohashi (CEO)
- Products: Industrial switches
- Revenue: ▲JPY 7.9 billion (FY 2017) (US$ 74.9 million) (FY 2017)
- Net income: ▲JPY 159.7 million (FY 2017) (US$ 1.5 million) (FY 2017)
- Number of employees: 263 (consolidated, as of March 31, 2018)
- Website: Official website

NKK SWITCHES Co., Ltd. (NKKスイッチズ株式会社, NKK Suitchizu Kabushiki-gaisha) (formerly Nihon Kaiheiki Kogyo Co., Ltd.) is a designer and manufacturer of diversified industrial operational switches. The company offers illuminated, process sealed, miniature, specialty, surface mount and LCD programmable switches. The company also manufactures toggle, rocker, pushbutton, slide, DIP, rotary, keypad and keylock switches.

== Affiliates ==
- NKK Switches of America, Inc. (Scottsdale, AZ)
- NKK Switches Hong Kong Co., Ltd. (Hong Kong)
- NKK Switches Mactan, Inc. (Philippines)
