= Ryukoku University =

Private university in Kyoto, Japan

Coordinates: 34°57′50″N 135°46′0″E

- 龍谷大学
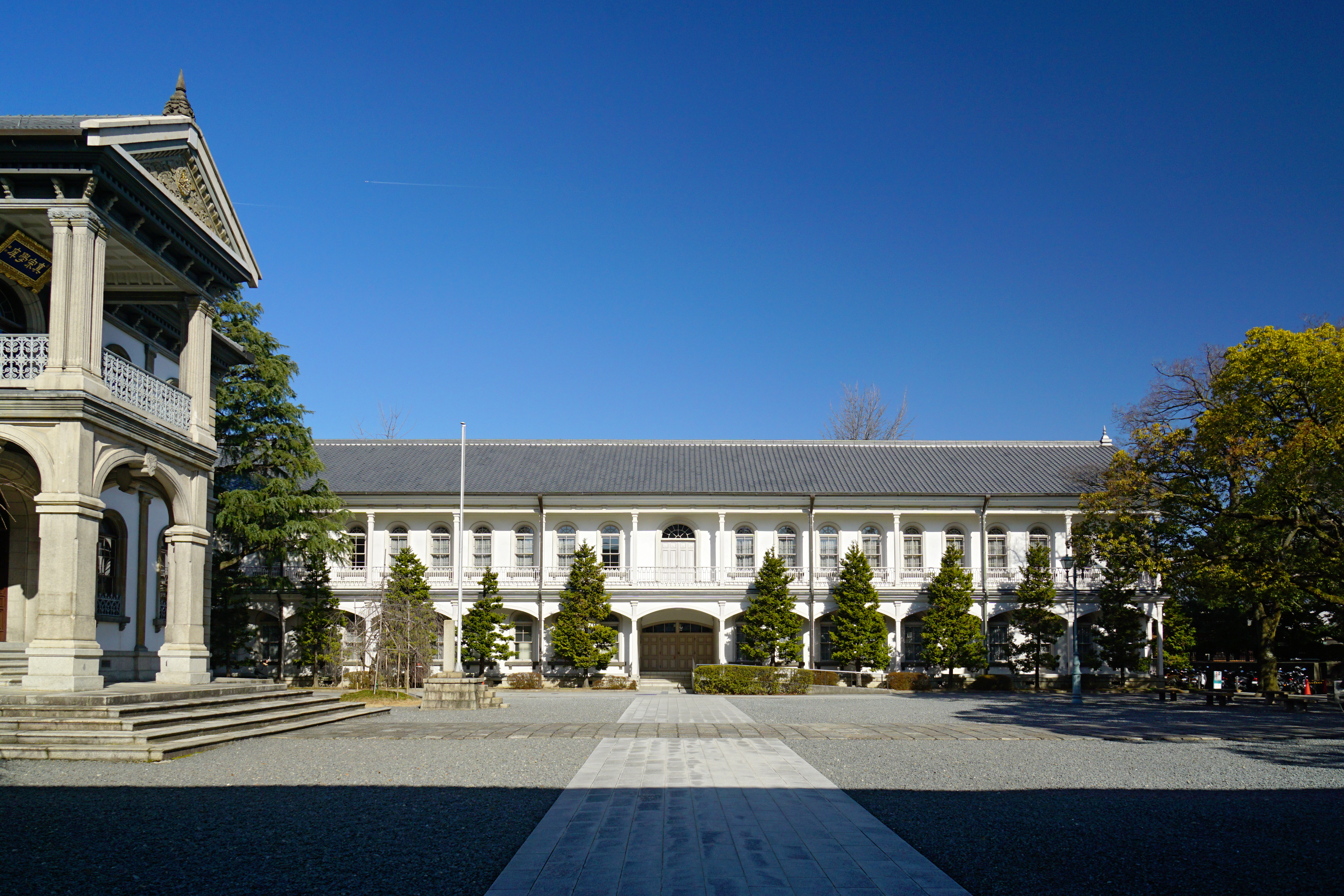
- Omiya Campus in January 2017
- Motto: You, Unlimited
- Type: Private
- Established: 1639
- President: Takashi Irisawa
- Students: 21,358
- Undergraduates: 20,754
- Postgraduates: 604
- Location: Kyoto and Otsu, Shiga, Japan
- Campus: Urban
- Website: Official website

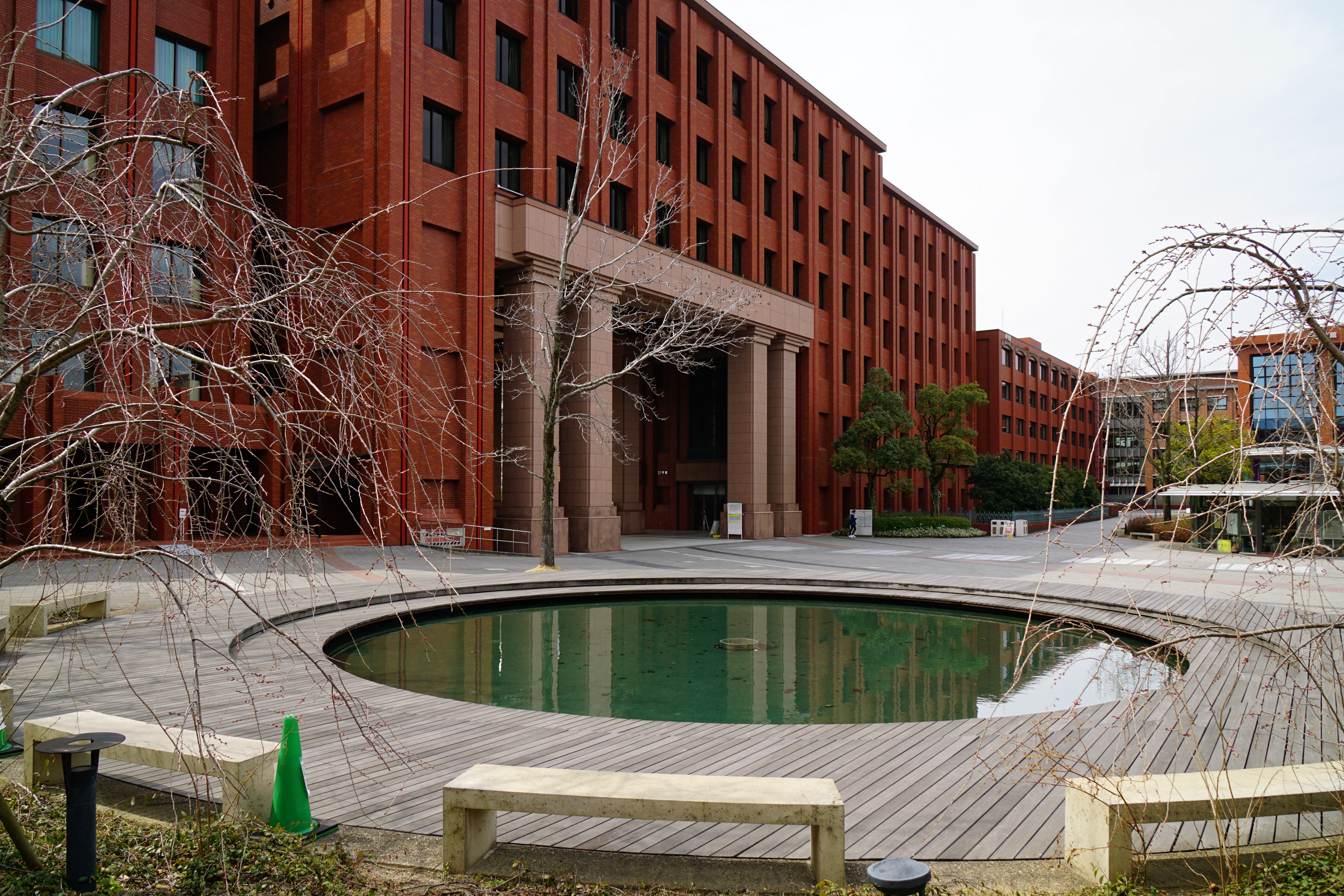
Fukakusa campus

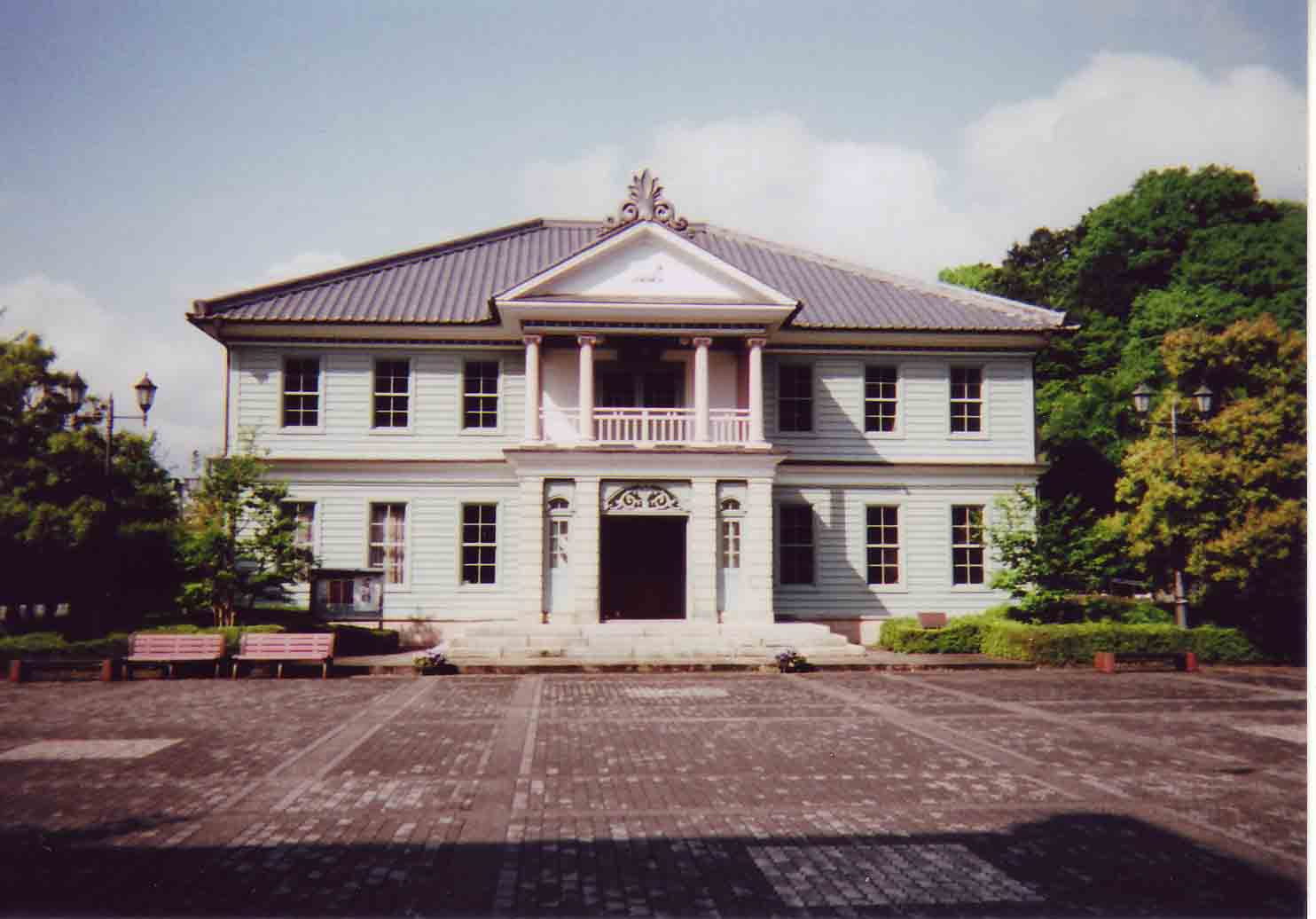
Jushinkan in Seta campus

Ryukoku University (龍谷大学, Ryūkoku Daigaku) is a private university in Kyoto, Japan.

It was founded as a school for Buddhist priests of the Nishi Hongan-ji denomination in 1639, and became a secularized university in 1876. The university's professors and students founded the literary magazine Chūōkōron in 1887. It has three campuses: Fukakusa and Omiya in Kyoto; and Seta in Shiga prefecture. Its campuses are smoke-free. It is one university belongs to "San-Kin-Ko-Ryu"(産近甲龍), a group of semi-major private universities in the Kansai area.

== Faculties ==
Undergraduate Schools

- Faculty of Letters
- Faculty of Economics
- Faculty of Business Administration
- Faculty of Law
- Faculty of International Studies
- Faculty of Advanced Science and Technology
- Faculty of Sociology
- Faculty of Policy Studies
- Faculty of Agriculture
- Faculty of Psychology

Graduate Schools

- Graduate School of Letters
- Graduate School of Economics
- Graduate School of Business Administration
- Graduate School of Law
- Graduate School of Policy Science
- Graduate School of International Studies
- Graduate School of Science and Technology
- Graduate School of Sociology
- Graduate School of Practical Shin Buddhist Studies
- Graduate School of Agriculture

== Notable alumni ==
- Yuji Fujii, a member of the House of Representatives in the Diet (national legislature)
- Ayano Tsuji, singer-songwriter.
- Takamaro Shigaraki, Buddhologist, later president of the university
- Kenryu Takashi Tsuji, Japanese-Canadian Buddhist leader

== See also ==
- List of National Treasures of Japan (writings)
