= Takatsu-ku =

Takatsu 高津区
- Ward
- Takatsu Ward
- Flag

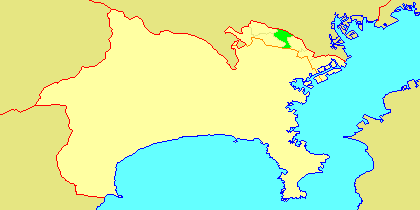
- Location of Takatsu in Kanagawa

- Coordinates: 35°35′58″N 139°36′29″E
- Country: Japan
- Region: Kantō
- Prefecture: Kanagawa
- City: Kawasaki
- Established: April 1, 1972

Area
  - Total: 16.38 km^{2} (6.32 sq mi)

Population (March 2010)
  - Total: 215,158
  - Density: 13,150/km^{2} (34,100/sq mi)
- Time zone: UTC+9 (Japan Standard Time)
- Tree: Ume
- Flower: Narcissus
- Address: 2-8-1 Shimosakunobe, Takatsu-ku Kawasaki-shi, Kanagawa-ken; 213-8570
- Website: Takatsu Ward Office

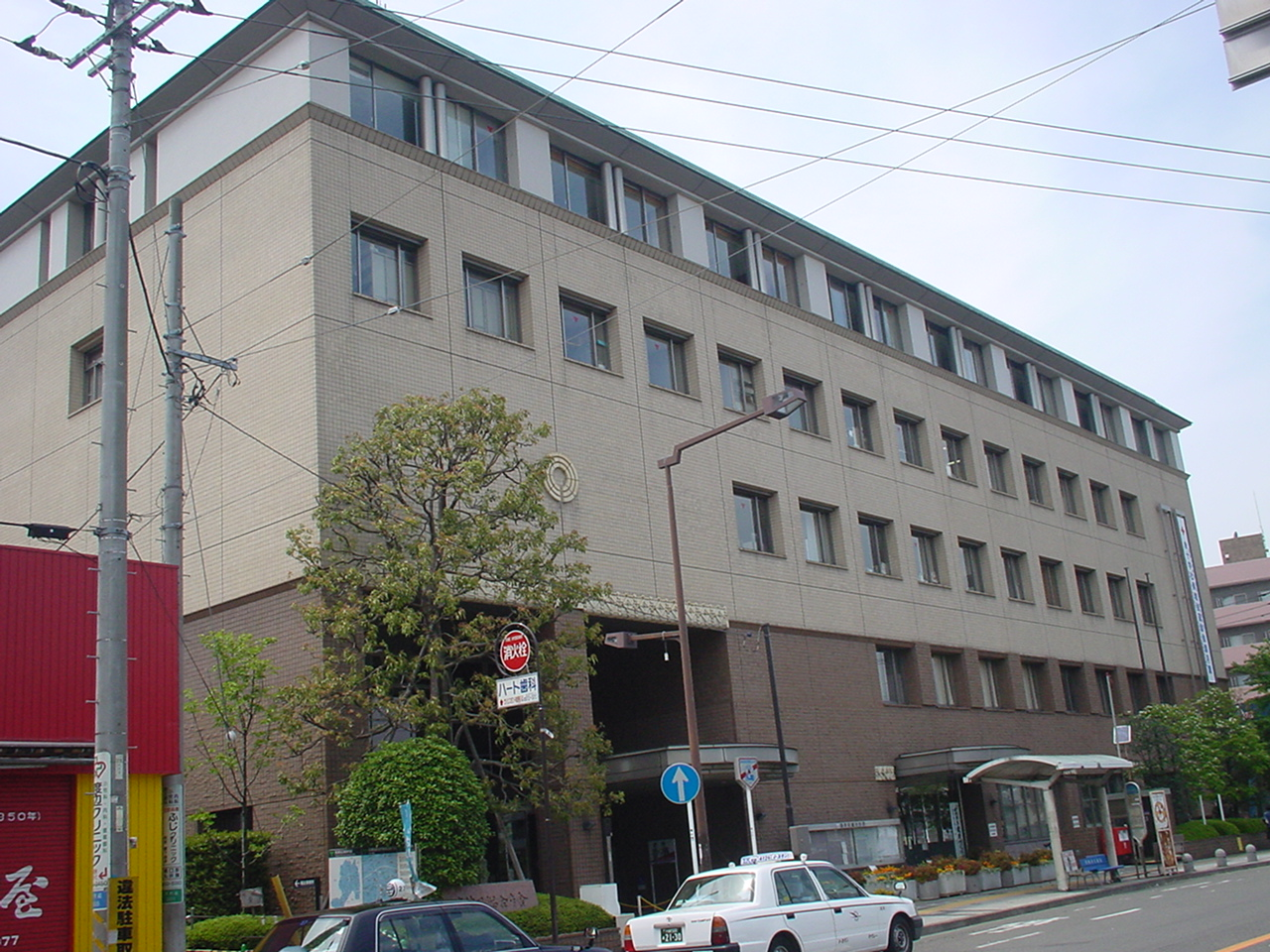
Takatsu Ward Office

Takatsu-ku (高津区) is one of the 7 wards of the city of Kawasaki in Kanagawa Prefecture, Japan. As of 2010, the ward had an estimated population of 215,158 and a density of 13,150 persons per km^{2}. The total area is 16.38 km^{2}.

== Geography ==
Takatsu Ward is located in eastern Kanagawa Prefecture, in the north-center portion of the city of Kawasaki, bordering on Tokyo. It is bordered to the north by the Tama River.

=== Surrounding municipalities ===
- Tama-ku, Kawasaki
- Miyamae-ku, Kawasaki
- Nakahara-ku, Kawasaki
- Kōhoku-ku, Yokohama
- Tsuzuki-ku, Yokohama
- Setagaya-ku, Tokyo

== Neighborhoods ==
Mizonokuchi, Futago, Seta, Suwa, Kitamigata, Shimonoge, Hisamoto, Sakado, Kuji, Unane, Shimo-Sakunobe, Kami-Sakunobe, Mukaigaoka, Suenaga, Kajigaya, Shinsaku, Chitose, Chitose-Shin-cho, Shibokuchi, Shibokuchi-Fujimi-dai, Hisasue, Kanigaya, Akutsu, and Nogawa.

== History ==
Archaeologists have found stone tools from the Japanese Paleolithic period and ceramic shards from the Jōmon period at numerous locations in the area. Under the Nara period Ritsuryō system, it became part of Tachibana District Musashi Province. By the Heian period it was part of a shōen coming under control the Later Hōjō clan from Odawara in the late Muromachi period. In the Edo period, it was administered as tenryō territory controlled directly by the Tokugawa shogunate, but administered through various hatamoto. After the Meiji Restoration, the area was divided into eight villages within Tachibana District in the new Kanagawa Prefecture on April 1, 1889. These areas were annexed by the neighboring city of Kawasaki from 1937 to 1938. The area became part of a huge government sponsored housing project from the 1950s and 1960s. The area became part of Tama Ward with the division of the city of Kawasaki into wards from April 1972. In July 1982, Miyamae Ward was separated from Takatsu Ward.

== Economy ==
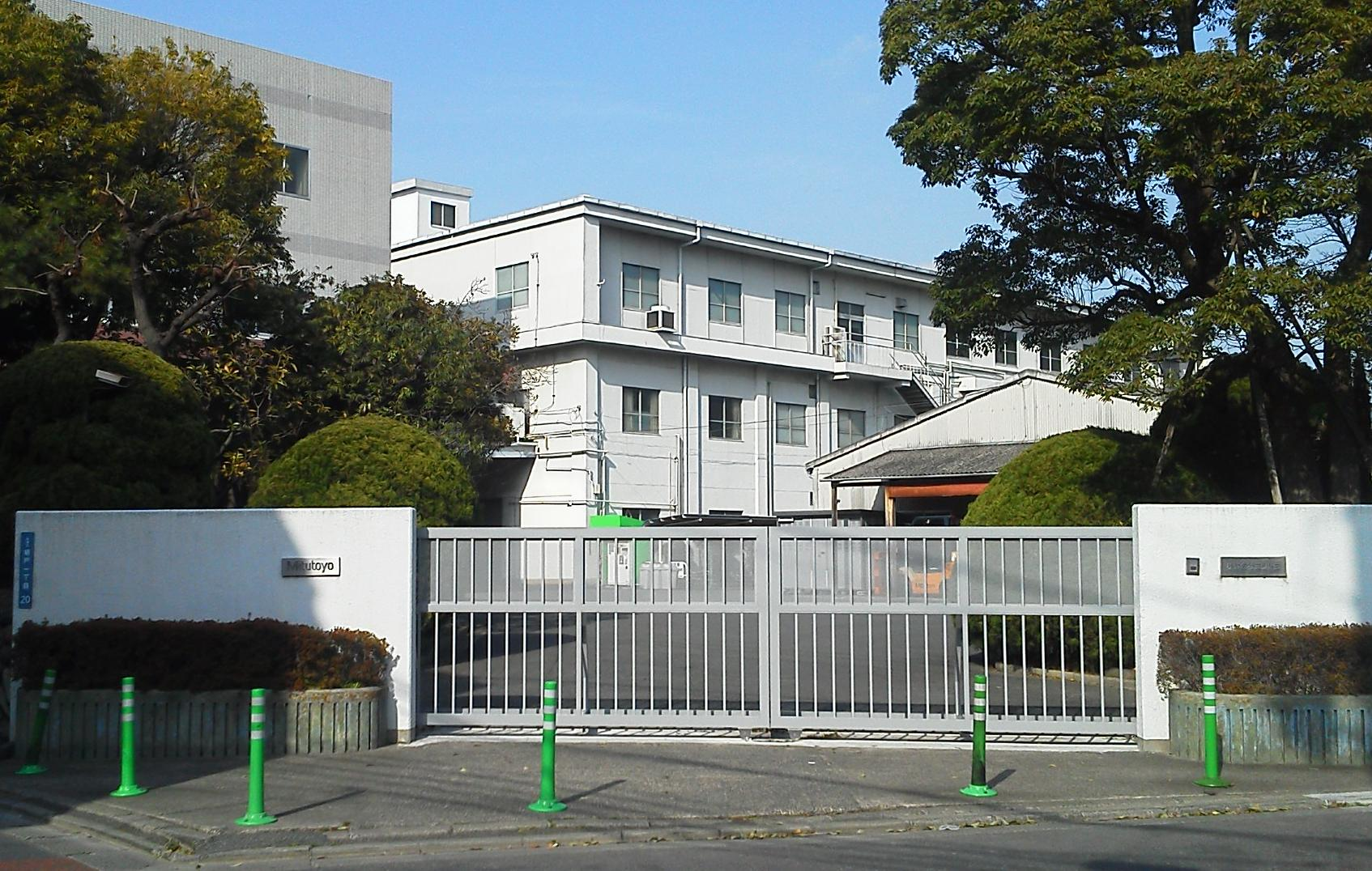
Mitutoyo headquarters

Takatsu Ward is largely a regional commercial center and bedroom community for central Kawasaki and Tokyo. Industries are centered on food processing, electronics and precision equipment, and include:

- The corporate headquarters of Mitutoyo and NKK Switches
- Fujitsu General (富士通ゼネラル)
- Fujitsu Access (富士通アクセス)
- Bunkyodo (文教堂)
- Kanagawa Science Park (かながわサイエンスパーク) - a business incubation center. [ also Research center for L'oreal company.]

== Transportation ==
=== Railway ===
- JR East - Nambu Line
  - Musashi-Mizonokuchi - Tsudayama - Kuji
- Tokyu Corporation – Tōkyū Den-en-toshi Line / Tōkyū Ōimachi Line
  - Futako-Shinchi - Takatsu - Mizonokuchi - Kajigaya (through service to Tokyo Metro Hanzomon Line and Tobu Isesaki Line)

=== Highway ===
- Japan National Route 246 (Atsugi-Oyama Road, as "Atsugi-Kaido" (厚木街道) or "Oyama-Kaido" (大山街道))
- National Route 409 (Fuchu Road, as "Fuchu-Kaido" (府中街道))
- National Route 466 (No. 3 Keihin Road, as "Daisan-Keihin" (第三京浜))

== Education ==
- Senzoku Gakuen College of Music

Municipal junior high schools:

- Higashitakatsu (東高津中学校)
- Higashitachibana (東橘中学校)
- Nishitakatsu (西高津中学校)
- Tachibana (橘中学校)
- Takatsu (高津中学校)

Municipal elementary schools:

- Higashi Takatsu (東高津小学校)
- Hisamoto (久本小学校)
- Hisasue (久末小学校)
- Kajigaya (梶ヶ谷小学校)
- Kamisakunobe (上作延小学校)
- Kuji (久地小学校)
- Minamihara (南原小学校)
- Nishi Kajigaya (西梶ヶ谷小学校)
- Sakado (坂戸小学校)
- Shibokuchi (子母口小学校)
- Shimosakunobe (下作延小学校)
- Shinsaku (新作小学校)
- Suenaga (末長小学校)
- Tachibana (橘小学校)
- Takatsu (高津小学校)

There is a North Korean school, Nambu Korean Primary School (南武朝鮮初級学校).

== Shrines and temples ==
- Futako Shrine

== Noted people from Takatsu Ward ==
- Tarō Okamoto, artist
- Yoshinobu Minowa, professional soccer player
- Masahiro Abe, professional baseball player
- Riko Narumi, actress
- Eugene Tzigane, conductor
