= Takatsu Station (Kanagawa) =

Railway station in Kawasaki, Kanagawa Prefecture, Japan

Takatsu Station 高津駅

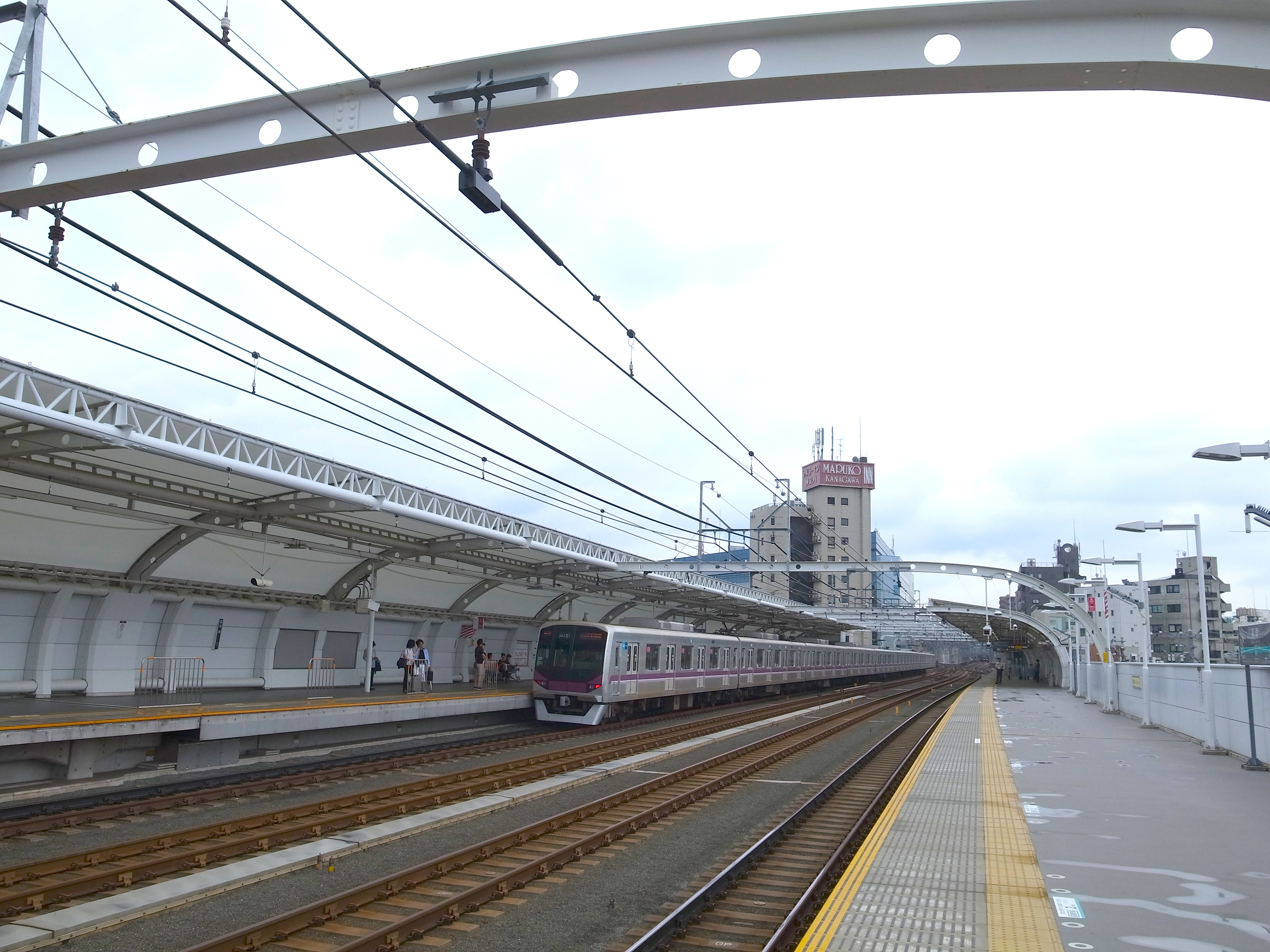
- The station platforms in August 2014

General information
- Location: 4 Futago, Takatsu Ward, Kawasaki City; Kanagawa Prefecture 213-0002; Japan
- Coordinates: 35.603263°N 139.616763°E
- Operator: Tōkyū Railways
- Lines: Den-en-toshi Line; Ōimachi Line
- Distance: 10.7 km (6.6 mi) from Shibuya
- Platforms: 2 side platforms
- Tracks: 4
- Connections: Bus terminal

Construction
- Structure type: Elevated

Other information
- Station code: DT09
- Website: Official website

History
- Opened: 15 July 1927; 99 years ago

Passengers
- FY2019: 32,388

Services
Preceding station	Tōkyū Railways	Following station
Mizonokuchi towards Chūō-rinkan	Den-en-toshi Line Local	Futako-shinchi towards Shibuya
Mizonokuchi Terminus	Ōimachi Line Local	Futako-shinchi towards Ōimachi
Location
- Location within Tokyo Bay and Bōsō Peninsula Location within Kanagawa Prefecture Location within Japan

Takatsu Station (高津駅, Takatsu-eki) is a passenger railway station located in Takatsu-ku, Kawasaki, Kanagawa Prefecture, Japan, operated by the private railway company Tokyu Corporation.

== Lines ==
Takatsu Station is served by the Tōkyū Den-en-toshi Line from Shibuya in Tokyo to Chūō-Rinkan in Kanagawa Prefecture, and by the Tōkyū Ōimachi Line. It is 10.7 kilometers from the starting point of the Tōkyū Den-en-toshi Line at Shibuya and 11.7 kilometers from the terminus of the Tōkyū Ōimachi Line at Ōimachi Station.

== Station layout ==
The station consists of four tracks and two elevated opposed side platforms and an elevated station. The two center tracks are used only for through traffic.

=== Platforms ===
1	Tōkyū Den-en-toshi Line	for Saginuma, Nagatsuta, and Chūō-rinkan
1	Tōkyū Ōimachi Line	for Mizonokuchi; Tōkyū Den-en-toshi Line for Saginuma and Nagatsuta
2	■ For Passing	-
3	■ For Passing	-
4	Tōkyū Den-en-toshi Line	for Shibuya; Tokyo Metro Hanzomon Line for Oshiage; Tobu Skytree Line for Tōbu-Dōbutsu-Kōen; Tobu Isesaki Line for Kuki; Tobu Nikko Line for Minami-kurihashi
4	Tōkyū Ōimachi Line	for Futako-Tamagawa, Jiyūgaoka, and Ōimachi

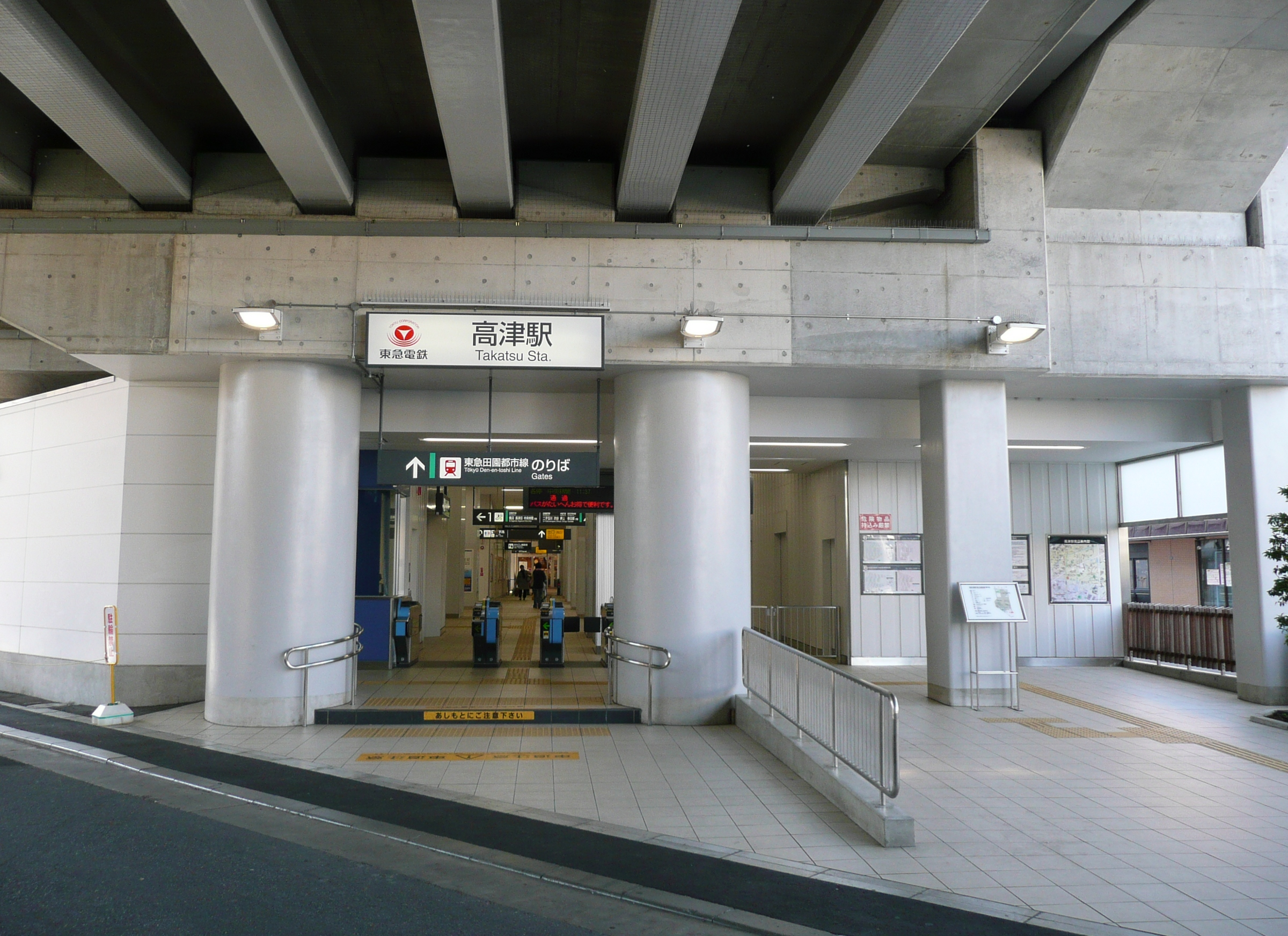
The east entrance in November 2011

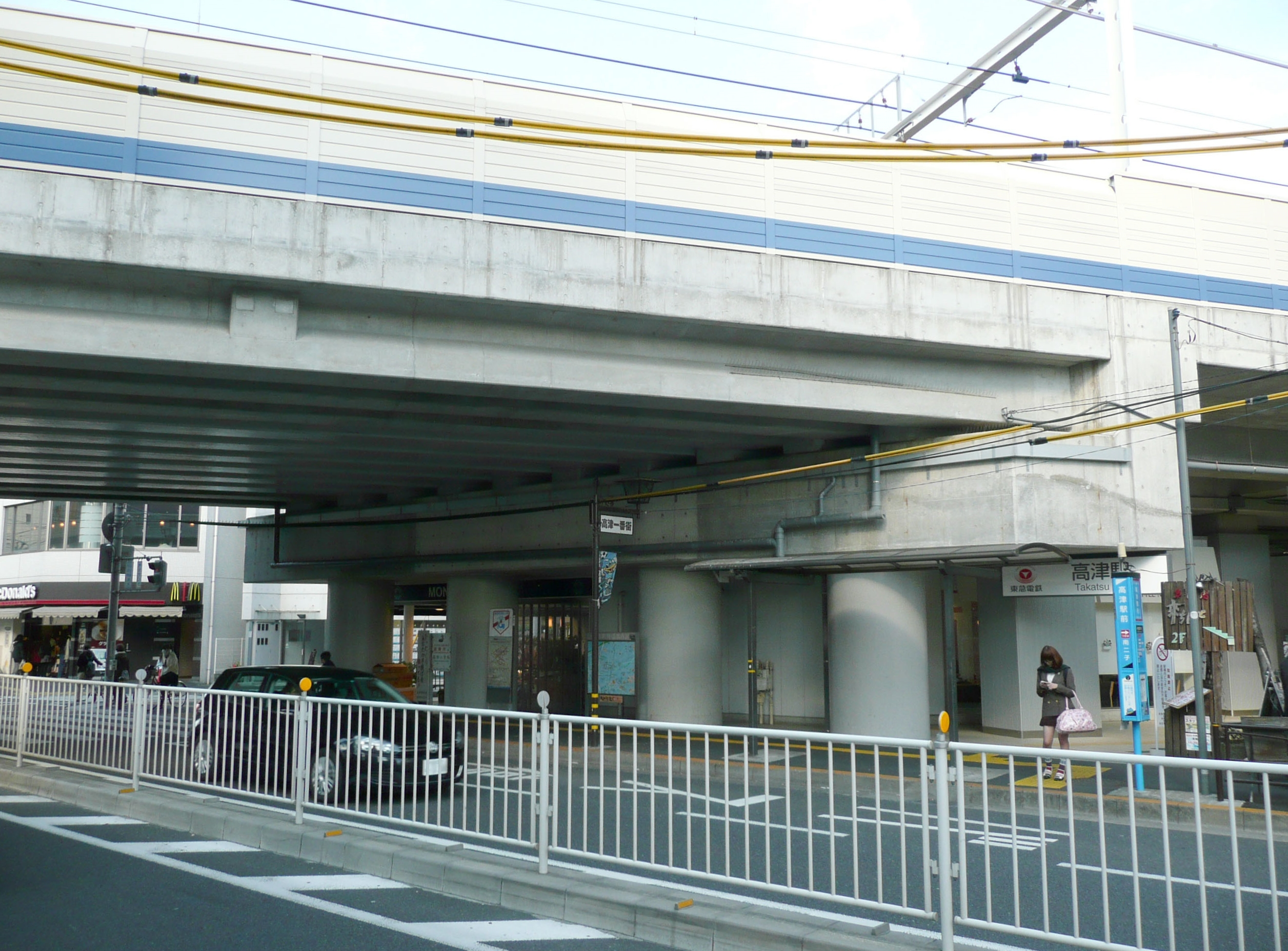
The west entrance in November 2011

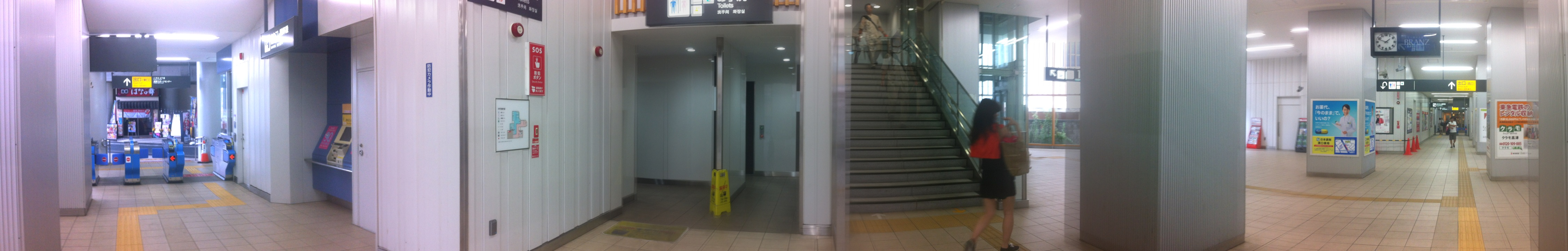
Panorama of both exit gates from inside the station, August 2014

== History ==
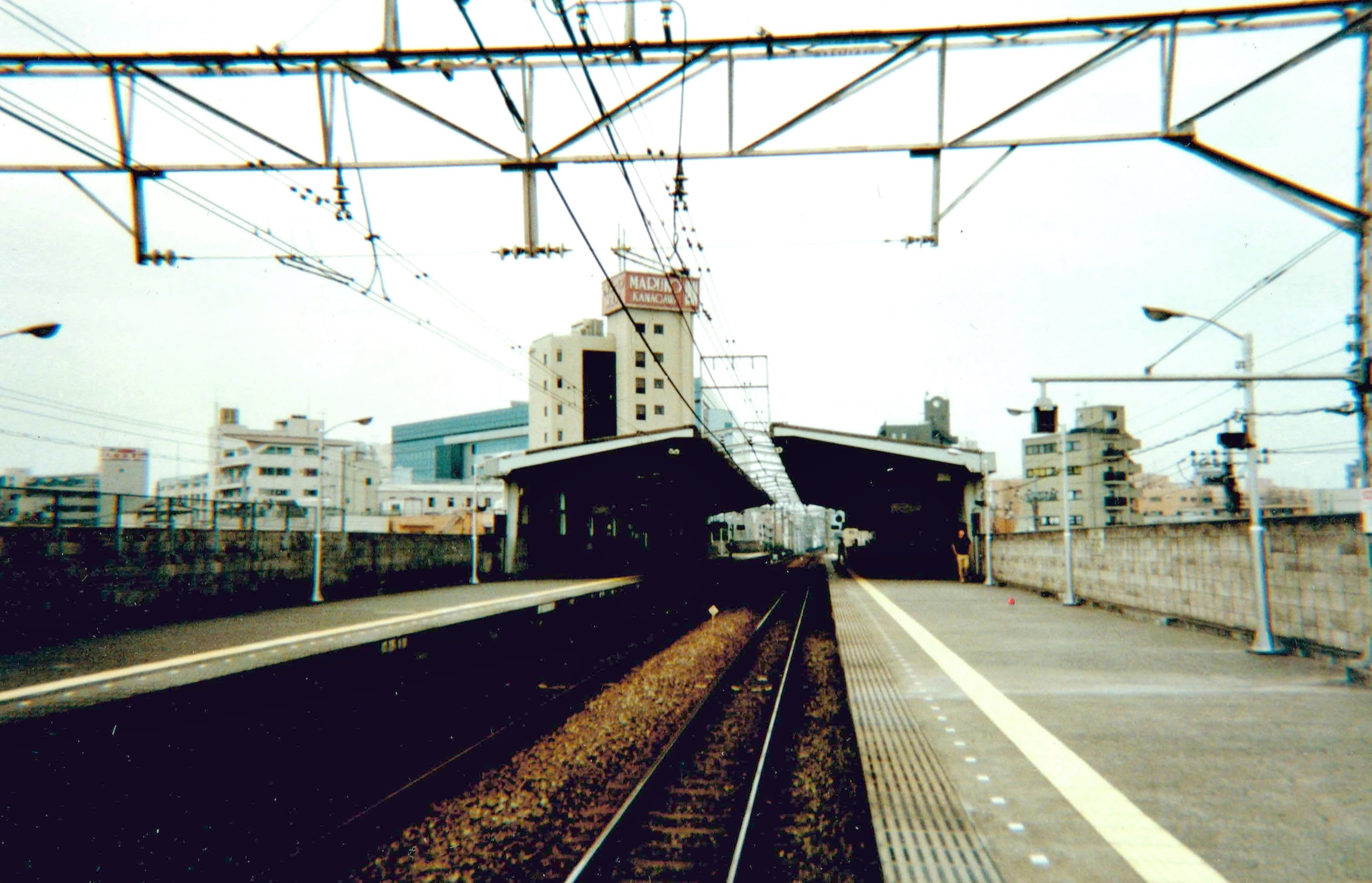
The station platforms in 2000, before remodeling

Takatsu Station opened on July 15, 1927, as a station on the Tamagawa Electric Railway (玉川電気鉄道, Tamagawa Denski Tetsudo). It became a station on the Ōimachi Line from July 1, 1943. In 1966, the station was rebuilt as an elevated station with the opening of the Tokyu Den-en-toshi Line. Between 2007 and 2009, the platforms were rebuilt for the expansion of Ōimachi Line.

== Passenger statistics ==
In fiscal 2019, the station was used by an average of 32,388 passengers daily.

The passenger figures for previous years are as shown below.

Fiscal year	daily average
2005	25,802
2010	28,429
2015	31,256

== Surrounding area ==
- Teikyo University Mizoguchi Hospital
- Japan National Route 409
- Kawasaki City Takatsu Library
- Kawasaki City Takatsu Elementary School

== See also ==
- List of railway stations in Japan
