= Jodo Shinshu Hongwanji-ha =

Sub-sect of Jōdo-Shinshū

Jodo Shinshu Hongwanji-ha (the period Japanese transcription), or more commonly Jodo Shinshu Honganji-ha (the contemporary Japanese transcription, 浄土真宗本願寺派, Jōdo Shinshū Honganji-ha), is a Japanese Buddhist organization. It is a sub-sect within Jodo Shinshu. Its head temple is Nishi Hongan-ji. It is the largest Jodo Shinshu sub-sect, the second largest being Otani-ha.

Hongwanji-ha declared itself against the Iraq War. It has millions of members.
