= Nordisk Kemiteknolog Konferens =

The Nordisk Kemiteknolog Konferens (English: Conference for Nordic Students of Applied Chemistry) is a conference with the goal of letting students of applied chemistry collaborate with colleagues in the Nordic countries.

NKK was first thought of and put to action more than thirty years ago, in the 1970s. The aim of the conferences was to let students of applied chemistry meet their colleagues from Sweden, Finland, Denmark and Norway. The original universities involved in the project were those of KTH (Stockholm), Uppsala, Chalmers (Gothenburg), Aalto (TKK) (Helsinki), Turku, DTU (Copenhagen), NTH (Trondheim), Luleå, Umeå and Linköping. During the conferences, which are summoned once a year in one of the above-mentioned cities according to an established system of circulation, the host city is to present industry typical for its region. The original language of the conference was Swedish, but with the addition of the technical university of Tallinn from Estonia in 2006, the official language of the conference is now English.

The NKK has evolved into an annual happening in which about 50 privileged students of applied chemistry, usually the most active ones of their student organisations and members of their boards, come together to get acquainted with each other, visit companies of their own future trade, have parties together and discussions of what topics might be of current interest at the time being. The participants have usually been able to take part in NKK free of charge, thanks to the companies sponsoring NKK. It has been a relationship of mutual benefit for the NKK organisation and the sponsoring companies; the companies have got a lot of positive publicity amongst a group of future professionals in their own trade, and moreover, as the participants usually are in quite prominent positions in their respective organisations, the knowledge of the participating companies usually have a good spreading around the Nordic countries.

There are several NKK traditions, where one of them is to have a salmiakki conference.

== List of host universities ==
- Tallinn University of Technology, 2012, 2017
- Åbo Akademi, 1994, 1999, 2002, 2003, 2016
- Lund University, 1993, 2008, 2015, 2023
- Norwegian University of Science and Technology, 1980, 1988, 2014, 2024
- Aalto University, 2013, 2025
- Technical University of Denmark, 2000, 2007, 2011, 2018
- Chalmers University of Technology, 2009
- Helsinki University of Technology, 2006
- Royal Institute of Technology, 2005
- Uppsala University, 2001
