= Jiuchi =

Underlying rhythm in traditional Japanese music

Jiuchi (地打ち), commonly referred to as "ji," is the base beat or underlying rhythm in traditional Japanese music. In the folk tradition, it consists of a simple, even rhythm, sung using kuchi shoka as "do ko do ko." This is often called "straight ji" in English to differentiate from other ji patterns.

A common variation is to "swing" the ji, called the "dongo" pattern after the kuchi shoka (sung as "don go don go"). When playing dongo, the upbeat (the "go") is not evenly spaced between the downbeats, but is instead played toward the "back of the beat," a common practice in jazz music. Generally the first note of each pair is twice as long as the second, giving the pattern a triplet feel. In English, the dongo pattern is often simply called the swing ji because of the history of the swing rhythm in North American jazz. Other common types of ji include the horse-beat ji ("don dogo don dogo"; in Western drum notation:"1.&a2.&a3.&a4.&a") and the matsuri, or festival, ji ("DON doko don DON, DON doko don DON").

The ji is usually played throughout a song to hold the other instruments together rhythmically. For this reason, the ji is prevalent when playing taiko, which is a Japanese art form in which the drums are the central instrument. When playing taiko, the ji is often simple and loud, played most often on a smaller rope-tied drum (the "shime-daiko") which is high-pitched and has a sharp attack, making it easily audible over the rumble of the larger taikos. It can by played on almost any instrument, however. For example, it is commonly played on the largest drum (the "ōdaiko"), either as backing for the other instruments, or to aid a soloist playing on the other head of the drum.
