= Taiko: Drum Master =

2004 video game

- PS2 US front cover
- Developer: Namco
- Publishers: NA: Namco Hometek; JP: Namco
- Series: Taiko no Tatsujin
- Platform: PlayStation 2
- Release: PlayStation 2: NA: October 26, 2004; JP: March 17, 2005
- Genre: Rhythm
- Modes: Single-player, multiplayer

Taiko: Drum Master, also known as Taiko no Tatsujin: Taiko Drum Master (太鼓の達人 TAIKO DRUM MASTER) in Japan, is a 2004 rhythm game developed and published by Namco for the Sony PlayStation 2 as part of the popular Japanese video game franchise Taiko no Tatsujin. It was released in North America in 2004, and Japan in 2005.

The game was notable for being the only Taiko no Tatsujin title to release in North America, until the releases of Taiko no Tatsujin: Drum 'n' Fun! and Taiko no Tatsujin: Drum Session! in 2018. The songs featured in Taiko: Drum Master were all in English and mostly taken from various Western artists, even in the Japanese release.

== Gameplay ==
Notes that move horizontally along a timeline show what to hit and when; a red note indicates hitting the center of the drum, while a blue note indicates hitting the rim. A drum simulating the taiko is played in time with music.

Successful play builds up a "spirit gauge", which indicates how many notes have been hit. If the meter is past a certain point by the end of the song, the song is passed.

In the Japanese version, subtitles under the symbols give the pronunciation of the sounds (e.g. "do don do don") using a traditional system called kuchi shoga (口唱歌).

Despite the game's appearance, players may find the game challenging to master. Players need to accomplish at least a 65% clearance of a song, which is determined by the spirit gauge, to pass, and songs can become challenging on harder difficulties as players progress.

== North American release track listing ==
=== Pop and rock ===
1. "ABC" by The Jackson Five
2. "American Girls" - by Counting Crows
3. "Are You Gonna Be My Girl" - by Jet
4. "Girls and Boys" - by Good Charlotte
5. "I'm a Believer" - cover version, original by The Monkees
6. "Killer Queen" - by Queen
7. "Lady Marmalade" - by Labelle
8. "Love Shack" - by The B-52s
9. "Material Girl" - by Madonna
10. "My Sharona" - by The Knack
11. "Slide" - by The Goo Goo Dolls
12. "That's the Way (I Like It)" - by KC and the Sunshine Band
13. "The Impression That I Get" - by The Mighty Mighty Bosstones
14. "Toxic" - by Britney Spears
15. "Tubthumping" - by Chumbawamba
16. "Walking on Sunshine" - by Katrina and the Waves

=== Anime/TV ===
1. "Dragon Ball Z Theme" (Rock the Dragon) - by Shuki Levy
2. "Jimmy Neutron Theme" - by Bowling for Soup

=== Classical ===
1. "Beethoven's Symphony No. 5" (Beethoven)
2. "Carmen Prelude" (Bizet)
3. "Foster's Medley" (a medley of songs by Foster including "Oh! Susannah", "Kentucky Home", and "Camptown Races")
4. "Hungarian Dances No. 5" (Brahms)
5. "Symphony No. 25 in G Minor" (Mozart)
6. "William Tell Overture" (Rossini)

=== NAMCO Original ===
- "Don Rangers" (heard in a small portion from a cutscene in Katamari Damacy) (10 cleared songs to unlock)
- "Brave Sword, Braver Soul" (from the arcade fighting game Soulcalibur II)
- "Dragon Spirit" (medley of music from the Namco arcade game of the same name)
- "Katamari on the Rocks" (theme song from the PlayStation 2 game Katamari Damacy)
- "Ridge Racer" (from the Namco racing game of the same name) (15 cleared songs to unlock)
- "Taiko March" (combination of several songs from Namco titles including Sky Kid, The Tower of Druaga, and The Legend of Valkyrie) (5 cleared songs to unlock)
- "The Genji and the Heike Clans" (from the Japanese arcade game Genpei Tōma Den) (20 cleared songs to unlock)

== Japanese release track listing ==
=== Pop ===
- "I'm a Slave 4 U" - Britney Spears
- "I Was Born To Love You" - Queen
- "American Girls" - Counting Crows
- "We Will Rock You" - Queen
- "ABC" - Jackson 5
- "Girls and Boys" - by Good Charlotte
- "Killer Queen" - Queen
- "The Impression That I Get" - The Mighty Mighty Bosstones
- "That's The Way (I Like It)" - KC & The Sunshine Band
- "The Loco-Motion" - Carole King
- "Slide"
- "September" - Earth, Wind, & Fire
- "Tubthumping" - by Chumbawamba
- "Material Girl" - Madonna
- "You Can't Hurry Love"
- "Love Shack" - by The B-52s
- "Lady Marmalade" - by Labelle
- "Walking on Sunshine" - by Katrina and the Waves

=== Children's song ===
- Alphabet Song

=== Classical ===
1. "Beethoven's Symphony No. 5" (Beethoven)
2. "Carmen Prelude" (Bizet)
3. "Foster's Medley" (a medley of songs by Foster including "Oh! Susannah", "Kentucky Home", and "Camptown Races")
4. "Hungarian Dances No. 5" (Brahms)
5. "Symphony No. 25 in G Minor" (Mozart)
6. "William Tell Overture" (Rossini)

=== NAMCO Original ===
- Brave Sword, Braver Soul
- The Genji and the Heike Clans
- Ridge Racer
- Taiko March
- Mojipittan Medley (a medley of songs from the Namco game of the same name)
- Dragon Spirit
- Saitama 2000

== Bonus ==
- The bundle with the game comes with a Taiko controller with plastic drumsticks where players plug into the PS2 console.
- The Oni (Extreme) difficulty is unlocked by clearing 25 songs.

== Reception ==
Reception

Aggregate scores
Aggregator	Score	
Aggregator	mobile	PS2
GameRankings	75%	78%
Metacritic	N/A	77/100

Review scores
Publication	Score	
Publication	mobile	PS2
1Up.com	N/A	B+
Game Informer	N/A	7.75/10
GameRevolution	N/A	C+
GameSpot	7.1/10	7.3/10
GameSpy	N/A	4.5/5
GameZone	N/A	9/10
IGN	7.4/10	7.7/10
Official U.S. PlayStation Magazine	N/A	4/5
PlayStation: The Official Magazine	N/A	7/10
X-Play	N/A	4/5
Detroit Free Press	N/A	3/4
The New York Times	N/A	(average)

The PlayStation 2 version of Taiko: Drum Master received "generally favorable reviews" according to the review aggregation website Metacritic.

== See also ==
- Taiko no Tatsujin
