= Seidō Kobayashi =

- Born: Seidō Kobayashi; 1944 (age 81–82); Tokyo, Japan
- Genre: Taiko
- Occupation: Taiko performer
- Years active: 1959–present
- Website: oedosukerokutaiko.com

Seidō Kobayashi (小林正道, Kobayashi Seidō) is the founder and current leader of the Tokyo-based taiko group, Oedo Sukeroku Taiko. Under Kobayashi's leadership, his taiko group, founded in 1959, was the first to tour professionally. He is considered a master performer of taiko. Kobayashi was well known for attempting to assert intellectual control of the group's performance style, which many believe has influenced taiko performance among many groups, particularly in North America.

== Early performance work ==
Kobayashi was born in Hongō, Tokyo in 1944. In his youth, Kobayashi regularly performed competitive drumming at Bon festivals in Tokyo, in part to impress the large crowds which included many young women. Kobayashi would consistently place in the top five performers, sometimes even placing first. Kobayashi later joined a drumming group for Bon festivals called Oedo Sukeroku Kai, which was headed by his older brother, Seikō Kobayashi. After some performances where Kobayashi reportedly enjoyed "showing off" on stage, he formed a taiko group formed which would eventually become Oedo Sukeroku Daiko. Coincidentally, some of the other top performers in those same Bon competitions were later to join Kobayashi in Oedo Sukeroku Kai, and thereafter, under his leadership, in Oedo Sukeroku Daiko.

== Oedo Sukeroku Taiko ==
Kobayashi founded Oedo Sukeroku Taiko in 1959 out of the Yushima Tenjin Shrine in the Bunkyō Ward in Tokyo. Among taiko groups in Japan, it is one of the most recognized, and Kobayashi's leadership and skill is considered masterful. He developed what is known as the Sukeroku style of taiko performance, which includes the use of slanted taiko stands, and certain movements along a diagonal plane to the drum.

During the 1990s, Kobayashi made a statement to the North American taiko community based on the intellectual property related to Sukeroku style performance. At the time, use of another group repertoire was generally taken care of informally between groups. For instance, if a group wanted to learn a new piece from a recording or from a student from another group, permission was obtained usually by simply asking the leadership of the relevant group. However, in 1999, Kobayashi sent a letter to his former student Seiichi Tanaka, leader of the San Francisco Taiko Dojo, and asked him to present it to the 1999 Taiko Conference in Los Angeles. This letter requested that all groups playing Oedo Sukeroku Daiko's pieces to cease performing them altogether if they had not received permission from Kobayashi. Many North American taiko groups borrowed the repertoire from the group, and as such, the message came as a shock to the community. This response prompted a second letter from Kobayashi, who stated specifically that groups who wanted to use their repertoire (which he termed Dageikyoku (多芸曲)) would need to be trained either by Kobayashi in Tokyo, or by Tanaka in San Francisco. As many groups could not afford the fees associated with the required training, and due to disagreement whether Kobayashi was justified in his demands, many groups did not comply, and Kobayashi gave up on his demands.
