= Tsuri-daiko =

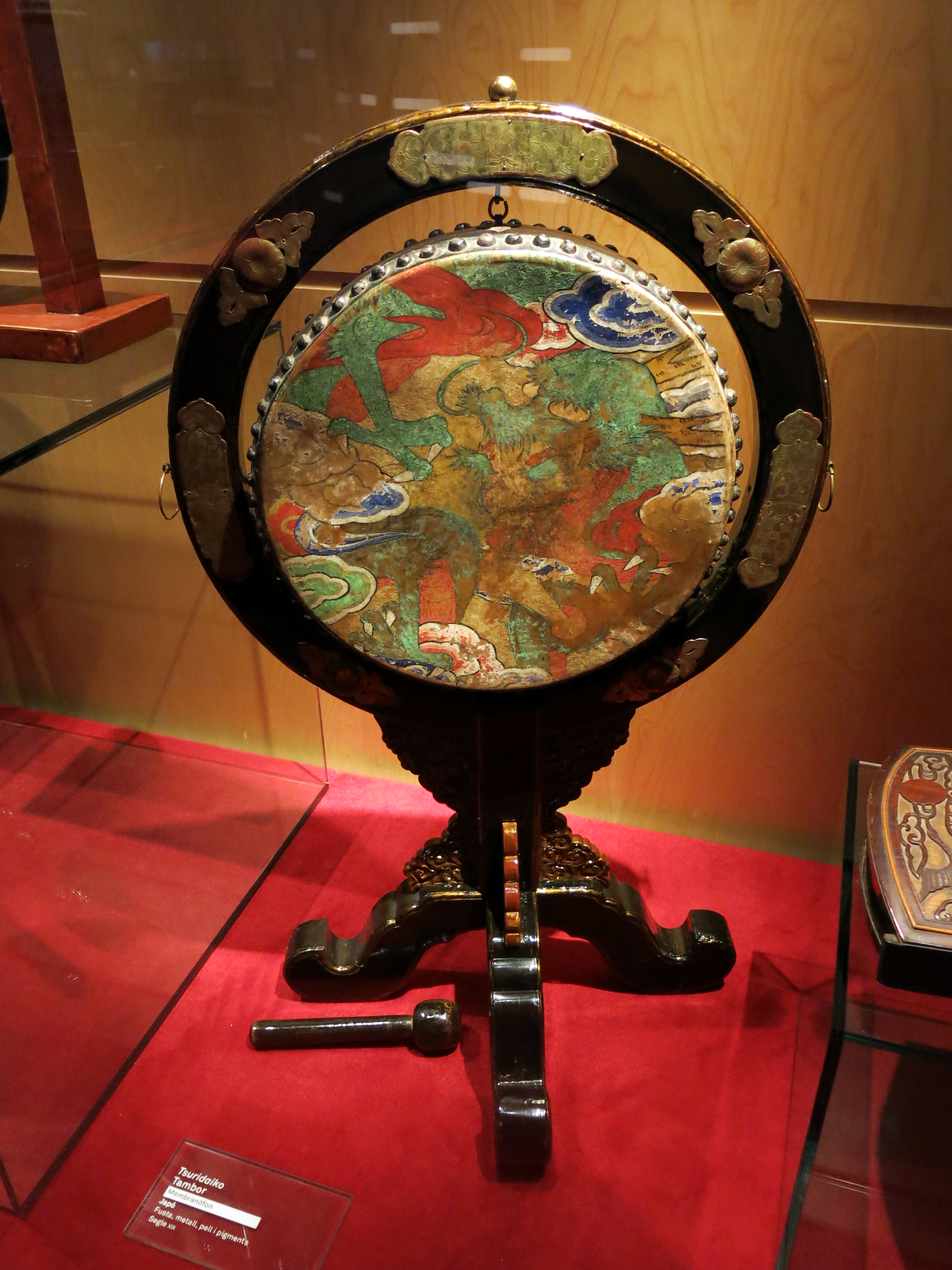
A tsuri-daiko on display at the Museu de la Música de Barcelona

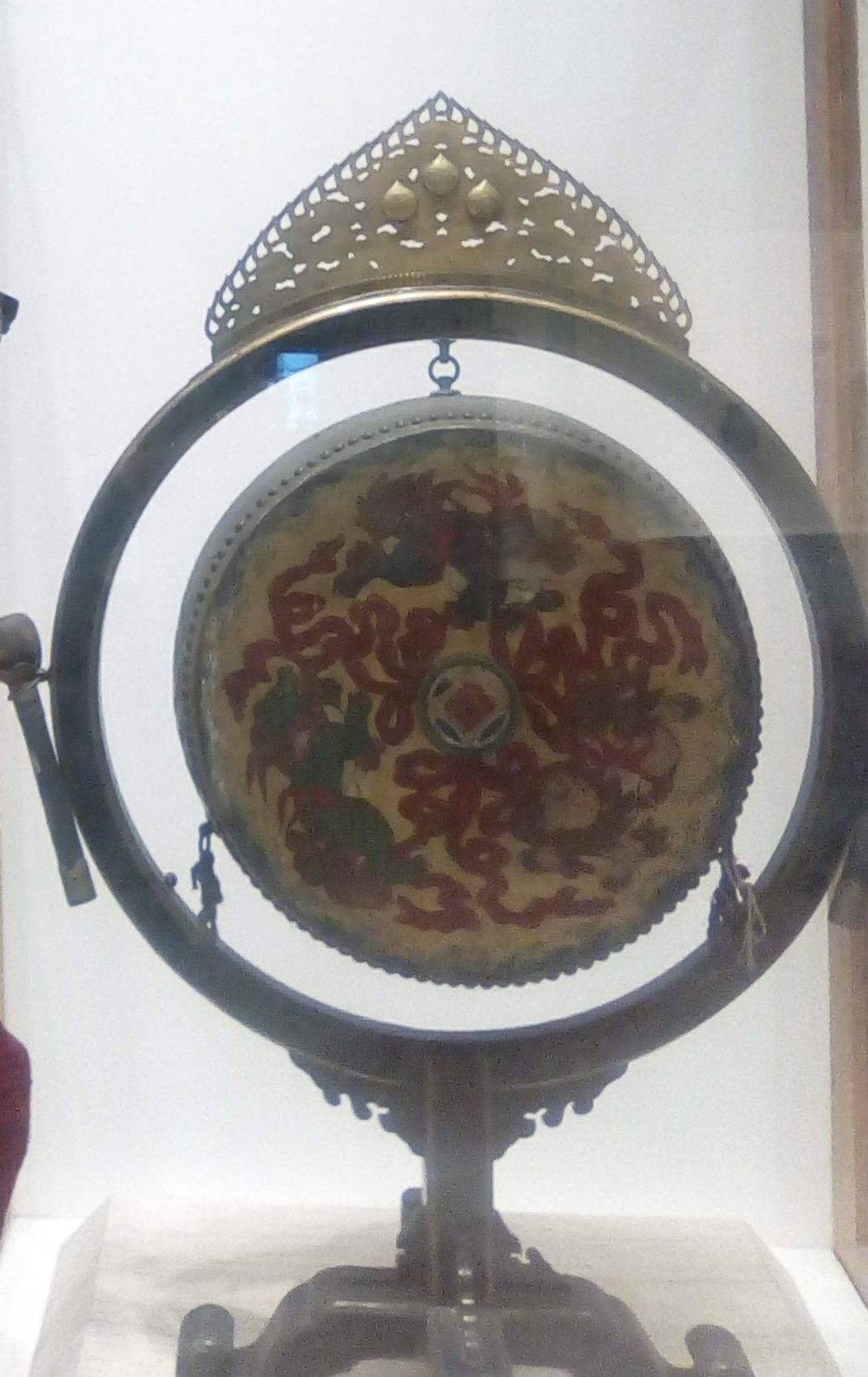
A Tsuri-daiko on display at the Indian Museum, Kolkata.

The tsuri-daiko (kanji: 釣り太鼓; also called gaku-daiko (kanji: 楽太鼓)) is a large Japanese hanging drum. It is played with two mallets on one side only. It is used primarily in bugaku orchestra.

The tsuri-daiko is a type of Japanese hanging drum suspended within a wooden frame and played with two mallets. Its performance technique comprises two main strokes: the heavy stroke played with the right hand, called "do", and the light stroke played with the left hand, called "zoh'un".
