= Bachi =

Stick used with certain musical instruments

Bachi (桴, 枹; also batchi) are straight wooden sticks used on Japanese taiko drums, and also the plectrum (written 撥) for stringed instruments of Japanese origin such as the shamisen and biwa.

== For percussion ==
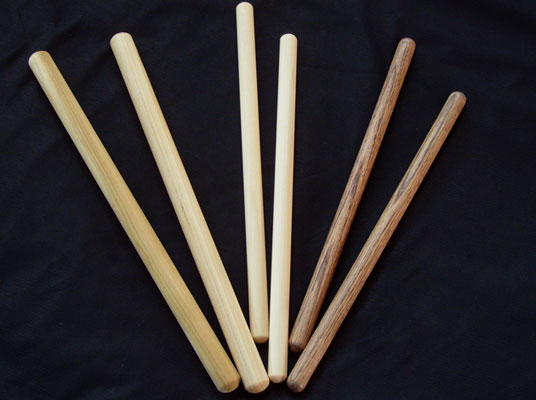
Bachi for taiko drums

Drum bachi (桴, 枹) are made in a wide variety of sizes and materials, as appropriate to the drum it will be used to play. A typical bachi is about 22 mm (7/8 inches) in diameter, 400 mm (16 inches) long and made out of a hardwood such as oak. These would be suitable for a wide variety of playing styles.

A bachi for playing a larger drum like the O-daiko would be bigger both in circumference and length. Similarly, smaller bachi are used for smaller drums.

Distinctions between the characters 桴 and 枹 are not always made in technical terms, but 枹 can also literally refer to the white oak tree, or Quercus. Some other woods commonly used to make bachi are (Japanese names in parentheses): maple (楓, kaede), pine (松, matsu), cypress (檜, hinoki), magnolia (朴, hō), beech (椈, buna) and bamboo (竹, take). Magnolia is one of the lightest and softest woods, most suitable for playing smaller drums with a sharp attack and less decay. On a larger drum, however, a magnolia bachi usually sounds "slappy" and flat, because it is too light to strike the thicker head of the drum with enough power to generate the lower tones of the drum. It is also too soft to strike the rim of the drum (in kuchi shoka, it is called a ka) without denting the wood. Cypress is slightly harder than magnolia, and is usually cheaper as well. On the opposite extreme, an evergreen oak (樫, kashi) bachi is heavy and hard. It brings out a better, fuller sound when playing larger taiko, but it muffles the higher harmonics of smaller taiko, sounding "thunky" and dead.

Taiko drumming is a highly visual art form, and so bachi are sometimes decorated with bells or tassels for use during performance.

== For stringed instruments ==
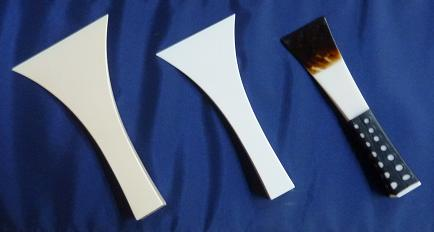
Bachi for string instruments

Bachi used for stringed instruments (撥) are actually picks. They are very distinct in form and use from Western-style picks, which are usually smaller in order to be held between or mounted to fingers. In shape, bachi are similar to an ice scraper or a putty knife.

Bachi can be made of various materials and with varying levels of strength. Similarly to guitar picks, bachi were traditionally made of tortoise shell (鼈甲, bekkō) or ivory (象牙, zōge), but these materials are rare and expensive (and illegal to trade in some territories, due to protection of endangered species), therefore making bachi in these materials highly expensive and impractical. Modern and more affordable variants are often made of acrylic, plastic or wood.

Generally, bachi made of softer, more flexible materials are easier to play with for beginners, but harder materials produce a stronger sound and last longer.
