= Shime-daiko =

Musical instrument

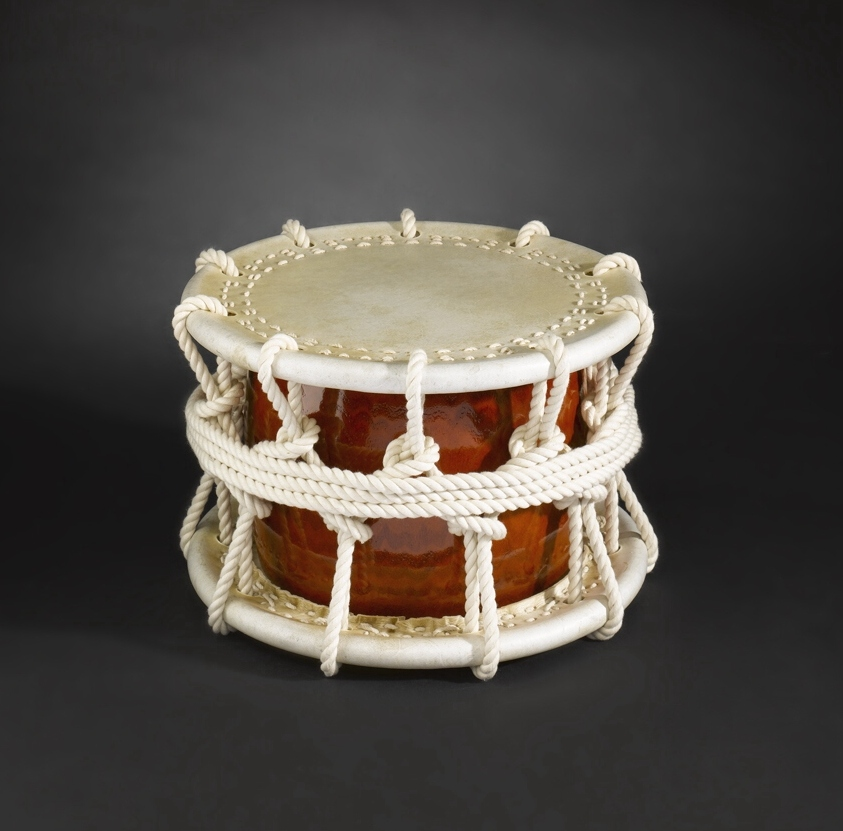

Shime-daiko (center) being performed to accompany a kagura performance, 2024

The shime-daiko (締め太鼓) is a small Japanese drum. It has a short but wide body with animal skin drumheads on both its upper and bottom sides. The hide is first stretched on metal hoops, then stretched over the body. Similar to the tsuzumi and to African talking drums, both drum heads are bound together with cords so that the drum heads are bound by each other. Like the larger taiko drums, the shime-daiko is played with sticks called "bachi", while it is suspended on a stand. Being very taut, the shime-daiko has a higher pitch than that of normal taiko. Shime-daiko are used in various Japanese music ensembles, from nagauta, hayashi, taiko, to folk music, or min'yō ensembles.

Shime-daiko have been used in Japanese music genres since the dengaku of the Middle Ages.

== Etymology ==
The word "shime-daiko" comes from a larger word "tsukeshime-daiko" (付締め太鼓) often shortened to simply, "shime-daiko" or "shime". The prefix "tsukeshime" (付締め) incorporates the verbs tsukeru (付ける, "to fasten; to attach"), and shimeru (締める, "to fasten; to tie"); the compound connotes a tight, secure fastening.
