= Oedo Sukeroku Taiko =

- Official 2013 T-shirt Logo for Oedo Sukeroku Taiko

Background information
- Also known as: Oedo Sukeroku Daiko
- Origin: Tokyo, Japan
- Genre: Taiko
- Years active: 1959-present
- Label: Playasound
- Website: oedosukerokutaiko.com

Oedo Sukeroku Taiko (大江戸助六太鼓, Ōedo Sukeroku Daiko) is a taiko group from Japan. It is considered the first taiko group to begin touring professionally and, sometimes, the first professional taiko group. The group formed in Tokyo in 1959, and is one of the oldest recognized taiko groups in Japan. Oedo Sukeroku Taiko has an eponymous style of performance, typically called Sukeroku style. They are also credited with popularizing taiko performance in North America.

== Name ==
The name of the group comes from the former name for Tokyo, Edo, and a main character named Sukeroku Hanakawado in a kabuki play called Sukeroku Yukari no Edo Zakura. Sukeroku is a hero in the play, and is thought to represent the traditional spirit of Edo.

== History ==
In 1959, Oedo Sukeroku Taiko formed in the Bunkyo ward in Tokyo under Seidō Kobayashi and three other men, using the Yushima Tenjin Shrine as a practice space. The initial group included three others including Kobayashi: Onozato Motoe, Ishizuka Yutaka, and Ishikura Yoshihisa. One account of why Oedo Sukeroku Taiko started was that it emerged from a competitive atmosphere among young, male drum performers to stand out and impress young women at Bon festivals in the summertime, and in fact, Kobayashi and the other performers had previously been in a Bon performance group called Oedo Sukeroku Kai.

Some initial members of Oedo Sukeroku Taiko left to start independent groups; one of them was a similarly named group simply called Sukeroku Taiko founded by former player Imaizumi Yūtaka after a dispute with Kobayashi over money and the band's direction split them apart. However, Oedo Sukeroku Taiko continues to perform in national exhibitions in Japan as well as internationally in countries such as Belgium, Indonesia, and India. In the 1969, a student of the group, Seiichi Tanaka, founded a group in San Francisco called the San Francisco Taiko Dojo, and also teaches Sukeroku-style performance.

In 1999, Kobayashi accused taiko groups in North America of performing pieces owned by Oedo Sukeroku Taiko, using their style and equipment, without permission, acknowledgment, or compensation for their intellectual property. In two letters, Kobayashi demanded that groups or individuals either study under their group in Japan or with the San Francisco Taiko Dojo to obtain permission. These demands were, however, largely ignored by the North American community, no compensation was given, and the group abandoned their requests.

== Impact ==
Oedo Sukeroku Taiko is thought to have had the greatest influence in the development and styles of North American taiko groups. One commentator noted, "It would not be a far reach to say that most groups in North America owe a stylistic debt to Oedo Sukeroku." Their style of playing and repertoire are considered a standard in the Americas, and perhaps because of its prevalence, the group is not often credited for developing this style.

== Sukeroku performance style ==
The performance style specific to Oedo Sukeroku Taiko, sometimes called Sukeroku style, is characterized by a number of factors. First, chū-daiko drums are positioned on a diagonal stand in a slanted fashion. Second, players take on a specific position with their left leg bent, and their right leg fully extended, and the drum is approximately at the performer's waist level. Their style also blends certain kata from traditions such as budō and classical music elements from a tradition called hogaku.
