= Ice scraper =

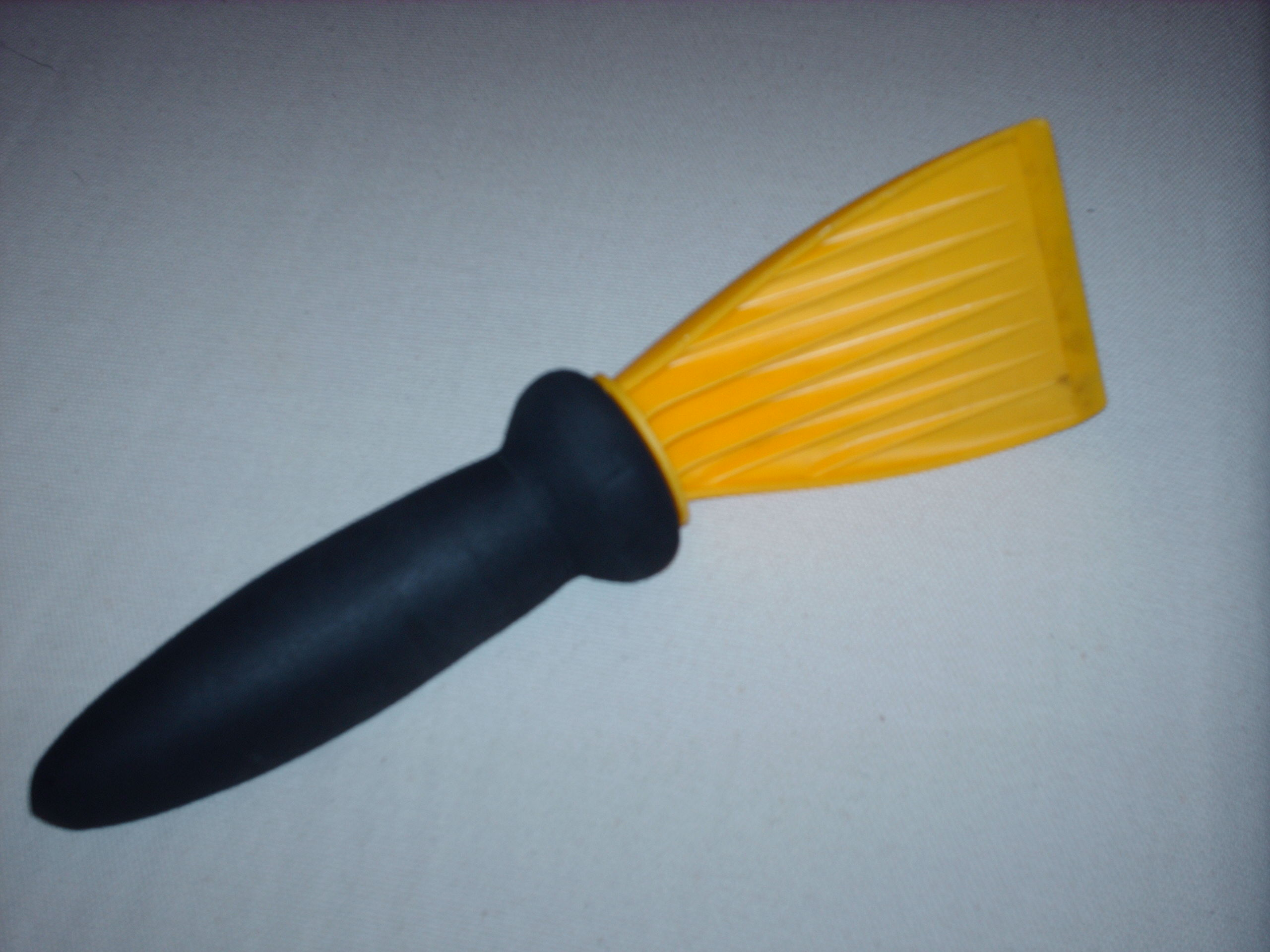
Ice scraper

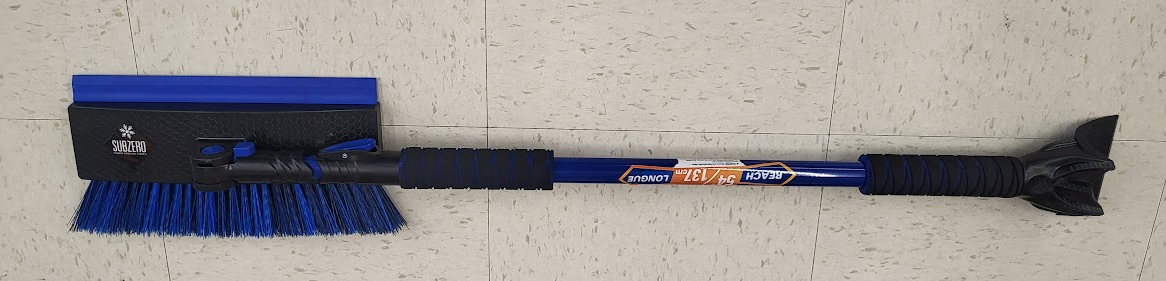
A multi-function ice scraper with snow brush, water squeegee, and telescoping handle.

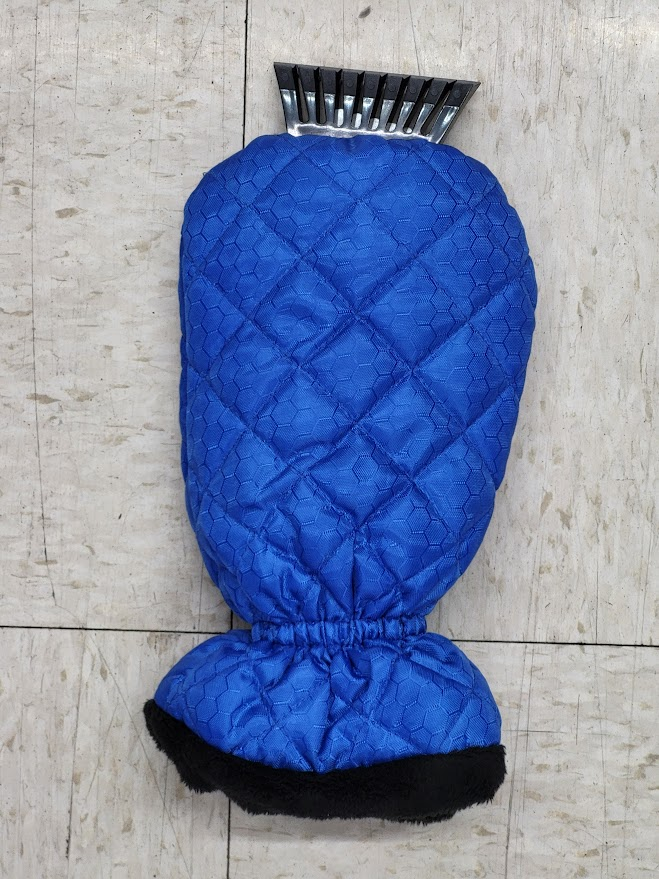
An ice scraper mitten.

An ice scraper is a handheld tool for removing frost, ice, and snow from windows, usually on automobiles. Basic scrapers have a plastic blade and handle, though some have blades made out of metal. More complex models often include brushes to help remove collected snow, or squeegees to remove water if the ambient temperature is near the melting point. Alternatively, the handle can be inside a thumbless mitten to help keep the user's hands warm and dry when using the scraper.

The blade of an ice scraper is usually flat if it is made out of metal, though some varieties include ridges that can be helpful if it is necessary to break up a sheet of ice (such as what collects in freezing rain). Plastic blades tend to have a more complex shape with several thick "fingers" linked together. This form helps the blade to flex, since most modern car windows have a slight curvature. The "fingers" also often have ridges on top, so the scraper can be flipped over to break up thick ice. More complex designs exist to improve ice clearance on curved glass on automobiles.
