= Seiichi Tanaka =

Japanese-American taiko musician and teacher

- 田中 誠一
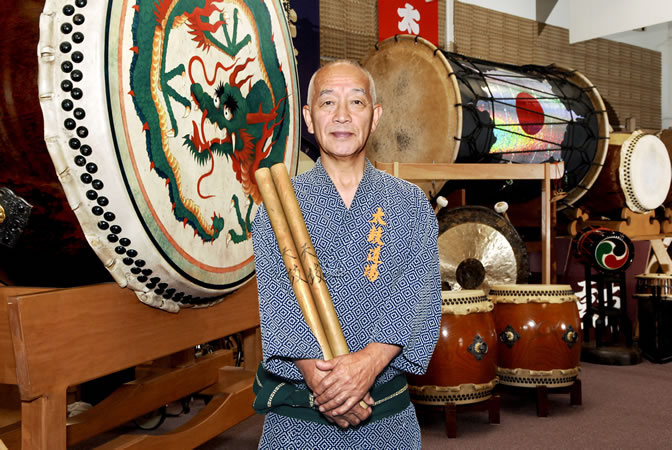
- Tanaka in 2001
- Born: 1943 (age 82–83); Tokyo, Japan
- Years active: 1968–present
- Known for: Taiko

Seiichi Tanaka (田中 誠一, Tanaka Seiichi) is the first Japan-trained teacher of kumidaiko, or taiko, in the United States and is largely regarded as the father of the art form in North America.

== Early life ==
Tanaka was born in Tokyo, Japan in 1943 and immigrated to the United States in 1967. He returned to Japan to study the art of kumidaiko with Daihachi Oguchi in Nagano prefecture, Japan, with Susumu Kowase of Oedo Sukeroku Taiko in Tokyo, and Shosaku Ikeda, of Gojinjo Daiko.

== Career ==
In 1968, he founded the San Francisco Taiko Dojo, which was the first North American taiko ensemble.

Tanaka and San Francisco Taiko Dojo host an annual International Taiko Festival at Zellerbach Hall on the campus of the University of California, Berkeley. His performance credits include work on the soundtrack for The Right Stuff and an appearance playing his signature piece, "Tsunami", in the film Rising Sun.

In April 2005, Tanaka and San Francisco Taiko Dojo were the subjects of a segment that aired on KQED public television.

He is a recipient of a 2001 National Heritage Fellowship awarded by the National Endowment for the Arts, which is the United States' highest honor in the folk and traditional arts.

Tanaka's former students, Kenny Endo, Russel Baba, Jeanne Mercer, and Tiffany Tamaribuchi, are prominent taiko performers, leaders of their own groups, and teachers of kumidaiko in North America, prompting him to remark, when receiving the NEA Award in year 2001, that he "should be known as the grandfather of taiko".
