= Kuchi shōga =

System of notation for traditional Japanese drums

Kuchi shōga (口唱歌), also known as kuchi showa or kuchi shoka, is an educational musical notation for traditional Japanese drums, particularly the taiko and the tsuzumi. Kuchi shōga phoneticizes (that is, phonetically articulates) drum strokes using Japanese sound symbolism. Each syllable conveys information about how the drummer is to play a particular note.

Kuchi shōga notation is written in katakana, a syllabary familiar to all literate Japanese language speakers. Kuchi shōga can be transliterated from katakana to a Latin alphabet using one of the various systems of rōmaji.

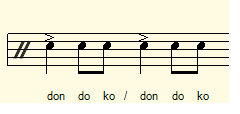
Notation for the yūkichi rhythm found in a form of taiko performance called Hachijo-daiko. Accented notes and verbal notation (called kuchi-shoga) indicated.

== Common phoneticizations ==
Although kuchi shōga does not have a fixed vocabulary, some phoneticizations are ubiquitous. Don typically means a deep, sustained sound from the center of the taiko. Do sometimes represents a short beat that is not allowed to resonate (i.e., one with a short decay). Doko, dogo, or doro means two drum-beats played in rapid succession. Tsu represents a lightly struck note; tsuku implies two soft tsu beats in rapid succession—one on the right side of the drum, the other on the left. Ka means a sharp tap on the rim of the taiko, and kara describes alternate right and left taps.

Taiko players commonly phoneticize a right-handed bachi stroke with don, do, tsu, or ka, respectively; and a reserve kon, ko, ku, and ra for left-handed strokes.

Two syllables are reserved for strokes on the tsuzumi, a drum that is much smaller than the taiko: Ta describes a tap on the side of the drum; pon refers to a stroke on the center of the drumhead.

=== Rests ===
Rests are variously indicated with fricative syllables, such as sa and ho; or with semivowels, such as iya. A polysyllable, such as sore and dokkoi, indicates a two-beat rest.

This is called "kakegoe." If the rest is not sung, the space is often filled with unscripted sounds called kiais. Explicitly assigning words to represent the periods of silence in a song is likely linked to the Japanese concept of ma, where the space between notes is as important as the notes themselves in a performance.

== Sample notation ==
The following is an example of kuchi shōga notation transliterated in rōmaji:

Don (tsu) doko don, don (tsu) don kon, doko don (tsu) don

When played in common time, this sequence constitutes three measures: 1 . 3&4, 1 . 3 4, 1&2 . 4. The sticking, describing which hand the note is played with (R= Right, L=Left), is: R . RLR, R . R L, RLR . R

== See also ==
- Konnakol and bol (music), syllables used similarly in Indian music
- Canntaireachd, a similar system for traditional Scottish Highland piping (pibrochs)
- Music of Japan
- Onomatopoeia
- Percussion notation
- Shakuhachi musical notation
- Solmization
- Transcription (linguistics)
- Taiko
