= Bugaku =

Type of Japanese traditional dance

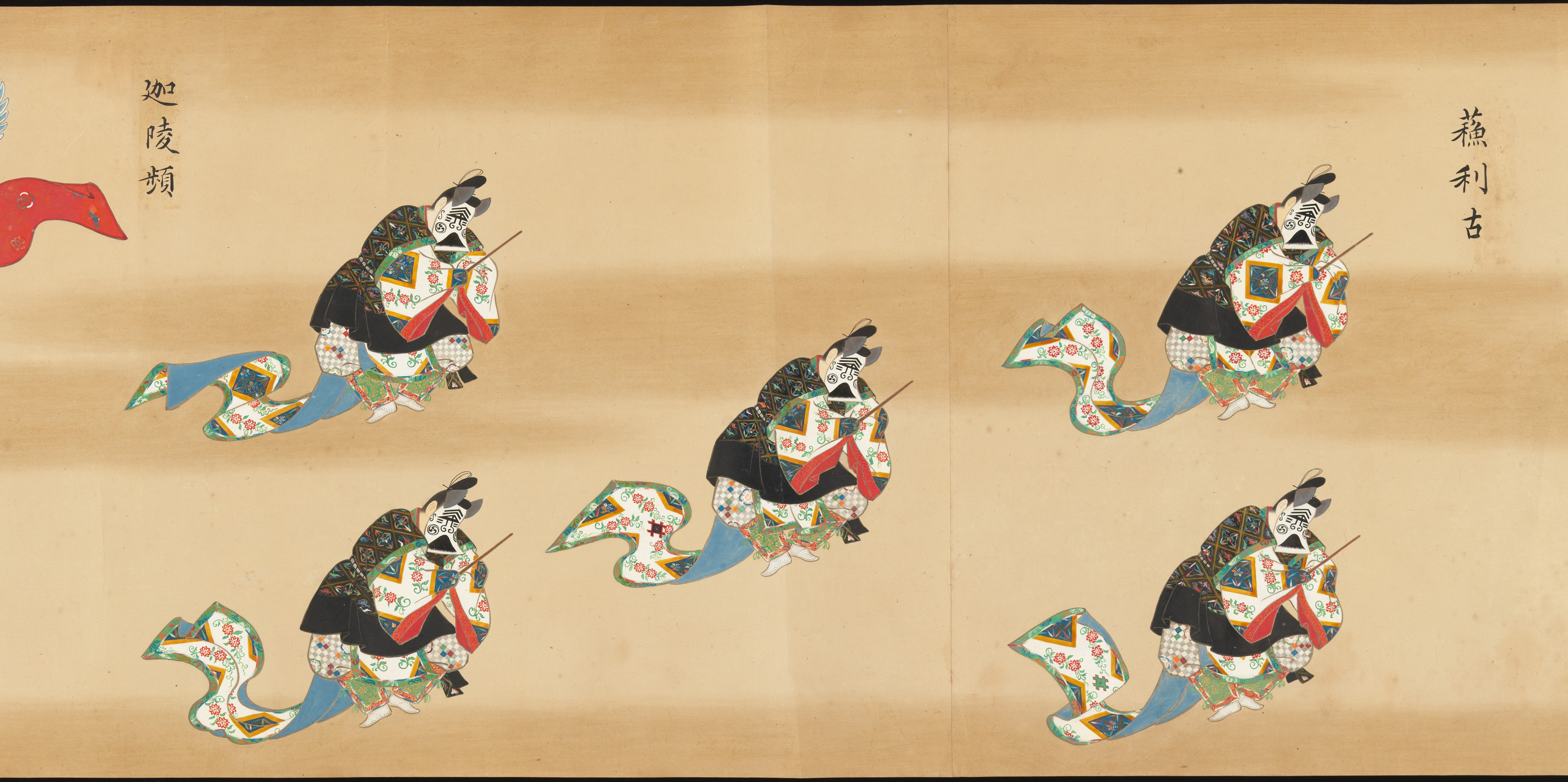
Bugaku Imperial Court Dance, 17th century, Metropolitan Museum of Art showing a dance called Soriko.

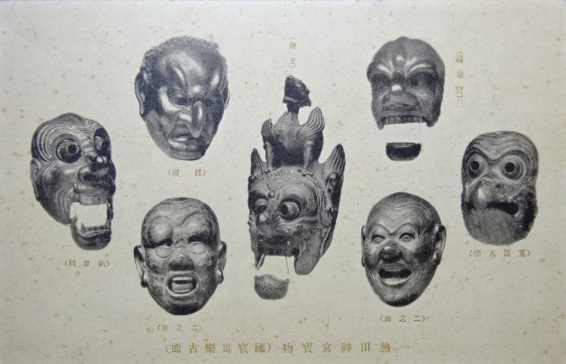
Some bugaku masks.

Bugaku (舞楽; court dance and music) is a Japanese traditional dance that has been performed to select elites, mostly in the Japanese imperial court, for over twelve hundred years. In this way, it has been known only to the nobility, although after World War II, the dance was opened to the public and has even toured around the world in 1959. The dance is marked by its slow, precise and regal movements. The dancers wear intricate traditional Buddhist costumes, which usually include equally beautiful masks. The music and dance pattern is often repeated several times. It is performed on a square platform, usually 6 yards by 6 yards.

Gerald Jonas, in his 2008 book Dancing: The pleasure power and art of movement explains that "some bugaku dances depict legendary battles, others enact encounters with divine personages or mythical beasts like the phoenix; one famous set-piece shows two dragons frolicking" (p. 102). He also discusses the ancient instruction manual that describes precisely the refined movements and postures that gagaku and bugaku performers must attain. Its descriptions often use natural metaphors to describe how their movement should be. For example, the dancers might be encouraged to be like a tree swaying in a cool breeze.

Amaterasu, the sun goddess had hidden herself in a cave because she was hurt by her brother Susano-o's unacceptable behaviour. Near the cave entrance, the goddess Ame-no-uzume, turned a tub over and started to dance on it in front of the worried assembly of gods. As Ame-no-uzume was half naked already, with clothes falling off, the gods started laughing loudly. When Amaterasu heard the commotion, she came out to see what was happening. Thus the world had sunlight again. The imperial family of Japan is said to have descended from Amaterasu and Ame-no-uzume is considered the patron goddess of music and dance.

This story comes from Japanese Shinto mythology. It could be said to be the start of dance as entertainment for the gods. As Japanese emperors were descended from Amaterasu, royalty and divinity often are closely associated. When Buddhist culture came over to Japan from Korea and China in the seventh century, it brought dance-drama traditions that involved intricate costumes and processions. Bugaku court dance draws heavily from the Buddhist imported culture, but also incorporates many traditional Shinto aspects. These influences eventually mixed together and over the years were refined into something uniquely Japanese, bugaku.

Gagaku is the court music that goes beside the bugaku court dance. Tadamaro Ono is a palace musician whose family has been performing for the emperors of Japan for almost twelve hundred years. This makes him the thirty ninth generation in an unbroken family line of gagaku court musicians. Musicians have to be thoroughly involved with focused minds and bodies so they are engaged in the same way the dancers are. The traditions of gagaku and bugaku are the oldest known surviving court dance and music in the world. Other court dances/musics, including the original influences on bugaku, have long since died out.

Some people note that Japanese culture is accommodating and expanding. So while accepting new culture, Japanese can continue these traditions into the modern day.
