= Yuru-kyara =

Mascot character

Yuru-kyara (Japanese: ゆるキャラ, Hepburn: yuru kyara) is a Japanese term for a category of mascot characters, usually created to promote a place or region, event, organisation or business. They are characterized by their kawaii (cute) and unsophisticated designs, often incorporating motifs that represent local culture, history or produce. They may be created by local government or other organizations to stimulate tourism and economic development, or created by a company to build on their corporate identity. They may appear as costumed characters (or kigurumi) at promotional events and festivals. Yuru-kyara has become a popular and lucrative business, with character-driven sales reaching nearly $16 billion in Japan in 2012.

Popular yuru-kyara include Kumamon, Funassyi, and Chiitan, who have gained international recognition and have reached celebrity status in Japan.

== Etymology ==
The name yuru-kyara is a contraction of yuru'i mascot character (ゆるいマスコットキャラクター, yurui masukotto kyarakutā). The adjective yurui (緩い) generally means "loose", but in this application it has a number of connotations including "gentle", "weak", "laid-back", "light-hearted", or "unimportant".

The term gotōchi-kyara (ご当地キャラ, gotōchi-kyara), meaning "local characters", has also become popular in reference specifically to local mascots, which are the large majority of yuru-kyara.

== Concept ==
The term was coined by illustrator and cultural critic Jun Miura in the early 2000s, and despite the negative connotations the title has been embraced by fans and promoters. Miura has stated that there are three main requirements that make a yuru-kyara:

1. It must convey a strong message of love for one's hometown or local region;
2. The character's movements or behaviour should be unique and unstable or awkward;
3. The character should be unsophisticated or laid-back (yurui) and lovable;

Some of these imply that the mascot must exist in kigurumi form.

Yuru-kyara are often designed by amateur artists, and many designs are seen as naive or poorly executed, or can appear to oversimplify what they represent. These characteristics generally add to their appeal, but occasionally can cause the opposite reaction: The unveiling of Sento-kun in 2008 created a lot of negative publicity, since he was regarded as "ugly" and even "blasphemous".

These "amateurish" or flawed aspects are what set yuru-kyara apart from professionally created corporate mascots (e.g. Domo-kun), professional sports mascots (such as those of Nippon Professional Baseball teams), and commercially oriented characters such as Hello Kitty and Rilakkuma – all of which are also commonplace in Japan.

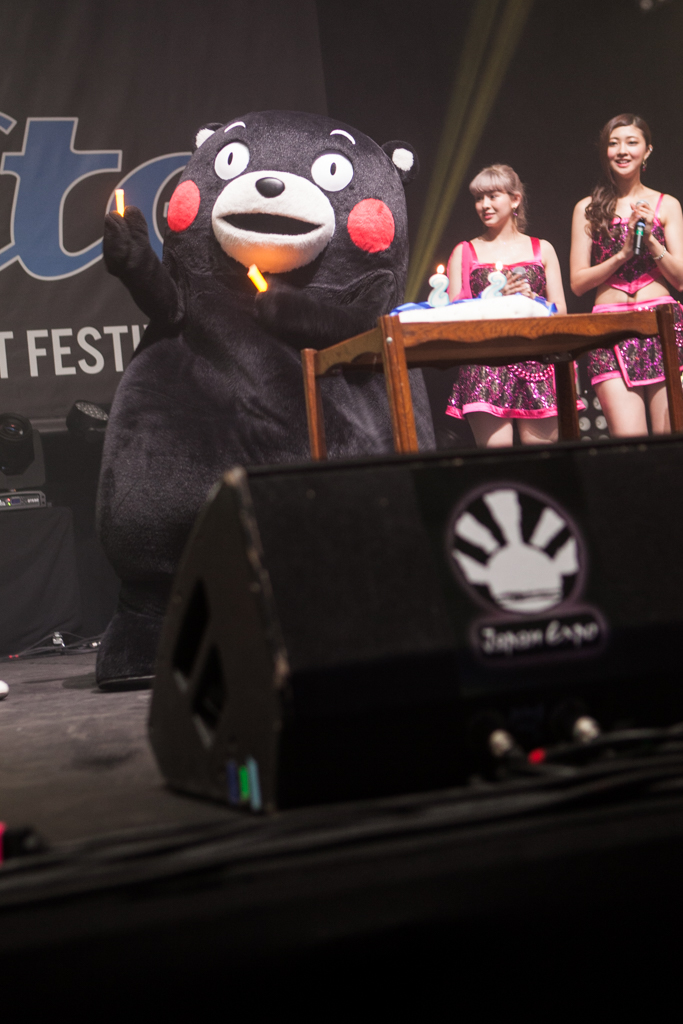
Kumamon

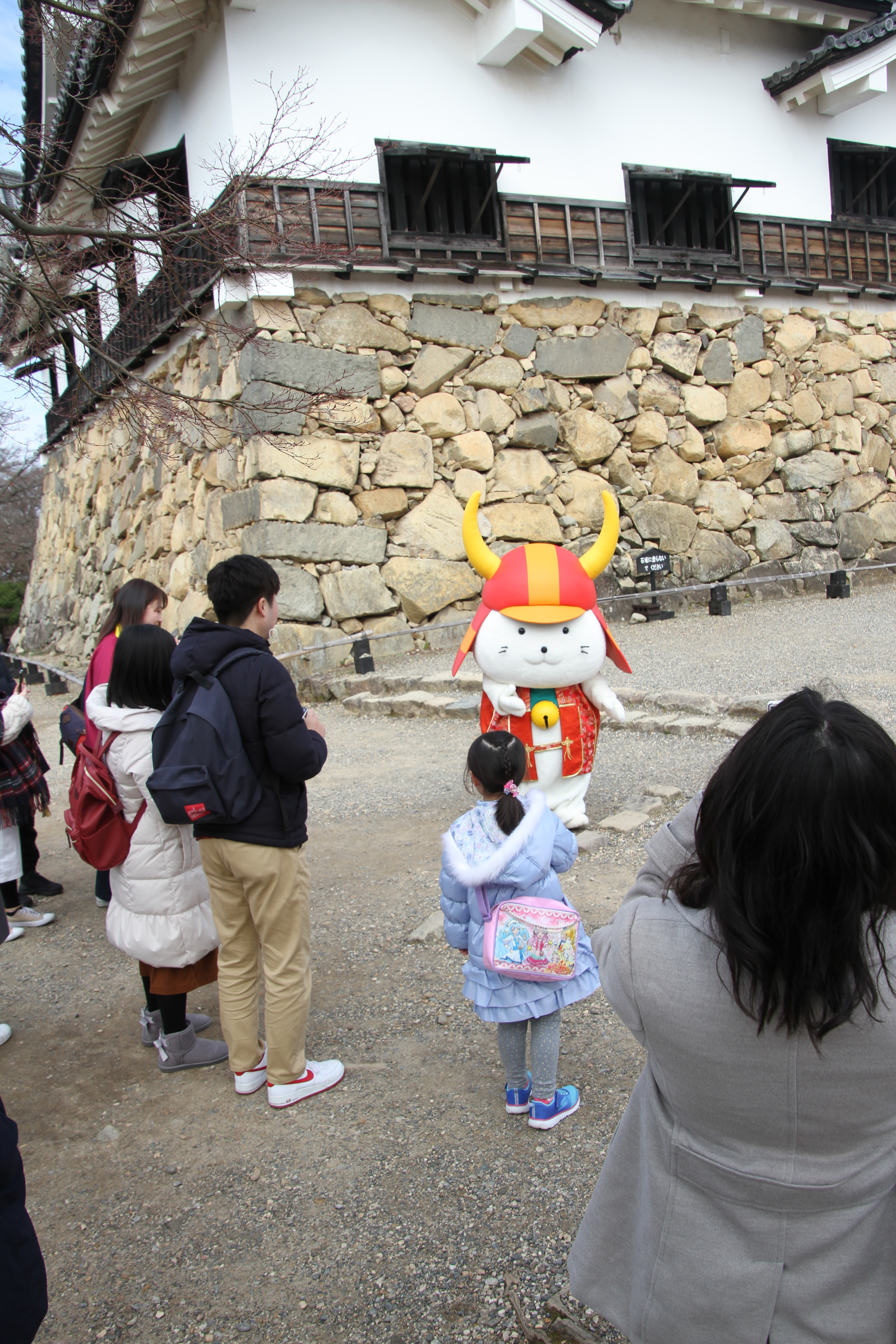
Hikonyan

== Popularity ==
The popularity of mascots like yuru-kyara in Japan has been linked to historical emotional bonds to non-human characters, such as in ancient polytheism. There are also many different yōkai in Japanese folklore, and certain types of yōkai such as kappa and tanuki have been the basis for several yuru-chara designs.

Although the concept had been around for some time, the start of the "yuru-kyara boom" is credited to Hikonyan, who was created in 2007 to mark the 400th anniversary of the founding of Hikone Castle and created a significant increase in tourism and merchandise sales for castle and the city.

Since then, the number of yuru-kyara increased throughout the country. Festivals and other events dedicated to these mascots were created, such as the Yuru-chara Matsuri (ゆるキャラまつり) held in various locations since 2008. Some mascots have also appeared in international conventions, such as Funassyi and Kumamon in the 2014 Japan Expo in Paris, France; and a small group in the 2014 Japan Matsuri in London.

Gotōchi-kyara Catalogue (ご当地キャラカタログ, gotōchi kyara katarogu) is an online database which collects information about gotōchi-chara, yuru-chara and local heroes from user submissions. In October 2014 it surpassed 3,000 character entries.

The proliferation of yuru-kyara in certain regions has been perceived to be problematic by some people. In 2014, the Osaka government expressed concern that there were too many local mascots, and it was diluting brand identity.

Chiitan, an unofficial mascot for Susaki, Kōchi Prefecture, became popular due to its chaotic and often violent behavior, which generated significant controversy.

=== Yuru-kyara Grand Prix ===
2010 saw the start of the Yuru-chara Grand Prix (ゆるキャラグランプリ, yuru kyara guranpuri), an annual event where the most popular mascot is determined by public voting. Previous winners include Hikonyan and Kumamon.

There were 1,727 entrants in the 2015 Grand Prix, over ten times the number in the first contest. 1092 entries consisted of gotōchi-kyara (local characters), and 635 were corporate or other characters. Results were announced on 23 November with 50.57 million total internet votes (over twice the number of votes in 2014) and almost seven million votes going to the winning mascot, Shusse Daimyō Ieyasu-kun. Around 77,000 people attended the awards event in Hamamatsu.

Year	Entrants	Winner
2010	169	Hikonyan (Hikone, Shiga)
2011	349	Kumamon (Kumamoto Prefecture)
2012	865	Barysan (Imabari, Ehime)
2013	1,580	Sanomaru (Sano, Tochigi)
2014	1,699	Gunma-chan (Gunma Prefecture)
2015	1,727	Shusse Daimyō Ieyasu-kun (Hamamatsu, Shizuoka)
2016	1,421	Shinjou-kun (Susaki, Kōchi)
2017	1,158	Unari-kun (Narita, Chiba)
2018	?	Kapal (Shiki, Saitama)
2019	?	Arukuma (Nagano Prefecture)
2020	?	Takata no Yume-chan (Rikuzentakata, Iwate)

In 2023, the event was rebranded to Yuruverse (ゆるバース, yurubāsu) and a partnership was announced with Spiral.AI, a generative AI company, with plans to "enable voice-communication in the metaverse" and for mascots to engage with audiences as VTubers.

=== Records ===
Yuru-kyara gatherings have been involved in creating two Guinness World Records:

- Largest mascot dance: 134 mascots danced together in Huis Ten Bosch theme park in 2013.
- Largest gathering of mascots: 376 mascots at the 4th annual Yuru-chara Summit in Hanyū, 2013.

== Features ==
Yuru-chara try to portray some aspect of the place they are representing, be it local produce, a historical figure or legend, local wildlife, architecture or geography. This is often incorporated into their physical appearance in an amusing or unusual way, e.g. Fukka-chan (ふっかちゃん), mascot of Fukaya has two green onions sprouting out of its head (green onions being a popular product of Fukaya). Their name may also be a play on words, such as with Kumamon.

In public appearances, most yuru-chara are silent, and usually act in a playful or childish manner. Some exceptions include Funassyi and Chicchai Ossan (ちっちゃいおっさん, small middle-aged man) who do talk in character, but neither are officially affiliated with any local government.

=== Merchandise ===
Many yuru-kyara have various associated merchandise as an alternative source of income. These typically include stuffed toys, keychains, sticker sets for Line (a popular instant messaging system in Japan) and stationery. As an acknowledgement of the large adult fanbase of yuru-chara, there are also some more adult-oriented products such as sake and themed credit cards.

=== Music ===
Yuru-kyara often have a theme song with related dance routine, such as Kumamon's Kumamon Taisō (くまモン体操) which has seen over 2.6 million views on YouTube. Funassyi has also released two novelty singles in 2013 and 2014, and an album in 2014. A band also formed in 2013 called GCB47 (ご当地キャラクター・バンド・よんじゅうなな, gotōchi character band yonjū-nana) – the name being a play on the group AKB48 and the number of prefectures in Japan – which consists of six yuru-chara who play instruments live in costume and singer/guitarist Yohsuke Ishida. They have also released a single, and often perform at yuru-kyara events.

=== Video games ===
In 2014, Bandai Namco Games released the video game Gotōchi Testsudō: Gotōchi-chara to Nipponzenkoku no Tabi (ご当地鉄道 ～ご当地キャラと日本全国の旅～, Local Railway: A journey through Japan with gotōchi-chara) on Nintendo 3DS and Wii U. It is a sugoroku-style party game where players travel around Japan and encounter gotōchi-chara (120 are featured in the game) along with local products and specialities. The character Ojapon (おじゃポン) was created to promote the game, and was entered into the 2014 Yuru-chara Grand Prix.

Funassyi and Kumamon have made appearances in 2014 releases of the Taiko no Tatsujin video games. Kumamon also featured in the 2014 3DS game Yo-Kai Watch 2.

== See also ==
- Chibi (slang)
- Choruru
- Funassyi
- Hikonyan
- Kigurumi, costumed characters
- Kumamon
- Mayumaro
- Shimanekko, the mascot character for Shimane Prefecture
- Local hero (Japan)
