= Choruru =

Choruru (ちょるる)
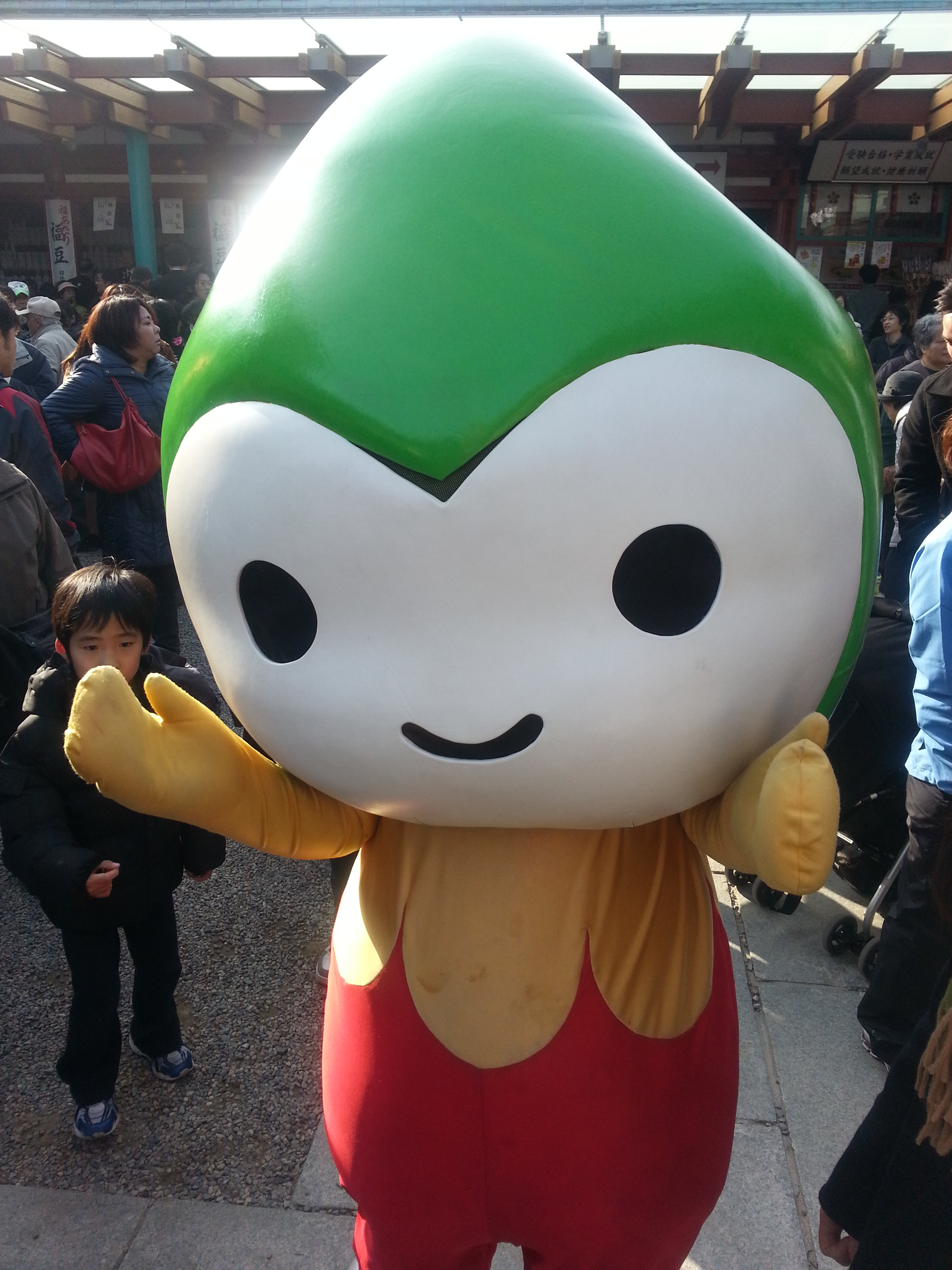
- First appearance: 2007
- Created by: Mitsuo Fukunaga (PH Graphics)
- Character Type: Regional Mascot

In-universe information
- Gender: Unspecified
- Occupation: Yamaguchi Prefecture PR General Manager
- Nationality: Japanese
- Region: Yamaguchi
- Official Website: ちょるるの部屋 (in Japanese)

Choruru (ちょるる) is a mascot character who was created for the 66th annual National Sports Festival of Japan and 11th annual National Sports Festival for People with Disabilities which were held in Yamaguchi Prefecture in 2011. After the tournaments, he became head of the Oidemase Yamaguchi Tourism Advertising Department, before becoming the Yamaguchi Prefecture PR General Manager in October 2012.

== Outline ==
Choruru was first introduced on 14 October 2007 at the 'Oidemase! Yamaguchi Kokutai Jump Up Festa 2007'. His design features green antennae which have the shape of the first kanji character for Yamaguchi (山), which catch the abundant energy of the people and nature. His white face is the shape of the second kanji character for Yamaguchi (口), representing the prefecture's name on his head.

The character design was chosen from the 80 entries from a prefecture-wide design contest, with a proposal by Shunan city based design company Sansou Ltd being used. Although the design for Choruru was actually by Mitsuo Fukunaga, of Shunan city based PH Graphics who submitted the design through Sansou Ltd, when the character was officially announced it was accredited to Sansou Ltd president Hirofumi Shigeoka. A civil trial was brought about by Fukunaga to clarify his position as the creator of Choruru, and in 2011 both parties reached a settlement in which Fukunaga was once again declared as Chorurus "art director-cum-designer". As a further point, due to the submission rules for the design contest, the copyright for Choruru belongs to the Oidemase Yamaguchi National Sports Festival Executive Committee.

His name was based on a modified word form from the Yamaguchi dialect ～ちょる(～している doing ~), and was selected from the 9,227 entries that were submitted during the open entry session from 14 October to 30 November, while his design was on show. His name was officially decided and announced as "Choruru" in issue 8 of the "Oidemase! Yamaguchi Kokutai" PR Brochure, published in July 2008.

== History ==
=== Oidemase Yamaguchi National Sports Festival ===
From 2008 onward, Choruru participated in a range of events across Yamaguchi prefecture in order to promote the National Sports Festival. Various types of promotional material, pamphlets and commemorative merchandise were made using Choruru's image, and even a song (Fight, Choruru!) and dance (Choruru Dance) were created for him. The total sales of related goods, including Choruru National Sports Festival pin badges, topped a ground breaking two hundred and eight million yen.

=== Oidemase Yamaguchi Year Tourism Exchange Campaign ===
When the Oidemase Yamaguchi National Sports Festival drew to a close, Choruru's role as the festival mascot also ended. However, from 1 November 2011 he was appointed as "Head of the Oidemase Yamaguchi Tourism Advertising Department", a role to continue the promotion of Yamaguchi prefecture as the mascot for the "Oidemase Yamaguchi Year Tourism Exchange Campaign". Though his role was only supposed to last the duration of the campaign, the then governor of Yamaguchi, Sekinari Nii, announced that there might be other opportunities for Choruru besides just tourism, suggesting that there was potential for Choruru to have a PR role in other campaigns.

=== Yamaguchi Prefecture PR General Manager ===
On 13 September 2012 at the Yamaguchi Tourism Commission, Choruru's promotion to Yamaguchi Prefecture PR General Manager, a role not limited to the field of tourism but also to widen the appeal of Yamaguchi Prefecture, was recognised. The official appointment certificate was handed over on 11 October by then governor Shigetarō Yamamoto. It was also at this time that the commercial use for Choruru's character design became available without charge. At least 50 applications for commercial goods such as soft toys and sweets were made within the first month of availability, with applications coming with outside the prefecture from Hiroshima and Chiba prefectures.

=== Yuru-chara Grand Prix ===
Voting for the 2012 Yuru-chara Grand Prix opened on 15 September 2012, with Choruru making his first entry into the competition on 20 September, successfully climbing to second place by early October. Even though he called for support by visiting the entrance of the Yamaguchi Prefectural Office, the Tokuyama Zoo in Shunan and so on, the gap between him and the top ranked yuru-chara, Barysan from Imabari city in Ehime, in terms of votes received was very large. As such, at an emergency press conference held on 19 October at the Yamaguchi Prefectural Office, as well as a declaration of determination for victory, it was announced that Choruru would visit each area of the prefecture on a promotional tour to call for support. When the final results were announced on 25 November 2012, although he could not close the gap on Barysan, he managed to maintain second place having received 462,970 votes.

=== National Health and Welfare Festival ===
On 27 November 2012, it was announced that Choruru was selected to be the event mascot for the 28th National Health and Welfare Festival. It will be held in Yamaguchi prefecture in 2015 under the name Nenrinpikku Oidemase! Yamaguchi 2015 (ねんりんピックおいでませ！山口2015).

=== Hello Kitty Friendship Pact ===
On 25 February 2013 at the Yamaguchi Prefectural Office, Choruru and Hello Kitty were joined in a "Friendship Pact". Following the two characters meeting at the 2012 Sanrio Thanks Party, an event held at Sanrio Puroland in December 2012, Yamaguchi began working toward associating with Sanrio. This was the first such pact Hello Kitty had made with another character. Afterwich both characters worked toward sending joy to people by way of participating in each other's events and collaborating on promotional goods and materials.

== See also ==
- Funassyi
- Hikonyan
- Kigurumi
- Kumamon
- National Sports Festival of Japan
