= Shimanekko =

Mascot of Shimane Prefecture, Japan

- Website: Official website (in Japanese)

Shimanekko (しまねっこ) is a Japanese "yurukyara" mascot character representing Shimane Prefecture.

== See also ==
- Hikonyan, the mascot for Hikone
