= Taiko no Tatsujin =

Video game series

- English logo since 2018, design revised in 2021 used from Pop Tap Beat onwards
- Genre: Rhythm
- Developers: Namco; Bandai Namco Studios; Bandai Namco Amusement Lab
- Publishers: Namco; Bandai Namco Entertainment; Bandai Namco Amusement
- Creator: Tatsuhisa Yabushita
- Platforms: Arcade, PlayStation 2, Nintendo DS, Wii, Advanced Pico Beena, PlayStation Portable, Nintendo 3DS, PlayStation Vita, iOS, Android, Wii U, PlayStation 4, PlayStation 5, Nintendo Switch, macOS, Microsoft Windows, Xbox One, Xbox Series X/S
- First release: Taiko no Tatsujin; February 21, 2001
- Latest release: Taiko no Tatsujin: Rhythm Connect; September 22, 2022

Taiko no Tatsujin (太鼓の達人; lit. 'Master of the Taiko') is a Japanese video game series developed and published by Namco (now Bandai Namco Entertainment). In the games, players simulate playing a taiko drum in rhythm with music. The series has released titles for the arcade as well as for console and mobile platforms, including PlayStation 2, Advanced Pico Beena, PlayStation Portable, Nintendo DS, Wii, Nintendo 3DS, Wii U, PlayStation Vita, PlayStation 4, PlayStation 5, Nintendo Switch, Xbox One, Xbox Series X/S, Microsoft Windows, iOS, Android, and Japanese feature phones.

Although the series was primarily developed for the Japanese market, it has also been released in English, Chinese, and Korean.

== Gameplay ==
=== Objective ===
The main objective of Taiko no Tatsujin games is to hit a special taiko drum controller, or a virtual equivalent, in rhythm with a selected piece of music. Players must strike the drum in time with the notes (Note: Japanese: 音符, Hepburn: onpu) that scroll from right to left on the screen.

A song is cleared when the spirit gauge (Note: Japanese: 魂ゲージ, Hepburn: tamashii geeji) is filled beyond the target (Note: Japanese: ノルマ, Hepburn: noruma) by achieving sufficient accuracy by the end of the song.

=== Controls ===
Arcade versions of Taiko no Tatsujin are equipped with simulated taiko drums that register hits when struck with drumsticks (bachi).

Console versions primarily use buttons for gameplay, although certain devices support additional input methods:

- A virtual taiko drum is available on devices with touchscreens (such as the DS, 3DS, Wii U, iPod Touch, smartphones, and Nintendo Switch), which can be played using either a stylus or fingers.
- Dedicated drum peripherals simulating real taiko drums can be purchased separately for the PS2, Wii, Wii U, PS4, and Nintendo Switch versions. This peripheral is included with the physical North American release for the PlayStation 2 and the European release for the Nintendo Switch.

=== Notes ===
The variety of notes in the game primarily consists of red and blue markers. The red don (ドン) note requires the player to strike the face of the drum, while the blue ka (カッ) note requires striking the rim.

Additional note types require rapid, consecutive hits on the drum. These include the yellow bar, the balloon note (referred to as a "burst note" in Taiko: Drum Master), and the Kusudama ball (represented as a yam in older releases starting from the PlayStation 2 Godaime version, or as a Mallet note in Drum Session! and Drum 'n' Fun!).

Unlike other rhythm games such as Guitar Hero, the drumming in Taiko no Tatsujin serves as an accompaniment rather than replacing an instrument in the music. Missing a note does not result in off-key sounds or interruptions to the background track, and players are free to strike the drum at any time, provided it does not interfere with nearby notes that could trigger a penalty.

=== Difficulty ===
Most games in the Taiko no Tatsujin series offer four main difficulty levels: Easy (Note: Japanese: かんたん, Hepburn: kantan), Normal (Note: Japanese: ふつう, Hepburn: futsū), Hard (Note: Japanese: むずかしい, Hepburn: muzukashii), and "Oni" (Note: Japanese: おに; lit. demon), known as "Extreme" in the English versions of Drum 'n' Fun, Drum Session, and the arcade releases. Oni represents the highest standard difficulty level. In addition, since the console game "Oni" (Note: Japanese: おに; lit. demon) certain songs may have a 5th difficulty level called "Ura Oni" (Note: Japanese: うらおに; lit. demon), however it is still called "Oni" in the in-game difficulty menu.

The sequence of notes in each level is referred to as a notechart (Note: Japanese: 譜面, Hepburn: fumen).

==== Inner notecharts ====
First appearing in Taiko no Tatsujin Wii: Dodon! to Nidaime (Note: Japanese: 太鼓の達人Wii ドドーンと2代目!), some songs feature additional inner notecharts (Note: Japanese: 裏譜面, Hepburn: ura fumen), often referred to by fans as "Ura Oni." These serve as alternative versions of the standard notecharts and are typically more challenging. Although originally available across multiple difficulty levels, inner notecharts later became exclusive to the Oni/Extreme level.

In some cases, inner notecharts alter the arrangement or version of a song, and in arcade releases, they may even switch to an entirely different track. Beginning with the third-generation arcade release in 2011, these inner versions became categorized as separate songs.

==== Notechart branching ====
Certain songs include notechart branching (Note: Japanese: 譜面分岐, Hepburn: fumen bunki) within specific difficulty levels. Depending on the player's performance, the game dynamically switches between the Normal notechart (Note: Japanese: 普通譜面, Hepburn: futsuu fumen), Professional notechart (Note: Japanese: 玄人譜面, Hepburn: kurōto fumen), or Master notechart (Note: Japanese: 達人譜面, Hepburn: tatsujin fumen). In some songs, such as "Hyakka Ryoran," a drumroll appears at the beginning, allowing the player to choose among the three notechart paths.

=== Gameplay options ===
Various aspects of gameplay in Taiko no Tatsujin can be customized according to the player's preference:

- Players can select alternative instruments or sound effects to replace the traditional taiko drum sounds.
- Gameplay modifiers can be applied to adjust elements such as note speed, reversed notecharts (with red and blue notes swapped), or randomized note arrangements.
- In console versions, players can enable the "Auto" mode to have the notechart played automatically and perfectly; however, scores are not recorded in this mode. Additional options include "Perfect", which ends the song immediately after the first missed note, and "Spartan", which restarts the entire song upon a missed note. Earlier in the game series you can now aim for "Donderful Combo" by getting a "Full Combo" without receiving any "Ok"

== Development ==
Following the successes of Beatmania (1997) and Dance Dance Revolution (1998), both released by Konami, Namco had originally planned to develop a guitar-based rhythm game for arcades. However, these plans were cancelled following the release of what was referred to internally as the Four Guitar Brothers (Note: Japanese: ギター4兄弟, Hepburn: gitā yon-kyōdai), a set of four arcade games that had all released in 1999 (those being Guitar Jam; Namco's arcade port of Virtual Music's Quest for Fame; Um Jammer Lammy NOW!; and Million Hits). As a result, in 2000, director Ken Nakadate and visual art director Takehito Sasaoka would propose a taiko-based game instead, with the latter demonstrating the basic concept by attaching tape to the bottom of a plastic bucket and striking it with sticks in time with music. Managing Director Yukio Ishikawa would commission a prototype to be used as part of a location test in Yokohama in the summer of 2000: although the sales department had predicted that Namco would only be able to sell 100 units to arcades, the test proved to be extremely popular. The advanced age of CEO Masaya Nakamura, who was 75 at the time of development and would retire in 2002, had previously led to rumours within the company that he was losing interest in video games as a whole. Despite this, he would continue to playtest the company's new games. When it came to test the prototype, he would begin to play it before the team had finished explaining the project; afterwards, he turned to them, smiled, and simply said "this is good." Nakamura would then name the game Taiko no Tatsujin.

The main character of the game was originally intended to be a realistic young man wearing only a fundoshi, a traditional Japanese undergarment: although he was intended to fit in with the theme of a Japanese festival, this was rejected for being too surreal. Don-chan, Ka-chan, and the other characters were then created by a designer unrelated to the project, Yukiko Yokō, who had joined Namco in 1994: after she sketched a "taiko alien" due to the game having been demonstrated throughout the company building, she was brought onto the game and would continue to work on the franchise until 2007.

== Releases ==
Timeline of arcade releases
2001	Taiko no Tatsujin
2001	Taiko no Tatsujin 2
2002	Taiko no Tatsujin 3
2002	Taiko no Tatsujin 4
2003	Taiko no Tatsujin 5
2004	Taiko no Tatsujin 6
2005	Taiko no Tatsujin 7
2006	Taiko no Tatsujin 8
2006	Taiko no Tatsujin 9
2007	Taiko no Tatsujin 10
2008	Taiko no Tatsujin 11
2008	Taiko no Tatsujin 12
2009	Taiko no Tatsujin 12 Don~! to Zoryoban
2009	Taiko no Tatsujin 13
2010	Taiko no Tatsujin 14
2011	Taiko no Tatsujin (2011)
2012	Taiko no Tatsujin KATSU-DON
2013	Taiko no Tatsujin Sorairo ver.
2013	Taiko no Tatsujin Momoiro ver.
2014	Taiko no Tatsujin Kimidori ver.
2015	Taiko no Tatsujin Murasaki ver.
2015	Taiko no Tatsujin White ver.
2016	Taiko no Tatsujin Red ver.
2017	Taiko no Tatsujin Yellow ver.
2018	Taiko no Tatsujin Blue ver.
2019	Taiko no Tatsujin Green ver.
2020	Taiko no Tatsujin Nijiiro ver.

=== Taiko no Tatsujin: Tatakon de Dodon ga Don ===
Taiko no Tatsujin: Tatakon de Dodon ga Don (Note: Japanese: 太鼓の達人 タタコンでドドンがドン) is the first official home console release in the Taiko no Tatsujin franchise. The game was released for the PlayStation 2 on October 24, 2002, in Japan.

Tatakon de Dodon ga Don includes 29 songs selected from the first three arcade versions of Taiko no Tatsujin, featuring tracks such as "Marionette" by Boøwy, "Traveling" by Hikaru Utada, "Pieces of a Dream" by Chemistry, and "Mr. Moonlight (Ai no Big Band)" by Morning Musume. (Note: From the albums Psychopath, Deep River, The Way We Are, and 4th Ikimashoi!, respectively.)

The PlayStation 2 version also introduced several new original songs exclusive to this release, including "Stepping Wind" from Klonoa 2: Lunatea's Veil.

=== Taiko: Drum Master ===
Taiko: Drum Master is the first official North American release in the Taiko no Tatsujin franchise. It was released exclusively for the PlayStation 2 on October 26, 2004, in North America, and later on March 17, 2005, in Japan.

Unlike the Japanese releases, Taiko: Drum Master features primarily English-language pop music, including songs by artists such as Queen and Madonna. The game also includes theme songs from both Western and Japanese animated series, such as Dragon Ball Z—a Japanese anime dubbed in English—and Jimmy Neutron: Boy Genius.

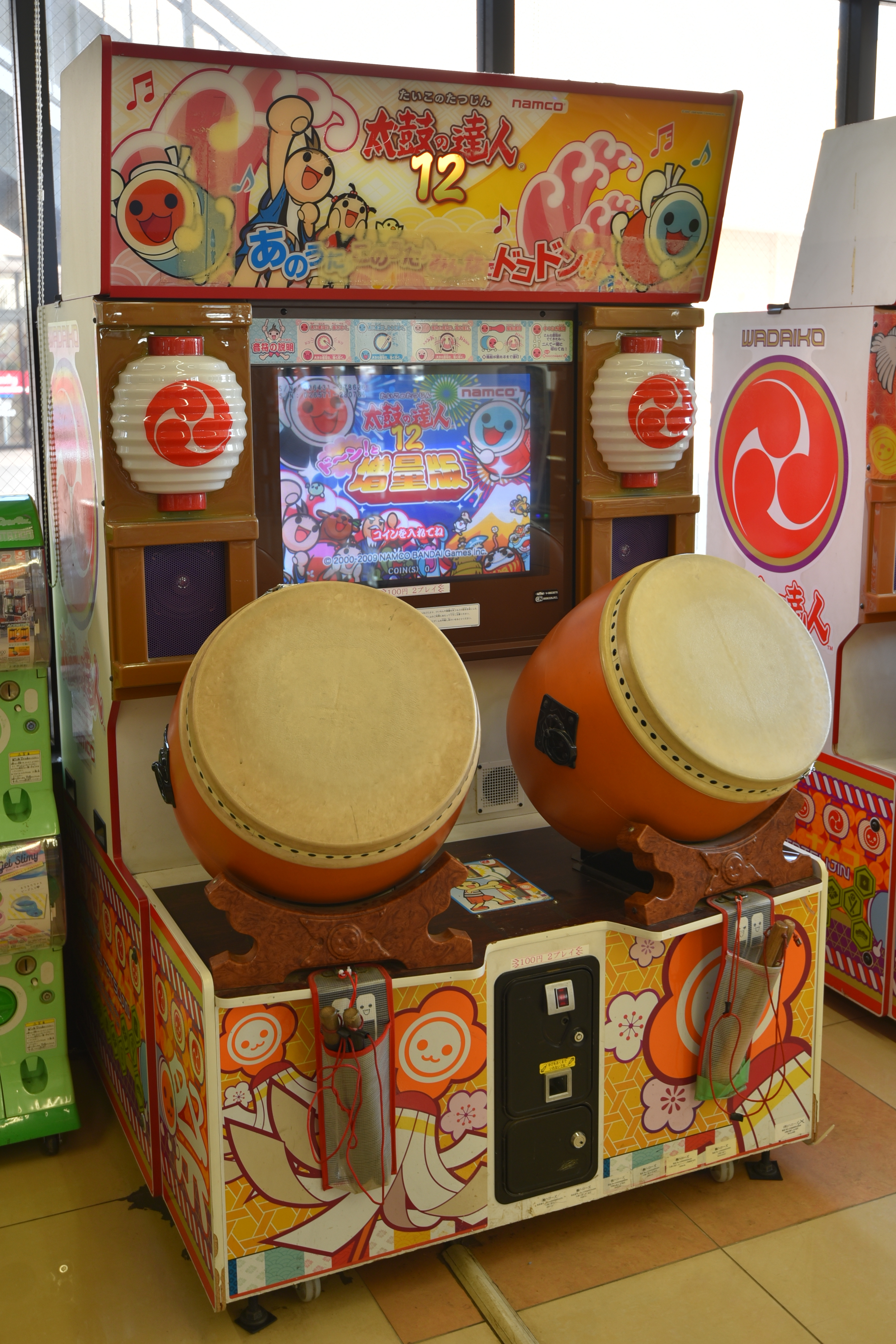
A Taiko no Tatsujin 12 arcade machine

=== Taiko no Tatsujin 13 ===
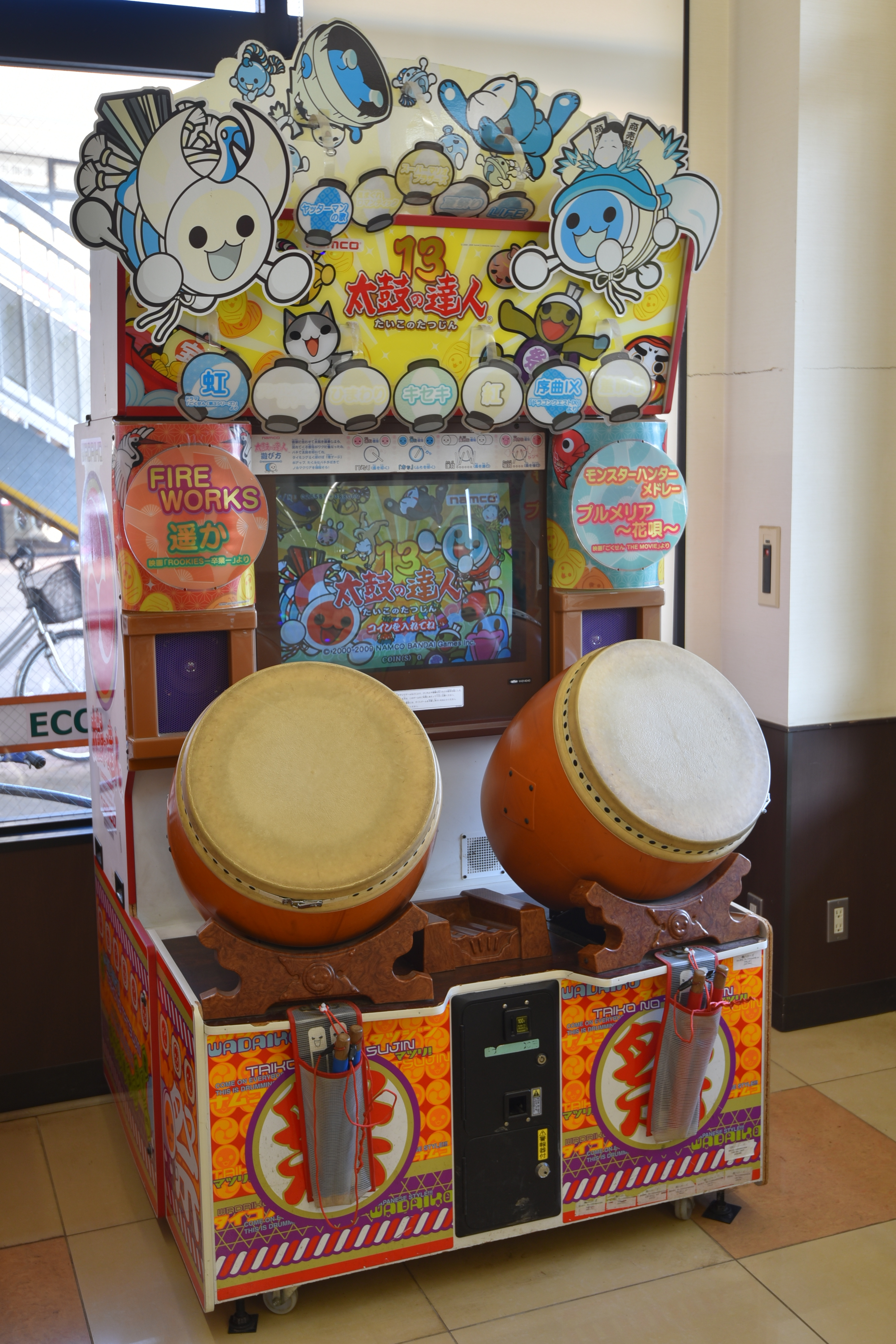
Taiko no Tatsujin 13 arcade cabinet

Taiko no Tatsujin 13 (Note: Japanese: 太鼓の達人 13) is the thirteenth arcade installment in the Taiko no Tatsujin series. The game began arcade service in December 2009.

Taiko no Tatsujin 13 was also used to host the nationwide Japanese tournament Namco Presents Taiko no Tatsujin Nippon-ichi Ketteisen 2010: The Best Master is You! (Note: Japanese: ナムコPresents 太鼓の達人 日本一決定戦 2010 ～最強の達人は君だ！), held in early 2010.

=== Taiko no Tatsujin 14 ===
Taiko no Tatsujin 14 (Note: Japanese: 太鼓の達人 14) is the fourteenth arcade installment in the Taiko no Tatsujin series. Featuring over 150 playable songs, 14 retains many gameplay elements from previous entries in the franchise.

For a limited period, Taiko no Tatsujin 14 was part of a collaboration event with McDonald's. As part of the franchise's 10th anniversary celebration, an upgrade patch was later released for the game, adding five additional songs to its tracklist.

=== Taiko no Tatsujin Plus ===
Taiko no Tatsujin Plus, (Note: Japanese: 太鼓の達人 プラス), also stylized as Taiko no Tatsujin +, is a video game application released exclusively for iOS devices on May 28, 2010, in Japan. The application is free to download, with optional purchases for additional music packs.

In June 2015, Plus introduced the All-you-can-take Music (Note: Japanese: 楽曲取り放題) service, which allowed unlimited downloads of designated songs within a set period for a fee.

The game is primarily controlled via a simulated drum surface on the device's touchscreen, though later updates added support for Roland Corporation's V-Drums electronic drum sets.

In addition to standard Taiko no Tatsujin gameplay, Plus features the Fukubiki (Note: Japanese: 福引) system, which allows players to exchange in-game points for rolls of a lucky draw, awarding randomly selected prizes.

=== Taiko no Tatsujin (2011) ===
Taiko no Tatsujin (Note: Japanese: 太鼓の達人) is the fifteenth arcade release in the Taiko no Tatsujin series. This version introduced significant changes from previous arcade entries, including the ability for players to store play data using Bandai Namco's Banapassport card, customize player characters, and set individual difficulty preferences. The game also supports online updates to add new songs and features. Initially released exclusively in Japan, the arcade cabinet became available in Southeast Asian regions—including Taiwan, Hong Kong, Malaysia, and Thailand—starting in January 2014.

Since its initial release, the game has received one or two major updates each year. Each update typically adds multiple new songs, introduces modes exclusive to that version, and provides additional costume options and challenges in Ranking Dojo Mode.

Version	Release date (Japan)	Release date (Asia)
Taiko no Tatsujin	November 16, 2011	
Taiko no Tatsujin C/N KATSU-DON	July 25, 2012	
Taiko no Tatsujin: Sorairo Ver.	March 13, 2013	
Taiko no Tatsujin: Momoiro Ver.	December 11, 2013	January 27, 2014
Taiko no Tatsujin: Kimidori Ver.	July 16, 2014	August 6, 2014
Taiko no Tatsujin: Murasaki Ver.	March 11, 2015	April 16, 2015
Taiko no Tatsujin: White Ver.	December 10, 2015	January 20, 2016
Taiko no Tatsujin: Red Ver.	July 14, 2016	September 6, 2016
Taiko no Tatsujin: Yellow Ver.	March 15, 2017	April 5, 2017
Taiko no Tatsujin: Blue Ver.	March 15, 2018	April 13, 2018
Taiko no Tatsujin: Green Ver.	March 14, 2019	May 7, 2019

=== Wadaiko Master ===
In May 2014, several Taiko no Tatsujin arcade cabinets, seemingly based on the Momoiro Ver. release, appeared in arcades in Brazil under the title Wadaiko Master. These cabinets were translated into Portuguese and featured a reduced song list, containing only 32 tracks, including three Brazilian music tracks exclusive to this edition. Wadaiko Master is offline-only and does not include network features such as Bandai Namco Passport support or software updates available in other versions.

=== Taiko no Tatsujin: Nijiiro Ver. ===
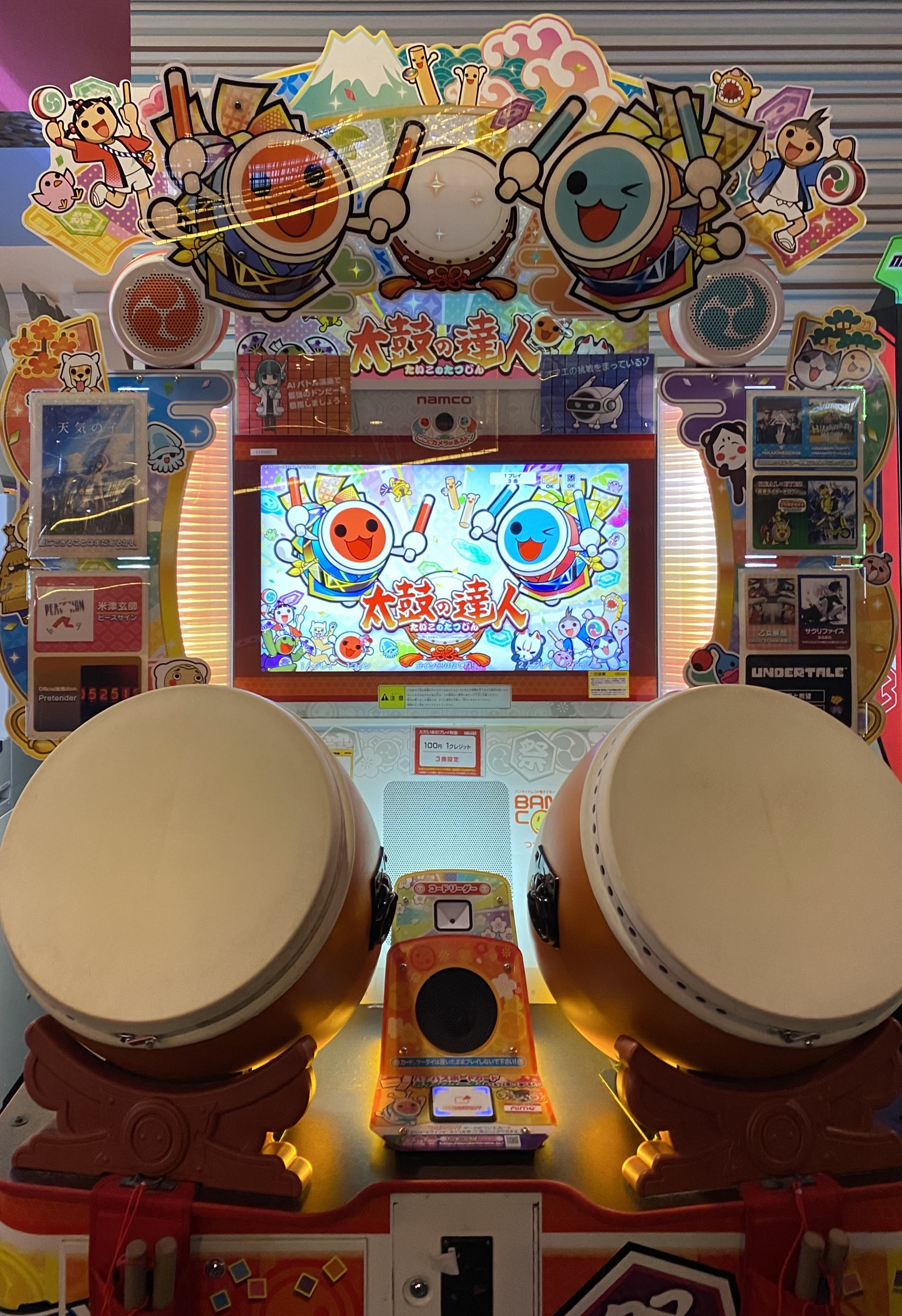
A Taiko no Tatsujin: Nijiiro Ver. arcade machine

Taiko no Tatsujin: Nijiiro Version, (Note: Japanese: 太鼓の達人 ニジイロVer.), officially known as the March 2020 Version Renovation Kit, (Note: Japanese: 2020年3月Ver.改造キット), was released in Japanese arcades on March 24, 2020, marking the start of the fourth generation of Taiko no Tatsujin arcade cabinets. Arcade operators upgraded existing cabinets from the 2011 release using the renovation kit, which included a new arcade board based on System BNA1, a 120 Hz monitor, and a QR code reader.

Nijiiro Ver. introduced several new features, including the Donderful Combo Crown, (Note: Japanese: ドンダフルコンボ王冠), awarded for clearing a song with maximum accuracy. The song settings menu was expanded to allow finer control over note playback speed. The default scoring system was revised to prioritize accuracy rather than long combos. The previous "Classical" and "Variety" genres were removed, with their songs reassigned to other categories. The game also received graphical updates, including horizontal text on the song selection menu, similar to Drum 'n' Fun. According to a livestream at JAEPO 2020, director Etou stated that these changes were intended to prepare the game for overseas players.

An international version of Nijiiro Ver. was released for Asia and Oceania in spring 2021, with a limited release in Australian arcades in October 2022. This version is multilingual, supporting English, Traditional Chinese, and Korean, and includes region-exclusive songs.

In 2023, Bandai Namco Amusement America conducted location tests of Nijiiro Ver. in the United States at multiple locations, including Illinois and Texas. The game was later confirmed for a North American release starting in November 2024.

=== Taiko no Tatsujin: Wii U Version ===
Taiko no Tatsujin: Wii U Version (Note: Japanese: 太鼓の達人 Wii Uば～じょん！) is the first Taiko no Tatsujin game developed exclusively for the Wii U, released on November 21, 2013, in Japan. The game includes 70 songs and features appearances by Golden Bomber and Super Mario Bros., as well as a collaboration campaign with the Japanese idol group Momoiro Clover Z.

Wii U Version introduces the Baton Touch Play, (Note: Japanese: バトンタッチ演奏) mode, in which multiple players take turns playing a single song in a relay race-style format. The game also supports the Wii U GamePad with a touchscreen drum, allowing play using only the GamePad without requiring a television.

Both free and paid downloadable content, including additional songs and outfit items, were made available via the Nintendo eShop.

=== Taiko no Tatsujin: Rhythmic Adventure 1 ===
Taiko no Tatsujin: Rhythmic Adventure 1, also known as Taiko no Tatsujin: Don to Katsu no Jikū Daibōken, (Note: Japanese: 太鼓の達人 どんとかつの時空大冒険), is the second Taiko no Tatsujin game developed exclusively for the Nintendo 3DS, released on June 26, 2014, in Japan. The game includes 60 songs and features guest appearances from Jibanyan from Yo-kai Watch, Airou from Monster Hunter 4, Funassyi, and Kumamon.

Rhythmic Adventure 1 features a main story in Space-time Adventure Mode, (Note: Japanese: 時空大冒険モード, Hepburn: jikū daibōken mōdo), in which series protagonists Don and Katsu travel through time, encountering various allies and enemies. Players engage in random encounter drum battles and can recruit defeated enemies as team members, similar to gameplay mechanics in Pokémon with added rhythm game elements.

Both free and paid downloadable content, including additional quests for Space-time Adventure Mode, outfit items, and extra songs, were available via the Nintendo eShop. Additional content could also be unlocked via QR codes in other media and using Spot Access functionality at designated locations.

The game was later localized into Korean and released on August 27, 2015.

=== Taiko no Tatsujin: Tokumori! ===
Taiko no Tatsujin: Tokumori! (Note: Japanese: 太鼓の達人 特盛り！) is the second Taiko no Tatsujin game developed exclusively for the Wii U, released on November 20, 2014, in Japan. The game includes 100 playable songs and features guest characters such as Funassyi, Kumamon, and Hatsune Miku.

Tokumori! introduces two new gameplay modes: Mekadon Gasha, (Note: Japanese: メカドンガシャ), a capsule toy-style system for unlocking content, and Intro-don, (Note: Japanese: イントロどん♪), a mini-game in which players guess the intro of a song. The Baton Touch Play mode from Wii U Version also returns.

Both free and paid downloadable content, including outfit items and additional playable songs, were available via the Nintendo eShop.

The game has since been removed from the Nintendo eShop.

=== Taiko no Tatsujin: V Version ===
Taiko no Tatsujin: V Version (Note: Japanese: 太鼓の達人 Vバージョン) is a Taiko no Tatsujin game developed exclusively for the PlayStation Vita, released on July 9, 2015. The game includes more than 80 playable songs, focusing on anime, Vocaloid, and video game music.

V Version features a main story mode called Donder Quest, (Note: Japanese: ドンだークエスト, Hepburn: dondā kuesuto) in which the protagonist Don embarks on an adventure with a young girl named Maple to defeat Noise and the ancient dragon Revolution. The game also includes a practice mode, Taiko Training, (Note: Japanese: 太鼓トレーニング, Hepburn: taiko toreiningu) which allows players to fast forward, rewind, and adjust the speed of songs.

A traditional Chinese version, featuring translated menu and dialogue text while retaining Japanese voice acting, was released simultaneously in Taiwan and Hong Kong. This version includes Asia-exclusive playable songs and has been continuously available since its release.

=== Taiko no Tatsujin: Atsumete ☆ Tomodachi Daisakusen! ===
Taiko no Tatsujin: Atsumete ☆ Tomodachi Daisakusen! (Note: Japanese: 太鼓の達人 あつめて★ともだち大作戦！) is the third Taiko no Tatsujin game developed exclusively for the Wii U, released on November 26, 2015, in Japan.

Coinciding with the series' 15th anniversary, the game includes an original short animation produced in collaboration with Studio Ghibli, and the first printing of the bundle version contains additional 15th anniversary-branded merchandise.

The game introduces the new Tomodachi Daisakusen! (Note: Japanese: ともだち大作戦！) mode, in which Katsu-chan befriends animals to increase popularity within the neighborhood. Other gameplay modes from previous Wii U titles also return.

It is the only entry in the series to support amiibo, allowing players to use Animal Crossing and Pac-Man amiibo to unlock exclusive songs.

=== Taiko no Tatsujin: Rhythmic Adventure 2 ===
Taiko no Tatsujin: Rhythmic Adventure 2, also known as Taiko no Tatsujin: Dokodon! Mystery Adventure, (Note: Japanese: 太鼓の達人 ドコドン！ミステリーアドベンチャー) is the third Taiko no Tatsujin game developed exclusively for the Nintendo 3DS, released on June 16, 2016, in Japan.

The game features over 70 songs and introduces the Mystery Adventure mode, which incorporates role-playing game (RPG) elements. In this mode, Don-chan and Katsu-chan explore Mystery Spots around the world. Players progress through the story by engaging in rhythm-based battles and recruiting allies. Parties can include up to eight characters.

=== Taiko no Tatsujin: Drum Session! ===
Taiko no Tatsujin: Drum Session!, also known as Taiko no Tatsujin: Session de Dodon ga Don!, (Note: Japanese: 太鼓の達人 セッションでドドンがドン！, Hepburn: Taiko no Tatsujin: Sesshon de Dodon Ga Don!) was released exclusively for the PlayStation 4 in Japan and most parts of Asia on October 26, 2017, and in North America, Europe, and Australia on November 2, 2018.

Together with Drum 'n' Fun!, it is the first game in the series to be officially localized in North America in over a decade, and the first official release in Europe and Australia. The game is digital-exclusive in the North American, European, and Australian markets, while both physical and digital editions were released in Japan and other parts of Asia.

The game features two notable modes: Friend Session Mode, which allows players to compete against the online play data of other players, and Guest Session Mode, which enables players to challenge characters from other franchises.

=== Taiko no Tatsujin: Drum 'n' Fun! ===
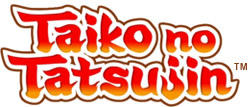
Taiko no Tatsujin English logo used in 2018–2020 for Western console releases: Drum Session, Drum 'n' Fun, and Rhythmic Adventure Pack.

Taiko no Tatsujin: Drum 'n' Fun!, also known as Taiko no Tatsujin: Nintendo Switch Version!, (Note: Japanese: 太鼓の達人 Nintendo Switchば～じょん！, Hepburn: Taiko no Tatsujin: Nintendo Switch Bājon!) was released exclusively for the Nintendo Switch. It launched in Japan, Hong Kong, Taiwan, and South Korea on July 19, 2018, and in Southeast Asia on August 9. The game was released in the United States, Europe, and Australia on November 2.

Together with Drum Session!, it is the first game in the series to be officially localized in North America in over a decade and the first official release in Europe and Australia. The game is digital-exclusive in North America but is available in both physical and digital formats in Europe, including a bundle with the Tatacon drum controller.

The game uses the Joy-Con motion controls to simulate drumsticks and includes exclusive songs from Super Mario Odyssey, Pac-Man Championship Edition 2, and Splatoon 2.

=== Taiko no Tatsujin: Rhythmic Adventure Pack ===
Taiko no Tatsujin: Rhythmic Adventure Pack, also known as Taiko no Tatsujin: Dokodon RPG Pack!, (Note: Japanese: 太鼓の達人 ドコどんRPGパック！, Hepburn: Taiko no Tatsujin: Dokodon RPG Pakku!) is a compilation of Rhythmic Adventure 1 (Don to Katsu no Jikū Daibōken) and Rhythmic Adventure 2 (Dokodon! Mystery Adventure), bundled into a single game. It was released for the Nintendo Switch on November 26, 2020 in Japan and other Asian countries, and on December 3, 2020 in Europe and North America.

Rhythmic Adventure Pack is the first Taiko no Tatsujin game to feature a story mode fully translated into English. In addition to the two RPG modes, the compilation includes Taiko Mode, which features six new songs not present in the original releases. Downloadable content from the original games is not included. The game is available in physical format in Japan and Asia, while only a digital version is offered in Europe and North America.

=== Taiko no Tatsujin Pop Tap Beat ===
Taiko no Tatsujin Pop Tap Beat was released worldwide on Apple Arcade for macOS, iOS (iPhone), iPadOS (iPad), and tvOS (Apple TV) on April 2, 2021.

The game retains the core gameplay and interface of preceding console entries, featuring many songs carried over from earlier releases. It also includes several new tracks, such as "The Power of Love", "Rhapsody in Blue", and the Enter the Dragon theme.

=== Taiko no Tatsujin: The Drum Master! ===
Taiko no Tatsujin: The Drum Master! is the first title in the series available exclusively for Xbox One, Xbox Series X/S, and Microsoft Windows. It was initially offered as part of Xbox Game Pass and released worldwide on January 27, 2022. The game contains over 70 songs and features local and online multiplayer modes. Paid downloadable songs are available for purchase in addition to the base song list.

The Drum Master! was removed from the Xbox Game Pass library in January 2023, and was discontinued and delisted on September 30th, 2025.

=== Taiko no Tatsujin: Rhythm Festival ===
Taiko no Tatsujin: Rhythm Festival is a Nintendo Switch entry in the Taiko no Tatsujin series. It was released on September 22, 2022, in Japan, September 23, 2022, in North America, and October 14, 2022, in Europe. The base game includes 76 songs. Initially, more than 500 additional songs were available through the Taiko Music Pass subscription service. With new songs added each month, alongside downloadable content (DLC) packs, the total has expanded to over 700.

New gameplay modes include DON-chan Band, in which players cooperate to perform a song together, and Great Drum Toy War, where players compete in performing a song while activating hazards against each other. Post-launch, additional modes were added, including Run! Ninja Dojo, in which players compete for the highest score while managing various hazards, and Dondoko Fit, a fitness-focused mode where players simulate hitting a giant taiko drum using their arms.

Ports for Microsoft Windows, PlayStation 5, and Xbox Series X/S were released on November 7, 2024. This version runs at 4K resolution and 120 frames per second.

=== Taiko no Tatsujin: Rhythm Connect ===
Taiko no Tatsujin: Rhythm Connect is a mobile game released on November 1, 2023, for iOS and Android. During its operation, the game was available in Japan, Taiwan, Hong Kong, Indonesia, and Thailand.

The game was discontinued on December 2, 2024.

== In other media ==
=== Collaborations ===
Taiko no Tatsujin frequently hosts collaboration campaigns with other video game franchises and companies. Collaboration efforts often include porting signature songs into Taiko no Tatsujin games, sometimes with special dancers or background designs. In return, Taiko no Tatsujin elements appear as guest characters or references in other media. Notable collaborations include:

- Ace Attorney
- Assassination Classroom
- Attack on Titan
- Appare-Ranman!
- Chain Chronicle
- Deemo
- Doraemon
- Groove Coaster
- Hatsune Miku
- Hello Kitty
- The Idolmaster
- The Idolmaster Must Songs Presented by Taiko no Tatsujin
- Kamen Rider Ex-Aid
- Kamen Rider Ghost
- Kamen Rider Build
- Kamen Rider Zi-O
- Kirby
- The Legend of Heroes: Trails of Cold Steel
- Mario Kart Arcade GP DX
- maimai
- Monster Hunter 4 Ultimate
- Neon Genesis Evangelion
- One Piece
- Pokémon
- Puzzle & Dragons
- Sachiko Kobayashi
- Sound Voltex
- Splatoon
- Studio Ghibli
- Super Mario
- Tamagotchi
- Tekken 7
- Touhou Project
- Ultraman X
- Yakuza
- Ys I & II Chronicles
- Yo-kai Watch

=== Spin-offs ===
Starting in 2005, Kids Station broadcast 26 three-minute shorts featuring the Taiko no Tatsujin characters in clay anime. A manga version was serialized in Comic BomBom. The clay anime shorts were re-released on the official Taiko no Tatsujin YouTube channel in July 2023, with options to toggle English, Chinese, and Korean subtitles.

Mini versions of Taiko no Tatsujin appear in Tales of the World: Narikiri Dungeon 3 when characters equip a costume resembling a drum, and in the Nintendo DS game Nodame Cantabile.

Playable Taiko no Tatsujin arcade machines also appear in Yakuza 5.

== Reception ==
Famitsu review scores
Game	Famitsu
Wii Minna de Party Sandaime (Wii)	32/40 (9/8/7/8)
Wii Kettei-Ban (Wii)	31/40 (8/8/7/8)
Chibi Dragon to Fushigi na Orb (3DS)	31/40 (8/8/8/7)
Wii Chogōka-Ban (Wii)	32/40 (8/8/8/8)
Wii U Version	32/40 (9/8/7/8)
Don to Katsu no Jikū Daibōken (3DS)	33/40 (8/9/8/8)
Tokumori (Wii U)	32/40 (9/8/7/8)
V Version (PlayStation Vita)	30/40 (7/8/8/7)
Atsumete★Tomodachi Daisakusen! (Wii U)	32/40 (8/8/8/8)
Dokodon! Mystery Adventure (3DS)	32/40 (8/8/8/8)

Taiko no Tatsujin games have generally received favourable reviews from critics. Most console and handheld releases received Famitsu scores of over 30 out of 40. Taiko: Drum Master received a 77-point Metacritic score based on 35 reviews.

As of 2019, the series has sold over 10 million copies on consoles.

== See also ==
- Donkey Konga
- Samba de Amigo: Party Central
