= Kumamon =

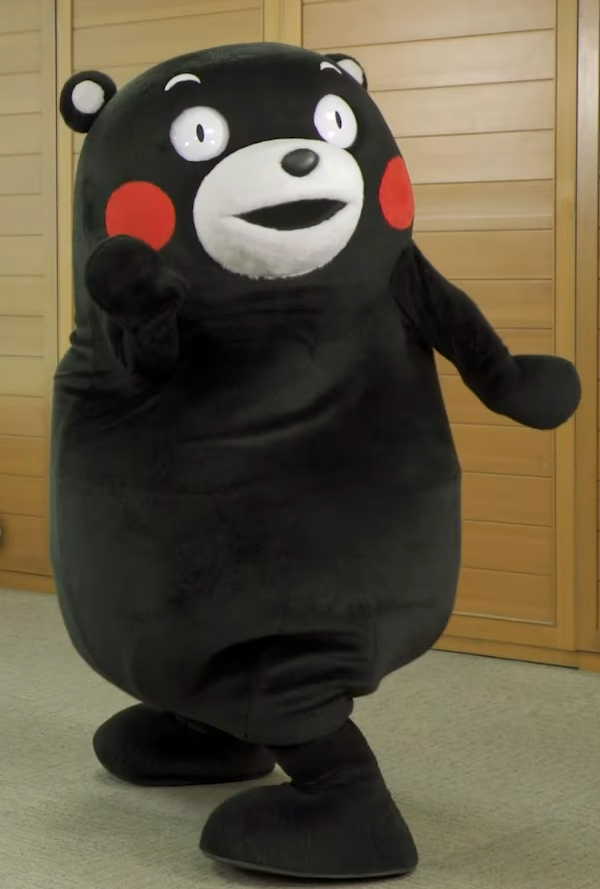
- An illustration of Kumamon
- First appearance: March 2010

In-universe information
- Gender: Male
- Birth date: March 12, 2010

Map of Japan with Kumamoto Prefecture highlighted

Kumamon (くまモン) is a mascot created by the government of Kumamoto Prefecture, Japan. It was created in 2010 for a campaign created to draw tourists to the region after the Kyushu Shinkansen line opened. Kumamon is an anthropomorphic black bear. He subsequently became nationally popular, and in late 2011, was voted top in a nationwide survey of mascots, collectively known as yuru-chara, garnering over 280,000 votes. Following his success in the contest, Kumamoto earned ¥11.8 billion (US$120 million, £79 million, €93 million) in merchandising revenue for the first half of 2012, after having only earned ¥2.5 billion (US$26 million, £17 million, €20 million) throughout all of 2011. Kumamon enjoys tremendous popularity throughout the world.

== Economic impact ==
In just two years, Kumamon has generated US$1.2 billion in economic benefits for his region, including tourism and product sales, as well as US$90 million worth of publicity, according to a recent Bank of Japan study. Sales of Kumamon items have reached ¥29.3 billion in 2012, up from ¥2.5 billion in 2011.

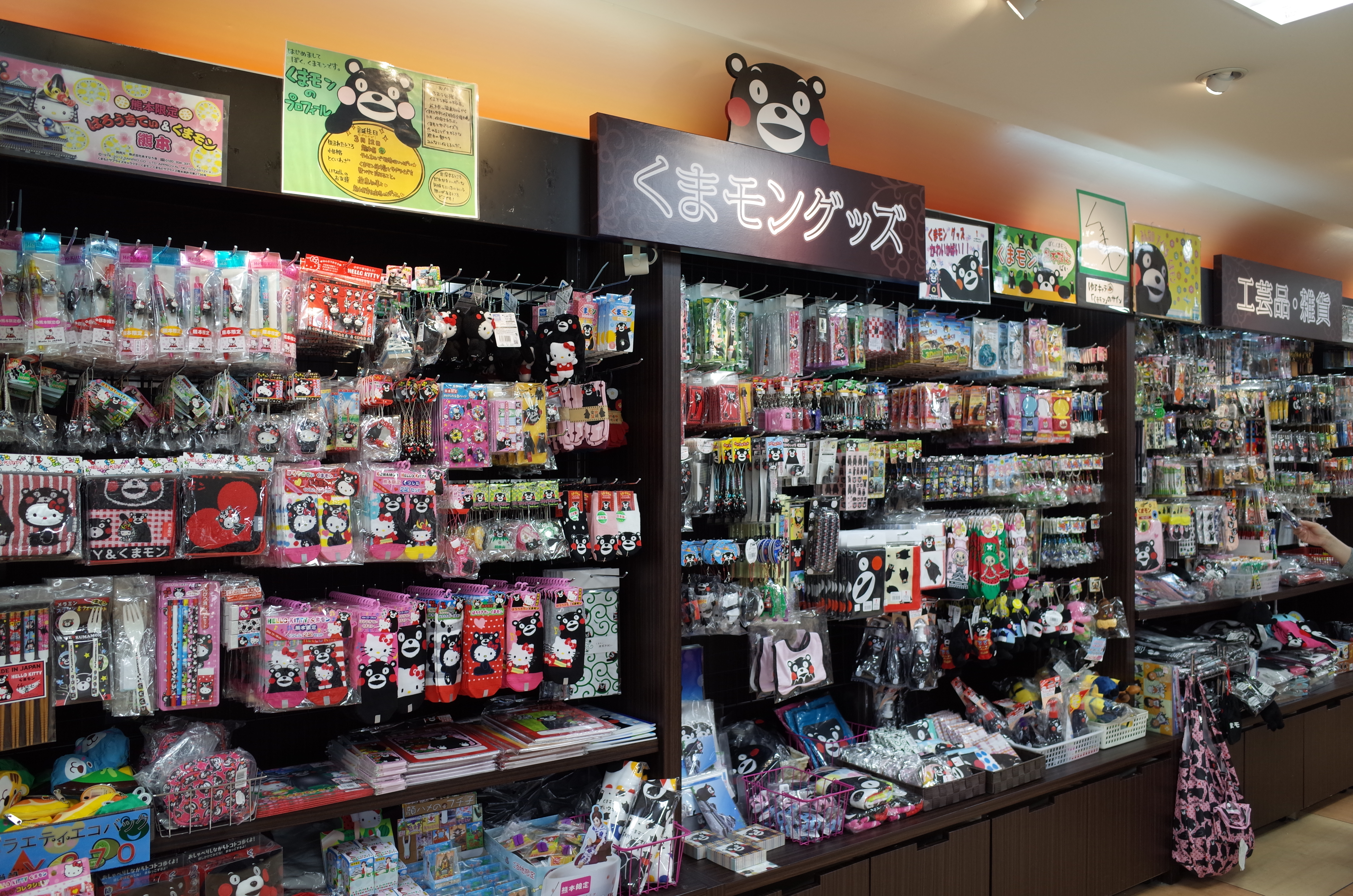
Kumamon merchandise

The Bank of Japan also estimated that Kumamon generated ¥123.2 billion in revenue during a two-year period starting from 2011.

== Success ==
A large part of Kumamon's success can be attributed to its cuteness. The unusual marketing strategy of free licensing has also contributed to Kumamon's commercial success; Kumamoto Prefecture grants usage rights for free to any individual group as long as the products promote goods and services from the prefecture. In 2018, this license was extended to foreign businesses, with aims to both boost worldwide recognition and increase tourism to the prefecture. Governor Ikuo Kabashima has said that he "want[s] to spread the Kumamon brand to the world."

== Cultural impact ==
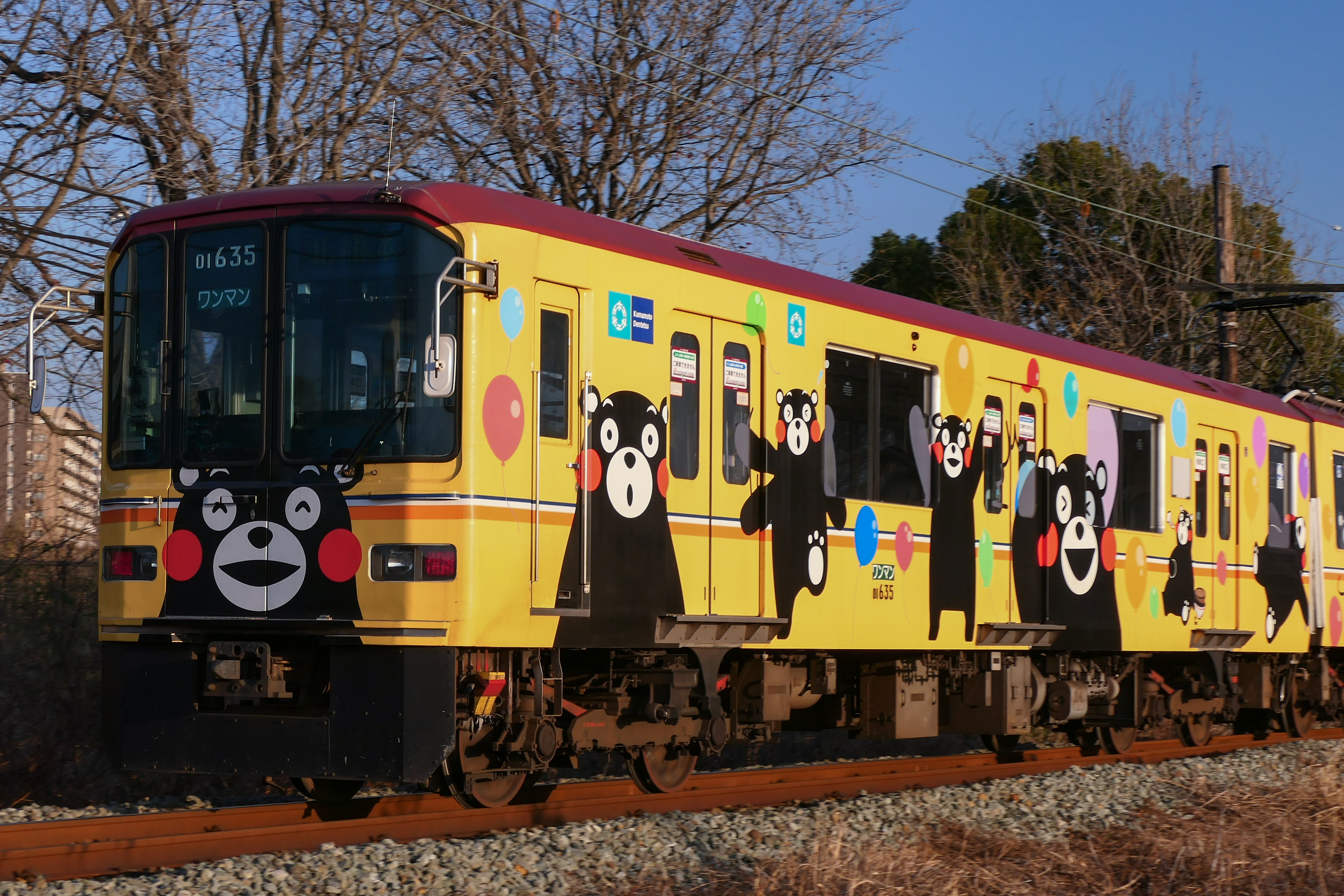
Exterior of a Kumamon-themed Kumamoto Electric Railway train (2024)

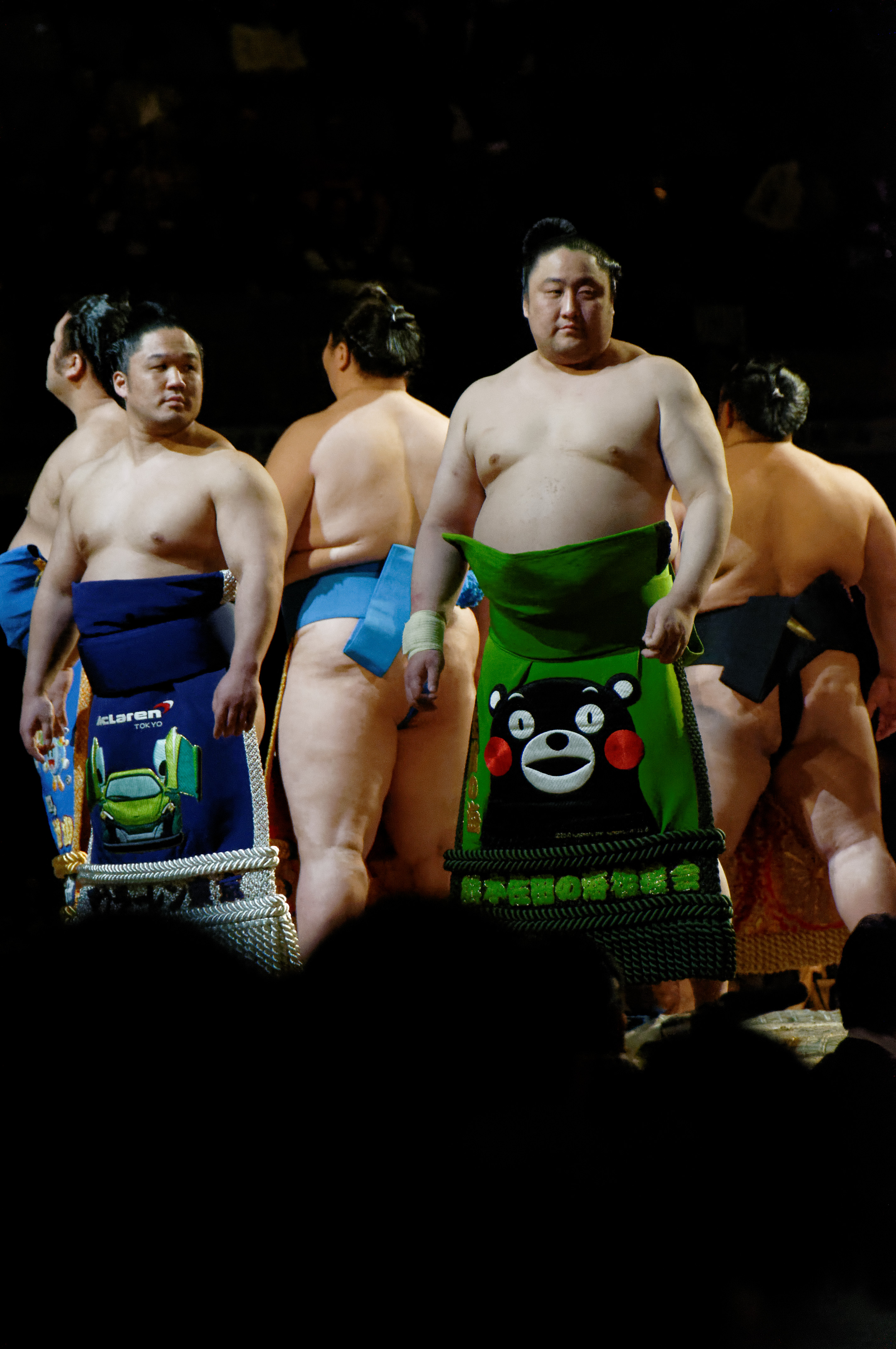
Rikishi (sumo wrestler) Sadanoumi wearing a Kumamon mawashi

This mascot appears in a minor cameo in the 2014 video game Yo-Kai Watch 2, and made an appearance in Yo-kai Watch: The Movie, following the main characters (Whisper, Nate, and Jibanyan) around. Kumamon has gained popularity as an internet meme when images of the character, usually around a large bonfire, were captioned with text reading "Why? For the glory of Satan, of course!".

Since 3 September 2018, Kumamon began regularly in-character videos uploading to its YouTube account.

== See also ==
- Choruru
- Funassyi
- Hikonyan
- Kigurumi
- Yuru-chara
