= Hikonyan =

Mascot of Hikone, Japan

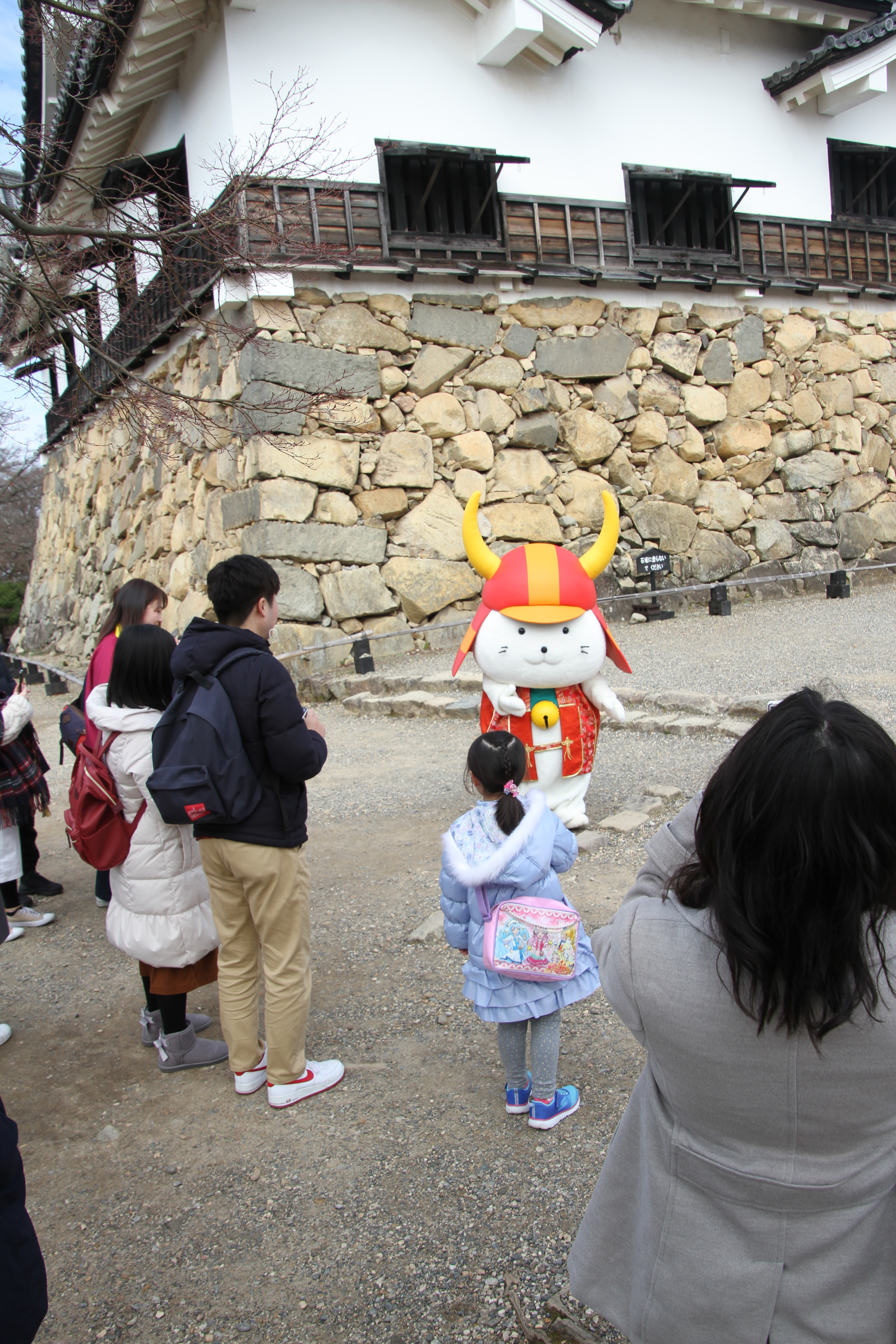
Hikonyan, the mascot of Hikone City.

Hikonyan (ひこにゃん) is a mascot created by the city government of Hikone, Japan. He was created in 2007 to mark the 400th anniversary of the founding of Hikone Castle. The character design is derived from a legend concerning maneki-neko and Ii Naotaka, the 3rd Lord of Hikone. The daimyō was beckoned by a white cat to seek shelter from a storm in a temple, and thus saved from a lightning strike. In Japanese, "nyan" is an onomatopoeia for a cat's meow. Hikonyan's samurai helmet is based on a Ii family helmet currently in the Hikone Castle museum. Hikonyan's popularity increased tourist visitation of Hikone by over 200,000 annually. The estimate of Hikonyan's effect on the tourist industry is 17.4 billion yen (approximately US$218 million) and the overall economic effects total 33.8 billion yen (US$425 million). Total merchandise sales reached about 1.7 billion yen (US$21 million) as of 2008. In 2010, Hikonyan won first place in the Yuru-chara Grand Prix competition against 168 other mascots, collectively known as yuru-chara (ゆるキャラ).

== See also ==
- Kumamon
- Funassyi
- Choruru
- Kigurumi
