= Funassyi =

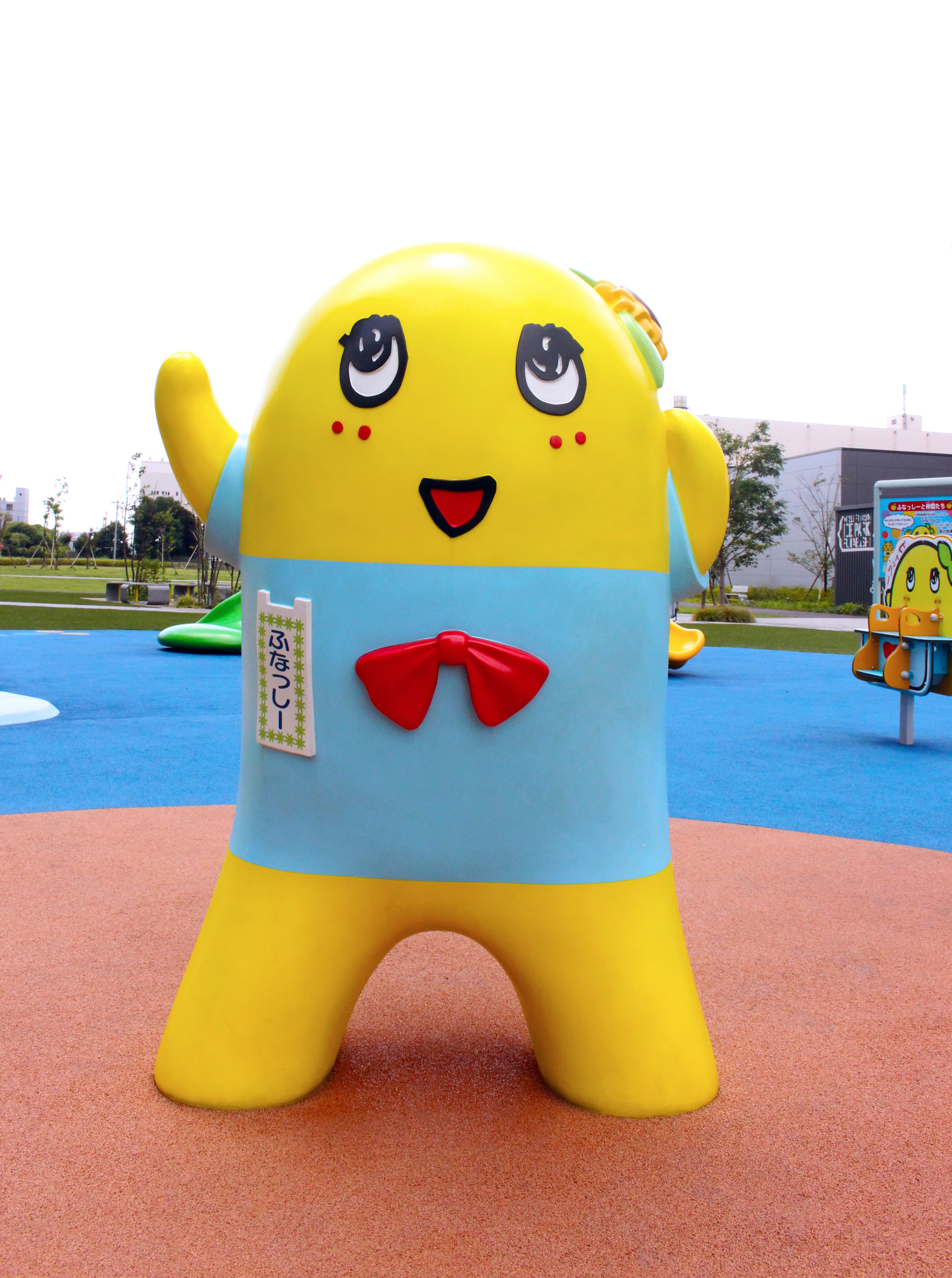
- Funassyi at Misaki Station
- First appearance: November 2011

In-universe information
- Full name: Funadius IV
- Species: Pear fairy
- Gender: Genderless
- Family: Pear trees, 248 children
- Birth date: July 4, 138

Funassyi (ふなっしー, Funasshī) is a fictional Japanese mascot character, unofficially representing the city of Funabashi in Chiba Prefecture. It was created by a citizen of Funabashi with the objective of cheering up local residents and helping promote its hometown. It has subsequently appeared at events and festivals, as well as on numerous TV programs and commercials, gaining popularity around Japan. To date, there have been 4 CD albums and 6 singles and DVDs released featuring the character. It starred in its own anime series and live-action drama special, headlined its own concert at Budokan, and merchandise has been sold at a Funassyi character goods store. While it remains as an unofficial character, Funassyi is used frequently in official events for Chiba prefecture, the city of Funabashi, and Japan itself due to their popularity and high name recognition.

== Fictional profile ==
According to the mascot's lore, Funassyi is said to be neither a girl nor a boy but is a pear (梨, nashi) fairy, and its parents are said to be ordinary pear trees. According to the in-character interviews and articles: it is the fourth of 248 children, its birthday is July 4, and it was 1,883 years old as of 2021 (in a literal time frame, it was possibly born in the year AD 138). Its full name is said to be Funadius IV (フナディウス4世, Funadiusu Yonsei), and its favorite food is peaches. The character is fond of heavy metal music, revealing that it bought Deep Purple's Machine Head as its first album, and is also fond of Aerosmith and Ozzy Osbourne.

== Behavior ==
Generally, Japanese local mascot characters, known as Yuru-kyara (ゆるキャラ, laid-back character) or gotōchi-kyara (ご当地キャラ, local character), move slowly and do not speak. Instead, they are usually accompanied by an attendant who speaks for them. Funassyi, however, always speaks for itself. It also often shrieks, jumps, dances, and makes violent movements like headbanging. When it speaks, it usually ends its sentences with "nassyi" (～なっしー, ~nasshī) which sounds like the Japanese word for "pear" (梨, nashi).

The number 274 appears in a lot of Funassyi's material (e.g. as the number of siblings, on license plates, as a house number, and as a team jersey number). Under the rules of Japanese number puns, one possible reading of this number is "fu-na-shi".

== History ==
The character was first created by a Funabashi citizen involved in retail trade in November 2011 as an illustration to advertise his business. A Twitter account was opened for it on November 21. At first, the creator didn't intend to make Funassyi a physical reality, however, the number of followers on Twitter increased far more than he expected and Funassyi became very popular. He then decided to create the Funassyi costume suit and perform while wearing it. From April 7, 2012, Funassyi videos were uploaded on YouTube.

In July 2012, Funassyi's creator (in character as Funassyi) visited the Funabashi City Office to have it authorized and supported officially, but this was rejected. Following this, Funassyi appeared at several city events uninvited and unannounced. Finally on October 30, 2013, Funassyi was awarded a certificate for its contributions to promoting Funabashi all over Japan. However, the Funabashi Municipal Government, with the mutual consent of Funassyi's creator, did not formally approve Funassyi as an official mascot of the city, since doing so might restrict the mascot's activities.

On November 27, 2013, an in-character CD called "Funa Funa Funassyi♪" (「ふな ふな ふなっしー♪」) which featured the character collaborating with Toshihiko "Takamiy" Takamizawa of The Alfee, on the Far Eastern Tribe Records label.

In June 2014, Funassyi's creator was interviewed in-character while wearing the Funassyi costume by CNN. In August 2014, Funassyi was taught how to pitch by Billy the Marlin, the official mascot of the American Miami Marlins baseball team.

On December 17, 2014, a full Funassyi CD album was released titled "Uki Uki Funassyi♪ Official Funassyi Album Pear Juice Bushaa!" (「うき うき ふなっしー♪ 〜ふなっしー公式アルバム梨汁ブシャー!〜」) on Universal Music Japan's Universal Sigma label.

On March 5, 2015, a Funassyi press conference for the overseas media at the Foreign Correspondents' Club of Japan.

On March 6, 2015, the flagship store "Funassyiland" was opened in the Lalaport Tokyo Bay shopping center in the town Funassyi is said to be from, Funabashi. A 2nd Funassyiland store opened in Umeda, Osaka in July 2015, and a 3rd store named Funassyiland Select opened in December 2015 in Harajuku, Tokyo inside the Kiddy Land store. A 4th store opened in April 2016 in Nagoya. An online Funassyiland store opened in November 2015.

From March to September 2015, an animated version of Funassyi was featured in its own short-anime series, "Funassyi's Funafunafu Days" (「ふなっしーのふなふなふな日和」), which aired every weekday during the Sukkiri! morning news and variety show on Nippon TV. The series has been released on DVD.

On January 7, 2016, a live-action 2-hour drama starring Funassyi titled "Detective Funassyi" (「ふなっしー探偵」) aired on Fuji TV.

On August 23, 2016, Funassyi headlined a concert called Nassyi Fes at Budokan in Tokyo, drawing 12,000 fans. Nassyi Fes was also held on the 29th of the same month at Osaka-jō Hall in Osaka.

== Offshoot characters and imitations ==
Funassyi's in-character "brother" Funagoro (ふなごろー, Funagorō), was introduced on October 15, 2014. Funagoro is the 56th brother of Funassyi ("Goro" is both a masculine given name and a possible number pun reading of the number 56 in Japanese). Funagoro is half-pear, half-caterpillar. The major difference between Funagoro and Funassyi is that Funagoro has a caterpillar tail that squirts silk thread. When Funagoro speaks, he usually ends the sentences with "nappi" (なっぴー).

Funassyi appears on the Tamagotchi 4U officially released by Bandai as a promotional touch spot character named "Funassyitchi". Along with the character, the package also includes a golden pear and an electric guitar.

A number of characters "inspired" by Funassyi, some sanctioned and some not, have appeared in the past. Sanctioned characters include Funyassyi, created to promote the Shironeko Project game, and Akanassyi, a red version of the usual yellow Funassyi character that was created to promote a Gundam movie in 2015.

As of 2016, the characters Funagoro and Funyassyi appear frequently at Funassyiland stores and other events, with or without Funassyi.

== Speculation regarding income and revenue generated by the character ==
There has been frequent speculation in the Japanese media regarding the personal income of Funassyi's creator, as well as the revenue he helps to generate for the city of Funabashi and Chiba prefecture. However, due to Funassyi's unofficial mascot status, its creator is not required to disclose any such figures. When asked in-character, Funassyi has given various off-the-cuff answers to the question of how much it earns over the years, ranging from "274 yen per hour" to "1000 pears per hour".

== See also ==
- Yuru-chara
- Kumamon
- Hikonyan
- Choruru
- Kigurumi
