= Sento-kun =

Japanese yuru-chara mascot

Coordinates: 34°41′05″N 135°49′58″E

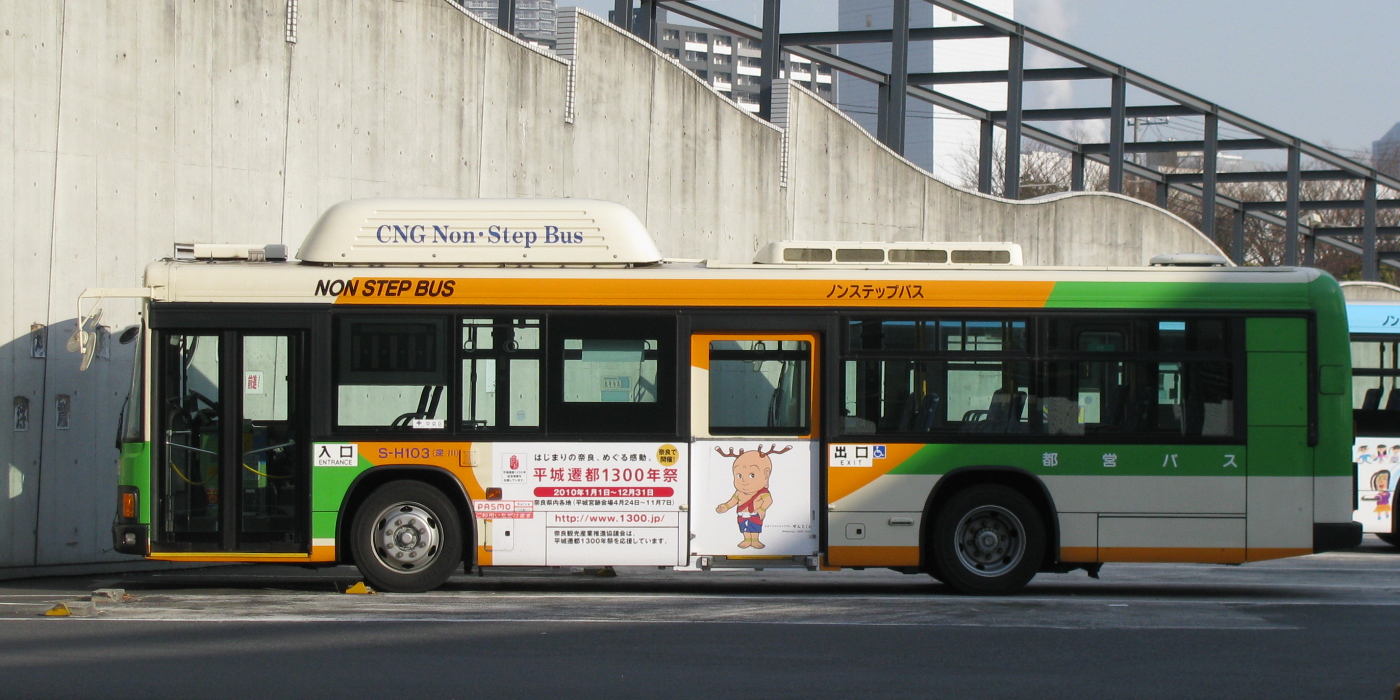
A Toei Bus with Sento-kun livery

Sento-kun (せんとくん) is a yuru-chara mascot created by Nara City Office to commemorate the 1300th anniversary of Nara Heijō-kyō, the ancient capital of Japan, in 2010.

The city of Nara has a long tradition of adopting guardian deities such as Nio (a pair of temple guardians), Asura, Jūni Shinshō (Twelve Heavenly Generals) and Shitenno (Four Guardian Kings). The new mascot was chosen by the city office to inherit their mission, and as a "personification of the energy" of the ancient capital dotted with temples, gardens and shrines.

Sento-kun is meant to resemble an amiable young boy who has the antlers of a deer, an animal which has long been regarded as a heavenly protector of the city.

== Character design ==
The character was designed by Satoshi Yabuuchi, a sculptor and professor at Tokyo University of the Arts, who was one of twelve guest designers invited by the Association for Commemorative Events of the 1300th Anniversary of the Nara-Heijyokyo Capital. The name Sento-kun was selected out of over 14,000 public applicants by the association of the event on April 15, 2008. Ever since the announcement of the official mascot character in February 2008, many media and religious groups have expressed negative opinions about the new mascot.

=== Official character profile ===
- Name: Sento-kun
- Birthday: February 12, 2008
- Personality: Sento-kun is very active, always full of vigor, and good at acquiring wisdom for tomorrow from old knowledge. Also, he is curious about all things and quite playful.
- Special Skills: taking 12 trademark poses, he is fluent in every language on earth, good at imparting his energy to others around him.
- Favorite Food: foods of Nara
- Favorite Place: any places historical and benevolent in Nara
