= Mayumaro =

Japanese mascot character

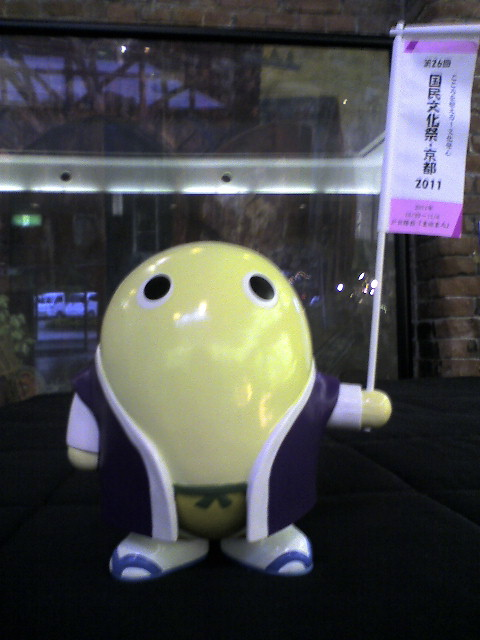
Mayumaro

Mayumaro (まゆまろ) is a yuru-kyara mascot in Japan. He is the public relations officer for Kyoto and promotes Kyoto. His motif is a silkworm cocoon.

== Description ==
Mayumaro is a mascot character of the 26th National Cultural Festival in Kyoto. His work is to encourage everyone to like Kyoto. Mayumaro lacks a mouth, so he cannot speak.

He has a sister, Mayuko. Her motif is a girl who wants to be ”maiko-san" and loves Kyoto. Unlike her brother, Mayumaro, she has a mouth.

Mayumaro is associated with a song written by Kumiko Takeshita, a singer and songwriter born in Kyoto. She wrote this song for children.

== History ==
Mayumaro was created in 1969 for the National Anime Festival. Their motif is a cocoon because silkworm cocoons are used to make silk, which is then used to make cloth, for example tangotime, nishijin ori, or kyouyuu zenn. The design was chosen by the public from over 2,000 candidates from Japan and other countries.

== Activities ==
On November 1, 2010, Mayumaro entered the year's kanji ceremony with Tawawachan.
