= Costumed performer =

Meetable or cartoon costumed performers

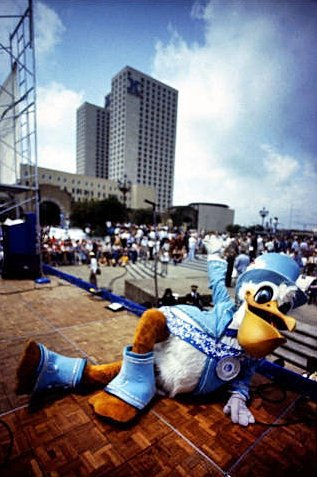
Seymore D. Fair - 1984 Louisiana World Exposition Character Mascot.

A costumed performer or suit performer wears a costume that usually (but not always) covers the performer's face, typically to represent a non-human character such as a mascot or cartoon character. These include theme park "walk-around" or "meetable" characters, the mascots of corporations, schools, or sports teams, and novelty act performers. Some costumes cover the performer's face, especially those in theme parks.

Examples include sports mascots and performances as fantasy characters on children's television and in theme parks. Problems in suit performance include intense physical exertion, claustrophobia, and hyperthermia.

== In theme parks, international fairs, and festivals ==
Costumed performers are a major feature of amusement parks like Disney Experiences, Universal Destinations & Experiences, SeaWorld, Six Flags, and Legoland, as well as many other large or small theme parks and fairs.

Costumed performers are intended to add to the fantasy experience by enabling visitors to encounter and interact with fictional characters, such as mascots for a company or organization. The characters are portrayed by employees in costume. Some of the costumes merely consist of clothing and makeup, while those for non-human characters generally conceal the performer entirely and include a full bodysuit, a head, and sometimes accessories or clothing on top of that. A longstanding policy in most well known theme parks stipulates that for the first category of characters, where the performer's face remains visible (usually "face" characters) speaking is allowed (usually on the basis of scripts carefully prepared in advance), while the second category of characters, where the face is covered (sometimes called "fur" characters) are not allowed to speak, although are allowed to make noises, and tend to communicate through pantomime.

A common occurrence, often involving "fur" characters, is that young children can feel particularly intimidated by the size of the costume. They can also be intimidated by the quick movements of more energetic characters, or by the character approaching them directly, so performers frequently slow down or kneel down when interacting with smaller children to let the child approach them.

For human characters who can interact by speaking to visitors, detailed scripts are prepared covering a variety of questions regularly asked by visitors, especially young children who have difficulty distinguishing between reality and fantasy. Performers cast in those roles are required to memorize and rehearse those scripts as part of their training, so they can learn their characters' backstories by heart and consistently respond in character to visitors.

At theme parks, particularly at busier ones, popular costumed performers are usually accompanied by one or more assistants (also called "handlers" or "spotters") in regular park uniforms, who handle customer service, security, and crowd control. This minimizes the necessity for performers to break character to deal with those kinds of issues. When a performer needs a break, they simply give a prearranged signal, and their handler may then assure patrons the character will be back momentarily, before guiding them back to a lounge or rest area for them to recuperate.

All theme park operators that present costumed performers enforce strict character performance regulations so that performers are never seen out of character by visitors. In the case of more elaborate costumes, they are never seen "with their head off". A related rule is that performers costumed as the same character (often so that the character in question is never absent for too long) are supposed to avoid being seen side by side by the public.

== In Japan ==
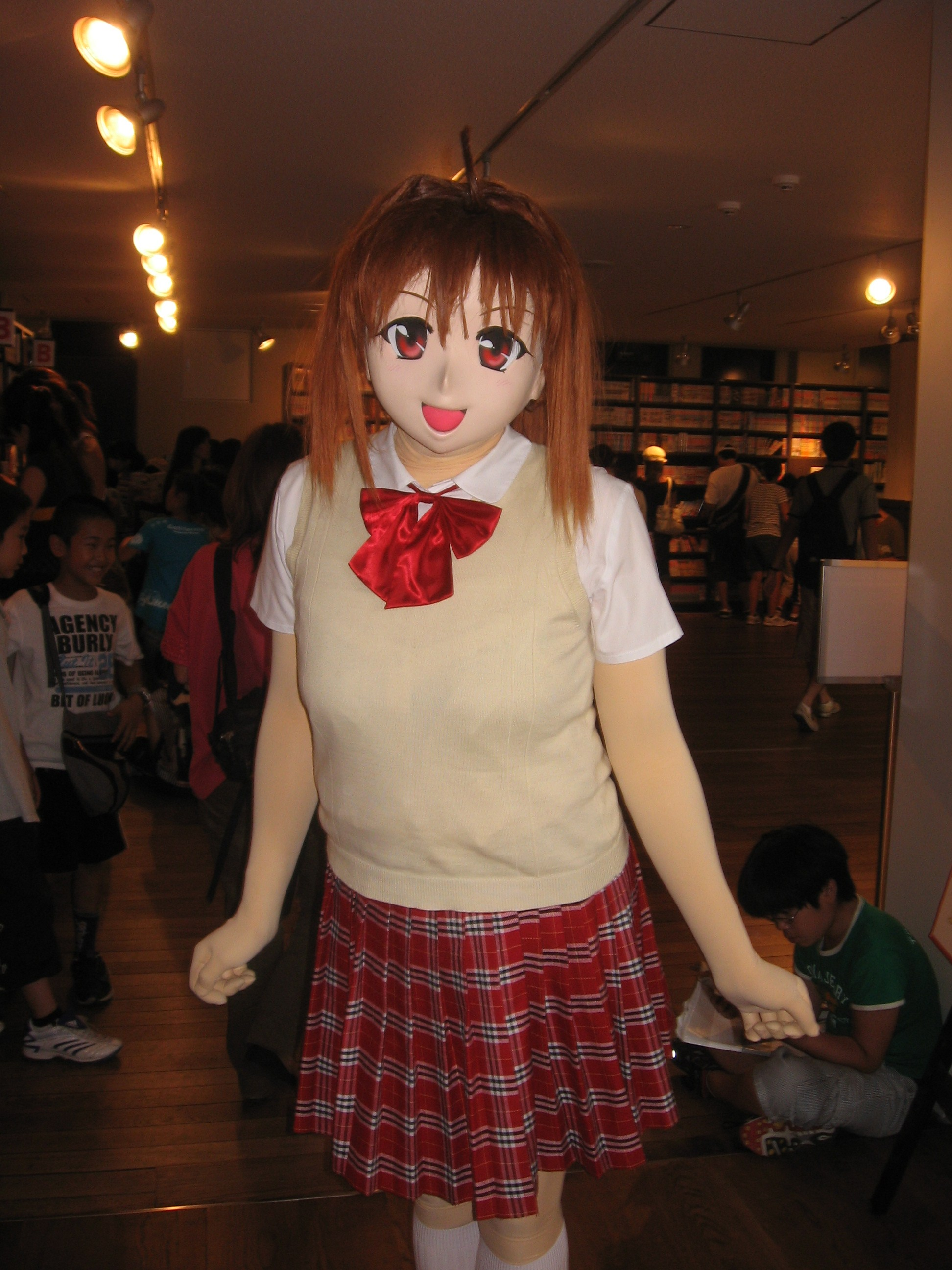
A "doller" at the 2008 Kyoto International Manga Summit

The Japanese name for costumed performers is kigurumi (着ぐるみ). The name comes from the Japanese verb kiru (着る, to wear) and noun nuigurumi (ぬいぐるみ, stuffed toy). Japan's kawaii aesthetic means that mascots are commonly used for promotional purposes. These mascots are often constructed with an appearance that is more chibi than Western mascots, with a massive head that encompasses the performer's entire upper body and the arms low on the body. Other mascots more greatly resemble anime characters.

=== Animegao ===
Animegao (アニメ顔; anime face) is a type of kigurumi used to portray anime or cartoon characters. The face of the performer is fully covered with a stylized mask, and clothing similar to the character's typical attire is used. Animegao costumes are used both in professional stage shows and by cosplayers, sometimes called "dollers", who make custom masks of various characters. It is still a very minor part of the cosplay scene in Japan, though throughout the mid-2000s, it began attracting attention in other countries, including the United States, Canada, and various European states.

== On television ==
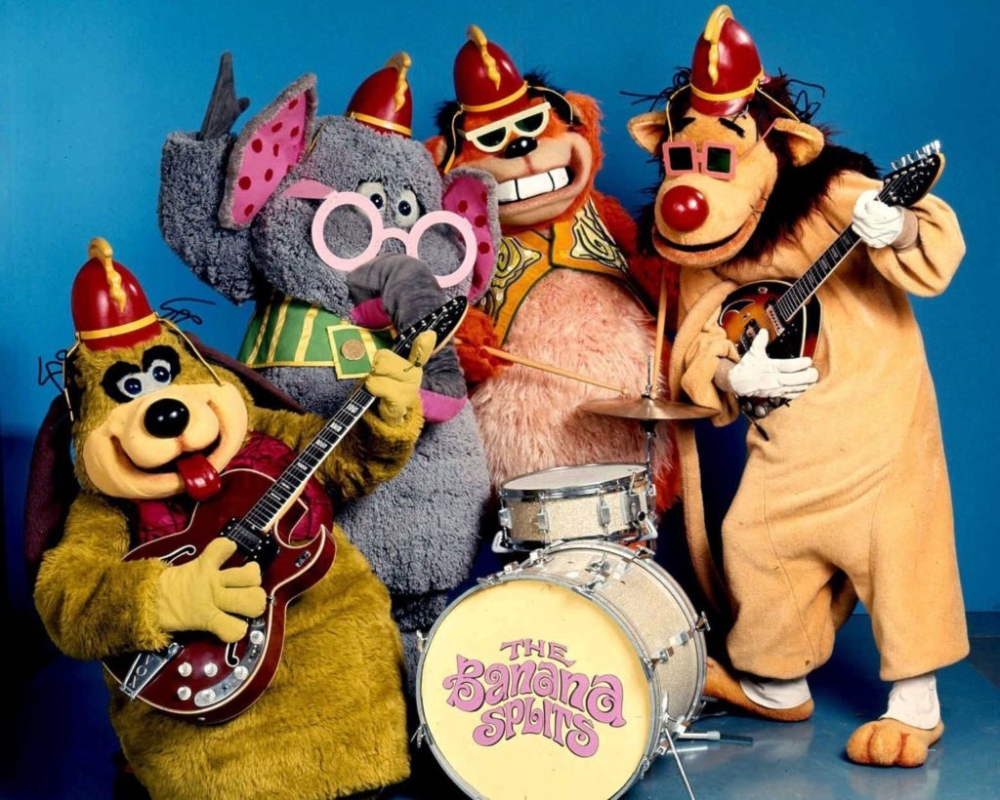
The Banana Splits was a popular children's series using costumed animals in the late 1960's.

Some of the best known programmes featuring a costumed performer puppet include Big Bird of Sesame Street, Barney from Barney & Friends, and Bear of Bear in the Big Blue House. Less complicated costumed characters include Harry from Hip Hop Harry, the Gabba Gang from Yo Gabba Gabba!, the Polkaroo from Polka Dot Door, Wan Wan from Inai Inai Baa!, Niko Niko Pun, Galapico Pu and Mack & Moxy.

Older examples include New Zoo Revue, H.R. Pufnstuf, The Banana Splits, Cucumber, Welcome to Pooh Corner, and British series Gophers!.

== Unauthorised costume characters ==
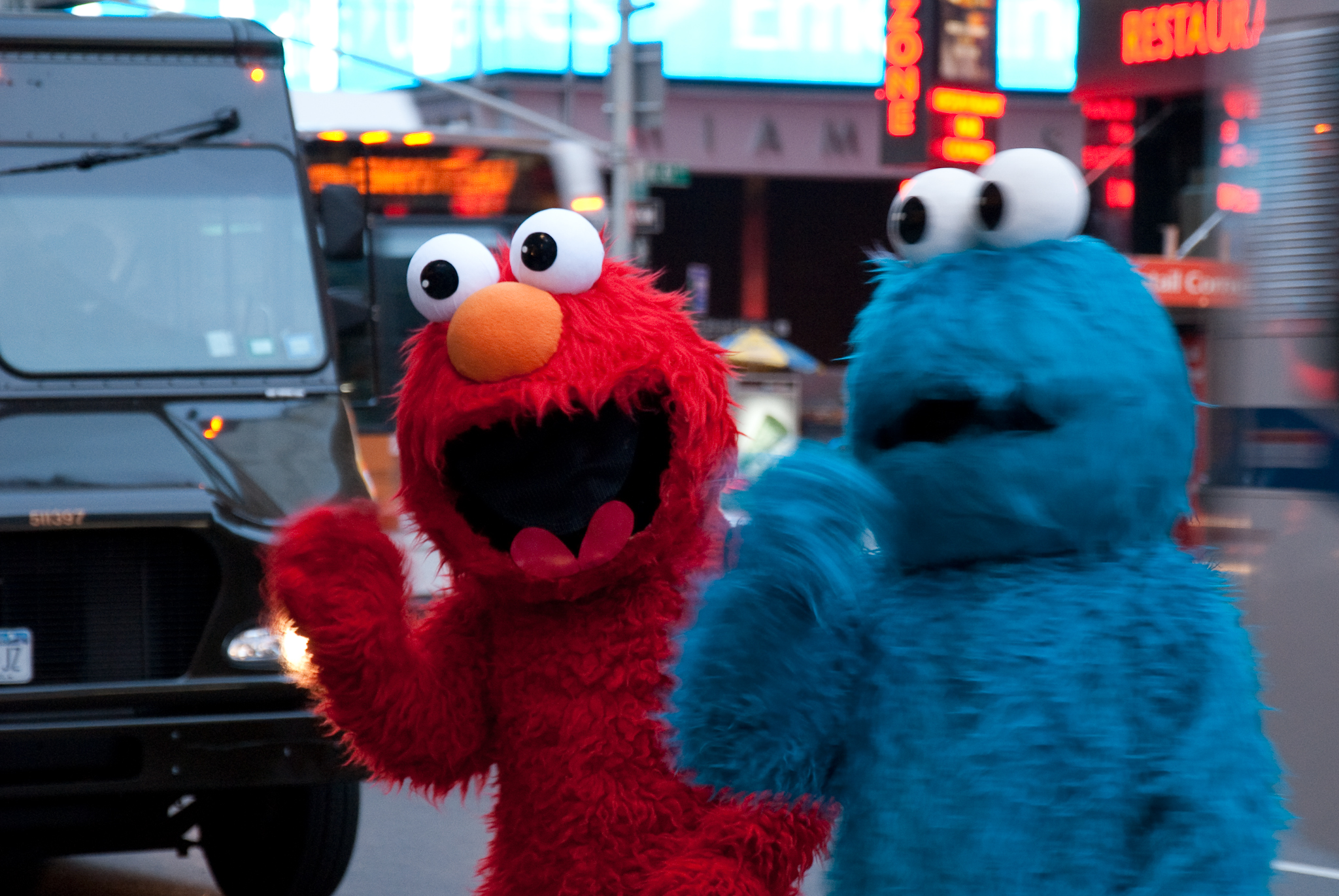
Unauthorised Elmo and Cookie Monster performers at Times Square.

In recent years, amateur performers wearing unauthorised, counterfeit costumes of various pop-culture characters have appeared in popular tourist destinations such as Hollywood Boulevard and Times Square. They usually pose for photos and collect (or, often, extort) tips from tourists. The 2007 documentary film Confessions of a Superhero focuses on costumed "superheroes" on the Hollywood Walk of Fame. Because they are not regulated or authorised, there have been many controversies and arrests involving costumed performers in Times Square.

== Industry ==
The mascot industry is estimated at $5-million a year. Toronto, Canada, is one of the hubs in the industry, with six major firms headquartered out of the city. Knock-off costumes are commonly fabricated in Peru, where they are called botargas, as well as other South American countries and certain East Asian countries.

== See also ==
- Cosplay
- Creature suit
- Fursuit
- Mascot
