= Mary Wells discography =

- Studio albums: 13
- Live albums: 1
- Compilation albums: 2
- Singles: 44

This is a full discography of albums and singles released by Motown singer Mary Wells during a 30-year career that spanned a repertoire of doo-wop, R&B, pop, soul, disco and dance. Throughout her career, she released a total of sixteen albums and twenty-seven singles that charted between 1960 and 1982. Among the singles, twelve of them reached the Top 40 with four reaching the top ten and one hitting number-one. On the R&B charts, eighteen in total reached the top 40, thirteen reached the top ten and three reached the number-one spot.

== Albums ==
| Year | Title | Peaks | Label |
| Year | Title | US | Label |
|---|---|---|---|
| 1961 | Bye Bye Baby I Don't Want to Take a Chance | ― | Motown |
| 1962 | The One Who Really Loves You | ― | Motown |
| 1963 | Two Lovers and Other Great Hits | 49 | Motown |
| 1963 | Recorded Live On Stage | ― | Motown |
| 1964 | Together (with Marvin Gaye) | 42 | Motown |
| 1964 | Greatest Hits | 18 | Motown |
| 1964 | Mary Wells Sings My Guy | 111 | Motown |
| 1965 | Mary Wells | 145 | 20th Century |
| 1965 | Love Songs to the Beatles | ― | 20th Century |
| 1966 | The Two Sides of Mary Wells | ― | Atco |
| 1966 | Vintage Stock | ― | Motown |
| 1968 | Servin' Up Some Soul | ― | Jubilee |
| 1981 | In and Out of Love | ― | Epic/CBS |
| 1982 | Easy Touch | ― | 51 West/CBS |
| 1983 | The Old, The New & The Best of Mary Wells | ― | Allegiance |
| 1990 | Keeping My Mind on Love | ― | Motorcity |
"—" denotes releases that did not chart.

== Singles ==
=== Motown (1960–1964) ===
All songs were released under the Motown label.

| Year | Single (A-side, B-side) Both sides from same album except where indicated | Peak chart positions | | | Certifications | Album |
| Year | Single (A-side, B-side) Both sides from same album except where indicated | US | US R&B | UK | Certifications | Album |
|---|---|---|---|---|---|---|
| 1960 | "Bye Bye Baby" b/w "Please Forgive Me" | 45 | 8 | — | | Bye Bye Baby |
| 1961 | "I Don't Want to Take a Chance" b/w "I'm So Sorry" | 33 | 9 | — | | Bye Bye Baby |
| 1961 | "Strange Love" b/w "Come to Me" (from Bye Bye Baby) | — | — | — | | The One Who Really Loves You |
| 1962 | "The One Who Really Loves You" b/w "I'm Gonna Stay" (from Bye Bye Baby) | 8 | 2 | — | | The One Who Really Loves You |
| 1962 | "You Beat Me to the Punch" b/w "Old Love (Let's Try It Again)" (from Greatest Hits) | 9 | 1 | — | | The One Who Really Loves You |
| 1962 | "Two Lovers" b/w "Operator" | 7 | 1 | — | | Two Lovers |
| 1963 | "Laughing Boy" / "Two Wrongs Don't Make a Right" (from The One Who Really Loves You) | 15; 100 | 6 | — | | Two Lovers |
| 1963 | "Your Old Standby" b/w "What Love Has Joined Together" | 40 | 8 | — | | Greatest Hits |
| 1963 | "You Lost the Sweetest Boy" / "What's Easy for Two Is So Hard for One" | 22; 29 | 10; 8 | — | | Greatest Hits |
| 1964 | "My Guy" b/w "Oh Little Boy (What Did You Do to Me)" (from Greatest Hits) | 1 | 1 | 5 | BPI: Silver | Mary Wells Sings "My Guy" |
| 1964 | "Once Upon a Time" / "What's the Matter with You Baby"; Both sides with Marvin Gaye | 19; 17 | 3; 2 | 50 | | Together (Marvin Gaye & Mary Wells) |
| 1964 | "When I'm Gone" b/w "Guarantee for a Lifetime"; Canceled | — | — | — | | Vintage Stock |
| 1964 | "Whisper You Love Me Boy" b/w "I'll Be Available"; Canceled | — | — | — | | Mary Wells Sings "My Guy" |
| 1972 | "My Guy" b/w "What's Easy for Two Is So Hard for One" (from Greatest Hits) (reissue) | — | — | 14 | | Mary Wells Sings "My Guy" |
"—" denotes releases that did not chart or were not released in that territory.

=== 20th Century Fox (1965) ===
The following list are singles released on 20th Century Fox.

| Year | Single (A-side, B-side) Both sides from same album except where indicated | Peak chart positions | | Album |
| Year | Single (A-side, B-side) Both sides from same album except where indicated | US | US R&B | Album |
|---|---|---|---|---|
| 1964 | "Ain't It the Truth" / "Stop Takin' Me for Granted" | 45; 88 | 6 | Mary Wells |
| 1964 | "Use Your Head" b/w "Everlovin' Boy" | 34 | 13 | Mary Wells |
| 1965 | "Never, Never Leave Me" / "Why Don't You Let Yourself Go" | 54; 107 | 15 | Mary Wells |
| 1965 | "He's a Lover" b/w "I'm Learnin'" (Non-album track) | 74 | — | Mary Wells |
| 1965 | "Me Without You" b/w "I'm Sorry" | 95 | — | Non-album tracks |
| 1965 | "I Should Have Known Better" b/w "Please Please Me" | — | — | Love Songs to The Beatles |
"—" denotes releases that did not chart or were not released in that territory.

=== Atco (1965–1967) ===
The following list are singles released on Atco.

| Year | Single (A-side, B-side) Both sides from same album except where indicated | Peak chart positions | | Album |
| Year | Single (A-side, B-side) Both sides from same album except where indicated | US | US R&B | Album |
|---|---|---|---|---|
| 1965 | "Dear Lover" / "Can't You See (You're Losing Me)" (Non-album track) | 51; 94 | 6 | The Two Sides of Mary Wells |
| 1966 | "Such a Sweet Thing" b/w "Keep Me in Suspense" | 99 | — | Non-album tracks |
| 1966 | "Fancy Free" b/w "Me and My Baby" | — | — | Non-album tracks |
| 1967 | "(Hey You) Set My Soul on Fire" b/w "Coming Home" | 122 | — | Non-album tracks |
"—" denotes releases that did not chart or were not released in that territory.

=== Jubilee (1968–1971) ===
The following list are singles released on Jubilee.

| Year | Single (A-side, B-side) Both sides from same album except where indicated | Peak chart positions | | Album |
| Year | Single (A-side, B-side) Both sides from same album except where indicated | US | US R&B | Album |
|---|---|---|---|---|
| 1968 | "The Doctor" b/w "Two Lovers' History" | 65 | 22 | Servin' Up Some Soul |
| 1968 | "Can't Get Away from Your Love" b/w "A Woman in Love" | — | — | Servin' Up Some Soul |
| 1968 | "Don't Look Back" b/w "500 Miles" | — | — | Servin' Up Some Soul |
| 1969 | "Never Give a Man the World" b/w "Mind Reader" | — | 38 | Non-album tracks |
| 1970 | "Dig the Way I Feel" b/w "Love-Shooting Bandit" | 115 | 35 | Non-album tracks |
| 1970 | "Sweet Love" b/w "It Must Be" | — | — | Non-album tracks |
| 1971 | "Mr. Tough" b/w "Never Give a Man the World" | — | — | Non-album tracks |
"—" denotes releases that did not chart or were not released in that territory.

=== Reprise (1971; 1974) ===
The following list are singles released on Reprise.

| Year | Single (A-side, B-side) Both sides from same album except where indicated | Peak chart positions | Album |
| Year | Single (A-side, B-side) Both sides from same album except where indicated | US R&B | Album |
|---|---|---|---|
| 1971 | "I Found What I Wanted" b/w "I See a Future in You" | — | Non-album tracks |
| 1974 | "If You Can't Give Her Love (Give Her Up)" b/w "Cancel My Subscription" | 95 | Non-album tracks |
"—" denotes releases that did not chart or were not released in that territory.

=== Epic (1981) ===
The following list are singles released on Epic.

| Year | Single (A-side, B-side) Both sides from same album except where indicated | Peak chart positions | | Album |
| Year | Single (A-side, B-side) Both sides from same album except where indicated | US R&B | US Dance | Album |
|---|---|---|---|---|
| 1981 | "Gigolo" b/w "Let's Mix It Up" | 69 | 13 | In and Out of Love |
| 1981 | "These Arms" b/w "Spend the Nights with Me" | — | — | In and Out of Love |
"—" denotes releases that did not chart or were not released in that territory.

=== Allegiance (1983) ===
| Year | Single (A-side, B-side) Both sides from same album except where indicated | Album |
|---|---|---|
| 1983 | "My Guy" (Rerecording) b/w Instrumental version of A-side (Non-album track) | The Old, The New & The Best of Mary Wells |

=== Nightmare (1987–1989) ===
| Year | Single (A-side, B-side) Both sides from same album except where indicated | Album |
|---|---|---|
| 1987 | "Don't Burn Your Bridges" b/w Nightmare Dub Mix of A-side (Non-album track) | Keeping My Mind on Love |
| 1989 | "You're the Answer to My Dreams" b/w Motor-Town Dub Mix version of A-side (Non-album track) | Keeping My Mind on Love |

=== Tamla Motown UK releases ===
Including catalogue numbers.

- TML11006 My Baby Just Cares for Me LP
- TML11032 Greatest Hits LP
- STMS5057 Sings My Guy LP
- STMS5093 Greatest Hits LP
- TMG820 "My Guy" / "You Lost the Sweetest Boy" / "Two Lovers" single
- TME2007 Mary Wells EP
