= Motown singles discography =

Singles released by American record label

This is a discography for singles released by the American rhythm and blues record label Motown as well as its subsidiaries and imprints.

Overview of Motown single releases
Released	Song title		Artist	Label and number	Country
Released	A Side	B Side	Artist	Label and number	Country
January 1959	"Come to Me" (Berry Gordy, Jr. and Marv Johnson)	"Whisper" (Gordy and Johnson)	Marv Johnson	Tamla 101	United States
January 1959	"I Can't Concentrate" (Wade Jones)	"Insane" (Gordy and William Robinson)	Wade Jones	Rayber RA 1001	United States
February 1959	"Merry-Go-Round"	"It Moves Me"	Eddie Holland	Tamla 102	United States
April 1959	"Let's Rock"	"Do the Very Best You Can"	Barrett Strong	Tamla MT 54022	United States
April 1959	"Solid Sender"	"I'll Never Love Again"	Chico Leverett	Tamla MT 54024	United States
June 1959	"Snake Walk (Part 1)"	"Snake Walk (Part 2)"	The Swinging Tigers	Tamla MT 54024 [sic]	United States
June 1959	"It"	"Don't Say Bye Bye"	Ron & Bill	Tamla 54025	United States
July 1959	"Going to the Hop"	"Motor City"	The Satintones	Tamla 54026	United States
August 1959	"Money (That's What I Want)"	"Oh I Apologize"	Barrett Strong	Tamla 54027	United States
August 1959	"Ich-i-bon #1"	"Cool and Crazy"	Nick & the Jaguars	Tamla 5501	United States
September 1959	"Bad Girl"	"I Love Your Baby"	The Miracles	Motown TLX 2207	United States
September 1959	"The Feeling Is So Fine"	"(You Can) Depend on Me"	The Miracles	Tamla T 54028	United States
October 1959	"My Beloved"	"Sugar Daddy"	The Satintones	Motown M-1000	United States
October 1959	"You Never Miss a Good Thing"	"Hold Me Tight" / "Gotta Have Your Lovin'"	Eugene Remus	Motown M-1001	United States
November 1959	"The Hunch"	"Hot Cross Buns"	Paul Gayten	London American HLM 8998	United Kingdom
January 1960	"Way Over There"	"(You Can) Depend on Me" (second version)	The Miracles	Tamla T-54028 [sic]	United States
April 1960	"Money (That's What I Want)"	"Oh I Apologize"	Barrett Strong	London American HLU 9088	United Kingdom
July 1960	"Yes, No, Maybe So"	"You Knows What to Do"	Barrett Strong	Tamla T-54029	United States
August 1960	"Custer's Last Man"	"Shimmy Gully"	Popcorn and the Mohawks	Motown M-1002	United States
August 1960	"Who Wouldn't Love a Man Like That"	"You Made a Fool Out of Me"	Mable John	Tamla T-54031	United States
August 1960	"Whirlwind"	"I'm Gonna Cry (If You Quit Me)"	Barrett Strong	Tamla T-54033	United States
September 1960	"Bye Bye Baby"	"Please Forgive Me"	Mary Wells	Motown M-1003	United States
September 1960	"What Makes You Love Him"	"That Child Is Really Wild"	Singin' Sammy Ward	Tamla T-54030	United States
September 1960	"Who's the Fool"	"That Child Is Really Wild"	Singin' Sammy Ward	Tamla T-54030 (second pressing)	United States
September 1960	"Shop Around"	"Who's Lovin' You"	The Miracles	Tamla T-54034	United States
October 1960	"True Love (That's Love)"	"It's You"	Herman Griffin	Tamla T-54032	United States
November 1960	"Oh Lover"	"That's Why I Love You So Much"	Sherri Taylor & Singin' Sammy Ward	Motown M-1004	United States
January 1961	"I've Got a Notion"	"We Really Love Each Other"	Henry Lumpkin	Motown M-1005	United States
January 1961	"Don't Feel Sorry for Me"	"Heart"	Jimmy Ruffin	Miracle MIR-1	United States
February 1961	"Don't Let Him Shop Around"	"A New Girl"	Debbie Dean	Motown M-1007	United States
February 1961	"Ain't It Baby"	"The Only One I Love"	The Miracles	Tamla T-54036	United States
February 1961	"Money and Me"	"You've Got What It Takes"	Barrett Strong	Tamla T-54035	United States
February 1961	"When I Needed You"	"Continental Strut"	Little Iva & Her Band	Miracle MIR-2	United States
February 1961	"Whole Lotta' Woman"	"Come On and Be Mine"	The Contours	Motown M-1008	United States
February 1961	"Shop Around"	"Who's Lovin' You"	The Miracles	London American HL 9276	United Kingdom
March 1961	"I Want a Guy"	"Never Again"	The Supremes	Tamla T-54038	United States
March 1961	"He Lifted Me"	"Behold the Saints of God"	The Gospel Stars	Tamla T 54037	United States
March 1961	"Poor Sam Jones"	"They Rode Through the Valley"	Mickey Woods	Tamla T-54039	United States
April 1961	"Money (That's What I Want)"	"I'll Still Be Around"	Richard Wylie and His Band	Motown M-1009	United States
April 1961	"Tomorrow and Always"	"A Love That Can Never Be"	The Satintones	Motown M-1006	United States
May 1961	"Blibberin' Blabbin' Blues"	"Don't Say Bye Bye"	Gino Parks	Miracle MIR-3	United States
May 1961	"Angel"	"A Love That Can Never Be"	The Satintones	Motown M-1006 (third pressing)	United States
May 1961	"(I'm Afraid) The Masquerade Is Over"	"Witchcraft"	Marvin Gaye	Tamla (no catalogue number)	United States
May 1961	"Let Your Conscience Be Your Guide"	"Never Let You Go (Sha Lu Bop)"	Marvin Gaye	Tamla T-54041	United States
June 1961	"I Don't Want to Take a Chance"	"I'm So Sorry"	Mary Wells	Motown M-1011	United States
June 1961	"Rosa Lee (Stay Off the Bell)"	"Shoo-Doo"	Andre Williams	Miracle MIR-4	United States
June 1961	"Misery"	"Two Wrongs Don't Make a Right"	Barrett Strong	Tamla T 54043	United States
June 1961	"Broken Hearted"	"Mighty Good Lovin'"	The Miracles	Tamla T-54044	United States
June 1961	"No Love"	"Looking for a Man"	Mable John	Tamla T-54040	United States
June 1961	"Same Thing"	"That's No Lie"	Gino Parks	Tamla T 54042	United States
June 1961	"I Know How It Feels"	"My Kind of Love"	The Satintones	Motown M-1010	United States
June 1961	"Buttered Popcorn"	"Who's Lovin' You"	The Supremes	Tamla T-54045	United States
June 1961	"Ain't It Baby"	"The Only One I Love"	The Miracles	London American HL 9366	United Kingdom
July 1961	"Oh Mother of Mine"	"Romance Without Finance"	The Temptations	Miracle M5	United States
August 1961	"I Am Bound"	"Precious Memories"	The Golden Harmoneers	Motown M-1015	United States
August 1961	"Please Mr. Postman"	"So Long Baby"	The Marvelettes	Tamla 54046	United States
August 1961	"The Stretch"	"Funny"	The Contours	Motown M1012	United States
August 1961	"Itsy Bity Pity Love"	"But I'm Afraid"	Debbie Dean	Motown M1014	United States
September 1961	"They Shall Be Mine"	"Jesus Loves"	Rev. Columbus Mann	Tamla 54047	United States
September 1961	"Someone to Call My Own"	"You're My Desire"	The Equadors	Miracle MIR-7	United States
September 1961	"Love Me"	"Darling Tonight"	Pete Hartfield	Miracle MIR8	United States
September 1961	"Everybody's Gotta Pay Some Dues"	"I Can't Believe"	The Miracles	Tamla 54048	United States
October 1961	"Angel in Blue"	"Blue Cinderella"	Joel Sebastian	Miracle MIR 9	United States
October 1961	"Strange Love"	"Come to Me"	Mary Wells	Motown M1016	United States
October 1961	"The Day Will Come"	"Just for You"	Freddie Gorman	Miracle MIR 11	United States
October 1961	"Have I the Right"	"Real Good Lovin'"	Popcorn & the Mohawks	Motown M1019	United States
October 1961	"Zing Went the Strings of My Heart"	"Faded Letter"	The Satintones	Motown M1020	United States
October 1961	"Jamie"	"Take a Chance on Me"	Eddie Holland	Motown M1021	United States
October 1961	"Greetings (This Is Uncle Sam)"	"Take a Chance"	The Valadiers	Miracle MIR-6	United States
November 1961	"Actions Speak Louder Than Words"	"Take Me"	Mable John	Tamla 54050	United States
November 1961	"What Makes You Love Him" (version two)	"Don't Take It Away"	Sammy Ward	Tamla 54049	United States
November 1961	"Check Yourself"	"Your Wonderful Love"	The Temptations	Miracle MIR 12	United States
November 1961	"Small Sad Sam"	"Tie Me Tight"	Bob Kayli	Tamla 54051	United States
November 1961	"Whose Heart (Are You Gonna Break Now)"	"I'll Call You"	Don McKenzie	Miracle MIR-10	United States
November 1961	"Xmas Twist"	"White House Twist"	The Twistin' Kings	Motown M1022	United States
December 1961	"Please Mr. Kennedy"	"(They Call Me) Cupid"	Mickey Woods	Tamla 54052	United States
December 1961	"Twistin' Postman"	"I Want a Guy"	The Marvelettes	Tamla T 54054	United States
December 1961	"What's So Good About Goodbye"	"I've Been Good to You"	The Miracles	Tamla 54053	United States
December 1961	"Congo, Pt. 1"	"Congo, Pt. 2"	The Twistin' Kings	Motown M 1023	United States
December 1961	"Please Mr. Postman"	"So Long Baby"	The Marvelettes	Fontana H 355	United Kingdom
January 1962	"Mr. Sandman"	"I'm Yours, You're Mine"	Marvin Gaye	Tamla T 54055	United States
January 1962	"What Is a Man (Without a Woman)"	"Don't Leave Me"	Henry Lumpkin	Motown M 1013	United States
February 1962	"The One Who Really Loves You"	"I'm Gonna Stay"	Mary Wells	Motown M 1024	United States
February 1962	"Your Baby's Back"	"Request of a Fool"	The Downbeats	Tamla T 54056	United States
March 1962	"Big Joe Moe"	"Everybody Knew It but Me"	Singin' Sammy Ward	Tamla T 54057	United States
March 1962	"Everybody's Talking About My Baby"	"I Cried All Night"	Debbie Dean	Motown M 1025	United States
March 1962	"I Out-Duked the Duke"	"Baby I Need You"	Little Oris	Tamla T 50458	United States
March 1962	"(You're My) Dream Come True"	"Isn't She Pretty"	The Temptations	Gordy 7001	United States
March 1962	"What's So Good About Goodbye"	"I've Been Good to You"	The Miracles	Fontana H 384	United Kingdom
March 1962	"Twistin' Postman"	"I Want a Guy"	The Marvelettes	Fontana H 386	United Kingdom
March 1962	"Jamie"	"Take a Chance on Me"	Eddie Holland	Fontana H 387	United Kingdom
April 1962	"You Deserve What You Got"	"Last Night I Had a Vision"	Eddie Holland	Motown M 1026	United States
April 1962	"I'll Try Something New"	"You Never Miss a Good Thing"	The Miracles	Tamla T 54059	United States
April 1962	"Playboy"	"All the Love I've Got"	The Marvelettes	Tamla T 54060	United States
April 1962	"Come into My Palace"	"Trying to Make It"	Lee & the Leopards	Gordy G 7002	United States
May 1962	"If Cleopatra Took a Chance"	"What About Me"	Eddie Holland	Motown M 1030	United States
May 1962	"Soldier's Plea"	"Taking My Time"	Marvin Gaye	Tamla T 54063	United States
May 1962	"Your Heart Belongs to Me"	"(He's) Seventeen"	The Supremes	Motown M 1027(two pressings)	United States
May 1962	"Exodus"	"I Remember You"	Hank & Carol Diamond	Workshop Jazz 2001	United States
May 1962	"Opus No. 3"	"March Lightly"	Earl Washington All-Stars	Workshop Jazz 2002	United States
May 1962	"Because I Love Her"	"While I'm Away"	The Valadiers	Gordy G 7003	United States
May 1962	"I Call It Pretty Music but the Old People Call It the Blues (Part 1)"	"I Call It Pretty Music but the Old People Call It the Blues (Part 2)"	Little Stevie Wonder	Tamla T 54061	United States
June 1962	"Sleep (Little One)"	"Uptight"	Herman Griffin	Motown M 1028	United States
June 1962	"Dearest One"	"Fortune Teller (Tell Me)"	Lamont Dozier	Mel-o-dy 102	United States
June 1962	"Same Old Story"	"I'll Cry a Million Tears"	Mickey McCullers	Tamla T 54064	United States
June 1962	"Do You Love Me"	"Move Mr. Man"	The Contours	Gordy G 7005	United States
June 1962	"Back in My Arms"	"Is It True (What They Say About You)"	Hattie Littles	Gordy G 7004 (unreleased)	United States
July 1962	"Fire"	"For This I Thank You"	Gino Parks	Tamla T 54066	United States
July 1962	"I Found Myself a Brand New Baby"	"It's Too Bad"	Mike and the Modifiers	Gordy G 7006	United States
July 1962	"Mo Jo Hanna"	"Break Down and Sing"	Henry Lumpkin	Motown M 1029	United States
July 1962	"Beechwood 4-5789"	"Someday, Someway"	The Marvelettes	Tamla T 54065	United States
July 1962	"You Beat Me to the Punch"	"Old Love (Let's Try It Again)"	Mary Wells	Motown M 1032	United States
July 1962	"This Is Our Night"	"You're My Inspiration"	The Creations	Mel-o-dy M 101	United States
July 1962	"Camel Walk"	"It's Gonna Be Hard Times"	Saundra Mallett & the Vandellas	Tamla T 54067	United States
July 1962	"Stubborn Kind of Fellow"	"It Hurt Me Too"	Marvin Gaye	Tamla T 54068	United States
July 1962	"That's What He Is to Me"	"Pilgrim of Sorrow"	The Wright Specials	Divinity 99004	United States
July 1962	"Way Over There"	"If Your Mother Only Knew"	The Miracles	Tamla T 54069	United States
August 1962	"If It's Love (It's Alright)"	"It's Not Too Late"	Eddie Holland	Motown M 1031	United States
August 1962	"Someday Pretty Baby"	"Part Time Love"	Singin' Sammy Ward	Tamla T 54071	United States
September 1962	"Your Love Is Wonderful"	"Here You Come"	Hattie Littles	Gordy G 7007	United States
September 1962	"Trouble Lover"	"Show Me Some Sign"	The Charters	Mel-o-dy M 104	United States
September 1962	"I'll Have to Let Him Go"	"My Baby Won't Come Back"	Martha and the Vandellas	Gordy G 7011	United States
September 1962	"Mind over Matter (I'm Gonna Make You Mine)"	"I'll Love You Till I Die"	The Pirates [The Temptations]	Mel-o-dy M-105	United States
September 1962	"You Beat Me to the Punch"	"Old Love (Let's Try It Again)"	Mary Wells	Oriole CBA 1762	United Kingdom
September 1962	"Do You Love Me"	"Move Mr. Man"	The Contours	Oriole CBA 1763	United Kingdom
September 1962	"Beechwood 4-5789"	"Someday, Someway"	The Marvelettes	Oriole CBA 1764	United Kingdom
October 1962	"Little Water Boy"	"La La La La La"	Little Stevie Wonder & Clarence Paul	Tamla T 54070	United States
October 1962	"Strange I Know"	"Too Strong to Be Strung Along"	The Marvelettes	Tamla T 54072	United States
October 1962	"You'll Never Cherish a Love So True ('Til You Lose It)"	"There He Is (at My Door)"	The Vells	Mel-o-dy M 103	United States
October 1962	"Paradise"	"Slow Down Heart"	The Temptations	Gordy G 7010	United States
October 1962	"Two Lovers"	"Operator"	Mary Wells	Motown M 1035	United States
October 1962	"I Found Myself a Brand New Baby"	"It's Too Bad"	Mike & the Modifiers	Oriole CBA 1775	United Kingdom
November 1962	"Let Me Go the Right Way"	"Time Changes Things"	The Supremes	Motown M 1034	United States
November 1962	"Hold On Pearl"	"Toodle Loo"	Bob Kayli	Gordy G 7008	United States
November 1962	"You've Really Got a Hold on Me"	"Happy Landing"	The Miracles	Tamla T-54073	United States
November 1962	"Shake Sherry"	"You Better Get in Line"	The Contours	Gordy G 7012	United States
December 1962	"Camel Walk"	"The Chaperone"	LaBrenda Ben & the Beljeans	Gordy G 7009	United States
December 1962	"Darling, I Hum Our Song"	"Just a Few More Days"	Eddie Holland	Motown M 1036	United States
December 1962	"Hitch Hike"	"Hello There Angel"	Marvin Gaye	Tamla T 54075	United States
December 1962	"Contract on Love"	"Sunset"	Little Stevie Wonder	Tamla T 54074	United States
January 1963	"I Found a Girl"	"You'll Be Sorry Someday"	The Valadiers	Gordy G 7013	United States
January 1963	"Good-By Cruel Love"	"Envious"	Linda Griner	Motown M 1037	United States
January 1963	"I Want to Talk About You"	"So in Love"	Paula Greer	Workshop Jazz 2003 (unreleased)	United States
January 1963	"You've Really Got a Hold on Me"	"Happy Landing"	The Miracles	Oriole CBA 1795	United Kingdom
January 1963	"Two Lovers"	"Operator"	Mary Wells	Oriole CBA 1796	United Kingdom
February 1963	"Laughing Boy"	"Two Wrongs Don't Make a Right"	Mary Wells	Motown M 1039	United States
February 1963	"Sugar Cane Curtain"	"Dingbat Diller"	The Chuck-a-Lucks	Mel-o-dy 106	United States
February 1963	"It Should Have Been Me"	"Love Me All the Way"	Kim Weston	Tamla T 54076	United States
February 1963	"Locking Up My Heart"	"Forever"	The Marvelettes	Tamla T 54077	United States
February 1963	"Come and Get These Memories"	"Jealous Lover"	Martha and the Vandellas	Gordy G 7014	United States
February 1963	"My Heart Can't Take It No More"	"You Bring Back Memories"	The Supremes	Motown M 1040	United States
February 1963	"Late Freight"	"Mellow in Coli"	Dave Hamilton	Workshop Jazz 2004	United States
February 1963	"I'mi See You Later"	"I Did"	Johnny Griffith Trio	Workshop Jazz 2005	United States
February 1963	"Bobbie"	"El Rig"	George Bohannon Quartet	Workshop Jazz 2006	United States
February 1963	"I Did"	"Falling in Love with Love"	Paula Greer	Workshop Jazz 2007	United States
February 1963	"Shake Sherry"	"You Better Get in Line"	The Contours	Oriole CBA 1799	United Kingdom
February 1963	"Stubborn Kind of Fellow"	"It Hurt Me Too"	Marvin Gaye	Oriole CBA 1803	United Kingdom
March 1963	"The Interview (Summit Chanted Meeting)"	"Peaceful"	Bert "Jack" Haney & Bruce "Nikiter" Armstrong	Mel-o-dy 107	United States
March 1963	"My Baby Gave Me Another Chance"	"I'll Make It Up to You Somehow"	Amos Milburn	Motown M 1038	United States
March 1963	"Don't Let Her Be Your Baby"	"It Must Be Love"	The Contours	Gordy G 7016	United States
March 1963	"Oh Freddy"	"It Hurt Me Too"	Connie Van Dyke	Motown M 1041	United States
March 1963	"A Love She Can Count On"	"I Can Take a Hint"	The Miracles	Tamla T 54078	United States
March 1963	"I Want a Love I Can See"	"The Further You Look, the Less You See"	The Temptations	Gordy G 7015	United States
March 1963	"If It's Love (It's Alright)"	"It's Not Too Late"	Eddie Holland	Oriole CBA 1808	United Kingdom
March 1963	"I Found a Girl"	"You'll Be Sorry Someday"	The Valadiers	Oriole CBA 1809	United Kingdom
March 1963	"I'll Have to Let Him Go"	"My Baby Won't Come Back"	Martha and the Vandellas	Oriole CBA 1814	United Kingdom
April 1963	"Pride and Joy"	"One of These Days"	Marvin Gaye	Tamla T 54079	United States
April 1963	"Your Old Standby"	"What Love Has Joined Together"	Mary Wells	Motown M 1042	United States
April 1963	"Baby Shake"	"Brenda"	Eddie Holland	Motown M 1043	United States
April 1963	"Why Go Out of Your Way"	"I'll Go Anywhere"	Billy Merritt	Mel-o-dy 108 (unreleased)	United States
April 1963	"Locking Up My Heart"	"Forever"	The Marvelettes	Oriole CBA 1817	United Kingdom
April 1963	"Come and Get These Memories"	"Jealous Lover"	Martha and the Vandellas	Oriole CBA 1819	United Kingdom
May 1963	"Fingertips (Part 1)"	"Fingertips (Part 2)"	Little Stevie Wonder	Tamla T 54080	United States
May 1963	"First, You've Got to Recognize God"	"I'm Going Home"	The Burnadettes	Divinity 99007	United States
May 1963	"I'm Hooked"	"We're Only Young Once"	Bunny Paul	Gordy G 7017	United States
May 1963	"Going Steady Anniversary"	"Pushing Up Daisies"	The Stylers	Gordy G 7018	United States
May 1963	"Laughing Boy"	"Two Wrongs Don't Make a Right"	Mary Wells	Oriole CBA 1829	United Kingdom
May 1963	"Don't Let Her Be Your Baby"	"It Must Be Love"	The Contours	Oriole CBA 1831	United Kingdom
June 1963	"Ninety-Nine and a Half Won't Do"	"I Won't Go Back"	The Wright Specials	Divinity 99005	United States
June 1963	"Pa (I Need a Car)"	"You Get Ugly"	The Contours	Gordy G 7019	United States
June 1963	"My Daily Prayer"	"I'll Make It Up to You Somehow"	Amos Milburn	Motown M 1046 (unreleased)	United States
June 1963	"A Breathtaking Guy"	"(The Man with the) Rock and Roll Banjo Band"	The Supremes	Motown M 1044	United States
June 1963	"What Goes Up, Must Come Down"	"Come On Home"	Holland–Dozier	Motown M 1045	United States
June 1963	"Who Wouldn't Love a Man like That" (version two)	"Say You'll Never Let Me Go"	Mable John	Tamla T 54081	United States
June 1963	"Farewell My Love"	"May I Have This Dance"	The Temptations	Gordy G 7020	United States
July 1963	"My Daddy Knows Best"	"Tie a String Around Your Finger"	The Marvelettes	Tamla T 54082	United States
July 1963	"Heat Wave"	"A Love Like Yours (Don't Come Knocking Everyday)"	Martha and the Vandellas	Gordy G 7022	United States
July 1963	"Give God a Chance"	"Have You Any Time for Jesus"	The Gospel Stars	Divinity 99006	United States
July 1963	"Mickey's Monkey"	"Whatever Makes You Happy"	The Miracles	Tamla T 54083	United States
July 1963	"There He Goes"	"That's the Reason Why"	The Velvelettes	PG 45-1002	United States
July 1963	"Pride and Joy"	"One of These Days"	Marvin Gaye	Oriole CBA 1846	United Kingdom
July 1963	"Your Old Standby"	"What Love Has Joined Together"	Mary Wells	Oriole CBA 1847	United Kingdom
August 1963	"Back to School Again"	"Pig Knuckles"	The Morrocco Muzik Makers	Motown M 1047	United States
August 1963	"Just Be Yourself"	"I Can't Help It, I Gotta Dance"	LaBrenda Ben	Gordy G 7021	United States
August 1963	"You Lost the Sweetest Boy"	"What's Easy for Two Is So Hard for One"	Mary Wells	Motown M 1048	United States
August 1963	"Fingertips (Part 1)"	"Fingertips (Part 2)"	Little Stevie Wonder	Oriole CBA 1853	United Kingdom
September 1963	"Workout Stevie, Workout"	"Monkey Talk"	Little Stevie Wonder	Tamla T 54086	United States
September 1963	"Can I Get a Witness"	"I'm Crazy 'Bout My Baby"	Marvin Gaye	Tamla T 54087	United States
September 1963	"We Shall Overcome"	"Trouble in This Land"	Liz Lands	Divinity 99008 (unreleased)	United States
September 1963	"Mickey's Monkey"	"Whatever Makes You Happy"	The Miracles	Oriole CBA 1863	United Kingdom
October 1963	"As Long as I Know He's Mine"	"He Won't Be True (Little Girl Blue)"	The Marvelettes	Tamla T 54088	United States
October 1963	"I'm on the Outside Looking In"	"I Couldn't Cry If I Wanted To"	Eddie Holland	Motown M 1049	United States
October 1963	"Just Loving You"	"Another Train Coming"	Kim Weston	Tamla T 54085	United States
October 1963	"Too Hurt to Cry, Too Much in Love to Say Goodbye"	"Come On Home"	The Darnells (The Andantes)	Gordy G 7024	United States
October 1963	"The Big Wheel"	"That Silver Haired Daddy of Mine"	Howard Crockett	Mel-o-dy 109	United States
October 1963	"Forget About Me"	"Devil in His Heart"	Carolyn Crawford	Motown M 1050	United States
October 1963	"When the Lovelight Starts Shining Through His Eyes"	"Standing at the Crossroads of Love"	The Supremes	Motown M 1051	United States
October 1963	"I Gotta Dance to Keep from Crying"	"Such Is Love, Such Is Life"	The Miracles	Tamla T 54089	United States
October 1963	"I've Got That Feeling"	"I Want My Share"	Cornell Blakely	Rich 1801	United States
October 1963	"Heat Wave"	"A Love Like Yours (Don't Come Knocking Everyday)"	Martha and the Vandellas	Stateside SS 228	United Kingdom
November 1963	"Quicksand"	"Darling, I Hum Our Song"	Martha and the Vandellas	Gordy G 7025	United States
November 1963	"The Christmas Song"	"Christmas Everyday"	The Miracles	Tamla T 54084 / EX-009 (unreleased)	United States
November 1963	"Workout Stevie Workout"	"Monkey Talk"	Little Stevie Wonder	Stateside SS 238	United Kingdom
November 1963	"You Lost the Sweetest Boy"	"What's Easy for Two Is So Hard for One"	Mary Wells	Stateside SS 242	United Kingdom
November 1963	"Can I Get a Witness"	"I'm Crazy 'Bout My Baby"	Marvin Gaye	Stateside SS 243	United Kingdom
December 1963	"May What He Lived for Live"	"He's Got the Whole World in His Hand"	Liz Lands	Gordy G 7026	United States
December 1963	"Leaving Here"	"Brenda"	Eddie Holland	Motown M 1052	United States
December 1963	"Stevie"	"(He Is) The Boy of My Dreams"	Patrice Holloway	VIP 25001	United States
January 1964	"Castles in the Sand"	"Thank You (for Loving Me All the Way)"	Little Stevie Wonder	Tamla T 54090	United States
January 1964	"Live Wire"	"Old Love (Let's Try It Again)"	Martha and the Vandellas	Gordy G 7027	United States
January 1964	"Shambles"	"Beautiful Women"	Gene Henslee	Mel-o-dy 110	United States
January 1964	"The Way You Do the Things You Do"	"Just Let Me Know"	The Temptations	Gordy G 7028	United States
January 1964	"If Your Heart Says Yes"	"I'll Cry Tomorrow"	The Serenaders	VIP 25002	United States
January 1964	"He's a Good Guy (Yes He Is)"	"Goddess of Love"	The Marvelettes	Tamla T 54091	United States
January 1964	"How Can We Tell Him"	"Better Late Than Never"	Bobby Breen	Motown M 1053	United States
January 1964	"Quicksand"	"Darling, I Hum Our Song"	Martha and the Vandellas	Stateside SS 250	United Kingdom
January 1964	"As Long as I Know He's Mine"	"Little Girl Blue"	The Marvelettes	Stateside SS 251	United Kingdom
January 1964	"When the Lovelight Starts Shining Through His Eyes"	"Standing at the Crossroads of Love"	The Supremes	Stateside SS 257	United Kingdom
February 1964	"Run, Run, Run"	"I'm Giving You Your Freedom"	The Supremes	Motown M 1054	United States
February 1964	"After the Showers Come Flowers"	"Don't Be a Cry Baby"	Joannie and the Triangles	VIP 25003	United States
February 1964	"(You Can't Let the Boy Overpower) The Man in You"	"Heartbreak Road"	The Miracles	Tamla T 54092	United States
February 1964	"Only You"	"Right Now"	Sammy Turner	Motown M 1055	United States
February 1964	"Give Me a Kiss"	"She's My Baby"	The Hornets	VIP 25004	United States
February 1964	"You're a Wonderful One"	"When I'm Alone I Cry"	Marvin Gaye	Tamla T 54093	United States
February 1964	"Can You Do It"	"I'll Stand by You"	The Contours	Gordy G 7029	United States
February 1964	"Set Me Free"	"Set Me Free"	Lee Alan	Summer Camp ZTSC 94422	United States
February 1964	"My Lady Bug Stay Away from That Beatle"	"Poor Girl"	R. Dean Taylor	VIP 25005 (unreleased)	United States
February 1964	"I Gotta Dance to Keep from Crying"	"Such Is Love, Such Is Life"	The Miracles	Stateside SS 263	United Kingdom
March 1964	"Like a Nightmare"	"If You Were Mine"	The Andantes	VIP 25006	United States
March 1964	"Midnight Johnny"	"Keep Me"	Liz Lands	Gordy G 7030	United States
March 1964	"My Guy"	"Oh Little Boy (What Did You Do to Me)"	Mary Wells	Motown M 1056	United States
March 1964	"In My Lonely Room"	"A Tear for the Girl"	Martha and the Vandellas	Gordy G 7031	United States
March 1964	"Devil with the Blue Dress"	"Wind It Up"	Shorty Long	Soul S 35001	United States
March 1964	"Every Little Bit Hurts"	"Land of a Thousand Boys"	Brenda Holloway	Tamla T 54094	United States
March 1964	"Bringing in the Gold"	"I've Been a Long Time Leaving"	Howard Crockett	Mel-o-dy 111	United States
March 1964	"Satisfied Mind"	"That's What's Happenin'"	Bruce Channel	Mel-o-dy 112	United States
March 1964	"Live Wire"	"Old Love (Let's Try Again)"	Martha and the Vandellas	Stateside SS 272	United Kingdom
April 1964	"Once Upon a Time"	"What's the Matter with You Baby"	Marvin Gaye & Mary Wells	Motown M 1057	United States
April 1964	"Just Ain't Enough Love"	"Last Night I Had a Vision"	Eddie Holland	Motown M 1058	United States
April 1964	"I'll Be in Trouble"	"The Girl's Alright with Me"	The Temptations	Gordy G 7032	United States
April 1964	"He's a Good Guy(Yes He Is)"	"Goddess of Love"	The Marvelettes	Stateside SS 273	United Kingdom
April 1964	"The Way You Do the Things You Do"	"Just Let Me Know"	The Temptations	Stateside SS 278	United Kingdom
April 1964	"(You Can't Let the Boy Overpower) The Man in You"	"Heartbreak Road"	The Miracles	Stateside SS 282	United Kingdom
April 1964	"You're a Wonderful One"	"When I'm Alone I Cry"	Marvin Gaye	Stateside SS 284	United Kingdom
April 1964	"Castles in the Sand"	"Thank You (for Loving Me All the Way)"	Little Stevie Wonder	Stateside SS 285	United Kingdom
April 1964	"My Guy"	"Oh Little Boy (What Did You Do to Me)"	Mary Wells	Stateside SS 288	United Kingdom
May 1964	"Hey Harmonica Man"	"This Little Girl"	Stevie Wonder	Tamla T 54096	United States
May 1964	"Little Acorn"	"Cold as Usual"	Dorsey Burnette	Mel-o-dy 113	United States
May 1964	"You're Just Like You"	"Here Comes That Heartache"	Bobby Breen	Motown M 1059	United States
May 1964	"Try It Baby"	"If My Heart Could Sing"	Marvin Gaye	Tamla T 54095	United States
May 1964	"Can You Do It"	"I'll Stand by You"	The Contours	Stateside SS 299	United Kingdom
June 1964	"I Like It Like That"	"You're So Fine and Sweet"	The Miracles	Tamla T 54098	United States
June 1964	"You're My Remedy"	"A Little Bit of Sympathy, a Little Bit of Love"	The Marvelettes	Tamla T 54097	United States
June 1964	"Where Did Our Love Go"	"He Means the World to Me"	The Supremes	Motown M 1060	United States
June 1964	"Jimmy Brown"	"Everybody's Angel"	Dorsey Burnette	Mel-o-dy 116	United States
June 1964	"In My Lonely Room"	"A Tear for the Girl"	Martha and the Vandellas	Stateside SS 305	United Kingdom
June 1964	"Every Little Bit Hurts"	"Land of a Thousand Boys"	Brenda Holloway	Stateside SS 307	United Kingdom
July 1964	"I'll Always Love You"	"Sad Song"	Brenda Holloway	Tamla T 54099	United States
July 1964	"When I'm Gone"	"Guarantee (for a Lifetime)"	Mary Wells	Motown M 1061 (unreleased)	United States
July 1964	"Baby I Need Your Loving"	"Call on Me"	Four Tops	Motown M 1062	United States
July 1964	"Since I've Lost You"	"I Want Her Love"	Jimmy Ruffin	Soul S 35002	United States
July 1964	"You Make Me Happy"	"You Never Looked Better"	Bruce Channel	Mel-o-dy 114	United States
July 1964	"Candy to Me"	"If You Don't Want My Love"	Eddie Holland	Motown M 1063	United States
July 1964	"Dancing in the Street"	"There He Is (at My Door)"	Martha and the Vandellas	Gordy G 7033	United States
July 1964	"Baby I Miss You"	"Leaving Here"	Tommy Good	Gordy G 7034	United States
July 1964	"Once Upon a Time"	"What's the Matter with You Baby"	Marvin Gaye & Mary Wells	Stateside SS 316	United Kingdom
July 1964	"I'll Be in Trouble"	"The Girl's Alright with Me"	The Temptations	Stateside SS 319	United Kingdom
August 1964	"My Smile Is Just a Frown (Turned Upside Down)"	"I'll Come Running"	Carolyn Crawford	Motown M 1064	United States
August 1964	"Looking for the Right Guy"	"Feel Alright Tonight"	Kim Weston	Tamla T 54100	United States
August 1964	"Girl (Why You Wanna Make Me Blue)"	"Baby, Baby I Need You"	The Temptations	Gordy G 7035	United States
August 1964	"My Lil's Run Off"	"Spanish Lace and Memories"	Howard Crockett	Mel-o-dy 115	United States
August 1964	"Satan's Blues"	"Monkey Jump"	Junior Walker & the All Stars	Soul S 35003	United States
August 1964	"Bread Winner"	"You've Got to Change"	Sammy Ward	Soul S 35004	United States
August 1964	"It's a Crying Shame (The Way You Treat a Good Man like Me)"	"Out to Get You"	Shorty Long	Soul S 35005	United States
August 1964	"That's What Love Is Made Of"	"Would I Love You"	The Miracles	Tamla T 54102	United States
August 1964	"Hey Harmonica Man"	"This Little Girl"	Stevie Wonder	Stateside SS 323	United Kingdom
August 1964	"I Like It Like That"	"You're So Fine and Sweet"	The Miracles	Stateside SS 324	United Kingdom
August 1964	"Try It Baby"	"If My Heart Could Sing"	Marvin Gaye	Stateside SS 326	United Kingdom
August 1964	"Where Did Our Love Go"	"He Means the World to Me"	The Supremes	Stateside SS 327	United Kingdom
August 1964	"Greetings to Tamla Motown Appreciation Society"	"Greetings to Tamla Motown Appreciation Society"	Various artists	Hitsville USA (no cat-no; promo-only)	United Kingdom
September 1964	"Lifetime Man"	"Mr. Lonely Heart"	Oma Heard	VIP 25008	United States
September 1964	"Baby Don't You Do It"	"Walk on the Wild Side"	Marvin Gaye	Tamla T 54101	United States
September 1964	"Needle in a Haystack"	"Should I Tell Them"	The Velvelettes	VIP 25007	United States
September 1964	"Happy Street"	"Sad Boy"	Stevie Wonder	Tamla T 54103	United States
September 1964	"Baby Love"	"Ask Any Girl"	The Supremes	Motown M 1066	United States
September 1964	"Whisper You Love Me Boy"	"I'll Be Available"	Mary Wells	Motown M 1065 (unreleased)	United States
September 1964	"Soul Stomp"	"Hot 'n' Tot"	Earl Van Dyke	Soul S 35006	United States
September 1964	"What Good Am I Without You"	"I Want You 'Round"	Marvin Gaye & Kim Weston	Tamla T 54104	United States
September 1964	"You're My Remedy"	"A Little Bit of Sympathy, a Little Bit of Love"	The Marvelettes	Stateside SS 334	United Kingdom
September 1964	"Baby I Need Your Loving"	"Call on Me"	Four Tops	Stateside SS 336	United Kingdom
October 1964	"Who You Gonna Run To"	"Same Old Story"	Mickey McCullers	VIP 25009	United States
October 1964	"Sweet Thing"	"How Can I"	The Spinners	Motown M 1067	United States
October 1964	"Hello Love"	"The Further You Look, the Less You See"	The Majestics	VIP 25010 (unreleased)	United States
October 1964	"Tonight's the Night"	"You're Bad News"	The Headliners	VIP 25011	United States
October 1964	"Too Many Fish in the Sea"	"A Need for Love"	The Marvelettes	Tamla T 54105	United States
October 1964	"Come See About Me"	"Always in My Heart"	The Supremes	Motown M 1068	United States
October 1964	"Pretty Little Angel"	"Tears in Vain"	Stevie Wonder	Tamla T 54108	United States
October 1964	"Dancing in the Street"	"There He Is (at My Door)"	Martha and the Vandellas	Stateside SS 345	United Kingdom
October 1964	"Girl (Why You Wanna Make Me Blue)"	"Baby, Baby I Need You"	The Temptations	Stateside SS 348	United Kingdom
October 1964	"Baby Love"	"Ask Any Girl"	The Supremes	Stateside SS 350	United Kingdom
October 1964	"That's What Love Is Made Of"	"Would I Love You"	The Miracles	Stateside SS 353	United Kingdom
November 1964	"Without the One You Love (Life's Not Worth While)"	"Love Has Gone"	Four Tops	Motown M 1069	United States
November 1964	"How Sweet It Is (To Be Loved by You)"	"Forever"	Marvin Gaye	Tamla T 54107	United States
November 1964	"A Little More Love"	"Go Ahead and Laugh"	Kim Weston	Tamla T 54106	United States
November 1964	"Wild One"	"Dancing Slow"	Martha and the Vandellas	Gordy G 7036	United States
November 1964	"When Someone's Good to You"	"My Heart"	Carolyn Crawford	Motown M 1070	United States
November 1964	"Can You Jerk Like Me"	"That Day When She Needed Me"	The Contours	Gordy G 7037	United States
November 1964	"Come On Do the Jerk"	"Baby Don't You Go"	The Miracles	Tamla T 54109	United States
November 1964	"Randy, the Newspaper Boy"	"Happy Ghoul Tide"	Ray Oddis	VIP 25012	United States
November 1964	"Talkin' to Your Picture"	"Our Rhapsody"	Tony Martin	Motown M 1071	United States
November 1964	"Ever Since the World Began"	"Long Long Time Ago"	Dorsey Burnette	Mel-o-dy 118	United States
November 1964	"This Is the Life"	"My Way"	Marvin Gaye	Tamla (no cat-no; promo-only)	United States
November 1964	"Soul Stomp"	"Hot 'n' Tot"	Earl Van Dyke	Stateside SS 357	United Kingdom
November 1964	"A Little More Love"	"Go Ahead and Laugh"	Kim Weston	Stateside SS 359	United Kingdom
November 1964	"How Sweet It Is (To Be Loved by You)"	"Forever"	Marvin Gaye	Stateside SS 360	United Kingdom
November 1964	"Needle in a Haystack"	"Should I Tell Them"	The Velvelettes	Stateside SS 361	United Kingdom
December 1964	"My Girl"	"(Talkin' 'Bout) Nobody but My Baby"	The Temptations	Gordy G 7038	United States
December 1964	"Come See About Me"	"Pride and Joy"	Choker Campbell's Big Band	Motown M 1072	United States
December 1964	"Put Me in Your Pocket"	"The Miles"	Howard Crockett	Mel-o-dy 119	United States
December 1964	"He Was Really Sayin' Somethin'"	"Throw a Farewell Kiss"	The Velvelettes	VIP 25013	United States
December 1964	"Do the Pig"	"Thompin'"	The Merced Blue Notes	Soul S 35007 (unreleased)	United States
December 1964	"What Good Am I Without You"	"I Want You 'Round"	Marvin Gaye & Kim Weston	Stateside SS 363	United Kingdom
January 1965	"Ask the Lonely"	"Where Did You Go"	Four Tops	Motown M 1073	United States
January 1965	"Do You Know What I'm Talkin' About"	"You Say You Love Me"	The Downbeats	VIP 25007 (unreleased)	United States
January 1965	"Conscience I'm Guilty"	"You Got Me Worried"	Hattie Littles	VIP 25015 (unreleased)	United States
January 1965	"Shotgun"	"Hot Cha"	Junior Walker & the All Stars	Soul S 35008	United States
January 1965	"All for You"	"Too Many Fish in the Sea"	Earl Van Dyke & the Soul Brothers	Soul S 35009 (unreleased)	United States
January 1965	"Love Makes the World Go 'Round, but Money Greases the Wheel"	"Come On Back (and Be My Love Again)"	Dee Mullins	Mel-o-dy 117	United States
January 1965	"I'm Still Loving You"	"Go Ahead and Laugh"	Kim Weston	Tamla T 54110	United States
January 1965	"Too Many Fish in the Sea"	"A Need for Love"	The Marvelettes	Stateside SS 369	United Kingdom
January 1965	"Without the One You Love (Life's Not Worth While)"	"Love Has Gone"	Four Tops	Stateside SS 371	United Kingdom
January 1965	"Come See About Me"	"Always in My Heart"	The Supremes	Stateside SS 376	United Kingdom
January 1965	"Come On Do the Jerk"	"Baby Don't You Go"	The Miracles	Stateside SS 377	United Kingdom
January 1965	"My Girl"	"(Talkin' 'Bout) Nobody but My Baby"	The Temptations	Stateside SS 378	United Kingdom
January 1965	"Can You Jerk Like Me"	"That Day When She Needed Me"	The Contours	Stateside SS 381	United Kingdom
January 1965	"Wild One"	"Dancing Slow"	Martha and the Vandellas	Stateside SS 383	United Kingdom
February 1965	"Nowhere to Run"	"Motoring"	Martha and the Vandellas	Gordy G 7039	United States
February 1965	"Stop! In the Name of Love"	"I'm in Love Again"	The Supremes	Motown M 1074	United States
February 1965	"When I'm Gone"	"I've Been Good to You"	Brenda Holloway	Tamla T 54111	United States
February 1965	"I'll Be Doggone"	"You've Been a Long Time Coming"	Marvin Gaye	Tamla T 54112	United States
February 1965	"When Someone's Good to You"	"My Heart"	Carolyn Crawford	Stateside SS 384	United Kingdom
February 1965	"He Was Really Sayin' Somethin'"	"Throw a Farewell Kiss"	The Velvelettes	Stateside SS 387	United Kingdom
March 1965	"Ooo Baby Baby"	"All That's Good"	The Miracles	Tamla T 54113	United States
March 1965	"It's Growing"	"What Love Has Joined Together"	The Temptations	Gordy G 7040	United States
March 1965	"Never Say No to Your Baby"	"Let's Dance"	The Hit Pack	Soul S 35010	United States
March 1965	"Kiss Me Baby"	"Tears in Vain"	Stevie Wonder	Tamla T 54114	United States
March 1965	"You Only Pass This Way One Time"	"Rain Is a Lonesome Thing"	The Hillsiders	Mel-o-dy 120	United States
March 1965	"My Baby"	"Beautiful Brown Eyes"	The Freeman Brothers	Soul S 35011	United States
March 1965	"Talkin' to Your Picture"	"Our Rhapsody"	Tony Martin	Stateside SS 394	United Kingdom
March 1965	"Stop! In the Name of Love"	"I'm in Love Again"	The Supremes	Tamla Motown TMG 501	United Kingdom
March 1965	"Nowhere to Run"	"Motoring"	Martha and the Vandellas	Tamla Motown TMG 502	United Kingdom
March 1965	"Ooo Baby Baby"	"All That's Good"	The Miracles	Tamla Motown TMG 503	United Kingdom
March 1965	"It's Growing"	"What Love Has Joined Together"	The Temptations	Tamla Motown TMG 504	United Kingdom
March 1965	"Kiss Me Baby"	"Tears in Vain"	Stevie Wonder	Tamla Motown TMG 505	United Kingdom
March 1965	"All for You"	"Too Many Fish in the Sea"	Earl Van Dyke & the Soul Brothers	Tamla Motown TMG 506	United Kingdom
March 1965	"Ask the Lonely"	"Where Did You Go"	Four Tops	Tamla Motown TMG 507	United Kingdom
April 1965	"Back in My Arms Again"	"Whisper You Love Me Boy"	The Supremes	Motown M 1075	United States
April 1965	"A Thrill a Moment"	"I'll Never See My Love Again"	Kim Weston	Gordy G 7041	United States
April 1965	"I Can't Help Myself (Sugar Pie Honey Bunch)"	"Sad Souvenirs"	Four Tops	Motown M 1076	United States
April 1965	"All the Good Times Are Gone"	"The Great Titanic"	Howard Crockett	Mel-o-dy 121	United States
April 1965	"When I'm Gone"	"I've Been Good to You"	Brenda Holloway	Tamla Motown TMG 508	United Kingdom
April 1965	"Shotgun"	"Hot Cha"	Junior Walker & the All Stars	Tamla Motown TMG 509	United Kingdom
April 1965	"I'll Be Doggone"	"You've Been a Long Time Coming"	Marvin Gaye	Tamla Motown TMG 510	United Kingdom
April 1965	"I'm Still Loving You"	"Go Ahead and Laugh"	Kim Weston	Tamla Motown TMG 511	United Kingdom
April 1965	"Out to Get You"	"It's a Crying Shame (The Way You Treat a Good Man like Me)"	Shorty Long	Tamla Motown TMG 512	United Kingdom
May 1965	"Lonely Lonely Girl Am I"	"I'm the Exception to the Rule"	The Velvelettes	VIP 25017	United States
May 1965	"I'll Keep Holding On"	"No Time for Tears"	The Marvelettes	Tamla T 54116	United States
May 1965	"Do the Boomerang"	"Tune Up"	Junior Walker & the All Stars	Soul S 35012	United States
May 1965	"Operator"	"I'll Be Available"	Brenda Holloway	Tamla T 54115	United States
May 1965	"Down to Earth"	"Had You Been Around"	Billy Eckstine	Motown M 1077	United States
May 1965	"Buttered Popcorn"	"Tell Me"	The Vows	VIP 25016	United States
May 1965	"He's an Oddball"	"By Some Chance"	The Lewis Sisters	VIP 25018	United States
May 1965	"Why Do You Want to Let Me Go"	"I'm Not a Plaything"	Marv Johnson	Gordy G 7042	United States
May 1965	"Never Say No to Your Baby"	"Let's Dance"	The Hit Pack	Tamla Motown TMG 513	United Kingdom
May 1965	"Sweet Thing"	"How Can I"	The Detroit Spinners	Tamla Motown TMG 514	United Kingdom
May 1965	"I Can't Help Myself (Sugar Pie Honey Bunch)"	"Sad Souvenirs"	Four Tops	Tamla Motown TMG 515	United Kingdom
May 1965	"Back in My Arms Again"	"Whisper You Love Me Boy"	The Supremes	Tamla Motown TMG 516	United Kingdom
June 1965	"The Only Time I'm Happy"	"Supremes Interview"	The Supremes	George Alexander Inc. 1079	United States
June 1965	"Since I Lost My Baby"	"You've Got to Earn It"	The Temptations	Gordy G 7043	United States
June 1965	"I'll Always Love You"	"Tomorrow May Never Come"	The Spinners	Motown M 1078	United States
June 1965	"This Time Last Summer"	"Please Don't Turn the Lights Out"	Danny Day	VIP 25019	United States
June 1965	"Why Break My Heart (Just to Run Around)"	"They're Only Words"	Dorsey Burnette	VIP 25020 (unreleased)	United States
June 1965	"Pretty Little Baby"	"Now That You've Won Me"	Marvin Gaye	Tamla T 54117	United States
June 1965	"First I Look at the Purse"	"Searching for a Girl"	The Contours	Gordy G 7044	United States
June 1965	"The Tracks of My Tears"	"A Fork in the Road"	The Miracles	Tamla T 54118	United States
June 1965	"Mickey's Monkey"	"Pride and Joy"	Choker Campbell's Big Band	Tamla Motown TMG 517	United Kingdom
June 1965	"I'll Keep Holding On"	"No Time for Tears"	The Marvelettes	Tamla Motown TMG 518	United Kingdom
June 1965	"Operator"	"I'll Be Available"	Brenda Holloway	Tamla Motown TMG 519	United Kingdom
July 1965	"Shake and Fingerpop"	"Cleo's Back"	Junior Walker & the All Stars	Soul S 35013	United States
July 1965	"It's the Same Old Song"	"Your Love Is Amazing"	Four Tops	Motown M 1081	United States
July 1965	"Mother Dear"	"He Holds His Own"	The Supremes	Motown M 1080 (unreleased)	United States
July 1965	"Nothing but Heartaches"	"He Holds His Own"	The Supremes	Motown M 1080	United States
July 1965	"Danger Heartbreak Dead Ahead"	"Your Cheating Ways"	The Marvelettes	Tamla T 54120	United States
July 1965	"You've Changed Me"	"Who's Lovin' You"	Brenda Holloway	Tamla T 54121 (unreleased)	United States
July 1965	"You've Been in Love Too Long"	"Love (Makes Me Do Foolish Things)"	Martha and the Vandellas	Gordy G 7045	United States
July 1965	"Do the Boomerang"	"Tune Up"	Junior Walker & the All Stars	Tamla Motown TMG 520	United Kingdom
July 1965	"Lonely Lonely Girl Am I"	"I'm the Exception to the Rule"	The Velvelettes	Tamla Motown TMG 521	United Kingdom
July 1965	"The Tracks of My Tears"	"A Fork in the Road"	The Miracles	Tamla Motown TMG 522	United Kingdom
August 1965	"High Heel Sneakers" (live)	"Funny How Time Slips Away" (live)	Stevie Wonder	Tamla T 54119	United States
August 1965	"The Bigger Your Heart Is (the Harder You'll Fall)"	"The Two of Us"	Tony Martin	Motown M 1082	United States
August 1965	"I Don't Know What to Do"	"What Now My Love"	Richard Anthony	VIP 25022	United States
August 1965	"Hang On Bill"	"Puppet on a String"	Little Lisa	VIP 25023	United States
August 1965	"You Can Cry on My Shoulder"	"How Many Times Did You Mean It"	Brenda Holloway	Tamla T 54121 (second pressing)	United States
August 1965	"You Need Me"	"Moonlight on the Beach"	The Lewis Sisters	VIP 25024	United States
August 1965	"I'll Always Love You"	"Tomorrow May Never Come"	The Detroit Spinners	Tamla Motown TMG 523	United Kingdom
August 1965	"Pretty Little Baby"	"Now That You've Won Me"	Marvin Gaye	Tamla Motown TMG 524	United Kingdom
August 1965	"Why Do You Want to Let Me Go"	"I'm Not a Plaything"	Marv Johnson	Tamla Motown TMG 525	United Kingdom
August 1965	"Since I Lost My Baby"	"You've Got to Earn It"	The Temptations	Tamla Motown TMG 526	United Kingdom
August 1965	"Nothing but Heartaches"	"He Holds His Own"	The Supremes	Tamla Motown TMG 527	United Kingdom
August 1965	"It's the Same Old Song"	"Your Love Is Amazing"	Four Tops	Tamla Motown TMG 528	United Kingdom
September 1965	"Take Me in Your Arms (Rock Me a Little While)"	"Don't Compare Me with Her"	Kim Weston	Gordy G 7046	United States
September 1965	"Things Are Changing"	"Things Are Changing"	The Supremes	Eeoc S14m 3114 (Advertising Council promo-only)	United States
September 1965	"Ain't That Peculiar"	"She's Got to Be Real"	Marvin Gaye	Tamla T 54122	United States
September 1965	"My Girl Has Gone"	"Since You Won My Heart"	The Miracles	Tamla T 54123	United States
September 1965	"My Baby"	"Don't Look Back"	The Temptations	Gordy G 7047	United States
September 1965	"I Can't Help Myself (Sugar Pie Honey Bunch)"	"How Sweet It Is (To Be Loved by You)"	Earl Van Dyke & the Soul Brothers	Soul S 35014	United States
September 1965	"Shake and Fingerpop"	"Cleo's Back"	Junior Walker & the All Stars	Tamla Motown TMG 529	United Kingdom
September 1965	"You've Been in Love Too Long"	"Love (Makes Me Do Foolish Things)"	Martha and the Vandellas	Tamla Motown TMG 530	United Kingdom
September 1965	"First I Look at the Purse"	"Searching for a Girl"	The Contours	Tamla Motown TMG 531	United Kingdom
September 1965	"High Heel Sneakers" (live)	"Music Talk"	Stevie Wonder	Tamla Motown TMG 532	United Kingdom
October 1965	"I Hear a Symphony"	"Who Could Ever Doubt My Love"	The Supremes	Motown M 1083	United States
October 1965	"As Long as There Is L-O-V-E Love"	"How Can I Say I'm Sorry"	Jimmy Ruffin	Soul S 35016	United States
October 1965	"We Call It Fun"	"Voodoo Plan"	The Headliners	VIP 25026	United States
October 1965	"Something About You"	"Darling, I Hum Our Song"	Four Tops	Motown M 1084	United States
October 1965	"I've Been Cheated"	"Take My Hand"	The Dalton Boys	VIP 25025 (unreleased)	United States
October 1965	"I've Been Cheated"	"Something's Bothering You"	The Dalton Boys	VIP 25025	United States
October 1965	"Let's Go Somewhere"	"Poor Girl"	R. Dean Taylor	VIP 25027	United States
October 1965	"Down to Earth"	"Had You Been Around"	Billy Eckstine	Tamla Motown TMG 533	United Kingdom
October 1965	"Jimmy Brown"	"Everybody's Angel"	Dorsey Burnette	Tamla Motown TMG 534	United Kingdom
October 1965	"Danger! Heartbreak Dead Ahead"	"Your Cheating Ways"	The Marvelettes	Tamla Motown TMG 535	United Kingdom
October 1965	"You Need Me"	"Moonlight on the Beach"	The Lewis Sisters	Tamla Motown TMG 536	United Kingdom
October 1965	"The Bigger Your Heart Is (The Harder You'll Fall)"	"The Two of Us"	Tony Martin	Tamla Motown TMG 537	United Kingdom
October 1965	"Take Me in Your Arms (Rock Me a Little While)"	"Don't Compare Me with Her"	Kim Weston	Tamla Motown TMG 538	United Kingdom
November 1965	"Say You"	"All for Someone"	The Monitors	VIP 25028	United States
November 1965	"I Can't Believe You Love Me"	"Hold Me Oh My Darling"	Tammi Terrell	Motown M 1086	United States
November 1965	"You're Gonna Love My Baby"	"The Touch of Time"	Barbara McNair	Motown M 1087	United States
November 1965	"Children's Christmas Song"	"Twinkle Twinkle Little Me"	The Supremes	Motown M 1085	United States
November 1965	"Uptight (Everything's Alright)"	"Purple Rain Drops"	Stevie Wonder	Tamla T 54124	United States
November 1965	"A Bird in the Hand (Is Worth Two in the Bush)"	"Since You've Been Loving Me"	The Velvelettes	VIP 25030	United States
November 1965	"Don't Mess with Bill"	"Anything You Wanna Do"	The Marvelettes	Tamla T 54126	United States
November 1965	"The Flick (Part II)"	"The Flick (Part I)"	Earl Van Dyke & the Soul Brothers	Soul S 35018	United States
December 1965	"Do Right Baby Do Right"	"Don’t Be Too Long"	Chris Clark	VIP 25031	United States
December 1965	"Going To A Go-Go"	"Choosey Beggar"	The Miracles	Tamla T 54127	United States
December 1965	"Ask Any Man"	"Spanish Rose"	Tony Martin	Motown M 1088	United States
December 1965	"Cleo's Mood"	"Baby You Know You Ain’t Right"	Junior Walker & the All Stars	Soul S 35017	United States
December 1965	"My World Is Empty Without You"	"Everything Is Good About You"	The Supremes	Motown M 1089	United States
December 1965	"Do I Love You (Indeed I Do)"	"Sweeter As The Days Go By"	Frank Wilson	Soul S 35019 (unreleased)	United States
December 1965	"Put Yourself In My Place"	"Darling Baby"	The Elgins	VIP 25029	United States
January 1966	"My Baby Loves Me"	"Never Leave Your Baby’s Side"	Martha and the Vandellas	Gordy G 7048	United States
January 1966	"Together ‘Til The End Of Time"	"Sad Song"	Brenda Holloway	Tamla T 54125	United States
January 1966	"This Old Heart Of Mine (Is Weak For You)"	"There's No Love Left"	The Isley Brothers	Tamla T 54128	United States
January 1966	"One More Heartache"	"When I Had Your Love"	Marvin Gaye	Tamla T 54129	United States
February 1966	"Shake Me, Wake Me (When It's Over)"	"Just As Long As You Need Me"	Four Tops	Motown M 1090	United States
February 1966	"Get Ready"	"Fading Away"	The Temptations	Gordy G 7049	United States
1969	"Too Busy Thinking About My Baby"	Wherever I Lay My Hat (That's My Home)	Marvin Gaye	Tamla T 54181	United States

== Number-one US singles ==
This is a list of singles released on one of the various labels owned by Motown that reached #1 on the Billboard Hot 100 in the United States.

Billboard chart-topping singles released by Motown
Year	Song title	Performer(s)	Weeks at no. 1	UK chart peak
1961	"Please Mr. Postman"	The Marvelettes	1	—
1963	"Fingertips"	Little Stevie Wonder	3	—
1964	"My Guy"	Mary Wells	2	5
1964	"Where Did Our Love Go"	The Supremes	2	3
1964	"Baby Love"	The Supremes	4	1
1964	"Come See About Me"	The Supremes	2	27
1965	"My Girl"	The Temptations	1	43
1965	"Stop! In the Name of Love"	The Supremes	2	7
1965	"Back in My Arms Again"	The Supremes	1	40
1965	"I Can't Help Myself (Sugar Pie Honey Bunch)"	Four Tops	2	23
1965	"I Hear a Symphony"	The Supremes	2	39
1966	"You Can't Hurry Love"	The Supremes	2	3
1966	"Reach Out I'll Be There"	Four Tops	2	1
1966	"You Keep Me Hangin' On"	The Supremes	2	8
1967	"Love Is Here and Now You're Gone"	The Supremes	1	17
1967	"The Happening"	The Supremes	1	6
1968	"Love Child"	Diana Ross & the Supremes	2	15
1968	"I Heard It Through the Grapevine"	Marvin Gaye	7	1
1969	"I Can't Get Next to You"	The Temptations	2	13
1969	"Someday We'll Be Together"	Diana Ross & the Supremes	1	13
1970	"I Want You Back"	The Jackson 5	1	2
1970	"ABC"	The Jackson 5	2	8
1970	"The Love You Save"	The Jackson 5	2	7
1970	"War"	Edwin Starr	3	3
1970	"Ain't No Mountain High Enough"	Diana Ross	3	6
1970	"I'll Be There"	The Jackson 5	5	4
1970	"The Tears of a Clown"	Smokey Robinson & the Miracles	2	1
1971	"Just My Imagination (Running Away with Me)"	The Temptations	2	8
1972	"Ben"	Michael Jackson	1	7
1972	"Papa Was a Rollin' Stone"	The Temptations	1	14
1973	"Superstition"	Stevie Wonder	1	11
1973	"You Are the Sunshine of My Life"	Stevie Wonder	1	7
1973	"Touch Me in the Morning"	Diana Ross	1	9
1973	"Let's Get It On"	Marvin Gaye	2	31
1973	"Keep on Truckin' (Part 1)"	Eddie Kendricks	2	18
1974	"You Haven't Done Nothin'"	Stevie Wonder	1	30
1976	"Theme from Mahogany (Do You Know Where You're Going To)"	Diana Ross	1	5
1976	"Love Machine (Part 1)"	The Miracles	1	3
1976	"Love Hangover"	Diana Ross	2	10
1977	"I Wish"	Stevie Wonder	1	5
1977	"Don't Leave Me This Way"	Thelma Houston	1	13
1977	"Sir Duke"	Stevie Wonder	3	2
1977	"Got to Give It Up (Pt. 1)"	Marvin Gaye	1	7
1978	"Three Times a Lady"	Commodores	2	1
1979	"Still"	Commodores	1	4
1980	"Upside Down"	Diana Ross	4	2
1981	"Endless Love"	Diana Ross & Lionel Richie	9	7
1982	"Truly"	Lionel Richie	2	6
1983	"All Night Long (All Night)"	Lionel Richie	4	2
1984	"Hello"	Lionel Richie	2	1
1984	"I Just Called to Say I Love You"	Stevie Wonder	3	1
1985	"Part-Time Lover"	Stevie Wonder	1	3
1985	"Say You, Say Me"	Lionel Richie	4	8
1992	"End of the Road"	Boyz II Men	13	1
1994	"I'll Make Love to You"	Boyz II Men	14	5
1994	"On Bended Knee"	Boyz II Men	6	20
1997	"4 Seasons of Loneliness"	Boyz II Men	1	10

== Notes ==
- Betts notes that "I Can't Concentrate" came out some time between January and April 1959 and is certain that "Come to Me" was released as the first Motown single.
