= Recorded Live On Stage =

Live album by Mary Wells
- Released: September 1963
- Recorded: 1962–1963
- Venue: Regal Theatre, Chicago; Graystone Ballroom, Detroit; Apollo Theater, New York City
- Genre: Soul
- Label: Motown; M 611

Mary Wells chronology
Two Lovers and Other Great Hits (1963)	Recorded Live On Stage (1963)	Greatest Hits (1964)

Recorded Live On Stage is the name of a 1963 live album recorded by Motown star Mary Wells. The album was the only live album released by the soul singer during her short but successful tenure with Motown Records in the early sixties. The album starts off with an a cappella introduction of Wells by her backup vocalists, The Love-Tones, who are heard throughout the album. Her live version of her first release, "Bye, Bye, Baby" improved upon the studio version and became the way she would perform it from then on. The only other live performances Wells recorded on Motown can be found on the first two volumes of the Motortown Revue series. Marvin Gaye, the Marvelettes, (Little) Stevie Wonder and Smokey Robinson & The Miracles also recorded albums in the Recorded Live On Stage series.

== Track listing ==
=== Side one ===
1. "Two Lovers" (Smokey Robinson) recorded live at the Regal Theatre, Chicago, 1963.
2. "Introduction of Band"
3. "Laughing Boy" (Smokey Robinson) recorded live at the Regal Theatre, Chicago.
4. "I Don't Want to Take a Chance" (Smokey Robinson) recorded live at the Graystone Ballroom, Detroit, August 1963.
5. "Bye Bye Baby" (Mary Wells) recorded live at the Apollo Theater, New York City, December 31, 1962.

=== Side two ===
1. "The One Who Really Loves You" (Smokey Robinson) recorded live at the Regal Theatre, Chicago.
2. "Old Love (Let's Try It Again)" (Eddie Holland, Lamont Dozier, Freddie Gorman) recorded live at the Graystone Ballroom, Detroit, August 1963.
3. "Operator" (Smokey Robinson) recorded live at the Graystone Ballroom, Detroit, August 1963.
4. "You Beat Me to the Punch" (Smokey Robinson, Ronald White) recorded live at the Apollo Theatre, New York City, December 31, 1962.
