= Greatest Hits (Mary Wells album) =

Mary Wells Greatest Hits

Greatest hits album by Mary Wells
- Released: April 15, 1964
- Recorded: 1960–1964
- Genre: Soul
- Label: Motown
- Producer: Berry Gordy, Smokey Robinson, Mickey Stevenson

Mary Wells chronology
Recorded Live On Stage (1963)	Mary Wells Greatest Hits (1964)	Together (1964)

Singles from Greatest Hits
- 1. "Your Old Standby" Released: April 24, 1963; 2. "What's Easy for Two Is Hard for One/You Lost the Sweetest Boy" Released: August 30, 1963; 3. "My Guy" Released: March 13, 1964

Mary Wells Greatest Hits is a greatest-hits compilation album released by Motown singer Mary Wells in 1964 on the Motown label. As the standout early star of Motown Records, Wells, thanks to producers such as Berry Gordy and Smokey Robinson, rose to prominence as Motown's first crossover star for a brief period between 1961 and 1964 before she left the label that year for 20th Century Fox Records. This collection collected the best of Wells' hits with the label.

It was rated 4.5 stars by AllMusic.

== Track listing ==
=== Side one ===
1. "The One Who Really Loves You"
2. "You Beat Me to the Punch"
3. "Two Lovers"
4. "Your Old Standby"
5. "What's Easy for Two Is So Hard for One"
6. "My Guy"

=== Side two ===
1. "Laughing Boy"
2. "What Love Has Joined Together"
3. "Oh Little Boy (What Did You Do to Me)"
4. "Old Love (Let's Try Again)"
5. "You Lost the Sweetest Boy"
6. "Bye Bye Baby"

== Personnel ==
- Mary Wells - lead vocals
- Liz Lands - background vocals
- The Rayber Voices - background vocals
- The Love Tones - background vocals
- The Andantes - background vocals
- The Supremes - background vocals
- The Temptations - background vocals
- The Funk Brothers - instrumentation
