= Vintage Stock =

Greatest hits album by Mary Wells
- Released: November 1966
- Recorded: 1962–1964
- Genre: Soul
- Label: Motown
- Producer: Smokey Robinson; Norman Whitfield

Mary Wells chronology
The Two Sides of Mary Wells (1966)	Vintage Stock (1966)	Servin' Up Some Soul (1968)

Singles from Vintage Stock
- 1. "Operator" Released: 1963; 2. "When I'm Gone" Released: 1964

Vintage Stock is a compilation album consisting of hit singles, b-sides and unreleased material recorded by Mary Wells during the R&B singer's tenure at Motown. It was released two years after she departed from the label.

== Track listing ==
=== Side one ===
1. "The One Who Really Loves You"
2. "When I'm Gone" (later covered by Brenda Holloway)
3. "He's The One I Love" (later covered by Tammi Terrell)
4. "Two Lovers"
5. "Guarantee (For a Lifetime)"
6. "Honey Boy"

=== Side two ===
1. "My Guy"
2. "Everybody Needs Love" (later covered by The Velvelettes, Gladys Knight & the Pips, and Jimmy Ruffin)
3. "You Beat Me to the Punch"
4. "I'll Be Available" (later covered by Brenda Holloway)
5. "One Block from Heaven"
6. "Good-Bye and Good Luck"

== Personnel ==
- Lead vocals by Mary Wells
- Background vocals by and The Rayber Voices, The Love Tones, The Temptations, The Supremes, Martha & the Vandellas, and The Andantes
- Instrumentation by The Funk Brothers
