= Two Wrongs Don't Make a Right =

Single by Mary Wells

from the album The One Who Really Loves You
- A-side: "Laughing Boy"
- Released: 1963
- Recorded: Hitsville USA, 1962
- Genre: Soul/pop
- Length: 2:49
- Label: Motown; M 1035
- Songwriters: Berry Gordy, Jr., Smokey Robinson
- Producer: Smokey Robinson

Mary Wells singles chronology
"Two Lovers" (1963)	"Laughing Boy" / "Two Wrongs Don't Make a Right" (1963)	"Your Old Standby" (1963)

"Two Wrongs Don't Make a Right" is a bluesy-styled ballad written by Berry Gordy and Smokey Robinson and recorded by Motown star Mary Wells as the b-side to Wells' popular single, "Laughing Boy".

== Song information ==
The song was originally recorded by Barrett Strong, who scored Motown's first national hit with 1959's "Money (That's What I Want)", and his version was released as the B-side to his sixth and final Motown single, "Misery", in June, 1961.

The song itself has the narrator pleading to her lover not to repeat her mistakes after she was caught cheating on him. She basically warns the man that if he were ever to 'turn her away', she would tell him that 'two wrongs don't make a right' to prove a point. She begs him to take her back and promises that she'll never make the same mistake again.

== Charts ==
Released when Wells was one of Motown Records' most popular recording artists, the track got the record some additional radio play on top of that of its A-side. The song eventually peaked at number 100 on the Billboard Hot 100. It featured a rougher Wells vocal prominent in her album tracks and earlier hit releases. This song was co-written by Wells' main producer at the time, Smokey Robinson.

== Personnel ==
- Lead vocals by Mary Wells
- Instrumentation by The Funk Brothers
