= Keeping My Mind on Love =

Studio album by Mary Wells
- Released: 1990
- Recorded: 1989–1990, London, England
- Genre: Soul, dance
- Label: Motorcity
- Producer: Ian Levine

Mary Wells chronology
The Old, The New & The Best of Mary Wells (1983)	Keeping My Mind on Love (1990)	Looking Back: 1961–1964 (1993)

Professional ratings
Review scores
Source	Rating
AllMusic	3/5 stars
The Encyclopedia of Popular Music	2/5 stars

Keeping My Mind on Love is the 16th and final album recorded by Motown recording artist Mary Wells. On the Motorcity label, this was Wells's first new record in seven years: similar to many of the former Motown stars, Wells had signed with Motorcity to build on the new attention garnered by the sales of classic Motown singles. This was one of the few projects from the label to be released: it folded in the early to mid-1990s. After the release of this album, Wells promoted it until she was diagnosed with throat cancer, which took away her voice. Wells died of her illness in July 1992 at the age of 49.

== Track listing ==
1. "My Guy" (Smokey Robinson)
2. "Hold on a Little Longer" (Bobby Taylor, Ian Levine)
3. "Walk on the City Streets" (Steven Wagner, Ian Levine)
4. "Don't Burn Your Bridges" (Fiachra Trench, Ian Levine)
5. "What's Easy for Two Is So Hard for One" (Smokey Robinson)
6. "Keeping My Mind on Love" (Freddie Gorman, Ian Levine)
7. "Stop Before It's Too Late" (Freddie Gorman, Ian Levine, Janie Bradford, Steven Wagner)
8. "You're the Answer to My Dreams" (Steven Wagner, Ian Levine)
9. "You Beat Me to the Punch" (Smokey Robinson)
10. "Once Upon a Time" with Frankie Gaye (Al Hamilton, Clarence Paul, William Stevenson)
