= Shotgun (Junior Walker & the All Stars song) =

Single by Junior Walker & the All Stars

from the album Shotgun
- B-side: "Hot Cha"
- Released: February 13, 1965
- Recorded: 1964
- Studio: Hitsville U.S.A. (Studio A), Detroit, Michigan
- Genre: R&B; funk
- Length: 2:54
- Label: Soul
- Songwriter: Autry DeWalt a.k.a. Junior Walker
- Producers: Berry Gordy, Lawrence Horn

Junior Walker & the All Stars singles chronology
| "Satan's Blues" (1964) | "Shotgun" (1965) | "Do the Boomerang" (1965) |

"Shotgun" is a song written and performed by American soul musician Junior Walker that the singer-songwriter recorded with his group the All Stars. Called a "dance tune", it was produced by Berry Gordy Jr. and Lawrence Horn. Gordy's Soul Records, a Motown Records subsidiary, issued it as a single in 1965. It reached number 1 on the U.S. R&B Singles chart for four non-consecutive weeks and peaked at number 4 on the Billboard Hot 100. In Canada, the song reached number 26.

In 2002, the 1964 recording of the song credited to the full band Junior Walker & the All Stars on Soul Records was inducted into the Grammy Hall of Fame.

== Recording ==
"Shotgun" was Walker's debut as a vocalist – when the singer who was hired to perform at the recording session did not show up, Walker stood in. Rather than re-record the vocal at a later date, producer Gordy decided to keep Walker's take, much to the latter's surprise.

The song opens with the sound of a shotgun blast and a drum roll, with the verses alternating between Walker's vocals and tenor saxophone fills. It does not employ the typical progression, but remains on one chord throughout.

Personnel

- Junior Walker – lead vocals, tenor saxophone
- Willie Woods – lead guitar, harmony vocals
- Eddie Willis – rhythm guitar
- James Jamerson – bass
- Johnny Griffith – Hammond organ
- Victor Thomas – keyboards
- Jack Ashford – tambourine
- Benny Benjamin, Richard "Pistol" Allen, or Larrie Londin - drums

== Performances and renditions ==
In his biography, Robbie Robertson recalled an early performance of the song:

Junior Walker and the All Stars were a very different Motown act—raw, sax-blowing energy in a league all its own. A four piece unit, they sounded like eight. When the guitar player fell to his knees on "Shotgun", Junior Walker tore the roof off the joint.

In July 1965, Jimi Hendrix, who was then touring with Little Richard, made his first television appearance performing the song. With Richard's backup band and vocalists Buddy and Stacy, he was filmed for Nashville's Channel 5 Night Train show. In 1966, the Norwegian R&B group Public Enemies performed the song in the film Hurra for Andersens. Their version reached number 7 on Radio Luxembourg's Top 20 Chart. A version by Vanilla Fudge reached number 59 in Canada in 1969.

== See also ==
- List of number-one R&B singles of 1965 (U.S.)
- Motown singles discography
