= Mary Wells Sings My Guy =

Studio album by Mary Wells
- Released: May 1964
- Recorded: 1963–1964
- Studio: Hitsville USA
- Genre: Soul
- Label: Motown
- Producer: Smokey Robinson

Mary Wells chronology
Together (1964)	Mary Wells Sings My Guy (1964)	Mary Wells (1965)

Singles from Mary Wells Sings My Guy
- 1. "My Guy" Released: March 13, 1964

Mary Wells Sings My Guy is the fourth studio album and fifth overall album released by Motown vocalist Mary Wells. The album features her signature hit of the same name (which had already appeared on Greatest Hits earlier in the year) and the proposed singles "Whisper You Love Me Boy" and "He's the One I Love", the latter later re-recorded by Tammi Terrell during her own brief Motown tenure. It turned out to be the last studio effort Wells released for Motown as she left the label that year for 20th Century Fox Records.

Dezo Hoffmann was credited for front cover photography, with Lee Ivory writing the sleeve notes.

== Track listing ==
=== Side one ===
1. "He's The One I Love" (Smokey Robinson)
2. "Whisper You Love Me Boy" (Holland–Dozier–Holland)
3. "My Guy" (Smokey Robinson)
4. "Does He Love Me" (William "Mickey" Stevenson)
5. "How? (When My Heart Belongs To You)" (Smokey Robinson)
6. "He Holds His Own" (Holland-Dozier-Holland)

=== Side two ===
1. "My Baby Just Cares for Me" (Gus Kahn, Walter Donaldson)
2. "I Only Have Eyes for You" (Al Dubin, Harry Warren)
3. "You Do Something to Me" (Cole Porter)
4. "It Had to Be You" (Gus Kahn, Isham Jones)
5. "If You Love Me (Really Love Me)" (Geoffrey Parsons, Marguerite Monnot)
6. "At Last" (Harry Warren, Mack Gordon)

== Personnel ==
- Mary Wells - lead vocals
- The Andantes - backing vocals (side 1 tracks 1 - 4, 6; all side 2 tracks)
- The Love-Tones - backing vocals (side 1 tracks 4 - 6)
  - Eddie Holland - backing vocals (with the Love-Tones on "He Holds His Own")
- The Funk Brothers - Instrumentation
