= When I'm Gone (Motown song) =

1964 single by Mary Wells

Single by Mary Wells
- B-side: "Guarantee (For a Lifetime)"
- Released: 1964
- Recorded: Hitsville USA; 1964
- Genre: Soul/pop
- Length: 2:16
- Label: Motown; M 1061
- Songwriter: Smokey Robinson
- Producer: Smokey Robinson

Mary Wells singles chronology
""What's the Matter With You Baby" (with Marvin Gaye)" (1964)	"When I'm Gone" (1964)	"Whisper You Love Me Boy" (1964)

"When I'm Gone"

Single by Brenda Holloway
- B-side: "I've Been Good To You"
- Released: March 6, 1965
- Recorded: 1964, Hitsville USA, Detroit, Michigan
- Genre: R&B, Soul
- Length: 2:11
- Label: Tamla; T 54111
- Songwriter: Smokey Robinson
- Producer: Smokey Robinson

Brenda Holloway singles chronology
"I'll Always Love You" (1964)	"When I'm Gone" (1965)	"Operator" (1965)

"When I'm Gone" is a song written by Smokey Robinson and a single he produced twice, one for early Motown star Mary Wells and the other for fellow Motown vocalist Brenda Holloway. Holloway's version became a hit while Wells' was aborted after the singer left the label in 1964.

== Overview ==
=== Song information ===
"When I'm Gone" was produced under a beat similar to Mary Wells' big hit, "My Guy" though this song included hand claps, and was originally recorded by Wells. In the song, the narrator asks her cheating lover what would he do if she were to leave him explaining how everybody around them thinks they're happy in front of the public when inside the woman is suffering from the lover's behavior calling him a "real Dr. Jekyll and Mr. Hyde" character. She also complains that though he flirts with "every girl that he sees", he comes running back to her when they do him wrong. Throughout the song, the narrator threatens to leave him and in the end repeats the question she asks in the beginning: "what are you gonna do when I'm gone?"

=== Mary Wells' exit and Brenda Holloway's arrival ===
The song was one of the last records Mary Wells recorded while at Motown. Fresh from the success of "My Guy" and with her Motown contract expiring the year of "My Guy" and its success, Wells decided to terminate her contract with Motown complaining of Gordy refusing to give Wells the royalties she earned during her successful tenure at the label. She argued that her Motown contract was invalid because she'd signed with the company at the age of seventeen. Due to the underage clause, Motown allowed Wells' contract to expire. (Had Wells not exited Motown, "When I'm Gone" would have been her next release, the follow-up to the million-selling "My Guy"). The singer then headed to 20th Century Fox Records after being offered a $500,000 contract that also offered Wells to do movies. Meanwhile, Motown's latest new signed artist, Brenda Holloway, was releasing her first single, "Every Little Bit Hurts", which shot to number 13 on the U.S. Billboard Hot 100. After Wells departed, Motown eventually convinced Holloway to record some of Wells' songs, partially due to the fact that Gordy felt Holloway was the next Mary. Holloway recorded "When I'm Gone" in Detroit.

== Charts ==
=== Brenda Holloway version ===
Released as a single in 1965, Holloway's version reached #25 on the U.S. Billboard Hot 100 and performed slightly better on the R&B chart reaching number 12. Holloway performed her version on the show Shivaree Video on YouTube. It was Holloway's second-biggest Motown chart hit, after Every Little Bit Hurts. Wells' version was released to the Motown compilation album, Vintage Stock.

==== Weekly charts ====
Chart (1965)	Peak position
Canada (CHUM Chart) (3 weeks at 12)	12
Canada Top Singles (RPM)	43
US Billboard Hot 100	25
US Hot R&B/Hip-Hop Songs (Billboard)	12

==== Year-end charts ====
Chart (1965)	Rank
US Hot R&B/Hip-Hop Songs (Billboard)	44

== Personnel ==
=== Mary Wells version ===
- Lead vocal by Mary Wells
- Background vocals by The Andantes
- Instrumentation by The Funk Brothers

=== Brenda Holloway version ===
- Lead vocal by Brenda Holloway
- Background vocals by The Andantes
- Instrumentation by The Funk Brothers and the Detroit Symphony Orchestra
