= Two Lovers and Other Great Hits =

Studio album by Mary Wells
- Released: January 31, 1963
- Recorded: 1962
- Studio: Hitsville USA
- Label: Motown
- Producer: Smokey Robinson, Berry Gordy

Mary Wells chronology
The One Who Really Loves You (1962)	Two Lovers and Other Great Hits (1963)	Recorded Live On Stage (1963)

Singles from Two Lovers
- 1. "Two Lovers" Released: October 29, 1962; 2. "Laughing Boy" Released: February 1, 1963

Professional ratings
Review scores
Source	Rating
AllMusic	4.5/5 stars
The Encyclopedia of Popular Music	3/5 stars

Two Lovers and Other Great Hits is an album released by Motown singer Mary Wells, the third album she released while recording for the label. It debuted on the Billboard album chart March 16, 1963 reaching #49, remaining on the chart for eight weeks. The album composed of Wells' third top ten hit, "Two Lovers", the follow-up hit, "Laughing Boy" and the b-side to the "Two Lovers" single, "Operator", the latter song later re-recorded as a minor hit for fellow Motown female crooner, Brenda Holloway.

== Track listing ==
=== Side one ===
1. "Two Lovers" (Smokey Robinson)
2. "Guess Who" (Jo Anne Belvin)
3. "My 2 Arms - You = Tears" (Clarence Paul, William "Mickey" Stevenson, Marvin Gaye)
4. "Goody Goody" (Matty Malneck, Johnny Mercer)
5. "Stop Right Here" (Mary Wells, Melvin Franklin)

=== Side two ===
1. "Laughing Boy" (Smokey Robinson)
2. "Looking Back" (Belford Hendricks, Brook Benton, Clyde Otis)
3. "(I Guess There's) No Love" (Berry Gordy)
4. "Was It Worth It?" (Berry Gordy)
5. "Operator" (Smokey Robinson)

== Personnel ==
- Lead vocal by Mary Wells
- Background vocals by:
  - The Love Tones (on "Two Lovers", "Guess Who", "Laughing Boy" and "Operator")
  - The Andantes (on "Guess Who", "Stop Right Here" and "Laughing Boy")
  - Martha and the Vandellas (on "My 2 Arms - You = Tears")
- Instrumentation by The Funk Brothers
