= The Two Sides of Mary Wells =

Studio album by Mary Wells
- Released: 1966
- Recorded: 1966
- Genre: Soul, R&B, Pop
- Label: Atco
- Producer: Carl Davis

Mary Wells chronology
Love Songs to the Beatles (1965)	The Two Sides of Mary Wells (1966)	Vintage Stock (1966)

Singles from The Two Sides of Mary Wells
- 1. "Dear Lover" Released: 1965

Professional ratings
Review scores
Source	Rating
AllMusic	3/5 stars
The Encyclopedia of Popular Music	3/5 stars

The Two Sides of Mary Wells is the seventh studio album by soul singer Mary Wells, released on the Atco label in 1966. By now, Wells' career had drastically changed from just six years before when the then-teenage Wells first recorded songs for Motown. After being promised a movie deal with 20th Century Fox, Wells had left Motown for the label in 1965 only to find herself struggling to get radio airplay. Rumors were that Motown staff, particularly Berry Gordy, told radio deejays not to play Wells' music on the radio leading to a blacklisting of Wells' music. This album mixed traditional pop with more earthier and uptown soul songs. Wells released a modest hit with the Motown-esque "Dear Lover", which hit the top ten of the R&B chart.

== Track listing ==
=== Side one ===
1. "Satisfaction" (Mick Jagger, Keith Richards)
2. "Love Makes the World Go Round" (Deon Jackson)
3. "In the Midnight Hour" (Steve Cropper, Wilson Pickett)
4. "My World Is Empty Without You" (Holland-Dozier-Holland)
5. "Good Lovin'" (Arthur Resnick, Rudy Clark)
6. "Dear Lover" (Carl Davis, Gerald Sims)

=== Side two ===
1. "Where Am I Going" (Cy Coleman, Dorothy Fields)
2. "Shangri-La" (Carl Sigman, Matty Malneck, Robert Maxwell)
3. "On a Clear Day (You Can See Forever)" (Alan Jay Lerner, Burton Lane)
4. "The Shadow of Your Smile" (Johnny Mandel, Paul Francis Webster)
5. "The Boy from Ipanema" (Antônio Carlos Jobim, Norman Gimbel, Vinicius de Moraes)
6. "Sunrise, Sunset" (Jerry Bock, Sheldon Harnick)

== Personnel ==
- Bob Kidder - engineer
- Sonny Sanders - arranger on Side one
- Joe Mazzu - arranger on Side two
- Gerald Sims - conductor
