= Servin' Up Some Soul =

Studio album by Mary Wells
- Released: 1968
- Recorded: 1967–68
- Genre: R&B; soul
- Label: Jubilee
- Producer: Cecil Womack; Mary Wells Womack; Bobby Womack

Mary Wells chronology
The Two Sides of Mary Wells (1966)	Servin' Up Some Soul (1968)	In and Out of Love (1981)

Singles from Servin' Up Some Soul
- 1. "The Doctor" Released: 1968

Professional ratings
Review scores
Source	Rating
AllMusic	3/5 stars
The Encyclopedia of Popular Music	2/5 stars

Servin' Up Some Soul is the eleventh overall album by R&B singer Mary Wells, released in 1968 on the Jubilee record label. Her first and only release with the once-fabled R&B company (a second Jubilee release was aborted for years) yield a modest charter with "The Doctor", Wells' final top 100 hit on the pop charts though Wells would continue to have R&B hits. It was her final album for thirteen years until 1981's In and Out of Love.

== Track listing ==
All songs were co-written and co-produced by Cecil Womack and Mary Wells except where noted; "Bye Bye Baby '68" was produced by Bobby Womack

1. "Soul Train"
2. "Apples, Peaches, Pumpkin Pie" (Maurice Irby, Jr.) (originally performed by Jay & the Techniques)
3. "Stagger Lee" (Lloyd Price, Harold Logan) (originally performed by Lloyd Price)
4. "Make Me Yours" (Bettye Swann) (originally performed by Bettye Swann)
5. "Two Lovers History"
6. "Can't Get Away from Your Love"
7. "The Doctor"
8. "Don't Look Back"
9. "Sunny" (Bobby Hebb) (originally performed by Bobby Hebb)
10. "Woman in Love"
11. "500 Miles" (Hedy West, Bobby Bare, Curly Williams) (originally performed by Peter, Paul & Mary)
12. "Bye Bye Baby '68" (Wells)

== Personnel ==
- Lead vocals by Mary Wells
- Background vocals by the Valentinos: Bobby Womack, Cecil Womack, Harry Womack, Friendly Womack, Jr. and Curtis Womack and Mary Wells
- Produced by Cecil D. Womack and Mary Wells Womack
