= Graystone Ballroom =

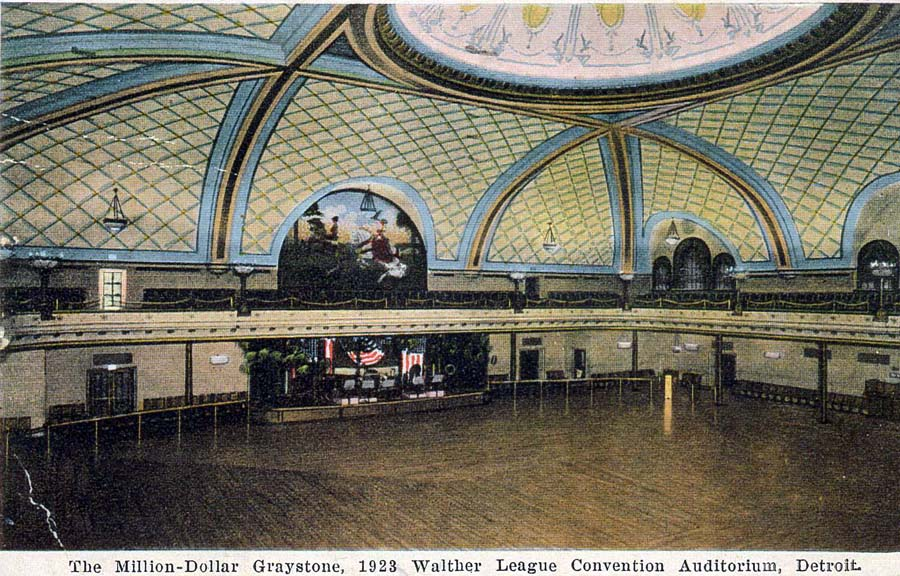

- Location within Michigan
- Alternative names: The Graystone

General information
- Status: Demolished
- Type: Ballroom
- Architectural style: Gothic Revival
- Location: 4237 Woodward Avenue; Detroit, Michigan, United States
- Coordinates: 42.3520°N 83.0607°W
- Opened: 27 February 1922
- Closed: 1972
- Demolished: 19 July 1980

Technical details
- Floor count: 5

Design and construction
- Architect: Rupert W. Koch

The Graystone Ballroom was a dance hall located at 4237 Woodward Avenue in Detroit, Michigan, United States. Billed as "Detroit's Million Dollar Ballroom", it opened its doors on March 7, 1922 with a floorplan designed to hold 3,000 people, making it the largest ballroom of the city at that point. It would become one of the six great ballrooms of the city before the stock market crash of 1929 put a halt to new construction. The others were the Jefferson Ballroom, the Grande Ballroom, the Monticello Ballroom, the Beach Ballroom, the Vanity Ballroom, and the Mirror Ballroom.

In 1980, after decades of decay, neglect, and occupation by vandals, the building was demolished to make way for a McDonald’s location which still stands today.
