= Janie Bradford =

American songwriter (1939–2026)

- Born: June 2, 1939; Charleston, Missouri, U.S.
- Died: August 21, 2026 (aged 87) Los Angeles, California, U.S.
- Genre: Soul
- Occupation: Songwriter
- Years active: 1958–2026
- Label: Motown

Janie Bradford Hobbs (née Bradford; June 2, 1939 – August 21, 2026) was an American songwriter, most known for her tenure with Motown. With Berry Gordy, she co-wrote "Money (That's What I Want)", originally recorded by Barrett Strong, and then by The Beatles on their second album With The Beatles. "Money" is also on The Rolling Stones' first UK EP (January 17, 1964).

== Life and career ==
Janie Bradford was born in Charleston, Missouri, on June 2, 1939. As a child she moved with her family to Detroit as part of the great migration of African Americans out of the rural South. While still in her teens, she was working at Motown Records as a receptionist when she contributed lyrics to "Money (That's What I Want)".

Other hits by Bradford include "Too Busy Thinking About My Baby" by Marvin Gaye (although originally by The Temptations), and later by The Manhattan Transfer with Phil Collins, "Contract On Love" by Little Stevie Wonder and "Your Old Standby" for Mary Wells. She worked at Motown for more than 25 years. Among other notable songs she has written or co‑written are: "I Am Me", recorded by Diana Ross, "All the Love I've Got" and "Tie a String Around Your Finger", both recorded by The Marvelettes, "Don't Compare Me With Her" for Kim Weston, and "Plant a Seed", recorded by The Oak Ridge Boys. She also co-wrote the early Supremes track "Time Changes Things" and one of the final songs recorded by the Supremes, "We Should Be Closer Together".

Bradford moved to Los Angeles in 1970 when Motown transferred operations there. She left the company at the end of that decade. Bradford was the executive director of the Janie Bradford HAL Scholarship Fund and producer of the Heroes And Legends a.k.a. HAL Awards, an annual event that raises funds for performing arts scholarships while paying tribute to entertainment legends, including many of Motown's biggest stars. She also established Twinn Records with songwriter and singer Marilyn McLeod.

Bradford married Wardean Hobbs in 1971. She died at Cedars-Sinai Medical Center in Los Angeles, at the age of 87, after an extended illness on August 21, 2026.
