= Dear Lover =

Single by Mary Wells

from the album The Two Sides of Mary Wells
- Released: 1965
- Recorded: 1965
- Genre: Soul
- Length: 2:08
- Label: Atco
- Songwriters: Carl Davis, Gerald Sims
- Producer: Carl Davis

Mary Wells singles chronology
"Me Without You" (1965)	"Dear Lover" (1965)	"Can't You See (You're Losing Me)" (1966)

"Dear Lover" is a song produced by respected Chicago producer Carl Davis, and written by Davis, along with Gerald Sims It was released as a single by R&B singer Mary Wells, released off her album, The Two Sides of Mary Wells, on the Atco label. Davis was working for the OKeh imprint of Columbia Records at the time, and was moonlighting to record Mary Wells, whom he was dating. The upshot, was he was fired from OKeh.

== Background ==
"Dear Lover" returned Wells to the R&B top ten two years after her two Marvin Gaye singles entered the Cashbox R&B top five and three years after her Motown single, "You Lost the Sweetest Boy", peaked at number ten.

The song was Wells' last R&B top ten of her entire career, though she still had a succession of R&B hits throughout the remainder of her career.

== Chart positions ==
Chart (1965)	Peak position
U.S. Billboard Hot 100	51
U.S. Billboard Top Selling Rhythm & Blues Singles	6
