= Strange Love (song) =

Single by Mary Wells

from the album The One Who Really Loves You
- B-side: "Come to Me"
- Released: 1961
- Recorded: 1961, Hitsville USA
- Genre: Soul
- Length: 2:41
- Label: Motown
- Songwriter(s): William "Mickey" Stevenson; George Gordy
- Producer(s): Mickey Stevenson

Mary Wells singles chronology
"I Don't Want to Take a Chance" (1961)	"Strange Love" (1961)	"The One Who Really Loves You" (1962)

"Strange Love" is a song that was issued as the third single by Motown singer Mary Wells. The song would be later issued on Wells' second album, The One Who Really Loves You.

== Song information ==
The song talks of a woman who says despite the fact she has separated from a former lover, she still has emotions for him often recalling memories of the lover and says the harder she tries to get rid of the memories, the more she wants him back. It was a rare ballad released by the teenage crooner.

== Charts ==
Released shortly after her second single, "I Don't Want to Take a Chance" became her first top 40 hit in 1961, the single failed to chart which resulted in Motown CEO Berry Gordy hiring different writers to give Wells a more polished pop sound, finally finding the answer in Smokey Robinson. This song was composed by Mickey Stevenson and George Gordy.

== Personnel ==
- Lead vocals by Mary Wells
- Background vocals by The Andantes (Jackie Hicks, Marlene Barrow, and Louvain Demps) and The Love-Tones (Carl Jones, Joe Miles, and Stan Bracely)
- Instrumentation by The Funk Brothers
