= Bye Bye Baby I Don't Want to Take a Chance =

Studio album by Mary Wells
- Released: November 1961
- Recorded: 1960–61
- Studio: Hitsville USA
- Genre: Soul
- Label: Motown
- Producer: Berry Gordy, Mickey Stevenson

Mary Wells chronology
Bye Bye Baby I Don't Want to Take a Chance (1961)	The One Who Really Loves You (1962)

Singles from Bye Bye Baby I Don't Want to Take a Chance
- 1. "Bye Bye Baby" Released: September 1960; 2. "I Don't Want to Take a Chance" Released: June 3, 1961

Bye Bye Baby I Don't Want to Take a Chance is the debut album by Motown recording artist Mary Wells, released on Motown in 1961. The album didn't chart but yielded two hit singles for the teenaged Wells including "Bye Bye Baby", issued in late 1960 (which she had originally written as a demo for Jackie Wilson), and "I Don't Want to Take a Chance", a song written for her by Berry Gordy and Mickey Stevenson. Wells' follow-up album, The One Who Really Loves You, was released in 1962.

== Track listing ==
=== Side one ===
1. "Come to Me" (Berry Gordy, Jr., Marv Johnson)
2. "I Don't Want to Take a Chance" (Gordy, William "Mickey" Stevenson)
3. "Bye Bye Baby" (Mary Wells)
4. "Shop Around" (Smokey Robinson, Gordy)
5. "I Love the Way You Love" (Gordy, John Oden, Stanley Mike Ossman)

=== Side two ===
1. "I'm Gonna Stay" (Gordy)
2. "Let Your Conscience Be Your Guide" (Gordy)
3. "Bad Boy" (Robinson, Gordy)
4. "I'm So Sorry" (Gordy, Earl Brooks)
5. "Please Forgive Me" (Gordy)

== Personnel ==
- Mary Wells: lead vocal
- The Andantes: background vocals (on "Come to Me", "I Love the Way You Love", "Let Your Conscience Be Your Guide")
- The Supremes: background vocals ("I'm Gonna Stay", "Bad Boy")
- The Love Tones (Carl Jones, Joe Miles and Stan Bracely): background vocals (on "Shop Around")
- The Rayber Voices (Raynoma Liles Gordy, Brian Holland, Robert Bateman and Sonny Sanders): background vocals (on "Bye Bye Baby")
  - Robert Bateman also provides backing vocals on "Come to Me"
- Instrumentation by The Funk Brothers
