= The One Who Really Loves You =

Studio album by Mary Wells
- Released: June 1962
- Recorded: 1961–62
- Studio: Hitsville USA
- Genre: Soul
- Label: Motown
- Producer: Berry Gordy, Smokey Robinson, Mickey Stevenson

Mary Wells chronology
Bye Bye Baby I Don't Want to Take a Chance (1961)	The One Who Really Loves You (1962)	Two Lovers and Other Great Hits (1963)

Singles from The One Who Really Loves You
- 1. "Strange Love" Released: October 6, 1961; 2. "The One Who Really Loves You" Released: February 8, 1962; 3. "You Beat Me to the Punch" Released: July 17, 1962

Professional ratings
Review scores
Source	Rating
AllMusic	3/5 stars
The Encyclopedia of Popular Music	3/5 stars

The One Who Really Loves You is the second album recorded by R&B singer and Motown recording artist Mary Wells, released in 1962 on the Motown label. The album featured the hits, "The One Who Really Loves You" and "You Beat Me to the Punch" and other singles such as the ballads "Strange Love" and "Two Wrongs Don't Make a Right".

== Track listing ==
=== Side one ===
1. "The One Who Really Loves You" (William "Smokey" Robinson)
2. "Two Wrongs Don't Make a Right" (Berry Gordy, Jr., William "Smokey" Robinson)
3. "You Beat Me to the Punch" (Ronald White, William "Smokey" Robinson)
4. "I've Got a Notion" (Brian Holland, George Fowler, Robert Bateman)
5. "The Day Will Come" (Brian Holland, Robert Bateman)

=== Side two ===
1. "Strange Love" (Mickey Stevenson, George Gordy)
2. "You're My Desire" (Rex Robertson, William "Smokey" Robinson)
3. "I'll Still Be Around" (Janie Bradford, Richard "Popcorn" Wylie)
4. "She Don't Love You" (William "Smokey" Robinson)
5. "Drifting Love" (Mary Wells)

== Personnel ==
- Mary Wells - lead vocals
- The Love Tones - backing vocals (on "The One Who Really Loves You", "You Beat Me to the Punch", "Strange Love" and "You're My Desire")
- The Andantes - backing vocals (on "The Day Will Come", "Strange Love" and "She Don't Love You")
- Robert Bateman - backing vocals (on "She Don't Love You")
- The Funk Brothers - instrumentation
