= What Love Has Joined Together =

Song
- Released: 1963
- Genre: R&B
- Label: Motown
- Songwriter(s): Smokey Robinson; Bobby Rogers

"What Love Has Joined Together" is a song written and composed by Miracles members Smokey Robinson and Bobby Rogers, and was recorded by six Motown acts: Mary Wells, The Temptations, Smokey Robinson & The Miracles, Barbara McNair, Syreeta, and Queen Latifah (after her years at Motown) and was issued as B-sides to hits by Wells and The Temptations; "Your Old Standby" for Wells, released in 1963, and "It's Growing" by The Temptations, released in 1965.

== Song information ==
The song talks about a person professing their love to their loved one regardless of people's comments trying to separate them, with the person stressing the point that "what love has joined together can nobody take it apart". The song was originally recorded by the Miracles in 1962. Wells would record her version a year later while the Temptations covered it for their The Temptations Sing Smokey album in 1965. Barbara McNair recorded her version in 1968 for a proposed album "Barbara McNair Sings Smokey." It remained unreleased until 2004. Syreeta's version appeared on her debut album for Motown's MoWest label which was released in 1972. The Miracles also would record a special extended version of the song in 1970, as the title cut from their album of the same name. (See What Love Has...Joined Together ) . Queen Latifah's version appeared on her 2007 "Trav'lin Light" CD.

== Personnel ==
=== Mary Wells version ===
- Lead vocals by Mary Wells
- Background vocals by the Love Tones
- Instrumentation by the Funk Brothers

=== The Temptations version ===
- Lead vocals by Eddie Kendricks
- Background vocals by Paul Williams, David Ruffin, Melvin Franklin and Otis Williams
- Instrumentation by the Funk Brothers

=== Barbara McNair version ===
- Lead vocals by Barbara McNair
- Background vocals by the Andantes
- Instrumentation by LA musicians

=== The Miracles version ===
- Lead vocals by Smokey Robinson
- Background vocals by Claudette Rogers Robinson, Ronnie White, Pete Moore and Bobby Rogers
- Guitar by Marv Tarplin
- Other instrumentation by the Funk Brothers

=== Syreeta version ===
- Vocals by Syreeta
- Instrumentation by Stevie Wonder

=== Queen Latifah version ===
- Vocals by Queen Latifah
- No further information available
