= Laughing Boy (song) =

Single by Mary Wells

from the album Two Lovers
- B-side: "Two Wrongs Don't Make a Right"
- Released: 1963
- Recorded: Hitsville USA, 1962
- Genre: Soul, pop
- Length: 2:54
- Label: Motown
- Songwriter(s): Smokey Robinson
- Producer(s): Smokey Robinson

Mary Wells singles chronology
"Two Lovers" (1963)	"Laughing Boy" (1963)	"Your Old Standby" (1963)

"Laughing Boy" is a song written and produced by Smokey Robinson and recorded and released as a single by early Motown star Mary Wells in 1963. The single is notable for being the song to break a consecutive streak of top ten hits Wells had scored between mid-1962 and early-1963.

== Overview ==
=== Song information ===
In this song, the narrator consoles her boyfriend whom she feels is feeling "gloomy and blue" despite his public image that shows him in a happier mood. Appearing to think she doesn't love him, Wells tries pleading to her boyfriend to "smile once more" saying she still loves him "as she did before". The song features background singers imitating the man's appropriated laughter in a solemn tone.

=== Release and reaction ===
When the song was set for release, Motown executives were confident the record would continue Wells' streak of top ten hits which included "The One Who Really Loves You", "You Beat Me to the Punch" and "Two Lovers". However, the single stalled at number 15 on the Billboard Hot 100 and number 6 on the Hot R&B charts. In spite of its failure not to reach the top ten, the song is still revered as a classic.

Cash Box described it as "a captivating cha cha beat opus...that the canary delivers with a soft, ear-appealing 'Two Lovers' flavor," saying Wells gets "strong vocal support from [the] Andantes [and the] Love-Tones."

== Personnel ==
- Lead vocal by Mary Wells
- Background vocals by The Andantes and The Love Tones
- Instrumentation by The Funk Brothers
