= What's Easy for Two Is Hard for One =

Single by Mary Wells

from the album Mary Wells' Greatest Hits
- B-side: "You Lost the Sweetest Boy"
- Released: 1963
- Recorded: 1963
- Genre: Soul, pop
- Label: Motown
- Songwriter(s): Smokey Robinson
- Producer(s): Smokey Robinson

Mary Wells singles chronology
"Your Old Standby" (1963)	"What's Easy for Two Is Hard for One" (1963)	"You Lost the Sweetest Boy" (1963)

"What's Easy for Two Is Hard for One" (also known as "What's Easy for Two Is So Hard for One") is a song written and produced by Smokey Robinson and released as a single by singer Mary Wells for the Motown label.

== Song information ==
In this song, the narrator is longing for a longtime partnership with a suitor and constantly begs the man to "take her to the preacher man" in hopes the couple does "what should be done" because "what two can easily do is so hard to be done by one".

== Release and reaction ==
Released in mid-1963, the song returned Wells to the top 30 where it peaked at number 29 on the Billboard Hot 100 (and #8 R&B). Wells covered the song at least two more times.

== Covers ==
"What's Easy for Two Is Hard For One" is one of the most covered Motown songs within the company.

- The Temptations recorded a version in 1965. Remained unreleased until 1999.
- The Marvelettes recorded a version in 1966. It was released in 1968 (#114 U.S. Pop).
- Connie Haines released a version in 1966.
- Barbara Randolph recorded a version in 1966.
- Lulu recorded a version for Decca Records in 1964.
- The Intruders recorded a version for their 1974 album, Energy of Love.

== Personnel ==
=== Mary Wells' version ===
- Lead vocals by Mary Wells
- Backing vocals by The Andantes: Jackie Hicks, Marlene Barrow, and Louvain Demps
- Instrumentation by The Funk Brothers

=== Temptations' version ===
- Lead vocals by Paul Williams
- Backing vocals by Eddie Kendricks, David Ruffin, Otis Williams, and Melvin Franklin
- Instrumentation by The Funk Brothers

=== Connie Haines' version ===
- Lead vocals by Connie Haines
- Backing vocals by The Andantes
- Instrumentation by The Funk Brothers and the Detroit Symphony Orchestra

=== Marvelettes' version ===
- Lead vocals by Wanda Young
- Backing vocals by The Andantes
- Instrumentation by The Funk Brothers
