= Whisper You Love Me Boy =

Song written and composed by Holland–Dozier–Holland

Single by The Supremes

from the album More Hits by The Supremes
- A-side: "Back in My Arms Again"
- Released: April 15, 1965 (U.S.)
- Studio: Hitsville U.S.A., Detroit
- Genre: Pop, rhythm and blues
- Length: 2:38
- Label: Motown; M 1075
- Songwriter: Holland–Dozier–Holland
- Producers: Brian Holland; Lamont Dozier

"Whisper You Love Me Boy"

Single by Chris Clark

from the album Soul Sounds
- B-side: "The Beginning of the End"
- Released: 1968
- Length: 2:12
- Label: Motown; M 1121
- Songwriter: Holland–Dozier–Holland
- Producers: Brian Holland; Lamont Dozier

"Whisper You Love Me Boy" is a song written and composed by Holland–Dozier–Holland and recorded by at least three Motown female acts: early Motown star Mary Wells, popular Motown singing group The Supremes and blue-eyed soul Motown label mate Chris Clark in 1964, 1965 and 1967 respectively.

== Song information ==
The song was first scheduled to be released as a single in 1964 by Mary Wells as the proposed follow-up to Wells' popular "My Guy" (catalogue # M-1056), but the singer was embroiled in a controversial lawsuit with Motown arguing for release from the label. Because of her abrupt exit from Motown in 1965, her version of the single was shelved for release. The song is featured on Wells' final Motown studio album released in 1966, Mary Wells Sings My Guy (catalogue # MT 617/S 617). In 1965 The Supremes recorded it for their popular album, More Hits by The Supremes (catalogue # MT 627/S 627). The song was also placed on the b-side of their number-one hit, "Back In My Arms Again" (catalogue # M-1075). In 1967, Chris Clark recorded the song for her Motown album Soul Sounds (catalogue # M 664/S 664) and in 1968 it was also issued as a single (catalogue # M-1121) on the same label but failed to chart.

== Other Versions ==
The song was recorded by Cindy Gibson on Artic Records 104 (Philadelphia), released in February 1965, as the B-side to the track, "Step By Step".

Nella Dodds also recorded a version of the song in 1965, to be released on her proposed album "This is a Girl's Life". The year before, Dodds released another Motown cover, Come See About Me, which was later released by The Supremes.

== Credits ==
=== Mary Wells version ===
- Lead vocal by Mary Wells
- Background vocals by The Andantes
- Instrumentation by The Funk Brothers

=== The Supremes version ===
- Lead vocal by Diana Ross
- Background vocals by Florence Ballard and Mary Wilson
- Instrumentation by the Funk Brothers

=== Chris Clark version ===
- Lead vocal by Chris Clark
- Background vocals by The Andantes
- Instrumentation by The Funk Brothers
