= Bye Bye Baby (Mary Wells song) =

Single by Mary Wells

from the album Bye Bye Baby I Don't Want to Take a Chance
- B-side: "Please Forgive Me"
- Released: December 1960
- Recorded: July 8, 1960
- Studio: United Sound (Detroit)
- Genre: R&B, soul
- Length: 3:00
- Label: Motown
- Songwriter(s): Mary Wells
- Producer(s): Berry Gordy

Mary Wells singles chronology
"Bye Bye Baby" (1960)	"I Don't Want to Take a Chance" (1961)

"Bye Bye Baby" is the first single by R&B singer Mary Wells, released in December 1960 on the Motown label. The song was one of Motown's earliest hit singles and showcased a much rougher vocal than the singer had during her later years.

== History ==
=== Recording ===
In 1960, Wells, then just 17 years of age, was a nightclub singer who was struggling to make ends meet in Detroit. She aspired to be a songwriter as well, so she wrote a song for fellow Detroiter and R&B singer Jackie Wilson. She saw Berry Gordy while attempting to deliver "Bye Bye, Baby" to Wilson, and asked Gordy to give Wilson her song. But Gordy, having severed ties with Wilson's manager to form Motown, asked Wells to sing it herself for Motown. Mary recorded "Bye Bye Baby" in her version of Jackie Wilson's style. Reports claim that the teen had to record the song 26 times or more before Gordy had a version he approved for release. At certain points in the song you can hear the hoarseness and exhaustion in her voice. According to Detroit music mogul Johnnie Mae Matthews, Wells had come to her with four lines of the song, which Matthews said she finished up. When the song was issued, she didn't get a songwriting credit.

=== Release and reaction ===
Released in December 1960, the song became a hit, peaking at number 8 on the Billboard Hot R&B Sides chart for the week of February 20, 1961. It spent 15 weeks on the chart after debuting in December 1960, not too long after its release.

It crossed over to the pop singles chart as well, peaking at number 45 on the Billboard Hot 100 for the week of April 10, 1961. It would stay on the chart for 11 weeks following its debut for the week of January 30. It also reached number 41 on the Cash Box pop singles chart.

It was significant as the first single released under one of the Motown subsidiaries nationally after the label's first singles were released through distributing labels such as United Artists.

== Covers ==
American all-female rock group Goldie and the Gingerbreads recorded their version in December, 1963 but it was not released until the 1990s.

The song was covered in 1965 by soul singer Betty Everett, in 1966 by Tony Jackson and the Vibrations and in 1979 by rock musician Bonnie Raitt. Wells remade it for her 1968 album, Servin' Up Some Soul. The 1968 re-recording was produced by Bobby Womack. Wells re-recorded it again for her 1983 album I'm a Lady: The Old, New & Best of Mary Wells. Cher performed the song on her "Love Hurts Tour" in 1992. The song was covered in 2001 by The Detroit Cobras.

The song features on the soundtrack for the 1991 film The Commitments, as sung by Maria Doyle Kennedy.

== Personnel ==
- Lead vocals by Mary Wells
- Background vocals by The Rayber Voices (Raynoma Liles Gordy, Brian Holland, Sonny Sanders, and Robert Bateman)
- Instrumentation by The Funk Brothers
- Written by Mary Wells
- Produced by Berry Gordy
