= Your Old Standby =

Single by Mary Wells

from the album Mary Wells' Greatest Hits
- B-side: "What Love Has Joined Together"
- Released: 1963
- Recorded: 1963, Hitsville USA
- Genre: Soul
- Label: Motown
- Songwriter(s): Smokey Robinson; Janie Bradford
- Producer(s): Smokey Robinson

Mary Wells singles chronology
"Laughing Boy" (1963)	"Your Old Standby" (1963)	"What's So Easy for Two Is So Hard for One" (1963)

"Your Old Standby" is a song written by Motown songwriters Smokey Robinson and Janie Bradford and released as a single by Motown star Mary Wells in 1963. The record marked her third top forty pop single to come out in 1963.

== Song information ==
In the song, the narrator opens up about a man who is still in a troubling relationship with one woman while having a relationship with another woman. The other woman struggles to comprehend why her lover refuses to leave his past flame so she could "be with him permanently" as she puts it in the end.

== Chart performance ==
After the successful but modest response to "Laughing Boy", this song was rushed trying to compete with that record's top 15 peak. However, this song got as high as number 40 on the Billboard Hot 100 (it did however reached number 8 on the U.S. R&B chart). Wells' next Robinson-penned hit, "What's So Easy for Two is Hard for One" would fare better.

Chart (1963)	Peak position
US Billboard Hot 100	40
US Billboard Hot R&B Singles	8

== Personnel ==
- Lead vocal by Mary Wells
- Background vocals by The Andantes (Jackie Hicks, Louvain Demps, and Marlene Barrow)
- Instrumentation by The Funk Brothers
