= Operator (Motown song) =

Motown song

Single by Mary Wells

from the album Vintage Stock
- A-side: "Two Lovers"
- Released: 1963
- Recorded: 1962
- Genre: Soul/pop
- Length: 2:46
- Label: Motown; M 1035
- Songwriter: Smokey Robinson
- Producer: Smokey Robinson

"Operator"

Single by Brenda Holloway
- B-side: "I'll Be Available"
- Released: 1965
- Recorded: 1964
- Genre: Soul
- Length: 3:08
- Label: Tamla; T 54115
- Songwriter: Smokey Robinson
- Producer: Smokey Robinson

Brenda Holloway singles chronology
"When I'm Gone" (1964)	"Operator" (1965)	"You Can Cry On My Shoulder" (1965)

"Operator" is a Motown song recorded by vocalists Mary Wells and Brenda Holloway. The Wells version was the b-side to her top ten hit, "Two Lovers" while Holloway's version was issued as a single in 1965.

== Overview ==
=== Song information ===
In the song, written by Smokey Robinson of The Miracles, the narrator expresses her desire for the phone operator to connect her with her boyfriend, who is supposedly on the other end of the line. However, to her dismay, the operator encounters difficulty reaching him, resulting in static. Throughout the difficulties, the narrator pleads with the operator to "put him on the line".

== Charts ==
=== Brenda Holloway version ===
Brenda Holloway's version of the song, which is produced under a more soulful rendition than Wells' teen pop-styled version from three years before, reached number 78 on the Billboard Hot 100 and number 36 on the R&B singles chart.

Chart (1967)	Peak position
Canada Top Singles (RPM)	14
UK R&B (Record Mirror)	17
US Billboard Hot 100	78
US Hot R&B/Hip-Hop Songs (Billboard)	36

== Credits ==
=== Mary Wells version ===
- Lead vocal by Mary Wells
- Background vocals by The Love Tones
- Instrumentation by The Funk Brothers

=== Brenda Holloway version ===
- Lead vocal by Brenda Holloway
- Background vocals by The Andantes
- Instrumentation by The Funk Brothers
