= I Don't Want to Take a Chance =

Single by Mary Wells

from the album Bye Bye Baby/I Don't Want to Take a Chance
- B-side: "I'm So Sorry"
- Released: June 1961
- Recorded: March 1961
- Studio: Hitsville U.S.A. (Detroit)
- Genre: Soul
- Length: 2:49
- Label: Motown
- Songwriter(s): Berry Gordy; William "Mickey" Stevenson
- Producer(s): Berry Gordy

Mary Wells singles chronology
"Bye Bye Baby" (1960)	"I Don't Want to Take a Chance" (1961)	"Strange Love" (1961)

"I Don't Want to Take a Chance" is a single released by Mary Wells in 1961 on the Motown label. It was the second single release from Wells, who hit the charts with her Jackie Wilson-esque "Bye Bye Baby".

While that song was able to reach the top fifty of the pop singles chart, the string-laden follow-up performed better reaching number thirty-three on the US pop chart and peaking at number-nine on the R&B singles chart.

The song became one of the first nationally released Motown singles to reach the top forty on the pop chart after Barrett Strong's "Money (That's What I Want)" and The Miracles' "Shop Around".

== Personnel ==
- Vocal by Mary Wells
- Instrumentation by The Funk Brothers
- Strings played by assorted musicians
- Written by Berry Gordy and William "Mickey" Stevenson
- Produced by Berry Gordy
