= The One Who Really Loves You (song) =

Single by Mary Wells

from the album The One Who Really Loves You
- B-side: "I'm Gonna Stay"
- Released: February 8, 1962
- Recorded: Hitsville USA; 1961
- Genre: Soul
- Length: 2:30
- Label: Motown
- Songwriter: Smokey Robinson
- Producer: Smokey Robinson

Mary Wells singles chronology
"Strange Love" (1961)	"The One Who Really Loves You" (1962)	"You Beat Me to the Punch" (1962)

"The One Who Really Loves You" is a single recorded by Mary Wells on the Motown label in 1962 and released on her album of the same name. It was written and composed by Smokey Robinson of The Miracles and peaked at number eight on the Billboard Hot 100 chart and number two on the Billboard R&B chart.

The song, written by Smokey Robinson, talks about a woman who's telling her boyfriend not to fall for other girls, because they don't want him, and their love isn't true, but hers is, so she's telling him that he "better wake up" before they "break up".

The single was the first of a trio of top ten hits Wells had with Robinson in the year (followed by "You Beat Me to the Punch" and "Two Lovers"). It featured vibraphone production and brought out a softer sound in Wells' voice that hadn't been shown in her earlier releases. The single was the highest-charting single of her career at the time.

Jessica Sanchez sampled the song for her song "Still in Love".

== Personnel ==
- Lead vocal by Mary Wells
- Background vocals by The Love Tones (Carl Jones, Joe Miles, and Stan Bracely)
- Instrumentation by The Funk Brothers
- Written and produced by Smokey Robinson
