= You Beat Me to the Punch =

Single by Mary Wells

from the album The One Who Really Loves You
- B-side: "Old Love (Let's Try It Again)"
- Released: July 17, 1962
- Recorded: February 23, 1962
- Studio: Hitsville USA
- Genre: Soul
- Length: 2:45
- Label: Motown
- Songwriter(s): Smokey Robinson, Ronald White
- Producer(s): Smokey Robinson

Mary Wells singles chronology
"The One Who Really Loves You" (1962)	"You Beat Me to the Punch" (1962)	"Two Lovers" (1962)

"You Beat Me to the Punch" is a soul single by Motown singer Mary Wells, released on the Motown label in 1962. It was co-written by Smokey Robinson of the Miracles, who was responsible for most of the hits released by Wells, along with another Miracles member, Ronnie White, during her time as a Motown artist.

Following the success of the previous single, "The One Who Really Loves You", Motown released "You Beat Me to the Punch" shortly after it was produced. The song performed similarly to "The One Who Really Loves You", becoming a Billboard Top 10 Pop smash, peaking at number nine on the pop chart, and becoming her first number one hit on the Billboard R&B singles chart. It also earned Wells a Grammy nomination for Best Rock and Roll Recording.

Like "The One Who Really Loves You", this song featured a mock-calypso beat. It inspired an "answer" song by soul singer Gene Chandler called "You Threw A Lucky Punch" which used the same music but different lyrics and became a hit on both Pop and R&B charts that year.

== Personnel ==
- Lead vocal by Mary Wells
- Background vocals by the Love Tones (Carl Jones, Joe Miles, and Stan Bracely)
- Written and produced by Smokey Robinson and Ronnie White
- Instrumentation by The Funk Brothers

== Trivia ==
In DTV, "You Threw A Lucky Punch" was set to Toby Tortoise Returns.
This song was used in the movie Boulevard Nights.
