= Two Lovers (Mary Wells song) =

Single by Mary Wells

from the album Two Lovers
- B-side: "Operator"
- Released: October 29, 1962
- Studio: Hitsville USA, Detroit, Michigan
- Genre: Soul
- Length: 2:45
- Label: Motown
- Songwriter: Smokey Robinson
- Producer: Smokey Robinson

Mary Wells singles chronology
"You Beat Me to the Punch" (1962)	"Two Lovers" (1962)	"Laughing Boy" (1963)

"Two Lovers" is a single released in 1962 by Mary Wells on the Motown record label. The song was the third consecutive hit to be both written and produced by Smokey Robinson of the Miracles and recorded by Mary Wells, the two previous charters being "The One Who Really Loves You" and "You Beat Me to the Punch." The song's cleverly devised lyrics at first appear to be about a girl singing to one lover who is "sweet and kind" and a second who treats her bad and makes her sad; eventually, the girl reveals that the two lovers are actually the same person. The song became Wells's most successful release to date, reaching number one on the Billboard R&B chart and number seven on the Billboard pop chart. Its success would be eclipsed two years later by the singer's most successful release, "My Guy."

Cash Box said that "Two Lovers" is "in the soft beat cha cha groove of her recent smasheroo, 'You Beat Me to the Punch'" and said that Wells sings "against an attention-getting ork-choral backdrop, that she has a 'Two Lovers' problem in her split-personality guy."

== Personnel ==
- Lead and harmony vocals by Mary Wells
- Background vocals by The Love Tones (Joe Miles and Stan Bracely, with Eddie Kendricks of The Temptations)
- Written and produced by Smokey Robinson
- Instrumentation by The Funk Brothers

== Covers ==
- Louise Cordet covered the song in 1964 in a Decca session with Jimmy Page.
- Steve Goodman covered the song on his 1977 Say It In Private album and in concert.
- Dolly Parton covered the song on her 1987 pop album Rainbow.
- La Toya Jackson covered the song along with "My Guy" on her 1995 Motown cover album, Stop in the Name of Love.
- The Disney Channel featured the song in a DTV music video set entirely to clips from the 1936 Mickey Mouse cartoon, Mickey's Rival, and was featured on the VHS DTV: Love Songs.

== See also ==
- List of number-one R&B singles of 1963 (U.S.)
