= Mary Wells =

American singer (1943–1992)

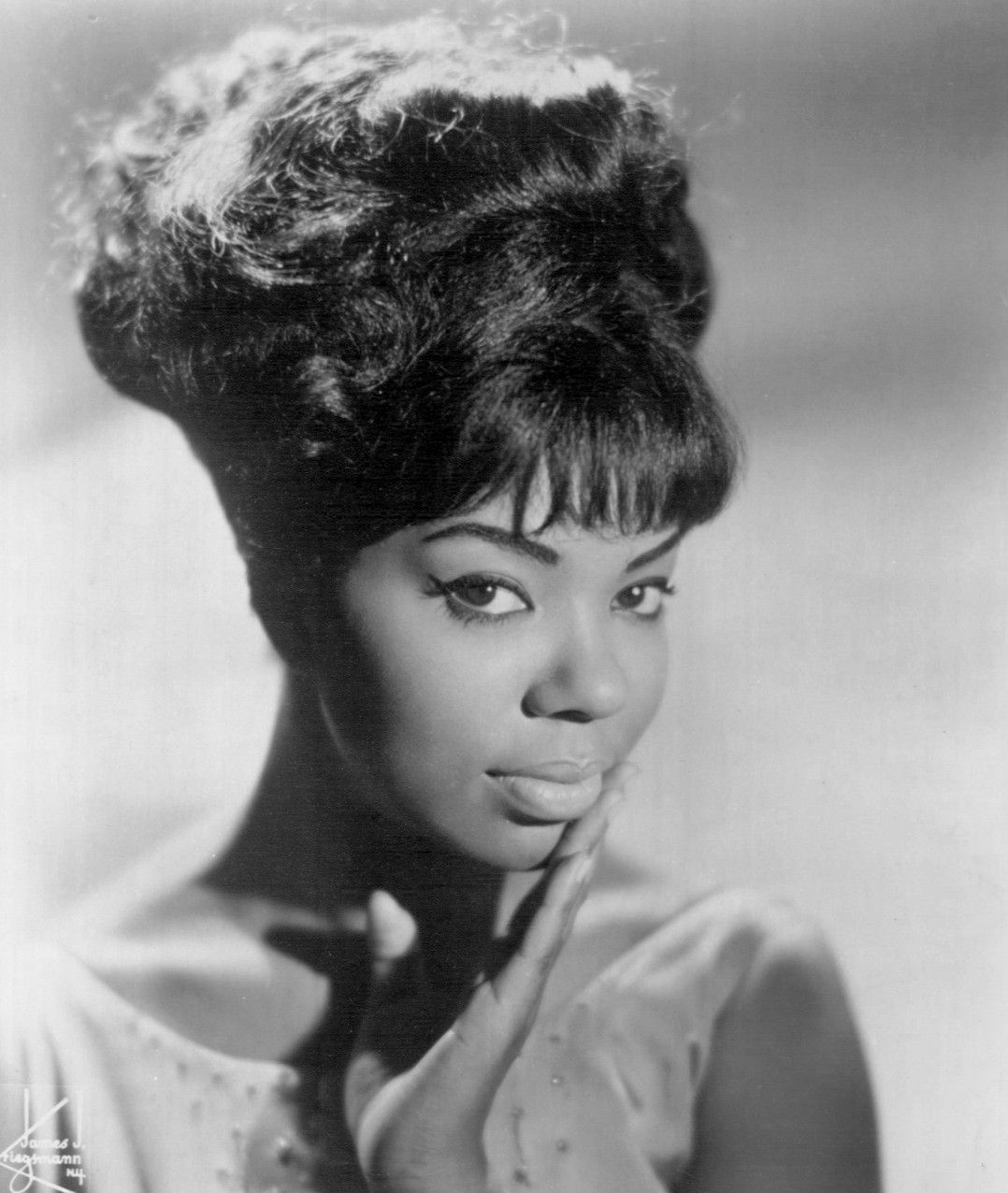
- Wells in 1965

Background information
- Also known as: Mary Wells Womack
- Born: Mary Esther Wells; May 13, 1943; Detroit, Michigan, U.S.
- Died: July 26, 1992 (aged 49) Los Angeles, California, U.S.
- Genres: R&B; pop; soul; disco
- Occupation: Singer-songwriter
- Years active: 1960–1990
- Labels: Motown; 20th Century Fox; Atco; Jubilee; Reprise; Epic; Motorcity

Mary Esther Wells (May 13, 1943 – July 26, 1992) was an American singer who helped to define the emerging sound of Motown in the early 1960s.

Signing with Motown at the age of 17, Wells's best-known hit singles include "The One Who Really Loves You", "Two Lovers" and "You Beat Me to the Punch". Her signature hit, "My Guy" (1964), was her biggest international single and her only number-one hit on the Billboard Hot 100. During Wells's Motown tenure, she was nicknamed "the Queen of Motown".

Wells's early success with Motown led her to become part of the era's surge in black music on radio stations and record shelves in mainstream America, "bridging the color lines in music at the time".

Wells left Motown shortly after "My Guy" peaked at number one, and she subsequently struggled to release songs through big and small record labels until her death from cancer in June 1992. Wells was nominated for induction into the Rock and Roll Hall of Fame in 1987 and was later inducted into the National Rhythm and Blues Hall of Fame.

== Life and career ==
=== 1943–1961: Early life and career ===
Mary Esther Wells was born near Detroit's Wayne State University on May 13, 1943, to Geneva Campbell Wells, a mother who worked as a domestic, and Arthur Wells, an absentee father. One of three children, she contracted spinal meningitis at the age of two and struggled with partial blindness, deafness in one ear and temporary paralysis. At age 10, Wells contracted tuberculosis. During her early years, Wells lived in Black Bottom and struggled with poverty. By age 12, she was helping her mother with house cleaning work.

Wells used singing as her comfort from her pain, first singing in a Detroit Baptist church at the age of ten. By her teen years, she participated in talent shows. But Wells initially had no plans to be a professional singer until Detroit-based artists Little Willie John, Jackie Wilson and The Miracles began having mainstream hits. By the late 1950s, R&B and doo-wop groups formed all over the city and Wells unsuccessfully tried joining several groups. Wells eventually was discovered by Johnnie Mae Matthews in 1960, who signed her to her Northern Records label. Despite the promise of producing her, Wells left after Matthews failed to book a session due to Matthews's attention on the Distants, led by future Temptations founder Otis Williams.

Following her graduation from Northwestern High School in June 1960, Wells sought to be a songwriter and penned a song titled "Bye Bye Baby" in the hopes of her idol Jackie Wilson singing it. With the help of Robert Bateman, who was working with Wilson's former songwriter and Tamla Records founder Berry Gordy, Wells spotted Gordy at Detroit's 20 Grand nightclub the following month, where he was busy with his acts Marv Johnson and the Miracles and eventually presented the song to a weary Gordy who ordered her to sing the song, to which Wells did.

Impressed by Wells's performance, he offered Wells a record deal with his recently formed Motown imprint, a subsidiary of his first label, Tamla. Wells signed the following day on July 8 with her mother present and recorded 22 takes of "Bye Bye Baby" at United Sound Systems. The song was released in December 1960 and became Wells's first chart hit, reaching number 8 on the Billboard Hot R&B Sides chart in January 1961 and crossed over to number 45 on the Billboard Hot 100 in April of the same year, prior to Wells turning 18.

Wells's next chart hit, the string-flavored pop-soul song, "I Don't Want to Take a Chance", written for her by William "Mickey" Stevenson, reached number 9 on the R&B Sides chart and number 33 on the Hot 100 in August 1961. But her next single, the ballad "Strange Love", failed to make either chart. In November 1961, Wells's debut album, Bye Bye Baby I Don't Want to Take a Chance, also failed to chart.

=== 1962–1964: Commercial success ===
Gordy assigned Smokey Robinson to compose Wells's next single. Inspired by the calypso pop of Harry Belafonte, as well as the growing girl group craze of that period, Robinson composed the pop song "The One Who Really Loves You", which Wells sung under a softer, sweeter tone. Released in February 1962, the song was an immediate hit, reaching number two on the R&B Sides chart and number eight on the Hot 100. This was followed by "You Beat Me to the Punch" a few months later. The song became her first number one Billboard R&B hit and her second top ten pop hit, peaking at number nine on the Billboard Hot 100. Wells earned a Grammy Award nomination for the song in the Best Rock & Roll Recording category in 1963, becoming the first Motown artist to receive a Grammy nomination.

In late 1962, the Robinson-composed "Two Lovers" was released as the next single and became her third consecutive top ten single on the Hot 100, peaking at number seven and became her second R&B number one. "Two Lovers" became her first million-selling single and Wells was awarded a gold disc. In October 1962, Wells was the major headliner of the first Motortown Revue, where her energetic performances were often the highlight of the Revue.

Throughout 1963, Wells continued to enjoy success. Her third studio album, Two Lovers and Other Great Hits, became her first charted album, peaking at number 49 on the Billboard Top LPs chart. Wells's next hit, "Laughing Boy", broke her top ten streak, peaking at number 15 on the Hot 100. After the follow-up, "Your Old Standby", barely cracked the top 40, Wells began working with Holland-Dozier-Holland, resulting in the rock-inflected hit "You Lost the Sweetest Boy" while enjoying a double sided hit with the song and the Robinson-penned "What's Easy for Two Is Hard for One".

In March 1964, Motown released the Robinson-composed "My Guy" and in May, the song became Wells's first and only number one single on the Billboard Hot 100, replacing Louis Armstrong's "Hello, Dolly!" at the top spot, staying there for two weeks. Both singles were notable for breaking the Beatles' uninterrupted fourteen-week streak inside the top ten of the Billboard Hot 100. "My Guy" became Wells's second million-seller. Wells would release two albums that featured the hit -- Greatest Hits and Mary Wells Sings My Guy. Both albums made the Billboard Top LPs chart, with the former album peaking at number 18, which made it her only top 40 album.

Around the same time, Wells recorded the duet album, Together, with rising label mate Marvin Gaye. The album peaked at number 42 on the Billboard Top LPs chart and produced the double-sided hits "Once Upon a Time" and "What's the Matter With You Baby", both songs reaching the top 20 of the Billboard Hot 100.

"My Guy" was one of the first Motown songs to break on the other side of the Atlantic, eventually peaking at number 5 on the UK chart and making Wells an international star. Around this time, the Beatles stated that Wells was their favorite American singer, and soon she was given an invitation to open for the group during their tour of the United Kingdom, thus making her the first Motown star to perform in the UK. Wells was only one of three female singers to open for the Beatles, the others being Brenda Holloway and Jackie DeShannon. Danny Tyrell accompanied her in live shows in Detroit. Wells made friends with all four Beatles and later released a tribute album, Love Songs to the Beatles, in mid-decade.

Former Motown sales chief Barney Ales described Wells's landmark success in 1964:

In 1964, Mary Wells was our big, big artist, I don't think there's any audience with an age of 30 through 50 that doesn't know the words to My Guy.

— 1992

=== 1964–1990: Motown departure and later career ===
Despite reaching the pinnacle of her career, Wells complained of not receiving monetary royalties from Motown. On her 21st birthday on May 13, 1964, Motown held a birthday party for the singer. The following day, Wells called Gordy and asked him to come to her apartment where she told him that she wanted to leave Motown as her contract expired on her birthday. Gordy reportedly attempted to renegotiate with a new contract but the singer refused. Later, it was claimed Wells was motivated to leave Motown by her ex-husband Herman Griffin.

Wells was offered a record deal with 20th Century Fox Records for $20,000. However, Gordy tried to block Wells from recording, claiming that the artist still had a year left in her contract. Wells's lawyer, however, invoked a clause that allowed her to leave Motown in which it was brought up that the original Motown contract in which Wells signed herself at the age of 17, when she was still a minor, therefore making the contract invalid. Motown and Wells settled but under the condition that she could not receive any royalties from her past works with the label, including use of her likeness to promote herself, a decision the singer would later regret.

During this period, Wells suffered from tuberculosis for a second time, which forced her to be bedridden. After recovering, Wells recorded a self titled album for 20th Century that included the charted songs "Ain't It The Truth", "Use Your Head" and "Never, Never Leave Me", which achieved only moderate chart success. The album and the follow-up Beatles tribute album both failed to chart. Rumors have hinted Motown may have threatened to sue radio stations for playing Wells's post-Motown music during this time. After a stressful period in which Wells and the label battled over multiple issues after her records failed to chart successfully, the singer asked to be let go in 1965 and left with a small settlement.

In 1966 entered a new contract with Atco Records, a subsidiary of Atlantic Records, where she released the album, The Two Sides of Mary Wells. The single, "Dear Lover", became her final top ten R&B hit. When follow-up singles failed to chart, Wells signed to Jubilee Records where she released the album, Servin' Up Some Soul, which was co-produced by Wells and then-husband, Cecil Womack, formerly of the Valentinos and youngest brother of soul singer Bobby Womack. The album produced Wells's final charted single on the Hot 100 with "The Doctor". She briefly appeared in a cameo role in the 1967 film, Catalina Caper. Wells then recorded for Reprise Records in 1969, only reaching the lower positions of the R&B charts through 1974. In 1972, Wells scored a UK hit with a re-issue of "My Guy", which was released on the Tamla-Motown label and climbed to number 14. Though a re-issue, Wells promoted the single heavily and appeared on the British TV show Top of the Pops for the first time.

Wells occasionally toured during that time but wouldn't record again until signing with Epic Records in 1981 after Larkin Arnold viewed one of her concerts, leading to the release of the album, In and Out of Love, which produced the top 20 club hit, "Gigolo", in 1982. Following the release of the album, Easy Touch, on the CBS subsidiary 51 West, she left the label and after appearing on the Emmy Award-winning special, Motown 25: Yesterday, Today, Forever, singing "My Guy", Wells settled on touring the oldies circuit. On the April 21, 1984, edition of American Top 40, Casey Kasem reported that Wells was attempting to establish a hot dog chain. In 1990, Wells made her final recording for Ian Levine's Motorcity Records.

=== 1990–1992: Final years ===
Starting around 1989, Wells began experiencing vocal and throat issues during concerts. Following a series of performances on an oldies revue on a cruise in Toronto that year, Wells began complaining of not being able to breathe. She was rushed to a Los Angeles hospital where doctors diagnosed Wells with laryngeal cancer. As a result, Wells announced that she was stepping away from performing to undergo treatment.

Treatments for the disease ravaged her voice, forcing her to quit her music career. Since she had no health insurance, her illness wiped out her finances, forcing her to sell her home. As she struggled to continue treatment, old Motown friends, including Diana Ross, Mary Wilson, members of the Temptations and Martha Reeves, made donations to support her, along with the help of admirers such as Dionne Warwick, Rod Stewart, Bruce Springsteen, Aretha Franklin and Bonnie Raitt. That same year, a benefit concert was held by fellow Detroit native Anita Baker. Wells was also given a tribute by friends such as Stevie Wonder and Little Richard on The Joan Rivers Show.

In 1991, Wells brought a multimillion-dollar lawsuit against Motown for royalties she felt she had not received upon leaving Motown Records in 1964 and for loss of royalties for not promoting her songs as the company should have. Motown eventually settled the lawsuit by giving her a six-figure sum. That same year, she testified before the United States Congress to encourage government funding for cancer research:

I'm here today to urge you to keep the faith. I can't cheer you on with all my voice, but I can encourage, and I pray to motivate you with all my heart and soul and whispers.

== Personal life ==
During her teen years when she was being mentored by Johnnie Mae Matthews, Wells was reportedly romantically involved with Otis Williams. According to other published reports, after her affair with Williams ended, she had a relationship with Wilson Pickett.

Wells married twice: first, in 1961, to Detroit singer Herman Griffin; they divorced in 1963. Despite rumors, she never dated fellow Motown singer Marvin Gaye, who went on to have successful duet partnerships with other Motown singers (Kim Weston, Tammi Terrell and Diana Ross) after Wells left Motown. Throughout 1965, she became involved with R&B superstar Jackie Wilson and Chicago-based producer Carl Davis. At one point, Wells and Davis were engaged.

In 1966, Wells married singer-songwriter Cecil Womack, formerly of the Valentinos, and the younger brother of musician Bobby Womack. The marriage lasted until 1977 and produced three children: Cecil Jr., Harry, and Stacy. She had a fourth child, Sugar, with Curtis Womack (Cecil's brother).

== Death ==
In the summer of 1992, Wells's cancer returned and she was rushed to the Kenneth Norris Jr. Cancer Hospital in Los Angeles with pneumonia. With the effects of her unsuccessful treatments and a weakened immune system, Wells died on July 26, 1992, at the age of 49. After her funeral, which included a eulogy given by her old friend and former collaborator, Smokey Robinson, Wells was cremated, and her ashes were laid to rest in Glendale's Forest Lawn Memorial Park, in a Womack family crypt. Family friend Sam Cooke is buried in The Garden of Honor, about 850 feet (260 m) to the west.

== Legacy and accolades ==
Wells is often referred to as the "First Lady of Motown" as well as "the Queen of Motown" due to becoming the first female star artist to emerge from the label.

As a Motown artist, Wells was the first solo artist on the label to produce a top 40 crossover single, doing so with 1961's "I Don't Want to Take a Chance" and was also the first Motown artist to produce multiple top ten hits on the Billboard Hot 100 between 1962 and 1963.

When "My Guy" hit number one on the Billboard Hot 100 in the late spring of 1964, it was only the third Motown-associated single to reach the top after the Marvelettes' "Please, Mr. Postman" and Little Stevie Wonder's "Fingertips" and the first number one single on the Motown imprint, predating the Supremes' "Where Did Our Love Go".

During her 30-year career, Wells sent 23 songs to the Billboard Hot 100, including 12 top 40 singles, seven top 20 singles, four top ten singles and a number one hit. On the R&B charts, she had 21 songs, including 19 top 40 singles, 16 top 20 singles, 14 top ten singles, six top 5 singles and three number one singles.

Her 1968 composition and recording, "Two Lovers History" from her album Servin' Up Some Soul, was sampled by Yasiin Bey and Talib Kweli on the song "History" off the former's The Ecstatic in 2009.

In 1987, Wells was a finalist for induction into the Rock and Roll Hall of Fame but failed to get in.

Wells earned one Grammy Award nomination during her career. Her song "My Guy" was inducted into the Grammy Hall of Fame in 1999.

In 1989, Wells was honored with the Pioneer Award from the Rhythm and Blues Foundation during its inaugural year. A year later, the foundation raised more than $50,000 to help with her treatment after her illness had wiped out all of her finances.

Wells was inducted into the Michigan Rock and Roll Legends Hall of Fame in 2006. She was inducted into the National Rhythm & Blues Hall of Fame in 2017.

== Discography ==
=== Singles ===
- 1960: "Bye Bye Baby" (US No. 45)
- 1961: "I Don't Want to Take a Chance" (US No. 33)
- 1962: "The One Who Really Loves You" (US No. 8)
- 1962: "You Beat Me to the Punch" (US No. 9)
- 1962: "Two Lovers" (US No. 7)
- 1963: "Laughing Boy" (US No. 15)
- 1963: "Your Old Standby" (US No. 40)
- 1963: "You Lost the Sweetest Boy" (US No. 22)
- 1963: "What's So Easy for Two Is So Hard for One" (US No. 29)
- 1964: "My Guy" (US No. 1, UK No. 5)
- 1964: "Once Upon a Time" (US No. 19)
- 1964: "What's the Matter with You Baby" (US No. 15)
- 1964: "Ain't It the Truth" (US No. 45)
- 1964: "Stop Takin' Me for Granted" (US No. 88)
- 1965: "Use Your Head" (US No. 34)
- 1965: "Never, Never Leave Me" (US R&B No. 15)
- 1965: "He's a Lover" (US No. 74)
- 1965: "Me Without You" (US No. 95)
- 1966: "Dear Lover" (US No. 51, R&B No. 6)
- 1966: "Can't You See (You're Losing Me)" (US No. 94)
- 1966: "Such a Sweet Thing" (US No. 99)
- 1968: "The Doctor" (US No. 65, R&B No. 22)
- 1969: "Never Give a Man the World: (US R&B No. 38)
- 1969: "Dig the Way I Feel" (US R&B No. 35)
- 1981: "Gigolo" (US Club No. 13, R&B No. 69)

=== Charted albums ===
- 1963: Two Lovers and Other Great Hits (No. 49 U.S.)
- 1964: Together (No. 42 U.S.)
- 1964: Greatest Hits (No. 18 U.S.)
- 1964: Mary Wells Sings My Guy (No. 111 U.S.)
- 1965: Mary Wells (No. 145 U.S.)
