= Motown albums discography =

Albums released by American record label

This is a discography for albums released by the American rhythm and blues record label Motown as well as its subsidiaries and imprints.

Overview of Motown album releases
Album title	Artist(s)	Issue	Notes
Hi... We're The Miracles	The Miracles	TM-220	Tamla
The Soulful Moods of Marvin Gaye	Marvin Gaye	TM-221	Tamla
The Great Gospel Stars	The Gospel Stars	TM-222	Tamla. The first album released by any of Berry Gordy's labels.
Cookin' with The Miracles	The Miracles	TM-223	Tamla
Introducing the Downbeats	The Downbeats	TM-225	[Unissued]
Money and Other Big Hits	Barrett Strong	TM-226	[Unissued]
Please Mr. Postman	The Marvelettes	TM-228	Tamla
Bye Bye Baby I Don't Want to Take a Chance	Mary Wells	MLP-600	
Twistin' the World Around	The Twistin' Kings	MT-601	
The Satintones Sing	The Satintones	MT-602	[Unissued]
Motown Special	Various Artists	M-603	
Eddie Holland	Eddie Holland	MT-604	
The One Who Really Loves You	Mary Wells	MT-605	
Meet The Supremes	The Supremes	MT-606	
Tamla Special #1	Various Artists	TM-224	Tamla
Introducing the Downbeats	Downbeats	TM-225	Tamla [unissued]
Money and Other Big Hits	Barrett Strong	TM-226	Tamla [unissued]
They Shall Be Mine	Rev. Columbus Mann	TM-227	Tamla
The Marvelettes Smash Hits of 1962 [aka The Marveletts Sing]	The Marvelettes	TM-229	Tamla
I'll Try Something New	The Miracles	TM-230	Tamla
Playboy	The Marvelettes	TM-231	Tamla
Tribute to Uncle Ray	Little Stevie Wonder	TM-232	Tamla
The Jazz Soul of Little Stevie	Little Stevie Wonder	TM-233	Tamla
The Miracles Sing Modern	The Miracles	TM-234	Tamla [unissued]
Do You Love Me (Now That I Can Dance)	The Contours	G-901	Gordy
All Star Jazz	Earl Washington All Stars (Workshop Jazz)	WSJ-202	
Two Lovers and Other Great Hits	Mary Wells	MT-607	
The Return of the Blues Boss	Amos Milburn	MT-608	
Motor Town Revue, Volume 1	Various Artists	M-609	
The Supremes Sing Ballads and Blues	The Supremes	MT-610	[Unissued]
Recorded Live on Stage	Mary Wells	MT-611	
Second Time Around	Mary Wells	M-612	[Unissued]
A Package of 16 Big Hits	Various Artists	MT-614	
Christmas with The Miracles	The Miracles	TM-236	Tamla
The Marvelous Marvelettes	The Marvelettes	TM-237	Tamla
The Fabulous Miracles	The Miracles	TM-238	Tamla
That Stubborn Kinda Fellow	Marvin Gaye	TM-239	Tamla
Recorded Live: The 12 Year Old Genius	Little Stevie Wonder	TM-240	Tamla
The Miracles Recorded Live on Stage	The Miracles	TM-241	Tamla
Marvin Gaye Recorded Live on Stage	Marvin Gaye	TM-242	Tamla
The Marvelettes Recorded Live on Stage	The Marvelettes	TM-243	Tamla
The Miracles Doin' Mickey's Monkey	The Miracles	TM-245	Tamla
Workout Stevie Workout	Little Stevie Wonder	TM-248	[Unissued]
With a Song in My Heart	Stevie Wonder	TM-250	
Come and Get These Memories	Martha and the Vandellas	G-902	Gordy
Modern Innovations on C&W Themes	Ralph Sharon	G-903	Gordy
The Great March to Freedom	Rev. Martin Luther King	G-906	Gordy
Heat Wave	Martha and the Vandellas	GLP-907	Gordy
The Great March on Washington	Rev. Martin Luther King, Roy Wilkins, A. Philip Randolph, Whitney Young, Walter Reuther, Liz Lands	G-908	Gordy
Introducing Miss Paula Greer	Paula Greer (Workshop Jazz)	WSJ 203	
Detroit Jazz	Paula Greer & Johnny Griffith Trio (Workshop Jazz)	WSJ 204	
Jazz	Johnny Griffith Trio (Workshop Jazz)	WSJ 205	
Blue Vibrations	Dave Hamilton (Workshop Jazz)	WSJ 206	
Boss Bossa Nova	George Bohanon Quartet (Workshop Jazz)	WSJ 207	
Together	Marvin Gaye and Mary Wells	MT-613	
Motor Town Revue, Volume 2	Various Artists	MT-615	
Mary Wells' Greatest Hits	Mary Wells	MT-616	
Mary Wells Sings My Guy	Mary Wells	MT-617	
Better Late Than Never	Bobby Breen	MT-618	[Unissued]
My Son the Sit-In	Stepin Fetchit	MT-619	[Unissued]
Where Did Our Love Go	The Supremes	MS-621	
Four Tops	Four Tops	MS-622	
A Bit of Liverpool	The Supremes	MS-623	
16 Original Big Hits, Volume 3	Various Artists	MT-624	
Meet the Temptations	The Temptations	GS-911	Gordy
I Like It Like That	The Miracles	T-249	
When I'm Alone I Cry	Marvin Gaye	TM-251	Tamla
Marvin Gaye's Greatest Hits	Marvin Gaye	TM-252	
Stevie at the Beach	Stevie Wonder	TM-255	
A Collection of 16 Big Hits, Volume 2	Various Artists	TM-256	
Every Little Bit Hurts	Brenda Holloway	TM-257	
Hello Broadway	Marvin Gaye	TS-259	Tamla
The Right Side of Lefty Edwards	Lefty Edwards (Workshop Jazz)	WSJ 212	
Reflections	Earl Washington (Workshop Jazz)	WSJ 213	
Bold Bohannon	George Bohannon Quartet (Workshop Jazz)	WSJ 214	
The Soul and Sound of Herbie Williams	Herbie Williams (Workshop Jazz)	WSJ 216	[Unissued?]
Breaking Through	Four Tops (Workshop Jazz)	WSJ 217	[Unissued?]
Compositions of Charlie Mingus	Pepper Adams (Workshop Jazz)	WSJ 219	
Beat	Roy Brooks (Workshop Jazz)	WSJ 220	
Just Like Romeo and Juliet	Reflections	GW LPM-300	Golden World
Hits of the Sixties	Choker Campbell And Orchestra	MS-620	
Second Album	Four Tops	MS-622	
The Supremes Sing Country and Western And Pop	The Supremes	MS-625	
The Supremes Recorded Live! Live! Live!	The Supremes	MT-626	[Unissued]
More Hits by The Supremes	The Supremes	M 627	
There's a Place for Us	The Supremes	MT-628	[Unissued]
We Remember Sam Cooke	The Supremes	MS-629	
Nothing But a Man (Soundtrack)	Various Artists	MT-630	
That Motown Sound	Earl Van Dyke And The Soul Brothers	MS-631	
The Prime of My Life	Billy Eckstine	MS-632	
Collection of 16 Big Hits Volume 4	Various Artists	MT-633	
Four Tops Second Album	Four Tops	MS-634	
Tribute to the Girls	The Supremes	MT-635	[Unissued]
The Supremes at the Copa	The Supremes	M 636	
Merry Christmas	The Supremes	MS-638	
I Hear a Symphony	The Supremes	MS 643	
The Temptations Sing Smokey	The Temptations	G 912	Gordy
scope="row"| The Temptin' Temptations	The Temptations	GS 914	Gordy
Dance Party	Martha and the Vandellas	G915	Gordy
The Miracles' Greatest Hits from the Beginning	The Miracles	TS2-254	
How Sweet It Is to Be Loved by You	Marvin Gaye	TS-258	Tamla
Side by Side	Marvin Gaye & Kim Weston	TS-260	[Unissued]
A Tribute to the Great Nat King Cole	Marvin Gaye	TS-261	Tamla
Hurtin' and Cryin'	Brenda Holloway	TS-263	[Unissued]
Motortown Revue in Paris	Various Artists	TM-264	
Hello Dummy	Willie Tyler And Lester	TM-265	
Going to a Go-Go	The Miracles	TS 267	
Up-Tight	Stevie Wonder	TS-268	
Shotgun	Jr. Walker & All Stars	SS-701	Soul
Folk Song Stylist	Abner Jay	WG-5000	Wingate
The Original Spinners	The Spinners	MT-639	
Live at Lake Tahoe	Billy Eckstine	MT-640	[Unissued]
I Hear a Symphony	The Supremes	MS-643	
Here I Am	Barbara McNair	MS-644	
Live at the Americana	Tony Martin	MS-645	
My Way	Billy Eckstine	MS-646	
On Top	Four Tops	MS-647	
Pure Gold	The Supremes	MS-648	[Unissued]
The Supremes A' Go-Go	The Supremes	MS-649	
Greatest Hits	Martha and the Vandellas	GS 917	Gordy
Gettin' Ready	The Temptations	GS 918	Gordy
Greatest Hits	The Temptations	GS 919	Gordy
Watchout!	Martha and the Vandellas	GS 920	Gordy
The Marvelettes Greatest Hits	The Marvelettes	TS-253	Tamla
Moods of Marvin Gaye	Marvin Gaye	TS-266	Tamla
Up-Tight Everything's Alright	Stevie Wonder	TS-268	
This Old Heart of Mine (Is Weak for You)	Isley Brothers	TS-269	
Take Two	Marvin Gaye and Kim Weston	TS-270	Tamla
Away We a Go-Go	The Miracles	TS-271	Tamla
Down to Earth	Stevie Wonder	TS-272	
Marvin Gaye at the Copa	Marvin Gaye	TS-273	[Unissued]
Brenda Holloway	Brenda Holloway	TS-273	[Unissued]
Soul Session	Jr. Walker & All Stars	SS-702	Soul
Road Runner	Jr. Walker & All Stars	SS-703	Soul
Darling Baby	Elgins (V.I.P.)	VIPS-400	
The Velvelettes	Velvelettes (V.I.P.)	VIPS-401	[Unissued]
We're Off to Dublin in the Green	Abbey Tavern Singers (V.I.P.)	VIPS-402	
He Satisfies Me	Rev. Columbus Mann (Wingate	WG-701	
Hungry for Love	San Remo Golden Strings	SLP-901	Ric-Tic
The Supremes Sing Holland–Dozier–Holland	The Supremes	MS 650	
Collection of 16 Big Hits Volume 6	Various Artists	MS-655	
The Supremes and the Motown Sound from Broadway to Hollywood	The Supremes	MS-656	[Unissued]
Four Tops on Broadway	Four Tops	MS-657	
Supremes Sing Rodgers and Hart	The Supremes	MS-659	
Reach Out	Four Tops	MS 660	
Collection of 16 Big Hits, Volume 7	Various Artists	MS-661	
Four Tops Greatest Hits	Four Tops	MS-662	
Greatest Hits	The Supremes	MS 2-663	
Soul Sounds	Chris Clark	MS-664	
A Collection of 16 Big Hits, Volume 8	Various Artists	MS-666	
Motown Chartbusters Volume 1		MS-707	
Temptations Live!	The Temptations	GS 921	Gordy
The Temptations with a Lot o' Soul	The Temptations	GS 922	Gordy
Hungry for Love	San Remo Golden Strings	GS 923	Gordy
The Temptations in a Mellow Mood	The Temptations	GS 924	Gordy
Martha and the Vandellas Live!	Martha and the Vandellas	GS 925	Gordy
The Marvelettes (Pink Album)	The Marvelettes	TS 274	Tamla
Soul on the Rocks	Isley Brothers	TS-275	Tamla
Make It Happen	The Miracles	TS-276	Tamla
United	Marvin Gaye and Tammi Terrell	TS-277	Tamla
Greatest Hits, Volume 2	Marvin Gaye	TS-278	Tamla
I Was Made to Love Her	Stevie Wonder	TS-279	Tamla
Jimmy Ruffin Sings Top Ten	Jimmy Ruffin	SS-704	Soul
Jr. Walker and the All Stars Live	Jr. Walker & All Stars	SS-705	Soul
Everybody Needs Love	Gladys Knight & the Pips	SS-706	
In Loving Memory	Various artists	MT 642	
Reflections	Diana Ross & the Supremes	MS 665	
Chuck Jackson Arrives!	Chuck Jackson	MS-667	
Collection of 16 Big Hits, Volume 9	Various Artists	MS-668	
Yesterday's Dreams	Four Tops	MS-669	
Love Child	Diana Ross & the Supremes	MS 670	
Diana Ross and the Supremes Sing and Perform "Funny Girl"	Diana Ross & the Supremes	MS-672	
Live at London's Talk of the Town	Diana Ross & the Supremes	MS-676	
For The Love Of Ivy	Billy Eckstine	MS-677	
Diana Ross & the Supremes Join The Temptations	Diana Ross & the Supremes and The Temptations	MS 679	
Merry Christmas from Motown	Various Artists	MS-681	
TCB	Diana Ross & the Supremes and The Temptations	MS 682	
Someday at Christmas	Stevie Wonder	TS-281	
Stevie Wonder's Greatest Hits	Stevie Wonder	TS-282	
Young, Gifted and Black	Bob And Marcia	TS-283	[Unissued]
You're All I Need	Marvin Gaye and Tammi Terrell	TS-284	Tamla
I Heard It Through the Grapevine	Marvin Gaye	TS-285	Tamla
Sophisticated Soul	The Marvelettes	TS 286	Tamla
Special Occasion	The Miracles	TS-290	Tamla
For Once in My Life	Stevie Wonder	TS-291	
Ridin' High	Martha Reeves and the Vandellas	G 926	Gordy
The Temptations Wish It Would Rain	The Temptations	GS 927	Gordy
Swing	San Remo Golden Strings	GS-928	
...Free at Last	Dr. Martin Luther King Jr.	GS-929	
Bobby Taylor & the Vancouvers	Bobby Taylor & the Vancouvers	GS-930	
Soul Master	Edwin Starr	GS-931	
Alfie	Eivets Rednow	GS-932	
Live at the Copa	The Temptations	GS 938	Gordy
Motown Chartbusters Volume 2		STML11082	
Fellin' Bluesy	Gladys Knight & the Pips	SS-707	Soul
Here Comes the Judge	Shorty Long	SS-709	Soul
Silk N' Soul	Gladys Knight & the Pips	SS-711	Soul
The Four Tops Now!	Four Tops	MS-675	
The Real Barbara McNair	Barbara McNair	MS-680	
Along Came Jonah	Jonah Jones	MS-683	
Collection of Original 16 Big Hits, Volume 10		MS-684	
My Whole World Ended	David Ruffin	MS-685	
A Bag of Soup	Soupy Sales	MS-686	
Goin' Back to Chuck Jackson	Chuck Jackson	MS-687	
Motortown Revue Live		MS-688	
Let the Sunshine In	Diana Ross & the Supremes	MS-689	
Red Jones Steeerikes Back	Red Jones	MS-691	
Together	Diana Ross & the Supremes and The Temptations	MS-692	
Collection of Original 16 Big Hits, Volume 11		MS-693	
Cream of the Crop	Diana Ross & the Supremes	MS-694	
Soul Spin	Four Tops	MS-695	
Feelin' Good	David Ruffin	MS-696	
The Mynah Birds	Mynah Birds	MS-697	
Moving On	Joe Harnell	MS-698	
G.I.T. on Broadway	Diana Ross & the Supremes and The Temptations	MS-699	
Diana Ross Presents The Jackson 5	The Jackson 5	MS-700	
Greatest Hits, Vol. 3	Diana Ross & the Supremes	MS-702	
Motown Chartbusters Volume 3		MS-732	
The Temptations Show	The Temptations	GS-933	Gordy
		GS-934	Gordy [Unissued]
Motown Winner's Circle: #1 Hits, Vol. 1		GS-935	Gordy
Motown Winner's Circle: #1 Hits, Vol. 2		GS-936	Gordy
		GS-937	Gordy [Unissued]
Cloud Nine	The Temptations	GS-939	Gordy
25 Miles	Edwin Starr	GS-940	Gordy
		GS-941	Gordy [Unissued]
Taylor Made Soul	Bobby Taylor	GS-942	Gordy
Motown Winner's Circle: #1 Hits, Vol. 3	Gordy	GS-943	
Sugar 'n' Spice	Martha Reeves and the Vandellas	GS-944	Gordy
Just We Two	Edwin Starr & Blinky	GS-945	Gordy
Motown Winner's Circle: #1 Hits, Vol. 4		GS-946	Gordy
Puzzle People	The Temptations	GS-949	Gordy
Doin' Their Thing	Isley Brothers	TS-287	Tamla
In Full Bloom	The Marvelettes	TS-288	Tamla
Smokey Robinson & The Miracles LIVE!	The Miracles	TS-289	Tamla
M.P.G.	Marvin Gaye	TS-292	Tamla
Marvin Gaye and His Girls	Marvin Gaye	TS-293	Tamla
Easy	Marvin Gaye and Tammi Terrell	TS-294	Tamla
Time Out for The Miracles	The Miracles	TS-295	Tamla
My Cherie Amour	Stevie Wonder	TS-296	Tamla
Four in Blue	The Miracles	TS-297	Tamla
Ruff 'N Ready	Jimmy Ruffin	SS-708	Soul
Home Cookin'	Jr. Walker & All Stars	SS-710	Soul
Silk N' Soul	Gladys Knight & the Pips	SS-711	Soul
Nitty Gritty	Gladys Knight & the Pips	SS-713	Soul
Green Grow the Lilacs [aka Baby I'm for Real]	Originals	SS-716	Soul
Best of the Fantastic Four	Fantastic Four	SS-717	Soul
Jr. Walker and the All Stars' Greatest Hits	Jr. Walker & All Stars	SS-718	Soul
The Prime of Shorty Long	Shorty Long	SS-719	Soul
Switched on Blues	Various Artists	SS-720	Soul
Gotta Hold on to This Feeling [aka What Does It take to Win Your Love]	Jr. Walker & All Stars	SS-721	Soul
Blues Helping	Love Sculpture	RS-505	Rare Earth
S. F. Sorrow	Pretty Things	RS-506	Rare Earth
Get Ready	Rare Earth	RS-507	Rare Earth
Bedlam	Rustix	RS-508	Rare Earth
The Messengers	The Messengers	RS-509	Rare Earth
CC Rides Again	Chris Clark	WS-801	Weed
Right On	The Supremes	MS-705	
Diana Ross	Diana Ross		
ABC	The Jackson 5		
Farewell	Diana Ross & the Supremes	MS2-708	
The Return of The Marvelettes	The Marvelettes		Tamla
Greatest Hits, Vol. 2	The Temptations		Gordy
The Jackson 5 Christmas Album	The Jackson 5		
Live at London's Talk of the Town	The Temptations		Gordy
Psychedelic Shack	The Temptations		Gordy
A Pocket Full of Miracles	The Miracles		
Still Waters Run Deep	Four Tops		
The Temptations Christmas Card	The Temptations		Gordy
That's the Way Love Is	Marvin Gaye		Tamla
Third Album	The Jackson 5		
What Love Has...Joined Together	The Miracles		
New Ways but Love Stays	The Supremes		
The Magnificent 7	The Supremes & Four Tops		
Natural Resources	Martha Reeves and the Vandellas		Gordy
Live at the Talk of the Town	Stevie Wonder		
Stevie Wonder Live	Stevie Wonder		
Signed, Sealed & Delivered	Stevie Wonder		
Motown Chartbusters Volume 4			
Generation (Soundtrack)	Rare Earth	RS-510	[Unissued]
Toe Fat	Toe Fat	RS-511	Rare Earth
Love at First Sight	Sounds Nice	RS-512	Rare Earth
Come on People	Rustix	RS-513	Rare Earth
Ecology	Rare Earth	RS-514	Rare Earth
Parachute	The Pretty Things	RS-515	Rare Earth
The Gospel According to Zeus	Power of Zeus	RS-516	Rare Earth
Easy Ridin'	Easybeats	RS-517	Rare Earth [unissued]
Paradise Lost	Lost Nation	RS-518	Rare Earth
Ain't Nothin' in Our Pocket But Love	Poor Boys	RS-519	Rare Earth
45 Lives	Cats	RS-521	Rare Earth
I Think Therefore I Am	R. Dean Taylor	RS-522	Rare Earth
Everything Is Everything	Diana Ross		
Goin' Back to Indiana	The Jackson 5		
Surrender	Diana Ross		
The Undisputed Truth	The Undisputed Truth		Gordy
Got to Be There	Michael Jackson		
Touch	The Supremes		
The Return of the Magnificent Seven	The Supremes & Four Tops		
Greatest Hits	The Jackson 5		
One Dozen Roses- The Miracles			
Maybe Tomorrow	The Jackson 5		
Sky's the Limit	The Temptations		Gordy
What's Going On	Marvin Gaye		Tamla
Where I'm Coming From	Stevie Wonder		
Motown Chartbusters Volume 5			
Motown Chartbusters Volume 6			
What the World Needs Now Is Love	Tom Clay	MW-103L	MoWest
One World	Rare Earth	RS-520	Rare Earth
Brass Monkey	Brass Monkey	RS-523	Rare Earth
U.F.O. 1	U.F.O.	RS-524	Rare Earth
Toe Fat Two	Toe Fat	RS-525	Rare Earth
Sunday Funnies	Sunday Funnies	RS-526	Rare Earth
Magic	Magic	RS-527	Rare Earth
Stoney and Meatloaf	Stoney & Meatloaf	R-528L	Rare Earth
Down at the Brassworks	Impact Of Brass	R-529L	Rare Earth
Dennis Stoner	Dennis Stoner	R-530L	Rare Earth
Jesus Christ's Greatest Hits	God Squad Featuring Leonard Caston	R-531L	Rare Earth
Already a Household Word	Repairs	R-532L	Rare Earth
Head to Head	Other People	R-533L	Rare Earth
Rare Earth in Concert	Rare Earth	R-534L	Rare Earth
All Directions	The Temptations		Gordy
Face to Face with the Truth	The Undisputed Truth		
Lookin' Through the Windows	The Jackson 5		
Solid Rock	The Temptations		Gordy
Floy Joy	The Supremes		
Jermaine	Jermaine Jackson		
Flying High Together	The Miracles		
Ben	Michael Jackson		
Black Magic	Martha Reeves and the Vandellas		Gordy
Talking Book	Stevie Wonder		
Trouble Man	Marvin Gaye		Tamla
Lady Sings the Blues	Diana Ross		
Music of My Mind	Stevie Wonder		
1957–1972	The Miracles		Tamla
Pippin	Original Broadway Cast	M-760L	Jobete Music Co./Belwin-Mills Publishing Corp
The Supremes Produced and Arranged by Jimmy Webb	The Supremes		
Motown Chartbusters Volume 7			
Happiness	Lodi	MW-101L	MoWest
Thelma Houston	Thelma Houston	MW-102L	MoWest
Chameleon	Frankie Valli & Four Seasons	MW-108L	MoWest
Syreeta	Syreeta	MW-113	MoWest
Odyssey	Odyssey	MW-115	MoWest
Someplace Else Now	Lesley Gore	MW-117	MoWest
Hollywood	Crusaders	MW-118L	MoWest
Celebration	Celebration	MW-119	MoWest
Repairs	Repairs	MW-121	MoWest
Two Friends	Two Friends	NR-101	Natural Resources
Heart	Heart	NR-102	Natural Resources
Corliss	Corliss	NR-103	Natural Resources
Pass the Butter	Gotham	NR-104	Natural Resources
Road	Road	NR-105	Natural Resources
Plight of the Redman	XIT	R-536L	Rare Earth
Howl the Good	Howl the Good	R-537L	Rare Earth
Benediction	Sunday Funnies	R-538L	Rare Earth
One Tree or Another	Keef James	R-539L	Rare Earth
The Crystal Mansion	Crystal Mansion	R-540L	Rare Earth
Wolfe	Wolfe	R-541L	Rare Earth
Matrix	Matrix	R-542L	Rare Earth
Willie Remembers	Rare Earth	R-543L	Rare Earth
1990	The Temptations		Gordy
Diana & Marvin	Diana Ross and Marvin Gaye		
G.I.T.: Get It Together	The Jackson 5		
Touch Me in the Morning	Diana Ross		
Innervisions	Stevie Wonder		
Music & Me	Michael Jackson		
Renaissance	The Miracles		
The Jackson 5 in Japan	The Jackson 5		
Let's Get It On	Marvin Gaye		Tamla
Masterpiece	The Temptations		Gordy
Skywriter	The Jackson 5		
The Supremes Live! In Japan	The Supremes		
The Temptations in Japan	The Temptations		
Jackie Jackson	Jackie Jackson		
Last Time I Saw Him	Diana Ross		
Motown Chartbusters Volume 8			
Silent Warrior	Xit	R-545L	Rare Earth
Ma	Rare Earth	R-546L	Rare Earth
Law of the Land	The Undisputed Truth		
Dancing Machine	The Jackson 5		
Machine Gun	The Commodores		
Marvin Gaye Live!	Marvin Gaye		Tamla
Fulfillingness' First Finale	Stevie Wonder		
Motown Chartbusters Volume 9			
Rare Earth Live in Chicago	Rare Earth	R-547	Rare Earth
Down to Earth	The Undisputed Truth		
The Marvelettes Anthology	The Marvelettes		Tamla
Best of The Marvelettes	The Marvelettes		Tamla
Caught in the Act	The Commodores	M6-820S1	Motown
Forever, Michael	Michael Jackson		
House Party	The Temptations		Gordy
Moving Violation	The Jackson 5		
A Quiet Storm	Smokey Robinson		
A Song for You	The Temptations		Gordy
The Supremes	The Supremes		
City of Angels	The Miracles		
Back to Earth	Rare Earth	R6-548S1	Rare Earth
Cosmic Truth	The Undisputed Truth		
Higher Than High	The Undisputed Truth		
Motown Gold	Various		
Diana Ross	Diana Ross		
High Energy	The Supremes		
I Want You	Marvin Gaye		Tamla
Mary, Scherrie & Susaye	The Supremes		
Songs in the Key of Life	Stevie Wonder		
The Temptations Do the Temptations	The Temptations		Gordy
Wings of Love	The Temptations		Gordy
Real Pretty	The Pretty Things	R7-549R2	Rare Earth
Midnight Lady	Rare Earth	R6-550S1	Rare Earth
Live at the London Palladium	Marvin Gaye		Tamla
Commodores	The Commodores		
Commodores Live!	The Commodores		
Baby It's Me	Diana Ross		
Looking Back - Anthology	Stevie Wonder		
Mandré	Mandré	M6-886	Motown
Big Time	Smokey Robinson	T6-355	Tamla
Motown Gold Vol. 2	Various		
Come Get It!	Rick James		Gordy
Here, My Dear	Marvin Gaye		Tamla
Ross	Diana Ross		
Bustin' Out of L Seven	Rick James		Gordy
The Boss	Diana Ross		
Journey through the Secret Life of Plants	Stevie Wonder		
Partners	Scherrie & Susaye		
Mary Wilson	Mary Wilson		
Motown Chartbusters Volume 10			
Apollo	Apollo	G7-985	Gordy
Garden of Love	Rick James		Gordy
Hotter than July	Stevie Wonder	T8-373	Tamla
Warm Thoughts	Smokey Robinson		Tamla
diana	Diana Ross		
Let's Get Serious	Jermaine Jackson		
Lady T	Teena Marie		
Irons in the Fire	Teena Marie		Gordy
Black Russian	Black Russian	M7-942R1	
Motown Chartbusters Volume 11			
In Our Lifetime	Marvin Gaye		Tamla
One Day in Your Life	Michael Jackson		
Street Songs	Rick James	G8-1001M1	Gordy
Set My Love in Motion	Syreeta	T8-376	Tamla
It Must Be Magic	Teena Marie	G8-1002M1	Gordy
The DeBarges	DeBarge		Gordy
Jose Feliciano	Jose Feliciano		Gordy
Tell Me a Lie	Bettye Lavette	6000ML	Motown
Yes It's You Lady	Smokey Robinson	6001TL	Tamla
Stevie Wonder's Original Musiquarium I	Stevie Wonder	6002TL2	Tamla
Ambiance	Nolen & Crossley	6003GL	Gordy
Keep It Live	Dazz Band	6004ML	Motown
Throwin' Down	Rick James	6005GL	Gordy
So Right	High Inergy	6006GL	Gordy
Lionel Richie	Lionel Richie	6007ML	Motown
Reunion	The Temptations	6008GL	Gordy
I've Never Been to Me	Charlene	6009ML	Motown
Trust Me	Jean Carn	6010ML	Motown
Li'l Suzy	Ozone	6011ML	Motown
All This Love	DeBarge	6012GL	Gordy
Strung Out on Motown	Regal Funkharmonic Orchestra	6014ML	Motown
Let Me Tickle Your Fancy	Jermaine Jackson	6017ML	Motown
Escenas De Amor	Jose Feliciano	6018LL	
Love Changes	O.C. Smith	6019ML	Motown
Pressin' On	Billy Preston	6020ML	Motown
Amor Secreto	Pedro Montero	6021LL	
Second to Nunn	Bobby Nunn	6022ML	Motown
Blow	Bobby Militello	6023GL	Gordy
Watch It Sucker!	Lawanda Page	6025ML	Motown
Himself (Soundtrack)	Bill Cosby	6026ML	Motown
Used to Be	Charlene	6027ML	Motown
All the Great Hits	Commodores	6028ML	Motown
Motown Chartbusters Volume 12		STML-12164	
Cold Blooded	Rick James	6043GL	Gordy
Romance in the Night	Jose Feliciano	6035ML	Gordy
In a Special Way	DeBarge		Gordy
Can't Slow Down	Lionel Richie	6059ML	Motown
Farewell My Summer Love	Michael Jackson	6101ML	Motown
Reflections	Rick James		Gordy
Somebody's Watching Me	Rockwell	6052ML	Motown
Tiggi Clay	Tiggi Clay	6067CL	Morocco
The Big Chill: More Songs from the Original Soundtrack	Various artists	6094ML	Motown
Truly for You	The Temptations		Gordy
Ain't No Turnin' Back	Phyllis St. James		Motown
The Woman in Red	Stevie Wonder	6108ML	Motown
Thomas McClary	Thomas McClary	6121ML	Motown
Glow	Rick James	6149GL	Gordy
In Square Circle	Stevie Wonder		
Only For You	Mary Jane Girls		
Rhythm of the Night	DeBarge		Gordy
Anthology	Michael Jackson		
That Look	Alfie	6146ML	Motown
Dancing on the Ceiling	Lionel Richie	6158ML	Motown
The Genie	Rockwell	6178ML	Motown
A Fine Mess	Various artists	6180ML	Motown
The Flag	Rick James		Gordy
To Be Continued...	The Temptations	6207GL	Gordy
Take Me All The Way	Stacy Lattisaw	6212ML	Motown
El DeBarge	El DeBarge		Gordy
The Return of Bruno	Bruce Willis		
One Heartbeat	Smokey Robinson		
Characters	Stevie Wonder		
Messages from The Boys	The Boys		
Today	Today		
Workin' Overtime	Diana Ross		
Love Is Like An Itchin' In My Heart	The Good Girls		
The Boys	The Boys		
Open Invitation	Gerald Alston		
Johnny Gill	Johnny Gill		
The Force Behind the Power	Diana Ross		
Coolin' at the Playground Ya Know!	Another Bad Creation		
Cooleyhighharmony	Boyz II Men		
Jungle Fever (soundtrack)	Stevie Wonder		
Back to Front	Lionel Richie		
Lovers Lane	M.C. Brains		
Christmas Interpretations	Boyz II Men		
Provocative	Johnny Gill		
II	Boyz II Men		
For Lovers Only	The Temptations		
The Remix Collection	Boyz II Men		
Take Me Higher	Diana Ross		
Natural Wonder	Stevie Wonder		
Conversation Peace	Stevie Wonder		
Let's Get the Mood Right	Johnny Gill		
Evolution	Boyz II Men		
Bethlehem	Brian McKnight		
Phoenix Rising	The Temptations		
The Ultimate Collection	Martha and the Vandellas		
Back at One	Brian McKnight		
The Game	Chico DeBarge		
Every Day Is a New Day	Diana Ross		
Ear-Resistible	The Temptations		
Mama's Gun	Erykah Badu		
The Supremes	The Supremes		
Acoustic Soul	India.Arie		
Dirty South	Rasheeda		
Halfway Tree	Damian Marley		
Tamla Motown Gold: The Sound of Young America	Various Artists		
The 70s Anthology	The Supremes		
Voyage to India	India.Arie		
20th Century Masters: The Millennium Collection: The Best of Boyz II Men	Boyz II Men		
Worldwide Underground	Erykah Badu		
Motown 1's	Various artists		
Gemini	Brian McKnight		
Marvin Gaye at the Copa	Marvin Gaye		
The People vs.	Trick-Trick		
A Time to Love	Stevie Wonder		
Gold: Martha and the Vandellas	Martha and the Vandellas		
Testimony: Vol. 1, Life & Relationship	India.Arie		
Motown 50	Various		
Motown: The Complete #1s	Various artists		10-disc CD box set, re-released in 2019 with an additional six-song bonus disc

== Sources cited ==
- Dahl, Bill (February 28, 2011). Motown: The Golden Years: More Than 100 Rare Photographs. Penguin Publishing Group. ISBN 9781440225574.
- Betts, Graham (June 2, 2014). Motown Encyclopedia. AC Publishing. ISBN 9781311441546.
- Waller, Don (1985). The Motown Story. New York City, New York, United States: Charles Scribner's Sons. ISBN 0684183471. LCCN 85002110.
