= Motown Chartbusters =

UK compilation album series

Tamla Motown logo

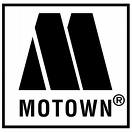
Motown logo

Motown Chartbusters is a series of compilation albums first released by EMI under licence on the Tamla Motown label in Britain. In total, 12 editions were released in the UK between 1967 and 1982. Volumes 1 and 2 were originally called British Motown Chartbusters; after this the title Motown Chartbusters was used.

== Background ==
Early Motown Records releases in Britain were not on the Motown label, but were issued on the London, Fontana, Oriole and Stateside labels. In 1964, Motown's first number 1 in Britain was "Baby Love" by the Supremes, released on EMI's Stateside label. "Where Did Our Love Go" by the Supremes, and "My Guy" by Mary Wells were amongst other big hits in the same year, also on Stateside. The first release on the Tamla Motown label was "Stop In The Name Of Love" by the Supremes, in March 1965.

By 1964, Motown had accumulated enough British hits for EMI to release a greatest hits album, A Collection of Tamla Motown Big Hits. Over the next few years, several more compilations were released, including six in the series 16 Original Big Hits. In 1967, the label issued the first of the Motown Chartbusters series. Although the series comprised mainly hit singles by various Motown artists, the albums also included other recordings that had not been hits in Britain and many significant single hits were excluded from the series. Later albums in the series failed to include any of the top ten singles achieved by Stevie Wonder, or any of his releases. Minor hits were sometimes included in place of bigger hits, most notably for the Jackson 5 and Michael Jackson. Because of Motown's policy of re-issuing tracks on single on a regular basis, there are some anomalies in the inclusion of tracks. Jimmy Ruffin's 'What Becomes of the Broken Hearted?' is included in both Volume 1 and Volume 9, as it was a UK hit single twice. Mary Wells' hit 'My Guy' features on Volume 7, released in 1972, after it had been a substantive reissue hit, despite being first released in 1964 and similarly 'Baby Love' is included on Volume 9, as it had been re-issued in 1974, ten years after it first charted in the UK for The Supremes.

The original albums were made by EMI under licence from Motown. EMI also made 8-track cartridge recordings of the early releases. In total, 12 editions were released in the UK, spanning 15 years from 1967 to 1982.

The first nine albums were Top 15 UK Albums Chart entries, whereas the later albums from 10 to 12 did not chart. The second volume of British Motown Chartbusters rose to No. 8 in January 1970. In the same year, Volume 3 spent six weeks at the No. 2 position, eventually reaching No. 1. Volumes 4 and 5 also hit No. 1. In 1971 Volume 6 went to No. 2 and, in 1972 and 1973, both Volumes 7 and 8 went to No. 9.

The series was the most successful set of compilation albums in terms of sales until the release of the Now That's What I Call Music series began in the mid-1980s. A compilation album, Now That's What I Call Motown, was released on the Universal Motown label.

The series was re-issued by the budget label Spectrum, starting in 1997. The clear differences between the two releases are the logos on the disc and cover: the original release has the Tamla Motown logo; the re-release has the Motown logo.

After its success in the UK, Motown went on to release variants of the compilation format in other counties such as the United States and Australia. There were also various releases on the same type of platform, such as Motown Chartbusters, 150 Hits of Gold and boxed sets.

== British Motown Chartbusters ==
=== Motown Chartbusters Volume 1 ===
British Motown Chartbusters

Compilation album by Various Artists
- Released: 1967 Album No TML/STML11055 Stereo issued 1969
- Genre: R&B, Soul
- Length: 44:47
- Label: Tamla Motown, Spectrum

First released in October 1967 as British Motown Chartbusters. It was re-released on the Spectrum label, and renamed Motown Chartbusters Volume 1

Track Listing

1. "Blowin' in the Wind" – Stevie Wonder
2. "You Keep Me Hangin' On" – The Supremes
3. "Standing in the Shadows of Love" – The Four Tops
4. "It Takes Two" – Marvin Gaye & Kim Weston
5. "When You're Young and in Love" – The Marvelettes
6. "(I Know) I'm Losing You" – The Temptations
7. "What Becomes of the Brokenhearted" – Jimmy Ruffin
8. "The Happening" – The Supremes
9. "7-Rooms of Gloom" – The Four Tops
10. "How Sweet It Is (To Be Loved by You)" – Jr. Walker & the All Stars
11. "I'm Ready for Love" – Martha & the Vandellas
12. "Love Is Here and Now You're Gone" – The Supremes
13. "Gonna Give Her All the Love I've Got" – Jimmy Ruffin
14. "I Was Made to Love Her" – Stevie Wonder
15. "Take Me in Your Arms and Love Me" – Gladys Knight & the Pips
16. "Jimmy Mack" – Martha & the Vandellas

==== Charts ====
Chart (1967)	Peak position
UK Albums (OCC)	2
Chart (1986)	Peak position
UK Albums (OCC)	25

==== Certifications ====
===== Telstar release =====
Region	Certification	Certified units/sales
United Kingdom (BPI) sales since 1986	Gold	100,000^{^}
^{^} Shipments figures based on certification alone.

===== Universal Music release =====
Region	Certification	Certified units/sales
United Kingdom (BPI) sales since 1997	Gold	100,000^{^}
^{^} Shipments figures based on certification alone.

=== Motown Chartbusters Volume 2 ===
British Motown Chartbusters Volume 2

Compilation album by Various Artists
- Released: 1968 Album No TML/STML11082
- Genre: R&B, Soul
- Length: 44:59
- Label: Tamla Motown, Spectrum

First released in November 1968 as British Motown Chartbusters Volume 2. It was re-released on the Spectrum label, and renamed Motown Chartbusters Volume 2

Track Listing

1. "Ain't Nothing Like the Real Thing" – Marvin Gaye & Tammi Terrell
2. "Reflections" – Diana Ross & the Supremes
3. "If You Can Want" – Smokey Robinson & the Miracles
4. "You Keep Running Away" – The Four Tops
5. "I Could Never Love Another (After Loving You)" – The Temptations
6. "I Heard It Through the Grapevine" – Gladys Knight & the Pips
7. "I'm Wondering" – Stevie Wonder
8. "I've Passed This Way Before" – Jimmy Ruffin
9. "Some Things You Never Get Used To" – Diana Ross & the Supremes
10. "Gotta See Jane" – R. Dean Taylor
11. "Shoo-Be-Doo-Be-Doo-Da-Day" – Stevie Wonder
12. "You're My Everything" – The Temptations
13. "Honey Chile" – Martha Reeves & the Vandellas
14. "If I Were a Carpenter" – The Four Tops
15. "I Second That Emotion" – Smokey Robinson & the Miracles
16. "If I Could Build My Whole World Around You" – Marvin Gaye & Tammi Terrell

==== Charts ====
Chart (1968)	Peak position
UK Albums (OCC)	8

=== Motown Chartbusters Volume 3 ===
Motown Chartbusters Volume 3

Compilation album by Various Artists
- Released: 1969 Album No TML/STML11121
- Genre: R&B, Soul
- Length: 45:11
- Label: Tamla Motown, Spectrum

First released in November 1969.

Track Listing

1. "I Heard It Through the Grapevine" – Marvin Gaye
2. "I'm Gonna Make You Love Me" – Diana Ross & the Supremes and the Temptations
3. "My Cherie Amour" – Stevie Wonder
4. "This Old Heart of Mine (Is Weak for You)" – The Isley Brothers
5. "I'll Pick a Rose for My Rose" – Marv Johnson
6. "No Matter What Sign You Are" – Diana Ross & the Supremes
7. "I'm in a Different World" – The Four Tops
8. "Dancing in the Street" – Martha Reeves & the Vandellas
9. "For Once in My Life" – Stevie Wonder
10. "You're All I Need to Get By" – Marvin Gaye & Tammi Terrell
11. "Get Ready" – The Temptations
12. "Stop Her on Sight (S.O.S.)" – Edwin Starr
13. "Love Child" – Diana Ross & the Supremes
14. "Behind a Painted Smile" – The Isley Brothers
15. "(I'm a) Road Runner" – Jr. Walker & the All Stars
16. "The Tracks of My Tears" – Smokey Robinson & The Miracles

==== Charts ====
Chart (1970)	Peak position
UK Albums (OCC)	1

==== Certifications ====
Region	Certification	Certified units/sales
United Kingdom (BPI) sales since 1997	Platinum	300,000^{^}
^{^} Shipments figures based on certification alone.

=== Motown Chartbusters Volume 4 ===
Motown Chartbusters Volume 4

Compilation album by Various Artists
- Released: 1970 Album No STML11162
- Genre: R&B, Soul
- Label: Tamla Motown, Spectrum

First released in October 1970.

Track Listing

1. "I Want You Back" – The Jackson 5
2. "The Onion Song" – Marvin Gaye & Tammi Terrell
3. "I Can't Help Myself (Sugar Pie Honey Bunch)" – The Four Tops
4. "Up the Ladder to the Roof" – The Supremes
5. "I Can't Get Next to You" – The Temptations
6. "Too Busy Thinking About My Baby" – Marvin Gaye
7. "Yester-Me, Yester-You, Yesterday" – Stevie Wonder
8. "Someday We'll Be Together" – Diana Ross & the Supremes
9. "ABC" – The Jackson 5
10. "Never Had a Dream Come True" – Stevie Wonder
11. "Farewell Is a Lonely Sound" – Jimmy Ruffin
12. "Do What You Gotta Do" – The Four Tops
13. "I Second That Emotion" – Diana Ross & the Supremes with the Temptations
14. "Cloud Nine" – The Temptations
15. "What Does It Take (To Win Your Love)" – Jr. Walker & the All Stars
16. "Reach Out and Touch (Somebody's Hand)" – Diana Ross

==== Charts ====
Chart (1970)	Peak position
UK Albums (OCC)	1

==== Certifications ====
Region	Certification	Certified units/sales
United Kingdom (BPI) sales since 1997	Silver	60,000^{^}
^{^} Shipments figures based on certification alone.

=== Motown Chartbusters Volume 5 ===
Motown Chartbusters Volume 5

Compilation album by Various Artists
- Released: 1971 Album No STML11181
- Genre: R&B, Soul
- Label: Tamla Motown, Spectrum

First released in April 1971.

Track Listing

1. "The Tears of a Clown" – Smokey Robinson & the Miracles
2. "War" – Edwin Starr
3. "The Love You Save" – The Jackson 5
4. "Ball of Confusion (That's What the World Is Today)" – The Temptations
5. "It's All in the Game" – The Four Tops
6. "Heaven Help Us All" – Stevie Wonder
7. "It's Wonderful" – Jimmy Ruffin
8. "Ain't No Mountain High Enough" – Diana Ross
9. "Signed, Sealed, Delivered I'm Yours" – Stevie Wonder
10. "Stoned Love" – The Supremes
11. "Abraham, Martin and John" – Marvin Gaye
12. "Still Water (Love)" – The Four Tops
13. "Forget Me Not" – Martha Reeves & the Vandellas
14. "It's a Shame" – The Motown Spinners
15. "I'll Be There" – The Jackson 5
16. "I'll Say Forever My Love" – Jimmy Ruffin

==== Charts ====
Chart (1971)	Peak position
UK Albums (OCC)	1

==== Certifications ====
Region	Certification	Certified units/sales
United Kingdom (BPI) sales since 1997	Silver	60,000^{^}
^{^} Shipments figures based on certification alone.

=== Motown Chartbusters Volume 6 ===
Motown Chartbusters Volume 6

Compilation album by Various Artists
- Released: 1971 Album No STML11191
- Genre: R&B, Soul
- Label: Tamla Motown, Spectrum

First released in October 1971.

Track Listing

1. "I'm Still Waiting" – Diana Ross
2. "I Don't Blame You at All" – Smokey Robinson & the Miracles
3. "We Can Work It Out" – Stevie Wonder
4. "Never Can Say Goodbye" – The Jackson 5
5. "These Things Will Keep Me Loving You" – The Velvelettes
6. "Indiana Wants Me" – R. Dean Taylor
7. "River Deep – Mountain High" – The Supremes & the Four Tops
8. "Just My Imagination (Running Away with Me)" – The Temptations
9. "Nathan Jones" – The Supremes
10. "A Simple Game" – The Four Tops
11. "Heaven Must Have Sent You" – The Elgins
12. "It's Summer" – The Temptations
13. "Remember Me" – Diana Ross
14. "Mama's Pearl" – The Jackson 5
15. "(Come 'Round Here) I'm the One You Need" – Smokey Robinson & the Miracles
16. "Just Seven Numbers (Can Straighten Out My Life)" – The Four Tops

==== Charts ====
Chart (1971)	Peak position
UK Albums (OCC)	2

=== Motown Chartbusters Volume 7 ===
Motown Chartbusters Volume 7

Compilation album by Various Artists
- Released: 1972 Album No STML11215
- Genre: R&B, Soul
- Label: Tamla Motown, Spectrum

First released in November 1972.

Track Listing

1. "Automatically Sunshine" – The Supremes
2. "Just Walk in My Shoes" – Gladys Knight & the Pips
3. "Rockin' Robin" – Michael Jackson
4. "Take a Look Around" – The Temptations
5. "You Gotta Have Love in Your Heart" – The Supremes And The Four Tops
6. "If You Really Love Me" – Stevie Wonder
7. "Surrender" – Diana Ross
8. "Ain't No Sunshine" – Michael Jackson
9. "Superstar (Remember How You Got Where You Are)" – The Temptations
10. "Bless You" – Martha Reeves & the Vandellas
11. "Floy Joy" – The Supremes
12. "Walk in the Night" – Jr. Walker & the All Stars
13. "Doobedood'ndoobe, Doobedood'ndoobe, Doobedood'ndoo" – Diana Ross
14. "Festival Time" – The San Remo Golden Strings
15. "My Guy" – Mary Wells
16. "Got to Be There" – Michael Jackson

==== Charts ====
Chart (1972)	Peak position
UK Albums (OCC)	9

=== Motown Chartbusters Volume 8 ===
Motown Chartbusters Volume 8

Compilation album by Various Artists
- Released: 1973 Album No STML11246
- Genre: R&B, Soul
- Label: Tamla Motown, Spectrum

Track Listing

1. "Superstition" – Stevie Wonder
2. "Neither One of Us (Wants to Be the First to Say Goodbye)" – Gladys Knight & the Pips
3. "Law of the Land" – The Temptations
4. "Take Me Girl, I'm Ready" – Jr. Walker & the All Stars
5. "Skywriter" – The Jackson 5
6. "Touch Me in the Morning" – Diana Ross
7. "The Look of Love" – Gladys Knight & the Pips
8. "Morning Glow" – Michael Jackson
9. "Papa Was a Rollin' Stone" – The Temptations
10. "Let's Get It On" – Marvin Gaye
11. "Bad Weather" – The Supremes
12. "Ben" – Michael Jackson
13. "You Are the Sunshine of My Life" – Stevie Wonder
14. "Hallelujah Day" – The Jackson 5
15. "Way Back Home" – Jr. Walker & the All Stars
16. "Help Me Make It Through the Night" – Gladys Knight & the Pips

==== Charts ====
Chart (1973)	Peak position
UK Albums (OCC)	9

==== Certifications ====
Region	Certification	Certified units/sales
United Kingdom (BPI)	Gold	100,000^{^}
^{^} Shipments figures based on certification alone.

=== Motown Chartbusters Volume 9 ===
Motown Chartbusters Volume 9

Compilation album by Various Artists
- Released: 1974 Album No STML11270
- Genre: R&B, Soul
- Label: Tamla Motown, Spectrum

First released in October 1974.

Track Listing

1. "All of My Life" – Diana Ross
2. "Higher Ground" – Stevie Wonder
3. "Dancing Machine" – The Jackson 5
4. "My Mistake (Was to Love You)" – Diana Ross & Marvin Gaye
5. "Spinnin' and Spinnin'" – Syreeta
6. "Keep on Truckin'" – Eddie Kendricks
7. "There's a Ghost in My House" – R. Dean Taylor
8. "Just My Soul Responding" – Smokey Robinson
9. "Last Time I Saw Him" – Diana Ross
10. "You Are Everything" – Diana Ross & Marvin Gaye
11. "He's Misstra Know-It-All" – Stevie Wonder
12. "Baby Love" – Diana Ross & the Supremes
13. "What Becomes of the Brokenhearted" – Jimmy Ruffin
14. "Living for the City" – Stevie Wonder
15. "Love Me" – Diana Ross
16. "Boogie Down" – Eddie Kendricks
17. "Machine Gun" – Commodores

==== Charts ====
Chart (1974)	Peak position
UK Albums (OCC)	14

=== Motown Chartbusters Volume 10 ===
Motown Chartbusters Volume 10

Compilation album by Various Artists
- Released: 1979 Album No STML12123
- Genre: R&B, Soul
- Label: Tamla Motown, Spectrum

First released in November 1979.

Some of the later releases were stamped in red vinyl.

Track Listing

1. "Three Times a Lady" – The Commodores
2. "Love Hangover" – Diana Ross
3. "The Night" – Frankie Valli & the Four Seasons
4. "Got to Give It Up – Marvin Gaye
5. "Get It Up for Love" – Tata Vega
6. "The Boss" – Diana Ross
7. "Big Time" – Smokey Robinson
8. "Your Kiss Is Sweet" – Syreeta
9. "Theme from Mahogany (Do You Know Where You're Going To)" – Diana Ross
10. "Easy" – The Commodores
11. "I'm a Sucker for Your Love" – Teena Marie
12. "Love Machine" – The Miracles
13. "It Should Have Been Me" – Yvonne Fair
14. "You and I" – Rick James
15. "Don't Leave Me This Way" – Thelma Houston
16. "Sail On" – The Commodores

=== Motown Chartbusters Volume 11 ===
Motown Chartbusters Volume 11

Compilation album by Various Artists
- Released: 1980 Album No STML12139
- Genre: R&B, Soul
- Label: Tamla Motown, Spectrum

First released in December 1980 as "Motown Chartbusters '80". Renamed for CD release later.

An album also called Motown Chartbusters '80 was released in the same year on the Astor label (6264 187) in Australia. It had the exact track listing as Motown Chartbusters Volume 11. The cover was almost identical, with just minor changes.

Track Listing

1. "Upside Down" – Diana Ross
2. "Behind the Groove" – Teena Marie
3. "It Will Come in Time" – Billy Preston & Syreeta
4. "Still" – The Commodores
5. "Big Time" – Rick James
6. "Make Me Yours" – High Inergy
7. "Let's Get Serious" – Jermaine Jackson
8. "It's My House" – Diana Ross
9. "With You I'm Born Again" – Billy Preston & Syreeta
10. "Burnin' Hot" – Jermaine Jackson
11. "My Old Piano" – Diana Ross
12. "He's Gone" – Syreeta
13. "I Need Your Lovin'" – Teena Marie
14. "Wonderland" – The Commodores
15. "Cruisin'" – Smokey Robinson
16. "The Last Song" – Lynda Carter

=== Motown Chartbusters Volume 12 ===
Motown Chartbusters Volume 12

Compilation album by Various Artists
- Released: 1982 Album No STML12164
- Genre: R&B, Soul
- Label: Tamla Motown, Spectrum

First released in July 1982.

Track Listing

1. "Being with You" – Smokey Robinson
2. "Lady (You Bring Me Up)" – The Commodores
3. "We're Almost There" – Michael Jackson
4. "Endless Love" – Diana Ross & Lionel Richie
5. "Give It to Me Baby" – Rick James
6. "I'm Coming Out" – Diana Ross
7. "You Like Me Don't You" – Jermaine Jackson
8. "It Must Be Magic" – Teena Marie
9. "Oh No" – The Commodores
10. "One Day in Your Life" – Michael Jackson
11. "Tenderness" – Diana Ross
12. "Tell Me Tomorrow" – Smokey Robinson
13. "I Wanna Be Where You Are" – José Feliciano
14. "I Must Be in Love" – Syreeta
15. "Why You Wanna Try Me" – The Commodores
16. "Paradise in Your Eyes" – Jermaine Jackson
17. "Super Freak" – Rick James
18. "It's My Turn" – Diana Ross

== United States Motown Chartbusters ==
Three years later after the first release of British Motown Chartbusters, Motown released a series called “Motown Chartbusters" on the Motown label in the United States. This consisted of only five albums which had completely different track listings to the UK releases.

Another difference was the number of tracks per album, the UK version consisted of 16 to 18 tracks, whereas the US version only had 12 tracks.

=== US – Motown Chartbusters Volume 1 ===
Motown Chartbusters Volume 1

Compilation album by Various Artists
- Released: MS-707
- Genre: R&B, Soul
- Label: Motown

First released in October 1970.

Track Listing

1. Try It Baby – Marvin Gaye
2. (I Know) I'm Losing You – Temptations
3. (I'm A) Road Runner – Jr. Walker & All Stars
4. You're All I Need To Get By – Marvin Gaye & Tammi Terrell
5. Mickey's Monkey – Smokey Robinson & Miracles
6. Back in My Arms Again – Diana Ross & Supremes
7. Blowin' in the Wind – Stevie Wonder
8. You've Made Me So Very Happy – Brenda Holloway
9. I'm Ready For Love – Martha Reeves & Vandellas
10. "Ooo Baby Baby" – Smokey Robinson & Miracles
11. Danger Heartbreak Dead Ahead – Marvelettes
12. It's Growing – Temptations

=== US – Motown Chartbusters Volume 2 ===
Motown Chartbusters Volume 2

Compilation album by Various Artists
- Released: MS-715
- Genre: R&B, Soul
- Label: Motown

First released in October 1970.

Track Listing

1. Bernadette – Four Tops
2. My Baby – Temptations
3. Come See About Me – Diana Ross & Supremes
4. I Want You Back – Jackson 5
5. Nowhere To Run – Martha Reeves & Vandellas
6. Too Many Fish In The Sea – Marvelettes
7. More Love – Smokey Robinson & Miracles
8. Everybody Needs Love – Gladys Knight & Pips
9. What Does It Take (To Win Your Love) – Jr. Walker & All Stars
10. I Wish It Would Rain – Temptations
11. Hitch Hike – Marvin Gaye
12. This Old Heart Of Mine (Is Weak For You) – Isley Brothers

=== US – Motown Chartbusters Volume 3 ===
Motown Chartbusters Volume 3

Compilation album by Various Artists
- Recorded: MS-732
- Genre: R&B, Soul
- Label: Motown

First released in May 1971.

Track Listing

1. Up The Ladder To The Roof – Supremes
2. Gotta Hold On To This Feeling – Jr. Walker & All Stars
3. It's All In The Game – Four Tops
4. For Once In My Life – Stevie Wonder
5. Baby I'm For Real – The Originals (band)
6. It's A Shame – Spinners
7. Love Child – Diana Ross & Supremes
8. ABC – Jackson Five
9. Psychedelic Shack – Temptations
10. Friendship Train – Gladys Knight & Pips
11. Honey Child – Martha Reeves & Vandellas
12. Twenty-Five Miles – Edwin Starr

=== US – Motown Chartbusters Volume 4 ===
Motown Chartbusters Volume 4

Compilation album by Various Artists
- Released: MS-734
- Genre: R&B, Soul
- Label: Motown

First released in May 1971.

Track Listing

1. The Love You Save – Jackson 5
2. You Need Love Like I Do (Don't You) – Gladys Knight & Pips
3. Do You See My Love (For You Growing) – Jr. Walker & All Stars
4. I Can't Get Next To You – Temptations
5. Too Busy Thinking About My Baby – Marvin Gaye
6. War – Edwin Starr
7. Someday We'll Be Together – Diana Ross & Supremes
8. The Tears Of A Clown – Smokey Robinson
9. My Whole World Ended (The Moment You Left Me) – David Ruffin
10. Signed Sealed Delivered I'm Yours – Stevie Wonder
11. Still Water (Love) – Four Tops
12. The Bells – The Originals

=== US – Motown Chartbusters Volume 5 ===
Motown Chartbusters Volume 5

Compilation album by Various Artists
- Released: M-744L
- Genre: R&B, Soul
- Label: Motown

First released in December 1971.

Track Listing

1. I'll Be There – Jackson 5
2. I Was Made To Love Her – Stevie Wonder
3. Everybody's Got The Right To Love – Supremes
4. These Eyes – Jr. Walker & All Stars
5. Ain't Nothing Like The Real Thing – Marvin Gaye & Tammi Terrell
6. River Deep-Mountain High – Supremes & Four Tops
7. Ain't No Mountain High Enough – Diana Ross
8. I Second That Emotion – Smokey Robinson & Miracles
9. It's A Shame – Spinners
10. Ball Of Confusion (That's What The World Is Today) – Temptations
11. Does Your Mama Know About Me – Bobby Taylor & the Vancouvers
12. I Love You Madly – The Fantastic Four

== Boxed sets ==
=== Original British released boxed sets ===
Motown Chartbusters Boxed sets

Compilation album by Various Artists
- Genre: R&B, Soul
- Label: Motown

- Motown Chartbusters boxed set Volumes 1–3 Contains Vol 1–3
- Motown Chartbusters boxed set Volumes 4–6 Contains Vol 4–6
- Motown Chartbusters boxed set Volumes 1–6 Contains Vol 1–6
- Motown Chartbusters boxed set Volumes 7–12 Contains Vol 7–12

=== Motown Chartbusters 150 Hits of gold ===
Motown Chartbusters 150 Hits Of Gold

Compilation album by Various Artists
- Released: 1985 WL72410[9]
- Genre: R&B, Soul
- Label: Motown

First released in 1985.

Track Listing

Volume 1

1. Mary Wells – My Guy
2. Diana Ross And The Supremes – Where Did Our Love Go
3. Diana Ross And The Supremes – Baby Love
4. Martha Reeves And The Vandellas – Nowhere To Run
5. Diana Ross And The Supremes – Stop! In The Name Of Love
6. Stevie Wonder – "Uptight (Everything's Alright)"
7. Four Tops – Loving You Is Sweeter Than Ever
8. The Temptations – "Ain't Too Proud to Beg"
9. Jr Walker And The All Stars – How Sweet It Is (To Be Loved By You)
10. Diana Ross And The Supremes – "You Can't Hurry Love"
11. Four Tops – "Reach Out I'll Be There"
12. The Temptations – "Beauty Is Only Skin Deep"
13. Jimmy Ruffin – What Becomes Of The Broken Hearted
14. Diana Ross And The Supremes – You Keep Me Hangin' On
15. Martha Reeves And The Vandellas – I'm Ready For Love
16. The Temptations – (I Know) I'm Losing You
17. Stevie Wonder – A Place In The Sun
18. Four Tops – Standing In The Shadows Of Love
19. Marvin Gaye And Kim Weston – It Takes Two
20. Diana Ross And The Supremes – Love Is Here And Now You're Gone

Volume 2

1. Four Tops – Bernadette
2. Martha Reeves And The Vandellas – Jimmy Mack
3. Diana Ross And The Supremes – The Happening
4. Four Tops – 7 Rooms Of Gloom
5. Gladys Knight And The Pips – Take Me In Your Arms And Love Me
6. Stevie Wonder – I Was Made To Love Her
7. The Marvelettes – When You're Young And In Love
8. Diana Ross And The Supremes – Reflections
9. Stevie Wonder – I'm Wondering
10. Diana Ross And The Supremes – In And Out Of Love
11. Four Tops – Walk Away Renee
12. R Dean Taylor – Gotta See Jane
13. Four Tops – If I Were A Carpenter
14. Marvin Gaye And Tammi Terrell – You're All I Need To Get By
15. Four Tops – Yesterday's Dreams
16. Isley Brothers – This Old Heart Of Mine (Is Weak For You)
17. Diana Ross And The Supremes – Love Child
18. Stevie Wonder – For Once In My Life
19. Edwin Starr – Stop Her On Sight (S.O.S.)
20. Isley Brothers – I Guess I'll Always Love You

Volume 3

1. Martha Reeves And The Vandellas – Dancing In The Street
2. Marvin Gaye And Tammi Terrell – You Ain't Livin' Till You're Lovin'
3. Mary Johnson – I'll Pick A Rose For My Rose
4. Diana Ross And The Supremes And The Temptations – I'm Gonna Make You Love Me
5. Marvin Gaye – I Heard It Through The Breakdown
6. The Temptations – Get Ready
7. Stevie Wonder – Don't Know Why I Love You
8. Jr Walker And The All Stars – (I'm A) Road Runner
9. Isley Brothers – Behind A Painted Smile
10. Diana Ross And The Supremes – I'm Livin' In Shame
11. Smokey Robinson And The Miracles – The Tracks Of My Tears
12. Four Tops – What Is A Man
13. Stevie Wonder – My Cherie Amour
14. Marvin Gaye – Too Busy Thinking About My Baby
15. The Temptations – Cloud Nine
16. Isley Brothers – Put Yourself In My Place
17. Diana Ross And The Supremes And The Temptations – I Second That Emotion
18. Four Tops – Do What You Gotta Do
19. Jr Walker And The All Stars – What Does It Take
20. Stevie Wonder – Yester-Me, Yester-You, Yesterday

Volume 4

1. Diana Ross And The Supremes – Someday We'll Be Together
2. Marvin Gaye And Tammi Terrell – The Onion Song
3. The Temptations – I Can't Get Next To You
4. Jackson 5 – I Want You Back
5. Jimmy Ruffin – Farewell Is A Lonely Sound
6. Four Tops – I Can't Help Myself
7. Stevie Wonder – Never Had A Dream Come True
8. The Supremes – Up The Ladder To The Roof
9. Jackson 5 – ABC
10. Marvin Gaye – Abraham, Martin And John
11. Four Tops – It's All In The Game
12. Jimmy Ruffin – I'll Say Forever My Love
13. Stevie Wonder – Signed, Sealed, Delivered I'm Yours
14. Jackson 5 – The Love You Save
15. Smokey Robinson And The Miracles – The Tears Of A Clown
16. Diana Ross – Ain't No Mountain High Enough
17. The Temptations – Ball Of Confusion (That's What The World Is Today)
18. Four Tops – Still Water (Love)
19. Jimmy Ruffin – It's Wonderful (To Be Loved By You)
20. Edwin Starr – War

Volume 5

1. Jackson 5 – I'll Be There
2. Detroit Spinners – It's A Shame
3. The Supremes – Stoned Love
4. Smokey Robinson And The Miracles – (Come Round Here) I'm The One You Need
5. Martha Reeves And The Vandellas – Forget Me Not
6. Diana Ross – Remember Me
7. R Dean Taylor – Indiana Wants Me
8. The Elgins – Heaven Must Have Sent You
9. Smokey Robinson And The Miracles – I Don't Blame You At All
10. The Temptations – Just My Imagination (Running Away With Me)
11. The Supremes And Four Tops – River Deep – Mountain High
12. Diana Ross – I'm Still Waiting
13. The Supremes – Nathan Jones
14. Four Tops – Simple Game
15. Diana Ross – Surrender
16. Stevie Wonder – If You Really Love Me
17. Michael Jackson – Got To Be There
18. The Supremes – Floy Joy

Volume 6

1. The Temptations – Take A Look Around
2. Diana Ross – Doobedood'ndoobe, Doobedood'ndoobe, Doobedood'ndoo
3. Michael Jackson – Rockin' Robin
4. The Supremes – Automatically Sunshine
5. Michael Jackson – Ain't No Sunshine
6. Jr Walker And The All Stars – Walk In The Night
7. Jackson 5 – Lookin' Through The Windows
8. Michael Jackson – Ben
9. Gladys Knight And The Pips – Help Me Make It Through The Night
10. The Temptations – Papa Was A Rollin' Stone
11. Jackson 5 – Doctor My Eyes
12. Jr Walker And The All Stars – Take Me Girl I'm Ready
13. Gladys Knight And The Pips – The Look Of Love
14. Jackson 5 – Hallelujah Day
15. Diana Ross – Touch Me In The Morning
16. Eddie Kendricks – Keep On Truckin' (Part 1)
17. Diana Ross – All Of My Life
18. Diana Ross And Marvin Gaye – You Are Everything

Volume 7

1. Commodores – Machine Gun
2. R. Dean Taylor – There's A Ghost In My House
3. Syreeta – Your Kiss Is Sweet
4. Frankie Valli & the Four Seasons – The Night
5. The Miracles – Love Machine (Part 1)
6. David Ruffin – Walk Away From Love
7. Diana Ross – Theme From Mahogany (Do You Know Where You're Going To)
8. Yvonne Fair – It Should Have Been Me 3:04
9. Diana Ross – Love Hangover
10. Thelma Houston – Don't Leave Me This Way
11. Commodores – Easy
12. Marvin Gaye – Got To Give It Up
13. Commodores – Three Times A Lady
14. Diana Ross – Gettin' Ready for Love
15. Commodores – Sail On
16. Billy Preston & Syreeta – With You I'm Born Again
17. Commodores – Still
18. Jermaine Jackson – Let's Get Serious

Volume 8

1. Diana Ross – Upside Down
2. Teena Marie – Behind The Groove
3. Diana Ross – My Old Piano
4. Diana Ross – I'm Coming Out
5. Smokey Robinson – Being With You
6. Diana Ross – It's My Turn
7. Michael Jackson – One Day In Your Life
8. Charlene – I've Never Been To Me
9. Diana Ross & Lionel Richie – Endless Love
10. Mary Jane Girls – All Night Long
11. Rockwell – Somebody's Watching Me
12. Michael Jackson – Farewell My Summer Love
13. The Dazz Band – Let It All Blow
14. The Temptations – Treat Her Like A Lady
15. Commodores – Nightshift
16. DeBarge – Rhythm Of The Night

Volume 9

1. Rick James – Glow
2. Mary Jane Girls – In My House
3. Maureen Steele – Save The Night For Me
4. Michael Lovesmith – Break The Ice
5. Rockwell – Peeping Tom
6. Willie Hutch – Keep On Jammin'
7. The Dazz Band – Hotspot
8. The Four Tops – Sexy Ways
9. DeBarge – Who's Holding Donna Now
10. Dennis Edwards – Coolin' Out

== Other Motown Chartbusters ==
Motown Chartbusters

Compilation album by Various Artists
- Released: 1986
- Genre: R&B, Soul
- Label: Telstar

This version was released on the Telstar label in 1986; it is not part of the original series.

Track Listing

1. The Supremes – You Keep Me Hangin' On
2. Martha and the Vandellas – Dancing in the Street
3. The Isley Brothers – This Old Heart of Mine (Is Weak for You)
4. Marvin Gaye – I Heard it Through the Grapevine
5. Four Tops – Reach Out, I'll Be There
6. Stevie Wonder – For Once in My Life
7. Marvin Gaye & Tammi Terrell – The Onion Song
8. Edwin Starr – War
9. Smokey Robinson and The Miracles – The Tears of a Clown
10. The Supremes – Baby Love
11. Jimmy Ruffin – What Becomes of the Brokenhearted
12. Jackson 5 – I'll Be There
13. Mary Wells – My Guy
14. The Supremes & the Temptations – I'm Gonna Make You Love Me
15. Four Tops – Walk Away Renee
16. Diana Ross and Lionel Richie – Endless Love
17. Michael Jackson – Ben
18. The Temptations – Just My Imagination (Running Away with Me)
19. Commodores – Still
20. Diana Ross – I'm Still Waiting

== See also ==
- Hitsville U.S.A.
- List of Motown No. 1 singles in the United States
- List of Motown artists
- List of record labels
- Motown 1's
- Music of Detroit
- Motown
- Universal Motown
- Now That's What I Call Motown
- Motown discography
