= Tamla Motown Gold: The Sound of Young America =

Compilation album by Various Artists
- Released: 2001
- Recorded: 1959–1970
- Genre: R&B/soul
- Label: Universal Music Group

Tamla Motown Gold: The Sound of Young America is a three-disc compilation album released by the Tamla Motown label in 2001. It features all the hits from the label in the 1960s, by various artists.

== Track listing ==
=== Disc 1 ===
1. Barrett Strong - Money (That's What I Want)
2. Smokey Robinson & The Miracles - Shop Around
3. The Marvelettes - Please Mr. Postman
4. The Contours - Do You Love Me
5. The Marvelettes - Beechwood 4-5789
6. Marvin Gaye - Stubborn Kind Of Fellow
7. Stevie Wonder - Fingertips
8. Martha Reeves & The Vandellas - (Love Is Like A) Heatwave
9. Marvin Gaye - How Sweet It Is (To Be Loved By You)
10. The Temptations - The Way You Do The Things You Do
11. Four Tops - Baby I Need Your Loving
12. The Velvelettes - Needle in a Haystack
13. Diana Ross & The Supremes - Baby Love
14. Martha Reeves & The Vandellas - Dancing in the Street
15. Brenda Holloway - Every Little Bit Hurts
16. Diana Ross & The Supremes - Where Did Our Love Go?
17. The Temptations - My Girl
18. Mary Wells - My Guy
19. The Velvelettes - He Was Really Sayin' Somethin'
20. Diana Ross & The Supremes - Come See About Me
21. Smokey Robinson & The Miracles - The Tracks Of My Tears
22. Martha Reeves & The Vandellas - Nowhere to Run
23. Four Tops - I Can't Help Myself (Sugar Pie, Honey Bunch)
24. Diana Ross & The Supremes - Stop! In the Name of Love
25. Junior Walker & the Allstars - "Shotgun"
26. Kim Weston - Take Me In Your Arms (Rock Me a Little While)
27. Diana Ross & The Supremes - Back in My Arms Again
28. Smokey Robinson & The Miracles - Going To A Go-Go

=== Disc 2 ===
1. Four Tops - It's The Same Old Song
2. Junior Walker & the Allstars - (I'm a) Road Runner
3. Diana Ross & The Supremes - I Hear a Symphony
4. Four Tops - Loving You Is Sweeter Than Ever
5. The Isley Brothers - This Old Heart of Mine (Is Weak For You)
6. Marvin Gaye & Kim Weston - It Takes Two
7. Stevie Wonder - Uptight (Everything's Alright)
8. The Temptations - Ain't Too Proud To Beg
9. Four Tops - Reach Out, I'll Be There
10. Diana Ross & The Supremes - You Can't Hurry Love
11. The Isley Brothers - I Guess I'll Always Love You
12. Junior Walker & the Allstars - How Sweet It Is (To Be Loved By You)
13. Stevie Wonder - A Place in the Sun
14. The Temptations - Beauty Is Only Skin Deep
15. Four Tops - Standing in the Shadows of Love
16. Diana Ross & The Supremes - You Keep Me Hangin' On
17. The Isley Brothers - Put Yourself In My Place
18. Jimmy Ruffin - What Becomes of the Broken Hearted
19. Four Tops - Bernadette
20. Diana Ross & The Supremes - Love Is Here and Now You're Gone
21. Gladys Knight & the Pips - I Heard It Through the Grapevine
22. The Isley Brothers - Behind a Painted Smile
23. Smokey Robinson & The Miracles - I Second That Emotion
24. Four Tops - You Keep Running Away
25. Diana Ross & The Supremes - The Happening
26. Gladys Knight & The Pips - Take Me in Your Arms and Love Me
27. The Marvelettes - When You're Young and in Love
28. Marvin Gaye & Tammi Terrell - Ain't No Mountain High Enough

=== Disc 3 ===
1. Four Tops - Walk Away Renée
2. Diana Ross & The Supremes - Reflections
3. Jimmy Ruffin - Gonna Give Her All the Love I've Got
4. Stevie Wonder - I Was Made to Love Her
5. Martha Reeves & The Vandellas - Jimmy Mack
6. Four Tops - If I Were a Carpenter
7. Marvin Gaye & Tammi Terrell - Ain't Nothing Like The Real Thing
8. Diana Ross & The Supremes - In and Out of Love
9. The Temptations - Cloud Nine
10. Stevie Wonder - For Once in My Life
11. Marvin Gaye - I Heard It Through the Grapevine
12. Diana Ross & The Supremes with The Temptations - I'm Gonna Make You Love Me
13. Stevie Wonder - I Don't Know Why I Love You
14. Marvin Gaye & Tammi Terrell - You're All I Need to Get By
15. Diana Ross & The Supremes with The Temptations - I Second That Emotion
16. Edwin Starr - 25 Miles
17. Diana Ross & The Supremes - Love Child
18. Stevie Wonder - My Cherie Amour
19. Marvin Gaye & Tammi Terrell - The Onion Song
20. Junior Walker & the Allstars - What Does It Take (To Win Your Love)
21. Diana Ross & The Supremes - Someday We'll Be Together
22. David Ruffin - My World Ended (The Moment You Left Me)
23. The Originals - Baby, I'm For Real
24. Marvin Gaye - Too Busy Thinking About My Baby
25. Stevie Wonder - Yester-Me, Yester-You, Yesterday
26. Rare Earth - Get Ready

== Charts ==
Chart (2001)	Peak position
UK Compilation Albums (OCC)	7
UK R&B Albums (OCC)	2

== Certifications ==
Region	Certification	Certified units/sales
United Kingdom (BPI)	Platinum	300,000^{^}
^{^} Shipments figures based on certification alone.
