= Now That's What I Call Motown =

Compilation album by Various artists
- Released: January 13, 2009
- Recorded: Various times
- Genre: Pop, R&B
- Length: 78:21
- Label: Universal Motown

Series chronology
The Best of Now That's What I Call Music! 10th Anniversary (2008)	Now That's What I Call Motown (2009)	Now That's What I Call Music! Vol. 30 (2009)

Professional ratings
Review scores
Source	Rating
Allmusic	link

Now That's What I Call Motown is a special edition compilation album from the (U.S.) Now That's What I Call Music! series and was released on January 13, 2009. Released by Universal Motown Records to coincide with the 50th anniversary of Motown Records, the album is made up of songs exclusively from the original Motown label.

== Track listing ==
No.	Title	Artist	Length
1.	"Money (That's What I Want)"	Barrett Strong	2:36
2.	"Please Mr. Postman"	The Marvelettes	2:29
3.	"Shop Around"	The Miracles	2:49
4.	"Do You Love Me"	The Contours	2:53
5.	"Dancing in the Street"	Martha and the Vandellas	2:39
6.	"My Guy"	Mary Wells	2:52
7.	"My Girl"	The Temptations	2:58
8.	"Stop! In the Name of Love"	The Supremes	2:52
9.	"Shotgun"	Jr. Walker & the All Stars	3:19
10.	"I Can't Help Myself (Sugar Pie Honey Bunch)"	Four Tops	2:45
11.	"You Keep Me Hangin' On"	The Supremes	2:41
12.	"Ain't Nothing Like the Real Thing"	Marvin Gaye & Tammi Terrell	2:13
13.	"I Heard It Through the Grapevine"	Marvin Gaye	3:13
14.	"I Can't Get Next to You"	The Temptations	2:52
15.	"I Want You Back"	The Jackson 5	2:59
16.	"Signed, Sealed, Delivered I'm Yours"	Stevie Wonder	2:39
17.	"War"	Edwin Starr	3:22
18.	"The Tears of a Clown"	Smokey Robinson & The Miracles	3:00
19.	"What's Going On"	Marvin Gaye	3:54
20.	"Neither One of Us (Wants to Be the First to Say Goodbye)"	Gladys Knight & the Pips	4:23
21.	"Let's Get It On"	Marvin Gaye	4:52
22.	"Love Machine – Pt. I"	The Miracles featuring Billy Griffin	3:00
23.	"Brick House"	The Commodores	3:28
24.	"Upside Down"	Diana Ross	4:03
25.	"Super Freak (Part 1)"	Rick James	3:24

== Charts ==
Chart (2009)	Peak position
The Billboard 200	13
Billboard Top R&B/Hip-Hop Albums	12
