= Motown 1's =

Motown 1s

Compilation album by various artists
- Released: 20 April 2004
- Genre: R&B
- Label: Motown/UTV

Motown 1s is a collection of 24 No. 1 songs originally released by Motown Records, plus a newly recorded bonus track, "Ain't No Mountain High Enough," performed by Michael McDonald. It was originally released on CD by Motown Records/UTV Records on 20 April 2004. A CD reissue followed on 3 April 2007. Fifteen years after its initial release, the compilation was given a deluxe double gold vinyl reissue on 30 August 2019.

== Track listing ==
1. Motown 1s Intro (0:04)
2. "Please Mr. Postman" – The Marvelettes (2:29)
3. "(Love Is Like a) Heat Wave" – Martha and the Vandellas (2:44)
4. "My Guy" – Mary Wells (2:53)
5. "My Girl" – The Temptations (2:56)
6. "Where Did Our Love Go" – The Supremes (2:41)
7. "Stop! In the Name of Love" – The Supremes (2:59)
8. "Shotgun" – Junior Walker & The All-Stars (2:57)
9. "I Can't Help Myself (Sugar Pie Honey Bunch)" – Four Tops (2:45)
10. "Uptight (Everything's Alright)" – Stevie Wonder (2:54)
11. "Ain't Too Proud to Beg" – The Temptations (2:33)
12. "Reach Out I'll Be There" – Four Tops (3:00)
13. "Ain't Nothing Like the Real Thing" – Marvin Gaye & Tammi Terrell (2:15)
14. "I Heard It Through the Grapevine" – Marvin Gaye (3:15)
15. "I Want You Back" – The Jackson 5 (3:00)
16. "War" – Edwin Starr (3:21)
17. "The Tears of a Clown" – Smokey Robinson & The Miracles (3:01)
18. "What's Going On" – Marvin Gaye (3:52)
19. "Let's Get It On" – Marvin Gaye (4:02)
20. "Love Machine (Part 1)" – The Miracles (2:59)
21. "Don't Leave Me This Way" – Thelma Houston (3:40)
22. "Three Times a Lady" – Commodores (3:38)
23. "Endless Love" – Diana Ross & Lionel Richie (4:26)
24. "Rhythm of the Night" – DeBarge (3:55)
25. "I'll Make Love to You" – Boyz II Men (3:57)
26. "Ain't No Mountain High Enough" – Michael McDonald (2:48)

== Charts ==
Chart (2004)	Peak position
US Billboard 200	27
US Compilation Albums (Billboard)	1
US Top R&B/Hip-Hop Albums (Billboard)	41

== See also ==
- Motown discography
