= Motown discography =

The discography for American rhythm and blues record label Motown, as well as its subsidiaries and imprints, is divided into:

- Motown albums discography
- Motown singles discography

== Motown subsidiary labels ==
The label was purchased by Universal Music and is now branded as Universal Motown.

=== Major divisions ===
- Gordy Records
- Motown Records
- Tamla Records
- Tamla-Motown Records

=== Secondary R&B labels ===
- Check-Mate Records
- Miracle Records
- Motown Yesteryear
- MoWest Records
- Soul Records
- V.I.P. Records
- Weed Records

=== Alternative genre labels ===
==== Country ====
- Hitsville Records
- Mel-o-dy Records

==== Hip hop/rap ====
- Mad Sounds Recordings
- Never Broke Again
- Quality Control Music
- Wondirection Records

==== Jazz ====
- Workshop Jazz Records
- Blaze Records
- Mo Jazz Records

==== Rock ====
- Morocco Records
- Prodigal Records
- Rare Earth Records

==== Other ====
- Black Forum Records
- Divinity Records
- Motown Latino Records
- Natural Resources Records
- Ocean Front Records

=== Independent labels distributed by Motown ===
- Biv 10 Records
- Chisa Records
- CTI Records
- Ecology Records
- Gull Records
- Manticore Records
- Three Brothers Records

=== British (pre-Tamla-Motown) labels ===
- Fontana Records
- London American Records
- Oriole Records
- Stateside Records

=== Miscellaneous labels associated with Motown ===
- Fliphits
- Gaiee
- Illtown
- Inferno Records
- IPG Records
- Mad Sounds
- MC Records
- Melodyland
- Rayber Records
- Rich Records
- Summer Camp Records
