= Ethiopia Habtemariam =

American businesswoman and music executive

- ኢትዮጵያ ሀብተማርያም
- Born: September 24, 1979 (age 46); Berkeley, California, U.S.
- Occupations: Music executive, businesswoman
- Years active: 1990s–present
- Employer: Universal Music Group
- Known for: Chair and CEO of Motown Records (2021–2022)
- Title: President of Motown Records (2014–2022)
- Predecessor: Barry Weiss (as Universal Motown)
- Successor: Vacant (label restructuring)
- Awards: Billboard Women in Music Impact List (2013); Billboard Power 100 (2023)

Ethiopia Habtemariam (Amharic: ኢትዮጵያ ሀብተማርያም; born September 24, 1979) is an American businesswoman and music executive who served as the chair and chief executive officer of Motown Records from 2021 to 2022. She is Ethiopian-American.

She was born in Berkeley, California. In 1994, at the age of 14, Habtemariam began interning at LaFace Records, a label created by former chairman and CEO of Epic Records, L.A. Reid. This internship lasted 4 years. Shortly after, Ethiopia began working with Universal Music Group. In 2011, Habtemariam was named the Senior Vice President of Motown Records, working with artists Stevie Wonder, Erykah Badu, Ne-Yo, Kem, BJ the Chicago Kid, Stacey Barthe, and more. Billboard named Habtemariam to both their 30 Under 30, 40 Under 40 lists, and "Power 100" lists. In 2013, The Hollywood Reporter's “Women in Music” issue and Variety Magazine named her to their "Women's Impact List." In 2014, Habtemariam was promoted to President of Motown Records and currently serves as the President of Motown Records and President of Urban Music/Co-Head of Creative at Universal Publishing Music Group in the United States.

At the age of 16, Habtemariam wrote a letter to Sylvia Rhone, in awe of the fact that a black woman was the chair of a major record label. Once Habtemariam herself became a record executive and President of Motown Records, she received a similar fan letter. Her fan, a 16-year-old student enrolled in a Bonus Tracks music program, wrote about how the image of black woman in a position of power was influencing young students of color.

During her internship at LaFace, Habtemariam was exposed to numerous examples of women of color in the industry. She cites her strong examples of female leadership as her motivation to help young girls come up into positions of power.

In an interview with Billboard, Habtemariam discussed how, as a black woman, she had to prove herself to those who doubted her: “I heard people say, ‘Oh, she got the job just because she's a black woman and they're just trying to cover their asses,’” she says. “OK, cool. Even if that was the case, it's on me. What am I going to do to make an impact and assure that other people get these kinds of opportunities in the future? Plus, I love proving people wrong.” Habtemariam has said that with the support of family and communities, women of color can shift their focus to become significant parts of the music industry.

Habtemariam announced her departure from Motown Records on November 29, 2022.
