= Motown Gold =

Motown Gold: Motown's 18 Greatest Hits

Compilation album by Various Artists
- Released: 1975 and 1977
- Genre: R&B, Soul
- Label: Tamla Motown

Motown Gold is a set of compilation albums released by the Tamla Motown label. The first album released in 1975, was a top 10 hit in the UK, where it charted for 35 weeks, whilst Vol. 2 (1977) reached the top 30.

== Track listing ==
=== Motown Gold ===
Side one
No.	Title	Artist	Length
1.	"Reach Out, I'll Be There"	Four Tops
2.	"Baby Love"	The Supremes
3.	"I Heard It Through The Grapevine"	Marvin Gaye
4.	"I'm Gonna Make You Love Me"	Diana Ross & The Supremes and The Temptations
5.	"Walk in the Night"	Jr. Walker & The All Stars
6.	"I'm Still Waiting"	Diana Ross
7.	"Yester-Me, Yester-You, Yesterday"	Stevie Wonder
8.	"I'll Be There"	The Jackson 5
9.	"Jimmy Mack"	Martha Reeves & The Vandellas

Side two
No.	Title	Artist	Length
1.	"You Are Everything"	Diana Ross and Marvin Gaye
2.	"Help Me Make It Through the Night"	Gladys Knight & the Pips
3.	"What Becomes of the Broken Hearted"	Jimmy Ruffin
4.	"Stoned Love"	The Supremes
5.	"Got to Be There"	Michael Jackson
6.	"Just My Imagination (Running Away With Me)"	The Temptations
7.	"Your Kiss Is Sweet"	Syreeta
8.	"The Tears of a Clown"	Smokey Robinson & The Miracles
9.	"Machine Gun"	Commodores

== Charts ==
=== Motown Gold ===
Chart (1975–76)	Peak position
UK Albums (OCC)	8

=== Motown Gold Vol. 2 ===
Chart (1977–78)	Peak position
UK Albums (OCC)	28

== Certifications ==
=== Motown Gold ===
Region	Certification	Certified units/sales
United Kingdom (BPI)	Platinum	300,000^{^}
^{^} Shipments figures based on certification alone.

=== Motown Gold Vol. 2 ===
Region	Certification	Certified units/sales
United Kingdom (BPI)	Silver	60,000^{^}
^{^} Shipments figures based on certification alone.
