= Rustix =

American R&B/blue-eyed soul ensemble

- Also known as: The Rustix
- Origin: Rochester, New York, United States
- Genres: R&B; blue-eyed soul
- Years active: 1966–1972, 2016
- Label: Rare Earth
- Past members: Chuck Brucato; Ron Collins; David Colon; Bob D'Andrea; Vinnie Strenk; Al Galich

Rustix (or The Rustix) were an American R&B/blue-eyed soul ensemble from Rochester, New York.

== Career ==
Rustix formed in 1967; the band was signed to Rare Earth Records, a Motown Records subsidiary. When they signed, they were the first all white act that did not use other musicians to back them (i.e. The Funk Brothers) to be signed to a Motown Label. When they were signed, Rare Earth hadn't yet been signed. The label didn't have a name yet.

Prior to signing with Rare Earth, the band had a single on the Cadet Records label.

Prior to their recording career, the group had been a popular attraction in upstate New York, opening for Jimi Hendrix and Soft Machine at one point. Among their singles were "Can't You Hear the Music Play" from the album Bedlam, released in 1969 and "Come On People" from the album of the same name, released in 1970. Bedlam peaked at No. 200 on the Billboard 200.

A sophomore effort, Come On People, followed in 1970; both of the group's first two records were produced by R. Dean Taylor. A third album was recorded in 1971 but never released, and the group disbanded later that year. At that point, Chuck Brucato and Al Galich recorded a pair of songs under the Rustix name ("We All End Up in Boxes" and "My Peace of Heaven") backed by the Funk Brothers. Both were released in 1971, and both backed by a Rustix outtake from their 2nd album sessions ("Down Down").

They were inducted into the Rochester Music Hall of Fame on April 24, 2016. The surviving band members regrouped for the occasion. They were joined on stage by members of the band Prime Time Funk & the son of Chuck, Joe Brucato.

== Members ==
- Chuck Brucato (deceased) – vocals
- Ron Collins (deceased) – bass
- David Colon – drums
- Bob D'Andrea (deceased) – guitar
- Vinnie Strenk – Hammond B3
- Al Galich (deceased) – lead vocals

== Discography ==
=== Albums ===
- Bedlam (Rare Earth Records, 1969) (No. 200 on the Billboard Top LPs).
- Come On People (Rare Earth, 1970)

=== Singles ===
- "Leaving Here" b/w "When I Get Home" (Cadet Records, 1968)
- "Can't You Hear the Music Play" b/w "I Guess This Is Goodbye" (Rare Earth, 1969)
- "I Heard It Through the Grapevine" b/w "I Guess This Is Goodbye" (Rare Earth, 1969) (non-U.S. single)
- "Come On People" b/w "Free Again (Non C'est Rien)" (Rare Earth, 1970)
- "We All End Up in Boxes" b/w "Down Down" (Rare Earth, 1971)
- "My Piece of Heaven" b/w "Down Down" (Rare Earth, 1971)
