= Fizzy Qwick =

American singer and songwriter (born 1953)

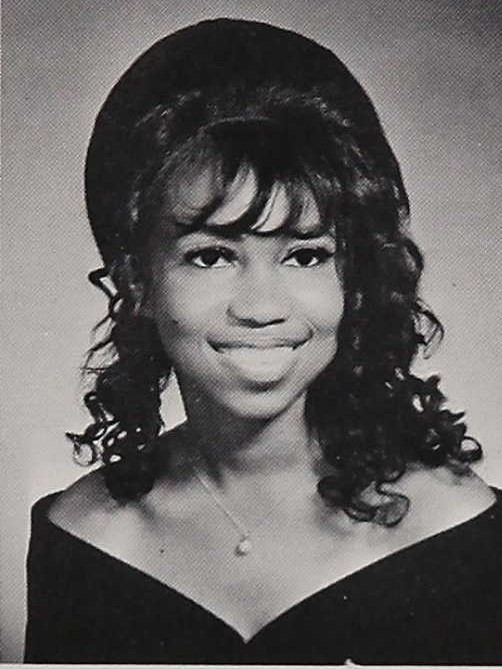
- Debravon Lewis senior class portrait at Encinal High School (Alameda, California), 1971

Background information
- Born: Debravon Lewis; February 9, 1953; Solano County, California, United States
- Died: December 1, 2022 (aged 69) Sacramento, California, United States
- Genres: R&B, new wave, pop, disco, jazz
- Occupation: Singer
- Instrument: Vocals
- Years active: 1970s–1980s, 2000s
- Labels: Motown, Bang/CBS, First Experience Records, Oakland Smoke

Fizzy Qwick (February 9, 1953-December 1, 2022) was an American singer and songwriter who has recorded in various musical styles ranging from R&B to new wave. Her recordings from the early 1980s have become popular among fans of Northern soul since the early 21st century.

== Biography ==
Born Debravon Lewis in Solano County, California, United States, the daughter of Edward Z. (October 27, 1925 – June 24, 1997) and Ethel (née Devine) Lewis, she grew up in the San Francisco Bay Area. In 1971, she graduated from Encinal High School in Alameda, California.

Lewis recorded under her own name either as a member of the R&B group Bridge or as a solo artist. Bridge evolved from an earlier group called Vitamin E, that was produced by Norman Connors. The new group was a septet that featured both teenager Derick Hughes and Lewis on vocals. Lewis also contributed to the group as a songwriter.

In the early 1980s she formed a new wave trio called Tiggi Clay, allegedly named after a notorious bully (who is portrayed in their initial music video). For this group she adopted the colorful stage name Fizzy Qwick. Her bandmates had the equally colorful names of William "Billy" Peaches (real name: Hilary Leon Thompson) and Romeo "Breath" McCall (real name: De Wayne Sweet). In 1983, Tiggi Clay signed with the newly formed Motown rock subsidiary, Morocco. The album jacket from their self-titled debut showed the trio only in silhouette, presumably to create a mystique and/or conceal their racial identity. A similar technique was used with other label artists such as white soul singer Teena Marie and Berry Gordy's son Rockwell on their initial releases. In fact, Rockwell's smash hit, "Somebody's Watching Me" was peaking on the charts at the same time as Tiggi Clay's initial single, "Flashes" entered Billboard's Hot 100 chart. Unfortunately, despite positive reviews from trade publications including Billboard, their album was not commercially successful.

Two years later, with the Morocco label already shut down, Fizzy Qwick released a self-titled solo album on the parent label. It was co-produced by Tiggi Clay bandmates Peaches and McCall in association with Gregg Crockett. "Hangin' Out", the initial single from the album (written by McCall) was a significant departure from the Tiggi Clay album. It had more of a pop feel, somewhat reminiscent of 1960's girl groups. Billboard said the song had "a lot of the spirit of the Supremes' greatest." The music publication selected it as a "Pick of Week", and went on to describe it as "a class debut for the solo chanteuse." Unfortunately, "Hangin' Out" was unable to rise above the lower third of the R&B charts. The extremely rare non-album B-side was the jazz-flavored "Angels in the Snow." The follow-up single, "You Want It Your Way, Always" (co-written by Lester Abrams, perhaps best known for the Doobie Brothers hit, "Minute by Minute") had a grittier sound reminiscent of Tina Turner. The latter song was also highlighted by a guitar solo by Joe Satriani. However, it received only regional airplay and failed to make the national charts.

In 2000, the UK-based label First Experience Records, released Crying for Love, a CD of demo recordings of the R&B septet Bridge. These were the recordings that landed Bridge a deal at the CBS subsidiary Bang twenty years earlier. Despite the unfinished quality of some of the tracks, this release has become a favorite of fans of Northern soul. Although the proposed album at Bang was never completed, at least two of the demo tracks were recorded by other artists prior to the CD's release. The song "Next to Me" was covered by drummer Kenneth Nash on his 1986 album, Mr. Ears. Jean Carne and Glenn Jones recorded "Sweet and Wonderful" on Carne's 1981 album of the same name. The latter track was co-written by Fizzy Qwick under her birth name, Debravon Lewis.

Most recently, she had written for female vocalist U.Niq.

== Selected discography ==
=== Singles ===
==== As Debravon Lewis ====
- 1981: "The Little Things (That Keep Me Loving You)" b/w "I'm Not That Kind of Girl" (Oakland Smoke 003)

==== Tiggi Clay (lead vocalist) ====
- 1984: "Flashes" b/w "Roses for Lydia" (#86 U.S. Pop, Morocco 1716)
- 1984: "The Winner Gets the Heart" b/w "Who Shot Zorro?" (Morocco 1728)

==== As Fizzy Qwick ====
- 1986: "Hangin' Out" b/w "Angels in the Snow" (#71 U.S. R&B, Motown 1838)
- 1986: "You Want It Your Way, Always" b/w "Young, Single and Tough" (Motown)

=== Albums ===
==== Tiggi Clay ====
- 1984: Tiggi Clay (Morocco 6067CL)

==== Fizzy Qwick ====
- 1986: Fizzy Qwick (Motown 6179ML)

==== Bridge ====
- 2000: Crying for Love (First Experience Records)

== Selected songwriting credits ==
Song	Co-Writer(s)	Performer(s)
"Flashes"	De Wayne Sweet (as Romeo "Breath" McCall); Hilary Leon Thompson (as William "Billy" Peaches)	Tiggi Clay
"It's The Little Things (That Keep Me Loving You)"	Walter Richardson; Harvey Scales	Debravon Lewis
"Sweet and Wonderful"	Derick Hughes; Michael Robinson	Jean Carne featuring Glenn Jones; Bridge
"You Can't Bring Me Down"	Laing Lew	U.Niq
"Young, Single and Tough"	De Wayne Sweet (as Romeo "Breath" McCall); Hilary Leon Thompson (as W. Billy Peaches)	Fizzy Qwick
