= My Guy =

1964 single by Mary Wells

- Side A of the Australian single

Single by Mary Wells

from the album Mary Wells Sings My Guy
- B-side: "Oh Little Boy (What Did You Do to Me)"
- Released: March 13, 1964
- Recorded: 1964
- Studio: Hitsville U.S.A. (Studio A), Detroit, Michigan
- Genre: R&B
- Length: 2:54
- Label: Motown
- Songwriter: Smokey Robinson
- Producer: Smokey Robinson

Mary Wells singles chronology
"What's Easy For Two Is So Hard For One" (1963)	"My Guy" (1964)	"Once Upon a Time" (1964)

"My Guy" is a 1964 hit single by American singer Mary Wells for the Motown label. It was written and produced by Smokey Robinson of The Miracles.

== Mary Wells version ==
At the session for the "My Guy" backing track, the studio musicians were having issues completing the intro. They had been playing all day and only a half-hour scheduled studio time was left. Trombonist George Bohanon said to keyboardist Earl Van Dyke that the opening measure of "Canadian Sunset" could be perfectly juxtaposed on the intro's chord changes, and Van Dyke, the session bandleader, expediently constructed an intro incorporating the opening of "Canadian Sunset" and also the "left hand notes" from "Canadian Sunset" composer Eddie Heywood's rendition of "Begin the Beguine". Van Dyke would recall: "We were doing anything to get the hell out of that studio. We knew that the producers didn't know nothing 'bout no 'Canadian Sunset' or 'Begin the Beguine'. We figured the song would wind up in the trash can anyway".

When Wells recorded her vocal she sang over the song's outro with a huskiness evoking the line delivery of Mae West: Wells would recall: "I was only joking but the producers said 'Keep it going, keep it going'."

Cash Box described it as "a tantalizing shuffle-twist hand-clapper that the lark and her combo-choral support serve up in most attractive fashion."

"My Guy" became the biggest hit ever for Wells, Motown's first female star, and reached the top of the Billboard Hot 100 pop singles chart on 16 May 1964. The song led the Cashbox magazine R&B chart for seven weeks. "My Guy" was also Wells' last hit single for Motown, except for duets she recorded with label mate Marvin Gaye. An option in her recording contract let Wells terminate the contract at her discretion after she reached her twenty-first birthday on May 13, 1964. Encouraged by her ex-husband, Wells broke her Motown contract and signed with 20th Century Fox in hopes of higher royalties and possible movie roles. However, Wells' career never again reached the heights it had at Motown, and she never again had a hit single as big as "My Guy".

Her version of the song was used in the film More American Graffiti (1979) and in a season one episode of Friends ("The One with Mrs. Bing").

In the United Kingdom, "My Guy" peaked at No.5 in June 1964.

In 1999, the 1964 recording of "My Guy" by Mary Wells on Motown Records was inducted into the Grammy Hall of Fame.

== Personnel ==
- Lead vocals by Mary Wells
- Background vocals by the Andantes: Jackie Hicks, Marlene Barrow, and Louvain Demps
- Written and produced by William "Smokey" Robinson
- Instrumentation by the Funk Brothers:
  - Earl Van Dyke – keyboards
  - Johnny Griffith – piano
  - Eddie Willis – guitar
  - Robert White – guitar
  - James Jamerson – bass
  - Benny Benjamin – drums
  - Dave Hamilton – vibes
  - Herbert Williams – trumpet
  - John Wilson – trumpet
  - Paul Riser – trombone
  - George Bohanon – trombone

== Charts ==
=== Weekly charts ===
Weekly chart performance for "My Guy"
Chart (1964)	Peak position
Australia	3
Canada (CHUM Hit Parade)	7
Ireland (IRMA)	9
New Zealand (Lever Hit Parade)	1
UK	5
US Billboard Hot 100	1
US Cash Box R&B	1
US Cash Box Top 100	1

1972 weekly chart performance for "My Guy"
Chart (1972)	Peak position
UK	14

=== Year-end charts ===
1964 year-end chart performance for "My Guy"
Chart (1964)	Rank
US Billboard Hot 100	7
US Cash Box Top 100	7

== Certifications ==
Certifications for "My Guy"
Region	Certification	Certified units/sales
New Zealand (RMNZ)	Gold	15,000^{‡}
United Kingdom (BPI)	Gold	400,000^{‡}
^{‡} Sales+streaming figures based on certification alone.

== Petula Clark versions ==
"My Guy"

Single by Petula Clark

from the album Now
- B-side: "Little Bit of Lovin'"
- Released: May 1972
- Recorded: 1972
- Genre: Easy listening
- Length: 3:12
- Label: MGM
- Songwriter: Smokey Robinson
- Producers: Mike Curb, Don Costa

Petula Clark singles chronology
"I Don't Know How to Love Him" (1971)	"My Guy" (1972)	"Wedding Song (There Is Love)" (1972)

"My Guy" was recorded by Petula Clark and featured on her 1971 album Now. It peaked at No.70, crossing over from the Easy Listening chart where it reached No.12.

== Sister Sledge version ==
"My Guy"

Single by Sister Sledge

from the album The Sisters
- B-side: "Il Macquillage Lady"
- Released: January 1982
- Recorded: 1981
- Genre: Soul
- Length: 3:45
- Label: Cotillion
- Songwriter: Smokey Robinson
- Producer: Sister Sledge

Sister Sledge singles chronology
"He's Just a Runaway" (1981)	"My Guy" (1982)	"All the Man I Need" (1982)

Sister Sledge remade "My Guy" for their 1982 self-produced album The Sisters. Kathy Sledge, the group's usual lead singer, would recall - "I had very little input [into the album], but I did push for 'My Guy'." Issued as the album's lead single, "My Guy" afforded Sister Sledge their third Top 40 hit although with a number 23 peak. "My Guy" also afforded Sister Sledge a fifth and final Top 20 R&B hit on the R&B chart, peaking at number 14. The Sister Sledge version of "My Guy" had its strongest impact on the Easy Listening chart where it rose as high as number 2.

Sister Sledge performed "My Guy" on the episode of the CBS-TV sitcom The Jeffersons entitled "My Guy, George", taped 17 January 1984 and broadcast 4 March 1984. In the guise of struggling musical act the Satin Sisters, Sister Sledge wooed George Jefferson to act as their manager by singing him an a cappella rendition of "My Guy" with the lyrics modified to flatter Jefferson.

== Other versions ==
In 1980, Amii Stewart and Johnny Bristol recorded a medley of "My Guy" and another Motown classic, the Temptations' "My Girl": "My Guy - My Girl (Medley)" peaked at No.63 in the U.S., No.76 R&B, and No.39 in the UK. The track was reissued in 1985 with Bristol's vocal being replaced by Deon Estus: this version reached No.63 in the UK.

"My Guy" has twice reached the C&W chart in renderings by Lynda K Lance (No.46 C&W, 1971) and by Margo Smith (No.43 C&W, 1980).

The song has also been recorded by Lucia Altieri (it) (rendered in Italian as "Non ti scuso piu"), Aretha Franklin, Nancy Holloway (fr) (rendered in French as "Bye Bye"), Claudine Longet, Barbara McNair, Melba Moore, Dara Sedaka, and Helen Shapiro. Mary Wells herself re-recorded the song in a funk rendition for her 1984 album, I'm a Lady.

More than via any straightforward remake, "My Guy" has had its highest profile since the Mary Wells original through its appearance on the soundtrack of the film Sister Act (1992), starring Whoopi Goldberg, in a rendition that substitutes "My Guy" with "My God", transforming the song into a gospel number.

In 2008, the Los Angeles–based rock group Warpaint performed a version of the song on their EP Exquisite Corpse, titled "Billie Holiday".
