= Motown =

American record label

- Parent company: Universal Music Group (UMG)
- Founded: January 12, 1959; 67 years ago
- Founder: Berry Gordy
- Distributors: Republic (US); Motown UK/EMI (UK); UMe (reissues)
- Genre: Various
- Country of origin: United States
- Location: Detroit, Michigan, U.S.
- Official website: motownrecords.com

Motown is an American record label owned by Universal Music Group. Founded by American record executive Berry Gordy Jr., as Tamla Records on January 12, 1959, it was incorporated as Motown Record Corporation on April 14, 1960. Its name, a portmanteau of motor and town, has become a nickname for Detroit, the center of the automotive industry in the United States, where Motown was originally headquartered.

Motown played a vital role in the racial integration of popular music as an African American-owned label that achieved crossover success with white audiences. In the 1960s, Motown and its main subsidiary labels (including Gordy, Soul) were the most prominent exponents of what became known as the Motown sound, a style of soul music with a mainstream pop-influenced sound and appeal. Motown was the most successful soul music label, with a net worth of $61 million in 1988. Between 1960 and 1969, 79 Motown songs reached the top ten of the Billboard Hot 100, and 21 went to no.1 on the Billboard Hot 100.

In March 1965, Berry Gordy and Dave Godin agreed to license the Tamla Motown label name for future UK releases through EMI Records. Shortly after, as Berry Gordy owned the brand name, Tamla Motown also became the primary name used outside the US for non-EMI licensees. In 1997, EMI bought 50% of the rights to Motown back catalogue for re-releases in Europe, sharing ownership with Polygram (Now Universal Music). In 2013 with the sale of EMI Group to Universal Music, the label acquired the majority of the remaining rights to Motown old catalogue in Europe. Warner Music, which purchased the former EMI Records, still has a minimal share of the rights to Motown old catalogue, mainly in the UK.

Following the 1967 Detroit riot, and the loss of key songwriting/production team Holland–Dozier–Holland that year over royalty disputes, Gordy moved Motown to Los Angeles, California, and it expanded into film and television production. It was an independent company until MCA Records bought it in 1988. PolyGram purchased the label from MCA in 1993, followed by MCA successor Universal Music Group, which acquired PolyGram in 1999.

Motown spent much of the 2000s headquartered in New York City as a part of the UMG subsidiaries Universal Motown and Universal Motown Republic Group. From 2011 to 2014, it was a part of the Island Def Jam Music Group division of Universal Music. In 2014, however, UMG announced the dissolution of Island Def Jam, and Motown relocated back to Los Angeles to operate under the Capitol Music Group, now operating out of the Capitol Tower. In 2018, Motown was inducted into Rhythm and Blues Music Hall of Fame in a ceremony held at the Charles H. Wright Museum.

In 2021, Motown separated from the Capitol Music Group to become a standalone label once again. On November 29, 2022, Ethiopia Habtemariam announced that she would be stepping down as chairwoman/CEO of Motown. As of 2023, acts signed to Motown include City Girls, Migos, Lil Baby, Lil Yachty, Smino, Vince Staples, YoungBoy Never Broke Again, and several other artists in the hip-hop and R&B genres.

== History ==
=== Beginnings of Motown ===
Berry Gordy's interest in the record business began when he opened a record store called the 3D Record Mart, a shop where he hoped to "educate customers about the beauty of jazz", in Detroit, Michigan. Although the shop did not last very long, Gordy's interest in the music business did not fade. He frequented Detroit's downtown nightclubs, and in the Flame Show Bar he met bar manager Al Green (not the soul singer of the same name), who owned a music publishing company called Pearl Music and represented Detroit-based musician Jackie Wilson. Gordy soon became part of a group of songwriters—with his sister Gwen Gordy and Billy Davis—who wrote songs for Wilson. In August 1957, "Reet Petite" was released and became their first major hit. During the next eighteen months, Gordy helped to write six more Wilson A-sides, including "Lonely Teardrops", a peak-popular hit of 1958. Between 1957 and 1958, Gordy wrote or produced over a hundred sides for various artists, with his siblings Anna, Gwen and Robert, and other collaborators in varying combinations.

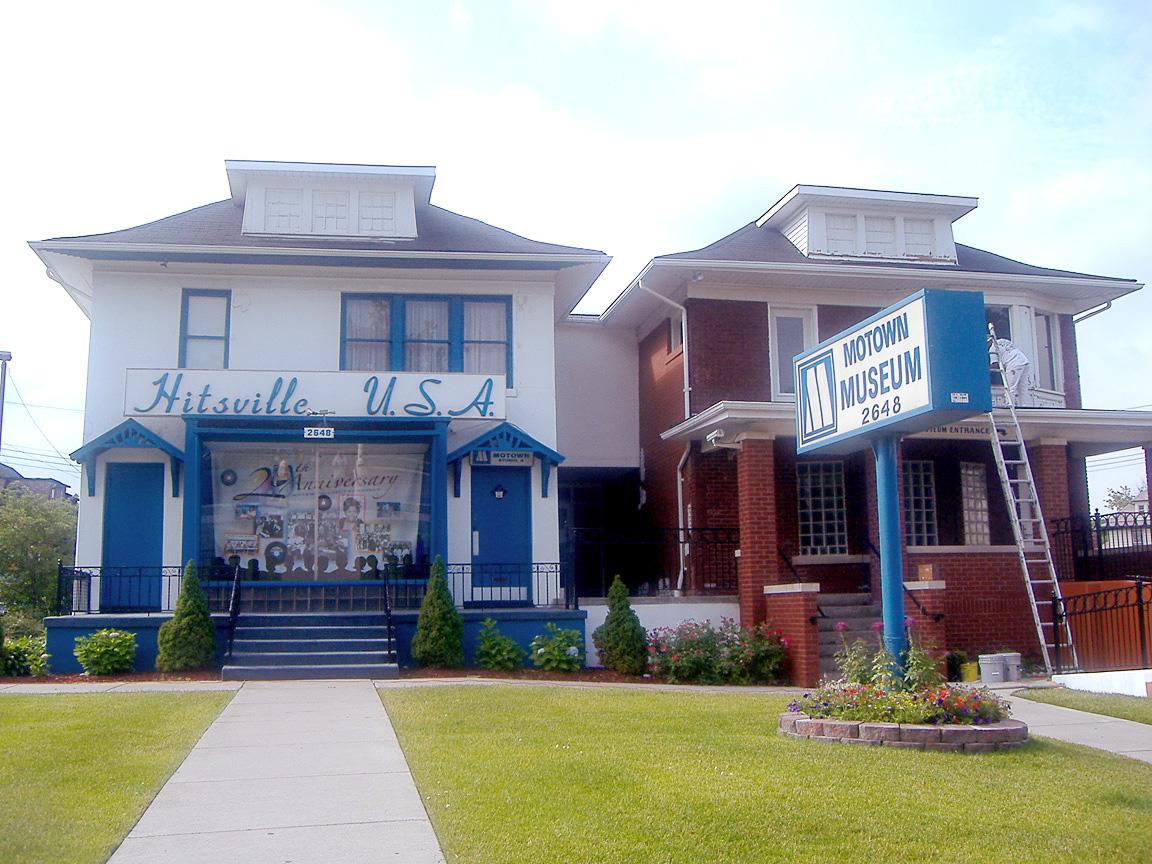
The Hitsville U.S.A. Motown building, at 2648 West Grand Boulevard in Detroit, Motown's headquarters from 1959 to 1968, which became the Motown Historical Museum in 1985

In 1957, Gordy met Smokey Robinson, a local seventeen-year-old singer fronting a vocal harmony group called the Matadors. Gordy was interested in the doo-wop style that Robinson sang. In 1958, Gordy recorded the group's song "Got a Job" (an answer song to "Get a Job" by the Silhouettes), and released it as a single by leasing the record to a larger company outside Detroit called End Records, based in New York. The practice was common at the time for a small-time producer. "Got a Job" was the first single by Robinson's group, now called the Miracles. Gordy recorded a number of other records by forging a similar arrangement, most significantly with United Artists.

In 1958, Gordy wrote and produced "Come to Me" for Marv Johnson, recording the song at Detroit's United Sound Systems. Seeing that the song had great crossover potential, Gordy leased it to United Artists for national distribution but also released it locally on his own startup imprint. Needing $800 to cover his end of the deal, Gordy asked his family to borrow money from a cooperative family savings account. After some debate, his family agreed, and in January 1959 "Come to Me" was released regionally on Gordy's new Tamla label. Gordy originally wanted to name the label Tammy Records, after the hit song popularized by Debbie Reynolds from the 1957 film Tammy and the Bachelor, in which Reynolds also starred. When he found the name was already in use, Berry decided on Tamla instead. In April 1959, Gordy and his sister Gwen founded Anna Records which released about two dozen singles between 1959 and 1960. The most popular was Barrett Strong's "Money (That's What I Want)", written by Gordy and a secretary named Janie Bradford, and produced by Gordy. Many of the songs distributed locally by Anna and Tamla Records were nationally distributed by Chess Records (sometimes with Anna and Tamla imprints). Gordy's relationship with Chess fostered closer dealings with Harvey Fuqua, nephew of Charlie Fuqua of the Ink Spots. Harvey Fuqua later married Gwen Gordy in 1961.

Gordy looked toward creative self-sufficiency and established the publishing firm Jobete in June 1959 (incorporated in Michigan). He applied for copyrights on more than seventy songs before the end of 1959, including material used for the Miracles and Frances Burnett records, which were leased to Chess and Coral Records. The Michigan Chronicle of Detroit called Gordy an "independent producer of records", as his contributions to the city were beginning to attract notice. By that time, he was the president of Jobete, Tamla, and the music writing company Rayber.

Gordy worked in various Detroit-based studios during this period to produce recordings and demos, but most prominently with United Sound Systems which was considered the best studio in town. However, producing at United Sound Systems was financially taxing and not appropriate for every job, so Gordy decided it would be more cost effective to maintain his own facility. In mid-1959, he purchased a photography studio at 2648 West Grand Boulevard and converted the main floor into a recording studio and office space. Now, rather than shopping his songs to other artists or leasing his recordings to outside companies, Gordy began using the Tamla and Motown imprints to release songs that he wrote and produced. He incorporated Motown Records in April 1960.

Smokey Robinson became the vice president of the company (and later named his daughter "Tamla" and his son "Berry"). Several of Gordy's family members, including his father Berry Sr., brothers Robert and George, and sister Esther, were given key roles in the company. By the middle of the decade, Gwen and Anna Gordy had joined the label in administrative positions as well. Gordy's partner at the time (and wife from 1960 to 1964), Raynoma Liles, also played a key role in the early days of Motown, leading the company's first session group, The Rayber Voices, and overseeing Jobete.

=== West Grand Boulevard ===
The studio that Gordy purchased in 1959 would become Motown's Hitsville U.S.A. studio. The photography studio located in the back of the property was modified into a small recording studio, and the Gordys moved into the second-floor living quarters. Within seven years, Motown would occupy seven additional neighboring houses:

- Hitsville U.S.A., 1959 – (ground floor) administrative office, tape library, control room, Studio A; (upper floor) Gordy living quarters (1959–62), artists and repertoire (1962–72)
- Jobete Music Company, Inc., 1961 – sales, billing, collections, shipping, and public relations
- Berry Gordy Jr. Enterprise, 1962 – offices for Berry Gordy Jr. and Esther Gordy Edwards
- Finance department, 1965 – royalties and payroll
- Artist personal development, 1966 – Harvey Fuqua (head of artist development and producer of stage performances), Maxine Powell (instructor in grooming, poise, and social graces for Motown artists), Maurice King (vocal coach, musical director and arranger), Cholly Atkins (house choreography), and rehearsal studios
- Two houses for administrative offices, 1966 – sales and marketing, traveling and traffic, and mixing and mastering
- ITMI (International Talent Management Inc.) office, 1966 – management

Motown had hired over 450 employees and had a gross income of $20 million by the end of 1966.

=== Detroit: 1959–1972 ===
Early Tamla/Motown artists included Mable John, Eddie Holland and Mary Wells. "Shop Around", the Miracles' first number 1 R&B hit, peaked at number two on the Billboard Hot 100 in 1960. It was Tamla's first million-selling record. On April 14, 1960, Motown and Tamla Records merged into a new company called Motown Record Corporation. A year later, the Marvelettes scored Tamla's first US number-one hit, "Please Mr. Postman". By the mid-1960s, the company, with the help of songwriters and producers such as Robinson, A&R chief William "Mickey" Stevenson, Brian Holland, Lamont Dozier, and Norman Whitfield, had become a major force in the music industry.

From 1961 to 1971, Motown had 110 top 10 hits. Top artists on the Motown label during that period included the Supremes (initially including Diana Ross), the Four Tops, and the Jackson 5, while Stevie Wonder, Marvin Gaye, the Marvelettes, and the Miracles had hits on the Tamla label. The company operated several labels in addition to the Tamla and Motown imprints. A third label, which Gordy named after himself (though it was originally called "Miracle") featured the Temptations, the Contours, Edwin Starr, and Martha and the Vandellas. A fourth, V.I.P., released recordings by the Velvelettes, the Spinners, the Monitors, and Chris Clark.

A fifth label, Soul, featured Jr. Walker & the All Stars, Jimmy Ruffin, Shorty Long, the Originals, and Gladys Knight & the Pips (who had found success before joining Motown, as "The Pips" on Vee-Jay). Many more Motown-owned labels released recordings in other genres, including Workshop Jazz (jazz) Earl Washington Reflections and Earl Washington's All Stars, Mel-o-dy (country, although it was originally an R&B label), and Rare Earth, whose acts, including the eponymous band, explored blues-oriented and progressive rock styles. Under the slogan "The Sound of Young America", Motown's acts were enjoying widespread popularity among black and white audiences alike.

Smokey Robinson said of Motown's cultural impact:

Into the 1960s, I was still not of a frame of mind that we were not only making music, we were making history. But I did recognize the impact because acts were going all over the world at that time. I recognized the bridges that we crossed, the racial problems and the barriers that we broke down with music. I recognized that because I lived it. I would come to the South in the early days of Motown and the audiences would be segregated. Then they started to get the Motown music and we would go back and the audiences were integrated and the kids were dancing together and holding hands.

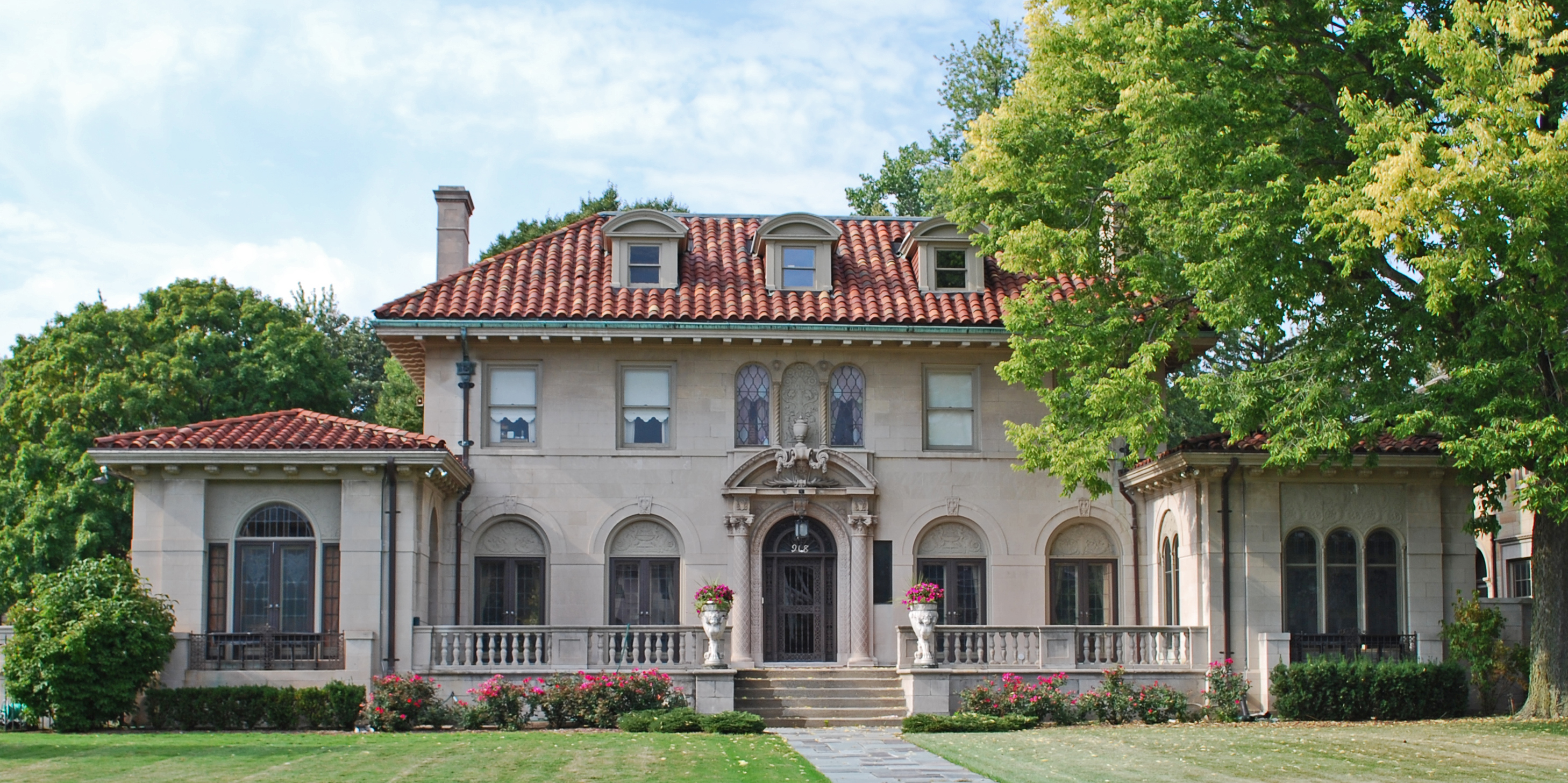
Berry Gordy's House, known as Motown Mansion in Detroit's Boston-Edison Historic District

In 1967, Berry Gordy purchased what is now known as Motown Mansion in Detroit's Boston-Edison Historic District as his home, leaving his previous home to his sister Anna and her then-husband Marvin Gaye (where photos for the cover of his album What's Going On were taken). In 1968, Gordy purchased the Donovan building on the corner of Woodward Avenue and Interstate 75, and moved Motown's Detroit offices there (the Donovan building was demolished in January 2006 to provide parking spaces for Super Bowl XL). In the same year, Gordy purchased Golden World Records, and its recording studio became "Studio B" to Hitsville's "Studio A".

In the United Kingdom, Motown's records were released on various labels: at first London (only the Miracles' "Shop Around"/"Who's Lovin' You" and "Ain't It Baby"), then Fontana ("Please Mr. Postman" by the Marvelettes was one of four) and then Oriole American ("Fingertips" by Little Stevie Wonder was one of many). In 1963, Motown signed with EMI's Stateside label ("Where Did Our Love Go" by the Supremes and "My Guy" by Mary Wells were Motown's first British top-20 hits). Eventually, EMI created the Tamla Motown label ("Stop! In the Name of Love" by the Supremes was the first Tamla Motown release in March 1965).

The label's distinctive 'M' logo was designed by Bernie Yeszin, who after being hired by Gordy as Motown's art director in 1962, developed its visual style and created many of its "sophisticated" album covers. He left the company in 1968.

=== Los Angeles: 1972–1998 ===
After the songwriting trio Holland–Dozier–Holland left the label in 1967 over royalty-payment disputes, Norman Whitfield became the company's top producer, turning out hits for the Temptations, Marvin Gaye, Gladys Knight & the Pips and Rare Earth. In the meantime Berry Gordy established Motown Productions, a television subsidiary which produced TV specials for the Motown artists, including TCB, with Diana Ross & the Supremes and the Temptations, Diana! with Diana Ross, and Goin' Back to Indiana with the Jackson 5. The company loosened its production rules, allowing some of its longtime artists the opportunity to write and produce more of their own material. This resulted in the recordings of successful and critically acclaimed albums such as Marvin Gaye's What's Going On (1971) and Let's Get it On (1973), and Stevie Wonder's Music of My Mind (1972), Talking Book (1972), and Innervisions (1973).

Motown had established branch offices in both New York City and Los Angeles during the mid-1960s, and by 1969 had begun gradually moving more of its operations to Los Angeles. On June 14, 1972, the company announced it was moving all of its operations to Los Angeles. A number of artists moved with the label, among them Martha Reeves, the Four Tops, Gladys Knight & the Pips and many of the Funk Brothers studio band, while others stayed behind in Detroit or left the company for other reasons. By re-locating, Motown aimed chiefly to branch out into the motion-picture industry, and Motown Productions got its start in film by turning out two vehicles for Diana Ross: the hit Billie Holiday biographical film Lady Sings the Blues (1972), and Mahogany (1975). Other Motown films would include Scott Joplin (1977), Thank God It's Friday (1978), The Wiz (1978) and The Last Dragon (1985). Ewart Abner, who had been associated with Motown since the 1960s, became its president in 1973.

John McClain, an A&M Records executive, opined that Motown leaving its birth city marked a decline in the label's quality. "Something happened when [Motown] left Detroit and came to [Los Angeles]," he said. "They quit being innovators and started following trends. Before, Berry had a much more hands-on approach. And maybe you lose some of your desire after you get to a certain level financially."

By the 1970s, the Motown "hit factory" had become a target of a backlash from some fans of rock music. Record producer Pete Waterman recalls of this period: "I was a DJ for years and I worked for Motown – the press at the time, papers like NME, used to call it Toytown. When I DJ'd on the Poly circuit, the students wanted me to play Spooky Tooth and Velvet Underground. Things don't change. Nowadays, of course, Motown is hip."

Despite losing Holland–Dozier–Holland, Norman Whitfield, and some of its other hitmakers by 1975, Motown still had a number of successful artists during the 1970s and 1980s, including Lionel Richie and the Commodores, Rick James, Teena Marie, the Dazz Band, Jose Feliciano and DeBarge. By the mid-1980s, Motown had started losing money, and Berry Gordy sold his ownership in Motown to MCA Records (which began a North American distribution deal with the label in 1983) and Boston Ventures in June 1988 for $61 million. In 1989, Gordy sold the Motown Productions TV/film operations to Motown executive Suzanne de Passe, who renamed the company de Passe Entertainment and continues to run it as of 2018. Gordy continued to retain the Jobete music publishing catalog, selling it separately to EMI Music Publishing in parts between 1997 and 2004. It is currently owned by Sony Music Publishing (Sony/ATV until 2021) through the acquisition of EMI Music Publishing in 2012 (as a leader of the consortium and eventually assigned full ownership in 2018).

During the 1990s, Motown was home to successful recording artists such as Boyz II Men and Johnny Gill, although the company itself remained in a state of turmoil. MCA appointed a series of executives to run the company, beginning with Berry Gordy's immediate successor, Jheryl Busby. Busby quarreled with MCA, alleging that the company did not give Motown's product adequate attention or promotion. In 1991, Motown sued MCA to have its distribution deal with the company terminated, and began releasing its product through PolyGram. PolyGram purchased Motown from Boston Ventures three years later.

In 1994, Busby was replaced by Andre Harrell, the entrepreneur behind Uptown Records. Harrell served as Motown's CEO for just under two years, leaving the company after receiving bad publicity for being inefficient. Danny Goldberg, who ran PolyGram's Mercury Records group, assumed control of Motown, and George Jackson served as president.

=== Final years of the Motown label: 1999–2005 ===
By 1998, Motown had added stars such as 702, Brian McKnight, and Erykah Badu to its roster. In December 1998, PolyGram was acquired by Seagram, and Motown was absorbed into the Universal Music Group. Seagram had purchased Motown's former parent MCA in 1995, and Motown was in effect reunited with many of its MCA corporate siblings (Seagram had hoped to build a media empire around Universal, and started by purchasing PolyGram). Universal briefly considered shuttering the label, but instead decided to restructure it. Kedar Massenburg, a producer for Erykah Badu, became the head of the label, and oversaw successful recordings from Badu, McKnight, Michael McDonald, and new Motown artist India.Arie.

Diana Ross, Smokey Robinson, Stevie Wonder, and the Temptations had remained with the label since its early days, although all except Wonder recorded for other labels for several years. Ross left Motown for RCA Records from 1981 to 1988, but returned in 1989 and stayed until 2002, while Robinson left Motown in 1991 (although he did return to release one more album for the label in 1999). The Temptations left for Atlantic Records in 1977, but returned in 1980 and eventually left again in 2004. Wonder finally left the label in 2020.

=== Universal Motown: 2005–2011 ===
In 2005, Massenburg was replaced by Sylvia Rhone, former CEO of Elektra Records. Motown was merged with Universal Records to create the Universal Motown Records and placed under the newly created umbrella division of Universal Motown Republic Group. Notable artists on Universal Motown included Drake Bell, Ryan Leslie, Melanie Fiona, Kelly Rowland, Forever the Sickest Kids, The Veer Union and Four Year Strong. Motown celebrated its 50th anniversary on January 12, 2009, and celebrated it in Detroit on November 20, 2009, in a black-tie Gala titled "Live It Again!" The event was hosted by Sinbad and included Stevie Wonder, Smokey Robinson, the Temptations, Aretha Franklin and Kid Rock.

=== Relaunch: 2011– ===
In mid-2011, Universal Motown reverted to the Motown brand after having been separated from Universal Motown Republic Group, hired Ethiopia Habtemariam as its Senior Vice President, and operated under The Island Def Jam Music Group. Artists from Universal Motown were transferred to the newly revitalized Motown label. On January 25, 2012, it was announced that Ne-Yo would join the Motown label both as an artist as well as the new Senior Vice President of A&R. On April 1, 2014, it was announced that Island Def Jam would no longer be running following the resignation of CEO Barry Weiss. A press release sent out by Universal Music Group announced that the label would now be reorganizing Def Jam Recordings, Island Records and Motown Records all as separate entities. Motown would then begin serving as a subsidiary of Capitol Records. In late 2018, Motown began celebrating its 60th anniversary by reissuing numerous albums from its catalog.

Motown UK launched in September 2020 under Universal UK's EMI Records (formerly Virgin EMI Records) division. Motown Records became part of UMG's Republic Corps in 2024.

== Roster ==
=== Current ===
| Artists | Year signed | Releases (under the label) | Notes |
|---|---|---|---|
| Erykah Badu | 2000 | 6 | |
| Kem | 2003 | 6 | |
| Ne-Yo | 2012 | 5 | Jointly with Compound |
| Sam Hunt | 2008 | 5 | Jointly with Compound |
| Lil Yachty | 2016 | 8 | Jointly with Quality Control Music and Capitol Records |
| Offset | 2017 | 2 | Jointly with YRN The Label (formerly with Quality Control Music and Capitol Records) |
| Quavo | 2017 | 3 | Jointly with YRN The Label, Quality Control Music (formerly with Capitol Records) |
| Takeoff | 2017 | 2 | Jointly with YRN The Label, Quality Control Music (formerly with Capitol Records) |
| Migos | 2017 | 2 | Jointly with YRN The Label, Quality Control Music (formerly with Capitol Records) |
| City Girls | 2018 | 2 | Jointly with Quality Control Music and Capitol Records |
| Chuck Wicks | 2008 | 5 | Jointly with Compound |
| Lil Baby | 2023 | 4 | |
| Bree Runway | 2019 | 1 | Jointly with Motown UK and EMI |
| Layton Greene | 2019 | 1 | Jointly with Quality Control |
| Emanuel | 2020 | 1 | Jointly with Universal Music Canada |
| Joy Denalane | 2020 | 1 | |
| TheHxliday | 2020 | 2 | |
| Ted When | 2020 | 2 | Jointly with Blacksmith Entertainment |
| Tiana Major9 | 2020 | 3 | Jointly with Zero Point Nine |
| Tiwa Savage | 2020 | 1 | Jointly with Universal Music South Africa |
| Bankroll Freddie | 2021 | 2 | Jointly with Quality Control |
| Duke Deuce | 2021 | 3 | Jointly with Quality Control |
| Vince Staples | 2021 | 2 | Jointly with Blacksmith |
| Hd4president | 2021 | 2s | Jointly with The Affiliate Nation |
| Malachiii | 2021 | 1 | Jointly with You'll Find Out |
| Meechy Baby | 2021 | 2 | Jointly with Never Broke Again |
| Brandy | 2022 | 1 (singles) | Jointly with Brand Nu |
| Diddy | 2022 | 2 (singles) | Jointly with Love Records |
| Lakeyah | 2022 | 2 | Jointly with Quality Control |
| Leon Thomas III | 2022 | 3 (singles) | Jointly with EZMNY Records |
| P Yungin | 2022 | 2 | Jointly with Never Broke Again |
| Smino | 2022 | 2 | Jointly with Zero Fatigue |
| YoungBoy Never Broke Again | 2023 | 3 | Jointly with Never Broke Again |
| NOBY | 2023 | 1 (singles) | |
| Rick Ross | 2025 | | Jointly with Maybach Music Group |

== Motown sound ==
Motown sound
- Stylistic origins: Pop; soul
- Cultural origins: 1960s, Detroit, Michigan, U.S.

Other topics
- Northern soul; rare groove

Motown specialized in a style of soul music known as the "Motown sound". Crafted with an ear towards pop appeal, the Motown sound typically featured tambourines to accent the back beat, prominent and often melodic electric bass guitar lines, distinctive melodic and chord structures, and a call-and-response singing style that originated in gospel music. In 1971, Jon Landau wrote in Rolling Stone that the sound consisted of songs with simple structures but sophisticated melodies, along with a four-beat drum pattern, regular use of horns and strings, and "a trebly style of mixing that relied heavily on electronic limiting and equalizing (boosting the high range frequencies) to give the overall product a distinctive sound, particularly effective for broadcast over AM radio". Pop production techniques such as the use of orchestral string sections, charted horn sections, and carefully arranged background vocals were also used. Complex arrangements and elaborate, melismatic vocal riffs were avoided. Motown producers believed steadfastly in the "KISS principle" (keep it simple, stupid).

The Motown production process has been described as factory-like. The Hitsville studios remained open and active 22 hours a day, and artists would often go on tour for weeks, come back to Detroit to record as many songs as possible, and then promptly go on tour again. Berry Gordy held quality control meetings every Friday morning, and used veto power to ensure that only the very best material and performances would be released. The test was that every new release needed to fit into a sequence of the top five selling pop singles of the week. Several tracks that later became critical and commercial favorites were initially rejected by Gordy, the two most notable being the Marvin Gaye songs "I Heard It Through the Grapevine" and "What's Going On". In several cases, producers would rework tracks in hopes of eventually getting them approved at a later Friday morning meeting, as producer Norman Whitfield did with "I Heard It Through the Grapevine" and the Temptations' "Ain't Too Proud to Beg".

Many of Motown's best-known songs, including all the early hits for the Supremes, were written by the songwriting trio of Holland–Dozier–Holland (Lamont Dozier and brothers Brian and Eddie Holland). Other important Motown producers and songwriters included Norman Whitfield, William "Mickey" Stevenson, Smokey Robinson, Barrett Strong, Nickolas Ashford & Valerie Simpson, Frank Wilson, Pamela Sawyer & Gloria Jones, James Dean & William Weatherspoon, Johnny Bristol, Harvey Fuqua, Gil Askey, Stevie Wonder, and Gordy himself.

The style created by the Motown musicians was a major influence on several non-Motown artists of the mid-1960s, such as Dusty Springfield and the Foundations. In the United Kingdom, the Motown sound became the basis of the northern soul movement. Smokey Robinson said the Motown sound had little to do with Detroit:

People would listen to it, and they'd say, 'Aha, they use more bass. Or they use more drums.' Bullshit. When we were first successful with it, people were coming from Germany, France, Italy, Mobile, Alabama. From New York, Chicago, California. From everywhere. Just to record in Detroit. They figured it was in the air, that if they came to Detroit and recorded on the freeway, they'd get the Motown sound. Listen, the Motown sound to me is not an audible sound. It's spiritual, and it comes from the people that make it happen. What other people didn't realize is that we just had one studio there, but we recorded in Chicago, Nashville, New York, L.A.—almost every big city. And we still got the sound.

=== The Funk Brothers ===
In addition to the songwriting process of the writers and producers, one of the major factors in the widespread appeal of Motown's music was Gordy's practice of using a highly-select and tight-knit group of studio musicians, collectively known as the Funk Brothers, to record the instrumental or "band" tracks of a majority of Motown recordings. Among the studio musicians responsible for the "Motown sound" were keyboardists Earl Van Dyke, Johnny Griffith, and Joe Hunter; guitarists Ray Monette, Joe Messina, Robert White, and Eddie Willis; percussionists Eddie "Bongo" Brown and Jack Ashford; drummers Benny Benjamin, Uriel Jones, and Richard "Pistol" Allen; and bassists James Jamerson and Bob Babbitt. The band's career and work is chronicled in the 2002 documentary film Standing in the Shadows of Motown, which publicised the fact that these musicians "played on more number-one records than The Beatles, Elvis, The Rolling Stones, and The Beach Boys combined". Ashford later played on Raphael Saadiq's 2008 album The Way I See It, whose recording and production were modelled after the Motown sound.

Much of the Motown sound came from the use of overdubbed and duplicated instrumentation. Motown songs regularly featured two drummers instead of one (either overdubbed or in unison), as well as three or four guitar lines. Bassist James Jamerson often played his instrument with only the index finger of his right hand, and created many of the basslines apparent on Motown songs such as "Up the Ladder to the Roof" by the Supremes.

== Artist development ==
Artist development was a major part of Motown's operations instituted by Berry Gordy. The acts on the Motown label were fastidiously groomed, dressed and choreographed for live performances. Motown artists were advised that their breakthrough into the white popular music market made them ambassadors for other African-American artists seeking broad market acceptance, and that they should think, act, walk and talk like royalty, so as to alter the less-than-dignified image commonly held of black musicians by white Americans in that era. Given that many of the talented young artists had been raised in housing projects and lacked the necessary social and dress experience, this Motown department was not only necessary, it created an elegant style of presentation long associated with the label. The artist development department specialized primarily in working with younger, less-experienced acts; experienced performers such as Jr. Walker and Marvin Gaye were exempt from artist-development classes.

Many of the young artists participated in an annual package tour called the "Motortown Revue", which was popular, first, on the "Chitlin' Circuit", and, later, around the world. The tours gave the younger artists a chance to hone their performance and social skills and learn from the more experienced artists.

== Motown subsidiary labels ==
In order to avoid accusations of payola should DJs play too many records from the original Tamla label, Gordy formed Motown Records as a second label in 1960. The two labels featured the same writers, producers and artists.

Many more subsidiary labels were established later under the umbrella of the Motown parent company, including Gordy Records, Soul Records and VIP Records; in reality the Motown Record Corporation controlled all of these labels. Most of the distinctions between Motown labels were largely arbitrary, with the same writers, producers and musicians working on all the major subsidiaries, and artists were often shuffled between labels for internal marketing reasons. All of these records are usually considered to be "Motown" records, regardless of whether they actually appeared on the Motown Records label itself or a subsidiary label.

=== Major divisions ===
- Tamla Records: Established 1959, Tamla was a primary subsidiary for mainstream R&B/soul music. Tamla is the company's original label: Gordy founded Tamla Records several months before establishing the Motown Record Corporation. The label's numbering system was combined with those of Motown and Gordy in 1982, and the label was merged with Motown in 1988. Notable Tamla artists included Smokey Robinson & the Miracles, Marvin Gaye, Stevie Wonder, the Marvelettes, and Eddie Kendricks. Tamla was briefly re-activated in 1996 as a reggae label, but only released a 12" single by Cocoa Tea called "New Immigration Law". Tamla also had a sub-label called Penny Records in 1959; artists on that label included Bryan Brent And The Cut Outs, who recorded a single for the label entitled "Vacation Time" b/w "For Eternity" (2201). In 2023, it was announced that Tamla would be re-activated again for the first time in nearly 30 years. This time around, it will be relaunched under Capitol Christian Music Group as an imprint devoted solely to positive R&B and hip hop. Tamla Records slogan: "The Sound that Makes the World Go 'Round".
- Motown Records: Established 1960, Motown was and remains the company's main label for mainstream R&B/soul music (and, today, hip-hop music as well). The label's numbering system was combined with those of Tamla and Gordy in 1982, and the label (and company) was purchased by MCA in 1988. Notable Motown artists have included Mary Wells, the Supremes, Four Tops, the Jackson 5, Michael Jackson, Jermaine Jackson, Boyz II Men, Commodores, Lionel Richie, Dazz Band, Brian McKnight, 98 Degrees, and Erykah Badu. Motown Records slogan: "The Sound of Young America".
- Gordy Records: Established 1962, Gordy was also a primary subsidiary for mainstream R&B/soul music. Originally known as Miracle Records (slogan: "If It's a Hit, It's a Miracle"), the name was changed in 1962 to avoid confusion with the Miracles singing group. The label's numbering system was combined with those of Motown and Tamla in 1982, and the label was merged with Motown in 1988. Notable Gordy artists included the Temptations, Martha and the Vandellas, the Contours, Edwin Starr, Rick James, The Mary Jane Girls, Teena Marie, Switch, and DeBarge. Gordy Records slogan: "It's What's in the Grooves that Counts".

One of Tamla Motown logos

- Tamla Motown Records: Motown's non-US label, established in March 1965 and folded into the regular Motown label in 1976. Distributed by EMI, Tamla Motown issued the releases on the American Motown labels, using its own numbering system. In some cases, Tamla Motown would issue singles and albums not released in the United States (for example, the singles "I Second That Emotion" and "Why (Must We Fall in Love)" by Diana Ross & the Supremes with the Temptations, as well as the successful Motown Chartbusters series of albums).
- Motown Gospel (formerly EMI Gospel)

=== Secondary R&B labels ===
- Check-Mate Records: Short-lived (1961–1962) R&B/soul subsidiary, purchased from Chess Records. Notable artists included David Ruffin and The Del-Phis (later Martha and the Vandellas).
- Miracle Records: Short-lived (1961) R&B/soul subsidiary that lasted less than a year. Some pressings featured the infamous tagline, "If it's a hit, it's a Miracle." Renamed Gordy Records in 1962. Notable releases included early recordings by Jimmy Ruffin and the Temptations.
- MoWest Records: MoWest was a short-lived (1971–1973; 1976 in UK) subsidiary for R&B/soul artists based on the West Coast. Shut down when the main Motown office moved to Los Angeles. Notable artists included Lesley Gore, G. C. Cameron, the Sisters Love, Syreeta Wright, the Four Seasons, Commodores (their first two singles in 1972 and 1973), The Devastating Affair, and Los Angeles DJ Tom Clay. Unlike other Motown releases in the UK that were released by Tamla Motown, MoWest retained its US label design and logo for its UK releases as well. In fact, MoWest lasted longer in the UK up until 1976.
- Motown Yesteryear: a label created in late 1970s and used through the 1980s for the reissues of 7-inch singles from all eras of the company's history, after printing in the initial label has ceased. One Motown Yesteryear single made Billboard's Top 40 – the Contours' "Do You Love Me", in 1988, when its inclusion in the film Dirty Dancing revived interest.
- Soul Records: Established in 1964, Soul was a R&B/soul subsidiary for releases with less of a jazz feel and/or more of a blues feel. Notable Soul artists included Jr. Walker & the All-Stars, Shorty Long, Gladys Knight & the Pips, the Originals, the Fantastic Four, and Jimmy Ruffin. The label was dissolved in 1978. This label has no affiliation with the short-lived S.O.U.L. Records, an early 1990s imprint that was founded by the production team the Bomb Squad.
- V.I.P. Records: Established in 1964, V.I.P. was an R&B/soul subsidiary. Notable artists included the Velvelettes, the Spinners, the Monitors, the Elgins and Chris Clark. V.I.P. also was the outlet for pop records that were leased to Motown by EMI (the distributor of Tamla-Motown in Europe). The label was dissolved in 1974.
- Weed Records: A very short-lived subsidiary. Only one release, Chris Clark's 1969 CC Rides Again album, was issued. This release featured the tongue-in-cheek tagline: "Your Favorite Artists Are On Weed". The logo was a parody of the "Snapping Fingers" logo for Stax Records, but the hand in this case is holding up a peace sign. The name "Weed Records" is now owned by the Tokyo/New York-based Weed Records.

=== Additional genre labels ===
==== Country ====
- Mel-o-dy Records.: Established in 1962 as a secondary R&B/soul music subsidiary, Mel-o-dy later focused on white country music artists. Notable Mel-o-dy artists include Dorsey Burnette. The label was dissolved in 1965.
- Hitsville Records.: Founded as Melodyland Records in 1974. After the Melodyland Christian Center threatened legal action, the name was changed to Hitsville in 1976. Like Mel-o-dy before it, Hitsville focused on country music. Run by Mike Curb and Ray Ruff, Hitsville's notable artists included Ronnie Dove, Pat Boone, T. G. Sheppard and Jud Strunk. The label was dissolved in 1977. In the UK, Melodyland/Hitsville material was released on MoWest.
- M.C. Records: Operated 1977 to 1978 as a continuation of the Hitsville label. A joint venture between Gordy and Mike Curb. The Mel-o-dy, Hitsville, and M.C. catalogs are now managed by Mercury Nashville Records.

==== Hip-hop/rap ====
- Wondirection Records.: A record label owned by Stevie Wonder, it had one 12-inch dance release in 1983, the ten-minute rap track "The Crown" by Gary Byrd and the GB Experience.
- Mad Sounds Recordings.: Short-lived hip-hop/rap subsidiary label, released five albums in the mid-1990s- including Zig Zag by Tha Mexakinz,Trendz by Trendz of Culture and Rottin ta da Core by Rottin Razkals.

==== Jazz ====
- Workshop Jazz Records.: Motown's jazz subsidiary, active from 1962 to 1964. Notable Workshop Jazz artists included the George Bohannon Trio, Earl Washington All Stars, and Four Tops (whose recordings for the label went unissued for 30 years). The Workshop Jazz catalog is currently managed by Verve Records.
- Blaze Records.: A short-lived label featuring a Jack Ashford instrumental released in September 1969, "Do The Choo-Choo" with b-side "Do The Choo-Choo Pt II" written by L. Chandler, E. Willis, J. Ashford, with label number 1107.
- Mo Jazz Records.: Another jazz label created in the 1990s, this was Motown's most successful jazz imprint. Notable artists included Norman Brown, Foley, Norman Connors, and J. Spencer. It also reissued instrumental albums like Stevie Wonder's 1968 album Eivets Rednow and Grover Washington Jr.'s CTI/Kudu albums under the Classic Mo Jazz subsidiary. This label (including its roster and catalog) was folded into Verve Records after the PolyGram/Universal merger.

==== Rock ====
- Rare Earth Records.: Established in 1969 after the signing of Rare Earth (after whom the label was named), Rare Earth Records was a subsidiary focusing on blues-oriented and progressive rock styles. Notable acts included Rare Earth, R. Dean Taylor, the Pretty Things, Toe Fat, XIT, and Stoney & Meatloaf. The label also was the subsidiary to house the first white band signed to Motown, the Rustix.
- Prodigal Records.: Purchased by Motown in 1976, Motown used Prodigal Records as a second rock music subsidiary; a successor label to Rare Earth Records. The Rare Earth band moved over to the label following the Rare Earth label's demise. Pop singer Charlene's number 3 pop single for Motown I've Never Been To Me was originally released and charted on this label in 1977 (number 97). Prodigal was dissolved in 1978.
- Morocco Records.: Acronym for "MOtown ROCk COmpany". As the name suggests, Morocco was a rock music subsidiary. Active from 1983 to 1984, it was a short-lived attempt to revive the Rare Earth Records concept. Only seven albums were released on the label. Its two most promising acts, Duke Jupiter and the black new wave trio Tiggi Clay (via their lead singer, Fizzy Qwick) eventually moved to the parent label.

==== Other ====
- Divinity Records.: Short-lived (1962–1963) gospel subsidiary. With five releases by artists- Wright Specials, Gospel Stars, Bernadettes, and Liz Lands. Label sequence starts at 99004 to 99008, the final recording being "We Shall Overcome" (for label number 99008) that was recorded in the Graystone Ballroom, was withdrawn and transferred to GORDY 7023B as the "I Have A Dream" speech by Rev. Dr. Martin Luther King Jr.
- Black Forum Records.: Short-lived (1970–1973) spoken-word subsidiary that focused mainly on albums featuring progressive political and pro-civil rights speeches/poetry. Black Forum issued recordings by the Rev. Dr. Martin Luther King Jr., Stokely Carmichael, Elaine Brown, Langston Hughes, Margaret Danner, and others.
- Natural Resources: This label was active from 1972 to 1973 and in 1976 as a minor subsidiary for white artists and instrumental bands. It later served as a label for Motown, Tamla and Gordy reissues and Motown compilation albums in 1978 and 1979.
- Motown Latino Records.: Short-lived (1982) subsidiary for Spanish-language Latin American music. Its only artist was Jose Feliciano.
- Gaiee Records.: Only one single was released on this label, in 1975; Valentino's gay/lesbian anthem "I Was Born This Way", which was later covered by fellow Motown artist Carl Bean in 1977.

=== Independent labels distributed by Motown ===
- Biv 10 Records: A hip-hop/R&B label that was founded by Bell Biv Devoe/New Edition member Michael Bivins. The label operated throughout most of the 1990s. Its roster included Another Bad Creation, Boyz II Men, and 702.
- Chisa Records: Motown released output for Chisa, a label owned by Hugh Masekela, from 1969 to 1972 (prior to that, the label was distributed by Vault Records).
- CTI Records: Motown distributed output for CTI Records, a jazz label owned by Creed Taylor, from 1974 to 1975. CTI subsidiaries distributed by Motown included Kudu Records, Three Brothers Records, and Salvation Records. With a few exceptions, the bulk of CTI's recordings is now owned by Sony Music Entertainment.
- Ecology Records: A very short-lived label owned by Sammy Davis Jr. and distributed by Motown. Only release: single "In My Own Lifetime"/"I'll Begin Again", by Davis in 1971.
- Gull Records: A UK-based label still in operation, Motown released Gull's output in the US in 1975. Gull had Judas Priest on its roster in 1975, but their LP Sad Wings of Destiny, intended for release by Motown in the US, was issued after the Motown/Gull Deal had fallen through.
- Manticore Records: A record label created by the members of the rock group Emerson, Lake & Palmer. Manticore released albums by ELP and various other Progressive rock artists. Manticore was originally distributed in the U.S. by Atlantic Records from 1973 to 1975 but switched to Motown distribution until the label folded in 1977.
- Never Broke Again: A record label founded by YoungBoy Never Broke Again. The label releases compilation albums and has its own artists signed to the Motown/NBA imprint.
- EZMNY Records, Ty Dolla Sign's record label that signed Leon Thomas III.

=== Miscellaneous labels associated with Motown ===
- Workshop
- Groovesville Records
- Inferno Records
- IPG Records
- Rayber Records
- Ric-Tic Records
- Rich Records
- Summer Camp Records
- Tabu Records

== British (pre-Tamla Motown) labels ==
- London American Records issued the releases for Motown from 1960 to 1961.
- Fontana Records issued the releases for Motown from 1961 to 1962.
- Oriole American Records issued the releases for Motown from 1962 to 1963.
- Stateside Records issued the releases for Motown from 1963 to 1965, when the Tamla Motown label was created.

== See also ==
- Album era
- Hitsville USA
- Motown discography
- Music of Detroit
