= Please Mr. Postman (album) =

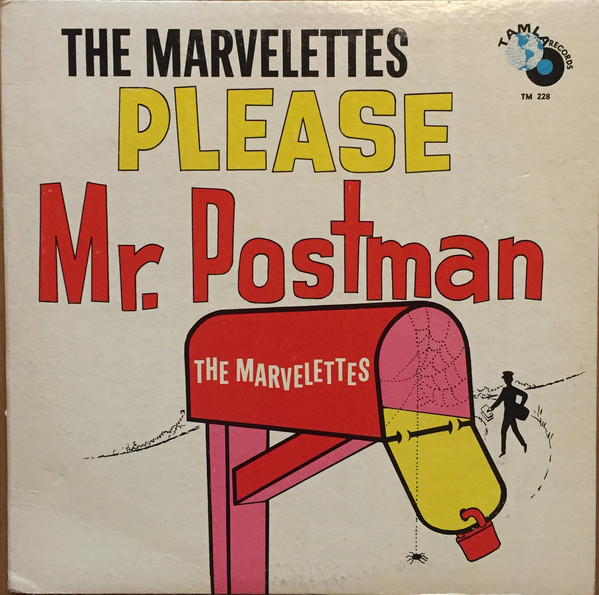

Studio album by The Marvelettes
- Released: 20 November 1961
- Recorded: Hitsville USA; April–July 1961
- Genre: Pop, R&B, soul
- Label: Tamla (Motown)
- Producer: Berry Gordy; Smokey Robinson; Brian Holland

The Marvelettes chronology
Please Mr. Postman (1961)	Playboy (1962)

Singles from Please Mr. Postman
- 1. "Please Mr. Postman" Released: August 21, 1961

Professional ratings
Review scores
Source	Rating
Allmusic	2/5 stars

Please Mr. Postman is the 1961 studio debut album from Motown girl group The Marvelettes and the sixth album ever released by the company. The focal track is the number-one hit single, "Please Mr. Postman". The album notably features cover versions of label mates The Miracles' "Way Over There" and "I Want a Guy", which was the debut single for fellow Motown girl group The Supremes the same year, and their cover had served as the b-side to "Twistin' Postman" the less successful follow-up to "Please Mr. Postman." Although the original version by The Supremes flopped, The Marvelettes' cover became a regional hit.

Other songs on the album include "Oh I Apologize", produced by Smokey Robinson, who would produce much of the group's later material, and "Angel," an early lead for Wanda Young who would later take Gladys Horton's place as the group's main lead singer.

The album art for "Please Mr. Postman" did not contain any images of The Marvelettes, because including African-American artists on album covers did not become customary until around 1963.

Please Mr. Postman received mainly negative reviews as it was believed to have been "too rushed" so that the focal track's success could be capitalized. All of the tracks from the album can be found on the Hip-O Select deluxe compilation CD Forever: The Complete Motown Albums.

== Track listing ==
Superscript identifies lead singer: (a) Gladys Horton, or (b) Wanda Young

=== Side 1 ===
1. "Angel" (Sonny Sanders, Robert Bateman) ^{b}
2. "I Want a Guy" (Brian Holland, Freddie Gorman, Berry Gordy) ^{b}
3. "Please Mr. Postman" (Georgia Dobbins, William Garrett, Freddie Gorman, Brian Holland, Robert Bateman) ^{a}
4. "So Long Baby" (James Young, Brian Holland, Robert Bateman) ^{b}
5. "I Know How It Feels" (Janie Bradford, Robert Bateman, Richard Wylie) ^{b}

=== Side 2 ===
1. "Way Over There" (Berry Gordy, William Robinson) ^{a}
2. "Happy Days" (Berry Gordy) ^{a}
3. "You Don't Want Me No More" (Berry Gordy) ^{a}
4. "All the Love I Got" (Berry Gordy, Janie Bradford) ^{a}
5. "Whisper" (Berry Gordy, Marv Johnson) ^{b}
6. "Oh I Apologize" (Berry Gordy, William Robinson) ^{a}

== Personnel ==
The Marvelettes

- Gladys Horton – lead and background vocals
- Wanda Young – lead and background vocals
- Georgeanna Tillman – background vocals
- Katherine Anderson – background vocals
- Juanita Cowart – background vocals

with:

- Berry Gordy – producer
- Smokey Robinson – producer
- Brian Holland and Robert Bateman – producers
- Raynoma Liles Gordy – Musitron and Ondioline on "I Want a Guy"
- The Funk Brothers – other instrumentation:
  - Richard "Popcorn" Wylie – piano on "Please Mr. Postman", organ on "I Want a Guy"
  - James Jamerson – bass on "Please Mr. Postman" and "I Want a Guy"
  - Marvin Gaye – drums on "Please Mr. Postman", piano on "I Want a Guy"
  - Benny Benjamin – drums on "I Want a Guy"
  - Eddie Willis – guitar on "Please Mr. Postman" and "I Want a Guy"
  - Hank Cosby – tenor saxophone on "I Want a Guy"
  - Andrew "Mike" Terry – baritone saxophone on "I Want a Guy"
