= List of songs written by Holland, Dozier and Holland =

This is a list of songs written by Brian Holland, Lamont Dozier, and Eddie Holland. In most cases the original recordings were for Motown, for whom the three were contracted until 1968. They continued to have success after establishing the Invictus and Hot Wax labels, in some cases using the writing pseudonym "Edyth Wayne" (in various spellings).

The article also lists songs written by any of the three writers, sometimes in collaboration with others.

For a list of their production credits, see Holland–Dozier–Holland#Production.

== Chart hits and other notable songs written by Holland, Dozier and Holland ==
Year	Song	Original artist	^{U.S. Pop}	^{U.S. R&B}	^{UK Singles Chart}	Other charting versions, and notes
1963	"Locking Up My Heart"	The Marvelettes	44	25	-	
1963	"Come and Get These Memories"	Martha and the Vandellas	29	6	-	
1963	"Heat Wave"	Martha and the Vandellas	4	1	-	1975: Linda Ronstadt, #5 US
1963	"A Love Like Yours (Don't Come Knocking Every Day)"	Martha and the Vandellas	-	-	-	1966: Ike & Tina Turner, #16 UK; 1978: Dusty Springfield, #51 UK
1963	"Mickey's Monkey"	The Miracles	8	3	-	
1963	"You Lost the Sweetest Boy"	Mary Wells	22	10	-	
1963	"Can I Get a Witness"	Marvin Gaye	22	3	-	1971: Lee Michaels, #39 US; 1989: Sam Brown, #15 UK
1963	"I Gotta Dance to Keep from Crying"	The Miracles	35	17	-	
1963	"Quicksand"	Martha and the Vandellas	8	7	-	
1963	"When the Lovelight Starts Shining Through His Eyes"	The Supremes	23	2	-	
1964	"Leaving Here"	Eddie Holland	76	27	-	
1964	"Live Wire"	Martha and the Vandellas	42	11	-	
1964	"Run, Run, Run"	The Supremes	93	22	-	
1964	"You're a Wonderful One"	Marvin Gaye	15	3	-	
1964	"A Tear from a Woman's Eyes"	The Temptations	-	3	-	
1964	"In My Lonely Room"	Martha and the Vandellas	44	6	-	
1964	"Just Ain't Enough Love"	Eddie Holland	54	31	-	
1964	"Where Did Our Love Go"	The Supremes	1	1	3	1971: Donnie Elbert, #15 US, #6 R&B, #8 UK; 1974: Diana Ross and the Supremes, #51 UK (reissue); 1976: The J. Geils Band, #68 US; 1978: The Manhattan Transfer, #40 UK; 1996: Tricia Penrose, #71 UK
1964	"Baby I Need Your Loving"	The Four Tops	11	4	-	1964: The Fourmost, #24 UK; 1967: Johnny Rivers, #3 US; 1970: O. C. Smith, #52 US, #30 R&B; 1972: Geraldine Hunt, #47 R&B; 1979: Eric Carmen, #62 US; 1982: Carl Carlton, #17 R&B
1964	"Candy to Me"	Eddie Holland	58	29	-	
1964	"Baby Don't You Do It"	Marvin Gaye	27	14	-	1972: The Band, #34 US
1964	"Baby Love"	The Supremes	1	1	1	1974: Diana Ross and the Supremes, #12 UK (reissue); 1981: Honey Bane, #58 UK
1964	"Ask Any Girl"	The Supremes	-	-	-	1965: Len Barry, "1-2-3", #2 US, #11 R&B, #3 UK; Holland, Dozier and Holland received a co-writing credit for "1-2-3", originally credited to John Madara, David White and Len Barry, after a court decided that the song bore similarities to "Ask Any Girl". 1967: Ramsey Lewis, "One-Two-Three", #67 US; 1972: Len Barry, "1-2-3", #52 UK (reissue)
1964	"Come See About Me"	The Supremes	1	2	27	1964: Nella Dodds, #74 US
1964	"How Sweet It Is (to Be Loved by You)"	Marvin Gaye	6	3	49	1966: Jr. Walker & the All-Stars, #18 US, #3 R&B, #22 UK; 1975: James Taylor, #5 US, #51 UK
1964	"Without the One You Love (Life's Not Worth While)"	The Four Tops	43	17	-	
1965	"Stop! in the Name of Love"	The Supremes	1	2	7	1971: Margie Joseph, #96 US, #38 R&B; 1983: The Hollies, #29 US; 1989: Diana Ross and the Supremes, #62 UK (reissue)
1965	"Nowhere to Run"	Martha and the Vandellas	8	5	26	1969: Martha Reeves and the Vandellas, #42 UK (reissue); 1976, The Dynamic Superiors, #53 R&B; 2000: Nu Generation, "Nowhere to Run 2000", #66 UK, credited to Holland, Dozier, Holland, Hurby Azor and Trevor Jackson
1965	"Mother Dear"	The Supremes	-	-	-	
1965	"Back in My Arms Again"	The Supremes	1	1	40	1978: Genya Ravan, #92 US
1965	"Whisper You Love Me Boy"	The Supremes	-	-	-	
1965	"I Can't Help Myself (Sugar Pie, Honey Bunch)"	The Four Tops	1	1	23	1970: The Four Tops, #10 UK (reissue); 1972: Donnie Elbert, #22 US, #14 R&B, #11 UK; 1979: Bonnie Pointer, #40 US, #42 R&B
1965	"It's the Same Old Song"	The Four Tops	5	2	34	1971: Weathermen, #19 UK; 1978: KC and the Sunshine Band, #35 US, #30 R&B, #47 UK; 1989: Third World, #77 R&B, #80 UK
1965	"Nothing but Heartaches"	The Supremes	11	6	-	
1965	"Take Me in Your Arms (Rock Me a Little While)"	Kim Weston	50	4	-	1975: The Doobie Brothers, #11 US, #29 UK
1965	"I Hear a Symphony"	The Supremes	1	2	39	
1965	"Something About You"	The Four Tops	19	9	-	1977: LeBlanc & Carr, #48 US
1965	"Love (Makes Me Do Foolish Things)"	Martha and the Vandellas	70	22	-	
1965	"Darling Baby"	The Elgins	-	-	-	1972: Jackie Moore, #22 R&B
1966	"My World Is Empty Without You"	The Supremes	5	10	-	1969: Jose Feliciano, #87 US
1966	"Put Yourself in My Place"	The Elgins	92	-	-	1969: The Isley Brothers, #13 UK; 1971: The Elgins, #28 UK (reissue)
1966	"Shake Me, Wake Me (When It's Over)"	The Four Tops	18	5	-	
1966	"This Old Heart of Mine (Is Weak for You)"	The Isley Brothers	12	6	47	Written by Holland, Dozier, Holland, and Sylvia Moy; 1968: The Isley Brothers, #3 UK (reissue); 1969: Tammi Terrell, #67 US, #31 R&B; 1972: Donnie Elbert, #52 UK; 1975: Rod Stewart, #83 US, #4 UK; 1976: The Isley Brothers, #51 UK (reissue); 1990: Rod Stewart with Ronald Isley, #10 US
1966	"Helpless"	Kim Weston	56	13	-	1984: Tracey Ullman, #61 UK
1966	"(I'm a) Road Runner"	Jr. Walker & the All-Stars	20	4	12	
1966	"Love Is Like an Itching in My Heart"	The Supremes	9	7	-	1986: Krystol, #86 R&B; 1990: The Good Girls, #10 R&B
1966	"I Guess I'll Always Love You"	The Isley Brothers	61	31	45	1969: The Isley Brothers, #11 UK (reissue)
1966	"You Can't Hurry Love"	The Supremes	1	1	3	1982: Phil Collins, #10 US, #1 UK
1966	"Little Darling (I Need You)"	Marvin Gaye	47	10	50	1971: Marvin Gaye, #41 UK (reissue); 1977: The Doobie Brothers, #48 US
1966	"Reach Out I'll Be There"	The Four Tops	1	1	1	1968: Merrilee Rush, #79 US; 1971: Diana Ross, #29 US, #17 R&B; 1975: Gloria Gaynor, #60 US, #56 R&B, #14 UK; 1988: The Four Tops, #11 UK (reissue); 1992: Michael Bolton, #73 US, #37 UK
1966	"Love's Gone Bad"	Chris Clark	-	41	-	
1966	"Heaven Must Have Sent You"	The Elgins	50	9	-	1971: The Elgins, #3 UK (reissue); 1979: Bonnie Pointer, #11 US, #52 R&B
1966	"I'm Ready for Love"	Martha and the Vandellas	9	2	22	
1966	"You Keep Me Hangin' On"	The Supremes	1	1	8	1967: Vanilla Fudge, #67 US, #18 UK; 1968: Vanilla Fudge, #6 US (reissue); 1969: Wilson Pickett, #92 US, #16 R&B; 1970: Jackie DeShannon, #96 US; 1977: Roni Hill, UK #36; 1986: Diana Ross and the Supremes, #91 UK (reissue); 1986: Kim Wilde, #1 US, #2 UK
1966	"(Come 'Round Here) I'm the One You Need"	The Miracles	17	4	37	1971: Smokey Robinson and the Miracles, #13 UK (reissue)
1966	"Standing in the Shadows of Love"	The Four Tops	6	2	6	1977: Deborah Washington, #93 R&B
1967	"Love Is Here and Now You're Gone"	The Supremes	1	1	17	
1967	"Jimmy Mack"	Martha and the Vandellas	10	1	21	1970: Martha Reeves and the Vandellas, #21 UK (reissue); 1986: Sheena Easton, #65 US
1967	"Third Finger, Left Hand"	Martha and the Vandellas	-	-	-	1972: The Pearls, #31 UK
1967	"Bernadette"	The Four Tops	4	3	8	1972: The Four Tops, #23 UK (reissue)
1967	"The Happening"	The Supremes	1	12	6	Written by Holland, Dozier, Holland, and Frank De Vol; 1967: Herb Alpert & the Tijuana Brass, #32 US
1967	"7 Rooms of Gloom"	The Four Tops	14	10	12	
1967	"Your Unchanging Love"	Marvin Gaye	33	7	-	
1967	"I'll Turn to Stone"	The Four Tops	76	50	-	Written by Holland, Dozier, Holland, and R. Dean Taylor
1967	"Reflections"	Diana Ross & the Supremes	2	4	5	1976: Leo Sayer
1967	"Going Down for the Third Time"	Diana Ross & the Supremes	-	-	-	
1967	"You Keep Running Away"	The Four Tops	19	7	26	
1967	"In and Out of Love"	Diana Ross & the Supremes	9	16	13	
1967	"Come See About Me"	Jr. Walker & the All-Stars	24	8	51	1987: Shakin' Stevens, #24 UK
1967	"There's a Ghost in My House"	R. Dean Taylor	-	-	-	Written by Holland, Dozier, Holland, and R. Dean Taylor; 1974: R. Dean Taylor, #3 UK (reissue); 1987: The Fall, #30 UK
1968	"Forever Came Today"	Diana Ross & the Supremes	28	17	28	1975: The Jackson 5, #60 US, #6 R&B
1968	"Take Me in Your Arms (Rock Me a Little While)"	The Isley Brothers	-	22	52	1975: The Doobie Brothers, #11 US, #29 UK
1969	"While You're Out Looking for Sugar?"	The Honey Cone	62	26	-	Written by "Edyth Wayne" and Ronald Dunbar; Note: Edyth Wayne was a pseudonym used by Holland, Dozier and Holland for contractual reasons after they left Motown.
1969	"Mind, Body and Soul"	The Flaming Ember	26	-	-	Written by "Edyth Wayne" and Ronald Dunbar
1969	"Crumbs Off the Table"	The Glass House	59	7	-	Written by "Edyth Wayne" and Ronald Dunbar; 1972: Laura Lee, #40 R&B
1969	"Girls, It Ain't Easy"	The Honey Cone	68	8	-	Written by "Edyth Wayne" and Ronald Dunbar
1969	"Unhooked Generation"	Freda Payne	-	43	-	Written by "Edyth Wayne" and Ronald Dunbar
1969	"Too Many Cooks (Spoil the Soup)"	100 Proof (Aged in Soul)	94	24	-	Written by "Edyth Wayne", Angelo Bond and Ronald Dunbar
1970	"Give Me Just a Little More Time"	Chairmen of the Board	3	8	3	Written by "Edyth Wayne" and Ronald Dunbar; 1992: Kylie Minogue, #2 UK
1970	"Shades of Green"	The Flaming Ember	88	-	-	Written by "Edyth Wayne" and Ronald Dunbar
1970	"Take Me With You"	The Honey Cone	-	28	-	Written by "Edyth Wayne" and Ronald Dunbar
1970	"(You've Got Me) Dangling on a String"	Chairmen of the Board	38	19	5	Written by "Edyth Wayne", General Johnson and Ronald Dunbar
1970	"Band of Gold"	Freda Payne	3	20	1	Written by "Edyth Wayne", Daphne Dumas and Ronald Dunbar; 1973: Freda Payne, #53 UK (reissue); 1983: Sylvester, #67 UK; 1986: Bonnie Tyler, #81 UK
1970	"Westbound #9"	The Flaming Ember	24	15	-	Written by "Edyth Wayne", Daphne Dumas and Ronald Dunbar
1970	"Everything's Tuesday"	Chairmen of the Board	38	14	12	Written by "Edyth Wayne", Daphne Dumas and Ronald Dunbar
1970	"Deeper and Deeper"	Freda Payne	24	9	33	Written by "Edyth Wayne", Norma Toney and Ronald Dunbar
1970	"If It Ain't Love, It Don't Matter"	The Glass House	-	42	-	Written by "Edyth Wayne" and Ronald Dunbar
1971	"Stop the World and Let Me Off"	The Flaming Ember	-	43	-	Written by "Edyth Wayne", Angelo Bond and Ronald Dunbar
1971	"Hanging On to a Memory"	Chairmen of the Board	-	28	-	Written by "Edyth Wayne", Daphne Dumas and Ronald Dunbar
1971	"Look What We've Done to Love"	The Glass House	-	31	-	Written by "Edyth Wayne" and Ronald Dunbar
1972	"(The Day I Lost You Was) The Day I Found Myself"	The Honey Cone	23	8	-	Written by "Edyth Wayne", General Johnson and Ronald Dunbar
1972	"Free Your Mind"	The Politicians	-	33	-	
1972	"Everybody's Got a Song to Sing"	Chairmen of the Board	-	30	-	
1972	"Working On a Building of Love"	Chairmen of the Board	-	-	20	
1972	"Thanks I Needed That"	The Glass House	-	47	-	
1972	"Don't Leave Me Starvin' for Your Love"	Holland-Dozier	52	13	-	
1973	"(I'm) Just Being Myself"	Dionne Warwick	-	62	-	Written by Holland, Dozier, Holland and Richard "Popcorn" Wylie
1973	"You're Gonna Need Me"	Dionne Warwick	-	-	-	
1973	"Slipping Away"	Holland-Dozier	-	46	-	
1973	"Two Wrongs Don't Make a Right"	Freda Payne	-	75	-	Written by "Edyth Wayne"
1973	"New Breed Kinda Woman"	Holland-Dozier	-	61	-	
1983	"I Just Can't Walk Away"	The Four Tops	71	36	95	

== Other chart hits and notable songs written by Brian Holland alone or with others ==
Year	Song	Original artist	^{U.S. Pop}	^{U.S. R&B}	^{UK Singles Chart}	Other charting versions, and notes
1960	"All the Love I Got"	Marv Johnson	63	-	-	Written by Berry Gordy Jr., Brian Holland and Janie Bradford
1961	"Please Mr. Postman"	The Marvelettes	1	1	-	Written by Georgia Dobbins, William Garrett, Brian Holland, Robert Bateman and Freddie Gorman; 1964: The Beatles, #92 US (on Four by the Beatles); 1974: The Carpenters, #1 US, #2 UK
1961	"Greetings (This Is Uncle Sam)"	The Valadiers	89	-	-	Written by Brian Holland, Robert Bateman, Ronald Dunbar and The Valadiers; 1966: The Monitors, #100 US, #21 R&B
1962	"Twistin' Postman"	The Marvelettes	34	13	-	Written by Robert Bateman, Brian Holland, and William "Mickey" Stevenson
1962	"Playboy"	The Marvelettes	7	4	-	Written by Brian Holland, Robert Bateman, Gladys Horton, and William "Mickey" Stevenson
1962	"Someday, Someway"	The Marvelettes	-	8	-	Written by Brian Holland, Lamont Dozier, and Freddie Gorman
1962	"Strange, I Know"	The Marvelettes	49	10	-	Written by Brian Holland, Lamont Dozier, and Freddie Gorman
1963	"Forever"	The Marvelettes	78	24	-	Written by Brian Holland, Lamont Dozier, and Freddie Gorman; 1973: Baby Washington & Don Gardner, # 30 R&B
1968	"I'm in a Different World"	The Four Tops	51	23	27	Written by Brian Holland, Lamont Dozier, and R. Dean Taylor
1970	"Stealing Moments from Another Woman's Life"	The Glass House	-	42	-	Written by Brian Holland and Lamont Dozier
1971	"Chairman of the Board"	Chairmen of the Board	42	10	48	Written by Brian Holland and Lamont Dozier
1971	"Cherish What Is Dear to You (While It's Near to You)"	Freda Payne	44	11	46	Written by Brian Holland, Lamont Dozier, and Angelo Bond
1971	"Try On My Love for Size"	Chairmen of the Board	-	48	-	Written by Brian Holland and Lamont Dozier
1971	"You Brought the Joy"	Freda Payne	52	21	-	Written by Brian Holland and Lamont Dozier
1973	"Forever"	Baby Washington and Don Gardner	-	30	-	Written by Brian Holland, Lamont Dozier and Freddie Gorman; 1980: Chuck Cissel, #87 R&B
1974	"I Need It Just As Bad As You "	Laura Lee	-	55	-	Written by Brian Holland, Eddie Holland Jr. and Richard "Popcorn" Wylie
1975	"We're Almost There"	Michael Jackson	54	7	46	Written by Brian Holland and Eddie Holland Jr.
1975	"Just a Little Bit of You"	Michael Jackson	23	4	-	Written by Brian Holland and Eddie Holland Jr.
1975	"All I Do Is Think of You"	The Jackson 5	-	50	-	Written by Brian Holland and Michael Lovesmith; 1990: Troop, #47 pop, #1 R&B; 2005: B5 (as "All I Do"), #71 R&B
1975	"Get the Cream Off the Top"	Eddie Kendricks	50	7	-	Written by Brian Holland and Eddie Holland Jr.
1975	"Where Do I Go From Here"	The Supremes	-	93	-	Written by Brian Holland and Eddie Holland Jr.
1975	"I'm So Glad"	Jr. Walker	-	43	-	Written by Brian Holland
1976	"Keep Holdin' On"	The Temptations	54	3	-	Written by Brian Holland and Eddie Holland Jr.
1976	"I'm Gonna Let My Heart Do the Walking"	The Supremes	40	25	-	Written by Brian Holland and Eddie Holland Jr.
1976	"High Energy"	The Supremes	-	-	-	Written by Brian Holland, Eddie Holland Jr., and Harold Beatty
1981	"Oh I Need Your Loving"	Eddie Kendricks	-	41	-	Written by Brian Holland and Eddie Holland Jr.
1984	"Love Gone Bad"	Mavis Staples	-	75	-	Written by Brian Holland and Eddie Holland Jr.

== Other chart hits and notable songs written by Lamont Dozier ==
Year	Song	Original artist	^{U.S. Pop}	^{U.S. R&B}	^{UK Singles Chart}	Other charting versions, and notes
1975	"Let Me Start Tonite"	Lamont Dozier	87	4	-	Written by Lamont Dozier
1975	"All Cried Out"	Lamont Dozier	-	41	-	Written by Lamont Dozier
1976	"Can't Get Off Until the Feeling Stops"	Lamont Dozier	-	89	-	Written by Lamont Dozier
1982	"Shout About It"	Lamont Dozier	-	61	-	Written by Lamont Dozier, Sy Goraieb and Gary Rotter
1991	"Love in the Rain"	Lamont Dozier	-	60	-	Written by Lamont Dozier

== Other chart hits and notable songs written by Eddie Holland Jr. with others ==
Year	Song	Original artist	^{U.S. Pop}	^{U.S. R&B}	^{UK Singles Chart}	Other charting versions, and notes
1964	"The Girl's Alright with Me "	The Temptations	-	39	-	Written by Eddie Holland, Norman Whitfield and Eddie Kendricks
1964	"Girl (Why You Wanna Make Me Blue) "	The Temptations	26	11	-	Written by Eddie Holland and Norman Whitfield
1964	"Too Many Fish in the Sea"	The Marvelettes	25	5	-	Written by Eddie Holland and Norman Whitfield; 1967: Mitch Ryder & the Detroit Wheels, #24 pop
1965	"Everybody Needs Love"	The Temptations	-	-	-	Written by Eddie Holland and Norman Whitfield; 1967: Gladys Knight & the Pips, #39 pop, #3 R&B
1965	"He Was Really Sayin' Something "	The Velvelettes	64	21	-	Written by Eddie Holland, Norman Whitfield, and William "Mickey" Stevenson; 1982: Bananarama with Fun Boy Three, #5 UK
1966	"Ain't Too Proud to Beg "	The Temptations	13	1	21	Written by Eddie Holland and Norman Whitfield; 1974: The Rolling Stones, #17 pop 1989: Rick Astley, #89 pop
1966	"Beauty Is Only Skin Deep"	The Temptations	3	1	18	Written by Eddie Holland and Norman Whitfield
1966	"(I Know) I'm Losing You"	The Temptations	8	1	10	Written by Eddie Holland, Norman Whitfield, and Cornelius Grant; 1970: Rare Earth, #20 R&B; 1986: Uptown, #87 pop
1967	"All I Need"	The Temptations	8	2	60	Written by Eddie Holland, Frank Wilson, and R. Dean Taylor
1967	"(Loneliness Made Me Realize) It's You That I Need"	The Temptations	14	3	-	Written by Eddie Holland and Norman Whitfield
1968	"Gotta See Jane"	R. Dean Taylor	-	-	17	Written by Eddie Holland, R. Dean Taylor and Ronald Miller; 1971: R. Dean Taylor, #67 pop (reissue)
1971	"Everything Is Good About You"	The Lettermen	74	-	-	Written by Eddie Holland and James Dean

== See also ==
- Holland-Dozier-Holland
