= Playboy (The Marvelettes album) =

Studio album by The Marvelettes
- Released: July 1962
- Recorded: Hitsville USA; 1962
- Genre: Pop, R&B
- Label: Tamla (Motown)
- Producer: George Gordy, William "Mickey" Stevenson, Marvin Gaye, Brian Holland, Lamont Dozier, Robert Bateman

The Marvelettes chronology
| Please Mr. Postman (1961) | Playboy (1962) | The Marvelous Marvelettes (1963) |

Singles from Playboy
- 1. "Playboy" Released: April 9, 1962; 2. "Beechwood 4-5789" Released: July 11, 1962

Professional ratings
Review scores
| Source | Rating |
|---|---|
| AllMusic | 3/5 stars |
| The Encyclopedia of Popular Music | 3/5 stars |
| The Rolling Stone Album Guide | 3/5 stars |

Playboy is the third album by the Motown girl group The Marvelettes, released in 1962. It capitalized on their hit singles "Playboy" and "Beechwood 4-5789". It also includes the single "Someday, Someway" and "Forever", a heartfelt standard that would be released the following year as the B-side of the single "Locking Up My Heart" and join the A-side on the charts. Other compositions include "Goddess of Love", "Cry Over You", and "Mix It Up". George Gordy, William "Mickey" Stevenson and Marvin Gaye, who had produced "Beechwood 4-5789" all did some work on the Playboy LP as well.

The album would be the last to feature the backing vocals of original Marvelette, Juanita Cowart on every track, as she would opt out of the group in early 1963.

== Track listing ==
Superscript denotes lead singer: (a) Gladys Horton, (b) Wanda Young

Side 1

1. "Playboy" (Gladys Horton, Brian Holland, William Stevenson, Robert Bateman) ^{a}
2. "Mix It Up" (William Stevenson) ^{a}
3. "Beechwood 4-5789" (Marvin Gaye, George Gordy) ^{a}
4. "I'm Hooked" (Berry Gordy, Jr.) ^{a}
5. "I Think I Can Change You" (William Robinson) ^{a}

Side 2

1. "Forever" (Brian Holland, Lamont Dozier, Freddie Gorman) ^{b}
2. "Someday, Someway" (Brian Holland, Lamont Dozier, Freddie Gorman) ^{a}
3. "Goddess of Love" (Lamont Dozier) ^{b}
4. "You Should Know" (Brian Holland, Janie Bradford, Stanley Ossman) ^{a}
5. "(I've Got To) Cry Over You" (Berry Gordy, Jr.) ^{a}

== Personnel ==
The Mervelettes

- Gladys Horton – lead and background vocals
- Wanda Young – lead and background vocals
- Georgeanna Tillman – background vocals
- Katherine Anderson – background vocals
- Wyanetta "Juanita" Cowart – background vocals

with:

- Marvin Gaye – producer, drums on "Beechwood 4-5789"
- William "Mickey" Stevenson – producer
- George Gordy – producer
- Raynoma Liles Gordy – Hammond organ on "Forever" and "Someday, Someday"
- The Funk Brothers – other instrumentation
  - Joe Hunter – piano on "Playboy", "Forever" and "Someday, Someday"
  - Richard "Popcorn" Wylie – piano on "Beechwood 4-5789"
  - James Jamerson – bass on "Playboy" and "Beechwood 4-5789"
  - Clarence Isabell – bass on "Forever" and "Someday, Someday"
  - Benny Benjamin – drums on "Playboy", "Forever" and "Someday, Someday"
  - Eddie Willis – guitar on "Playboy", "Beechwood 4-5789", "Forever" and "Someday, Someday"
  - Hank Cosby – tenor saxophone on "Playboy", "Beechwood 4-579", "Forever" and "Someday, Someday"
  - Andrew "Mike" Terry – baritone saxophone on "Playboy", "Beechwood 4-5789", "Forever" and "Someday, Someday"
  - Eddie "Bongo" Brown – percussion on "Beechwood 4-5789"
