= The Marvelous Marvelettes =

Studio album by The Marvelettes
- Released: February 28, 1963
- Recorded: Hitsville USA; 1962–1963
- Genre: Pop, R&B
- Label: Tamla (Motown)
- Producer: Brian Holland, William "Mickey" Stevenson, Berry Gordy, Norman Whitfield, Lamont Dozier

The Marvelettes chronology
Playboy (1962)	The Marvelous Marvelettes (1963)	The Marvelettes Recorded Live on Stage (1963)

Singles from The Marvellous Marvelettes
- 1. "Strange I Know" Released: October 29, 1962; 2. "Locking Up My Heart" Released: February 15, 1963; 3. "My Daddy Knows Best" Released: July 1, 1963

Professional ratings
Review scores
Source	Rating
Allmusic	3.5/5 stars

The Marvelous Marvelettes is the fourth studio album released by the Marvelettes for the Tamla label. It is the first album to not feature original Marvelette, Juanita Cowart (except on four tracks), who left the group in early 1963. The group would remain a quartet for the next two years. Also featured on the album is Rosalind Ashford of Martha and the Vandellas, who filled in for Marvelette Wanda Young in the studio while the latter was on maternity leave, while Florence Ballard of The Supremes replaced her in live performances. The album features three singles: 'Strange I Know' (#49 US, #10 R&B), 'Locking Up My Heart' (#44 US, #25 R&B), and 'My Daddy Knows Best' (#67 US).

== Track listing ==
Side A

1. "Strange I Know" (Brian Holland, Lamont Dozier, Freddie Gorman)
2. "I Forgot About You" (William Stevenson)
3. "Locking Up My Heart" (Brian Holland, Lamont Dozier, Eddie Holland)
4. "Which Way Did He Go" (William Stevenson)
5. "Silly Boy" (Norman Whitfield)

Side B

1. "It's Going to Take a Lot of Doing" (Norman Whitfield, William Stevenson)
2. "Smart Aleck" (Norman Whitfield, William Stevenson)
3. "My Daddy Knows Best" (Berry Gordy Jr.)
4. "Too Strong to Be Strung Along" (Brian Holland, Lamont Dozier, Freddie Gorman)
5. "Why Must You Go" (Norman Whitfield, William Stevenson)

== Personnel ==
- Gladys Horton – lead vocals (all tracks); backing vocals on "Locking Up My Heart"
- Wanda Young – backing vocals (side A, tracks 1 and 3; side B, tracks 3 and 4); co-lead vocals on "Locking Up My Heart"
- Georgeanna Tillman – backing vocals (all tracks)
- Katherine Anderson – backing vocals (all tracks)
- Wyanetta "Juanita" Cowart – backing vocals (side A, track 1 and 3; side B, track 3 and 4)
- Rosalind Ashford – backing vocals (side A, tracks 2, 4, and 5; side B, tracks 1, 2, and 5)
- The Funk Brothers – instrumentation
- Brian Holland – producer
- William "Mickey" Stevenson – producer
- Lamont Dozier – producer
- Norman Whitfield – producer
- Berry Gordy – producer
