= Beechwood 4-5789 =

1962 single by The Marvelettes

Single by the Marvelettes

from the album Playboy
- B-side: "Someday, Someway"
- Released: July 11, 1962
- Recorded: May 19, 1962
- Genre: Rock and roll, soul, doo-wop, R&B
- Length: 2:13
- Label: Tamla
- Songwriters: Marvin Gaye, William "Mickey" Stevenson, George Gordy
- Producer: William "Mickey" Stevenson

The Marvelettes singles chronology
"Playboy" (1962)	"Beechwood 4-5789" / "Someday, Someway" (1962)	"Strange I Know" (1962)

"Beechwood 4-5789" is a song written by Marvin Gaye, William "Mickey" Stevenson and George Gordy. It was a 1962 hit single for the Motown girl group the Marvelettes on Motown's Tamla subsidiary record label. The song became a hit again when it was covered by the pop duo the Carpenters in 1982.

The song's title is derived from the sequence 234–5789 and the now-defunct use of telephone exchange names in telephone numbers. The first two letters of the exchange "Beechwood" (BE) are substituted to the numbers 2 and 3 on a rotary dial, and then joined to the remaining numbers. In the case of this title, the remaining numbers are 4–5789, together forming the full telephone number of 234–5789.

== The Marvelettes version ==
=== Background ===
The lyrics are about the singer wanting a man she just met to call her number in order to "have a date, any ol' time." As with all the Marvelettes' other singles during the first phase of the group's career, the lead vocal was by Gladys Horton. The song's co-writer Marvin Gaye played drums on the track, which William Stevenson produced. The single was taken from the group's 1962 album Playboy.

=== Reception ===
"Beechwood 4-5789" has become a signature hit of Motown's early period, but it was not one of the label's biggest hits. However, it reached the Pop Top 20 of the Billboard Hot 100 as number 17 in the autumn of 1962. The track also reached the R&B Top Ten where it achieved double A-side status with "Beechwood 4-5789" reaching number 7 and the flip "Someday, Someway" number 8; the latter track was a ballad from the writing-and-production team of Brian Holland, Lamont Dozier and Freddie Gorman and featured Berry Gordy Jr.'s wife Raynoma Liles as organist.

=== Chart performance ===
Chart (1962)	Peak position
Canada (CHUM Hit Parade)	9
US Billboard Hot 100	17
US Billboard R&B	7

=== Personnel ===
- Lead vocals by Gladys Horton
- Background vocals by Wanda Young, Georgeanna Tillman, Wyanetta ("Juanita") Cowart, and Katherine Anderson
- Instrumentation by The Funk Brothers
  - Richard "Popcorn" Wylie – piano
  - Eddie Willis – guitar
  - James Jamerson – bass
  - Hank Cosby – tenor saxophone
  - Andrew "Mike" Terry – baritone saxophone
  - Marvin Gaye – drums
  - Eddie "Bongo" Brown – percussion

== Carpenters version ==
"Beechwood 4-5789"

Single by Carpenters

from the album Made in America
- B-side: "Two Sides"
- Released: January 1982
- Recorded: 1980–1981
- Genre: Pop
- Length: 3:06
- Label: A&M; 2344
- Songwriters: Marvin Gaye, William "Mickey" Stevenson, George Gordy
- Producer: Richard Carpenter

Carpenters singles chronology
"Those Good Old Dreams" (1981)	"Beechwood 4-5789" (1982)	"Make Believe It's Your First Time" (1983)

=== Background ===
A remake of "Beechwood 4-5789" was featured on Made in America, a 1981 album by the Carpenters whose 1975 remake of the Marvelettes' "Please Mr. Postman" had reached number one.

Although Richard Carpenter typically exercised control over the Carpenters' song choice, the idea to remake "Beechwood 4-5789" was evidently Karen Carpenter's. Mike Curb recalls Karen playing him the original over the phone after telling him: "I've gotta play a song for you! You'll get a kick out of it! It is really fun! It'll bring back memories." When the record ended, Karen asked Curb; "So, what do you think of this as a single?" Although Curb saw no hit potential in a remake of "Beechwood 4-5789" he responded positively to her question, not having the heart to dampen her enthusiasm.

=== Reception ===
"Beechwood 4-5789" would be issued as the fourth single from Made in America^{1)} on March 2, 1982, Karen Carpenter's thirty-second birthday. The track debuted on the A/C chart in Billboard dated March 27, 1982 and entered the Billboard Hot 100 dated April 24, 1982 at number 83 becoming the twenty-seventh single by the Carpenters to reach the Hot 100, all the group's singles since their major label debut in 1969 having appeared on the chart.

The last single release by the Carpenters prior to Karen Carpenter's death on February 4, 1983, "Beechwood 4-5789" did not become a major hit, rising no higher than number 74 on the Hot 100; the track's A/C chart peak was number 18. "Beechwood 4-5789" did reach number 10 in New Zealand in March 1982 – the single having been released there that February prior to its US issue – making the track the last evident top ten hit by the Carpenters on a major national chart.

=== Music video ===
A 1960s nostalgia-themed video for the Carpenters' "Beechwood 4-5789" was shot on A&M's Chaplin Stage. The video's setting is divided between a soda shop where a scene shows the song's single to be put in a jukebox by a man and then the couples in their chairs dance and Karen sings, and a young woman's bedroom (implied to be that of Karen's character) where Karen sings seated in front of a dresser. Karen is then shown seated and singing alongside Richard playing the keyboard; the footage is superimposed onto the dresser in the bedroom, making the duo appear miniature, especially alongside a pink Princess telephone. The video ends with Richard and Karen singing along with the band performing in the shop in front of the couples dancing on seats.

=== Chart performance ===
Chart (1982)	Peak position
New Zealand (RIANZ)	10
Quebec (ADISQ)	10
US Cashbox	88
US Billboard Hot 100	74
US Billboard Adult Contemporary	18

=== Personnel ===
- Karen Carpenter – lead and backing vocals
- Richard Carpenter – backing vocals, piano, Wurlitzer electric piano, orchestration
- Tim May – electric guitar
- Joe Osborn – bass
- Ron Tutt – drums
- Gayle Levant – harp
- Tom Scott – baritone and tenor saxophones
- Uncredited – castanets, tambourine, cowbell

== Other versions ==
- In the wake of the song's popularity, novelty musician Bill Buchanan (songwriter) referenced it in his 1962 Halloween song, "Beware." The song talks about a teenage ghoul whose phone number is Transylvania 4-5789.
- A cover of "Beechwood 4-5789" served as the debut single for Ian and the Zodiacs in September 1963.
- Harpers Bizarre remade "Beechwood 4-5789" for their 1976 album As Time Goes By.
- St. Louis ska band Isaac Green and the Skalars recorded a version for their 1996 album, Skoolin' with the Skalars.
- The song appears on Dionne Bromfield's 2009 debut album Introducing Dionne Bromfield.

== See also ==
- 634-5789 (Soulsville, U.S.A.)
- 867-5309/Jenny
- Pennsylvania 6-5000 (song)
- Fictitious telephone number
