= Twistin' Postman =

Single by The Marvelettes

from the album The Marvelettes Sing
- B-side: "I Want a Guy"
- Released: December 6, 1961
- Recorded: November 29, 1961
- Genre: Rock 'n' roll
- Label: Tamla; T-54054
- Songwriter(s): Robert Bateman; Brian Holland; William "Mickey" Stevenson
- Producer(s): Brian Holland, Robert Bateman (or "Brianbert") and William "Mickey" Stevenson

The Marvelettes singles chronology
"Please Mr. Postman" (1961)	"Twistin' Postman" (1961)	"Playboy" (1962)

"Twistin' Postman" is a song recorded by Motown singing group The Marvelettes, who released it in 1961, and was the follow-up to their smash debut single, "Please Mr. Postman".

== Background ==
Like their previous single, the vocals are led by original Marvelette Gladys Horton, and is partially based on the then-current Twist dance move. The song's subject is a sequel of the original "Postman" single and this time the narrator is finally happy that the postman has delivered a letter from the narrator's boyfriend.

== Credits ==
- Lead vocals by Gladys Horton
- Background vocals by Wanda Young, Katherine Anderson, Georgeanna Tillman and Juanita Cowart
- Instrumentation by The Funk Brothers

== Chart performance ==
The song became a modest hit for the group reaching number thirteen on the R&B charts, and number thirty-four on the pop singles chart in early 1962. A third single, "Playboy", returned the group to the top ten of the pop and R&B charts later that year.

Chart (1962)	Peak position
US Billboard Hot 100	34
US Billboard Hot R&B Sides	13
