= When You're Young and in Love =

Song written by Van McCoy

Single by The Marvelettes

from the album The Marvelettes
- B-side: "The Day You Take One, You Have to Take the Other"
- Released: April 20, 1967
- Recorded: 1967
- Genre: Pop, soul
- Length: 2:38
- Label: Tamla
- Songwriter: Van McCoy
- Producers: James Dean, William Weatherspoon

The Marvelettes singles chronology
"The Hunter Gets Captured by the Game" (1967)	"When You're Young and in Love" (1967)	"My Baby Must Be a Magician" (1967)

"When You're Young and In Love"

Single by The Flying Pickets
- B-side: "Monica Engineer"
- Released: 1984
- Genre: Pop
- Length: 3:25
- Label: 10 Records
- Songwriter: Van McCoy
- Producer: John Sherry

The Flying Pickets singles chronology
"Who's That Girl" (1984)	"When You're Young and In Love" (1984)	"So Close" (1984)

"When You're Young and in Love" is a song composed by Van McCoy and first recorded by Ruby & the Romantics in 1964. It became a top 30 hit single for the Marvelettes in 1967 and a top 10 hit for the Flying Pickets in 1984.

== Ruby & the Romantics original version ==
=== Background ===
The first recording of the song was by Ruby & the Romantics; like all the group's singles on Kapp Records, the track was produced by label A&R head Allen Stanton. Released in September 1964, "When You're Young..." reached the top five in Honolulu but otherwise failed to register strongly in any US market, reaching No. 48 on the Billboard Hot 100 in November 1964. Ruby & the Romantics scored one subsequent Hot 100 placing, with "Does He Really Care for Me" (#87). However, "When You're Young..." was a bigger hit in Canada, peaking at No. 25 on the RPM Top Tracks chart.

=== Personnel ===
- Lead vocal by Ruby Nash
- Background vocals by Ed Roberts, George Lee, Ronald Mosley, and Leroy Fann
- Instrumentation by Unknown

== The Marvelettes version ==
=== Background ===
The song was covered in 1967 by the Marvelettes. Produced by James Dean and William Weatherspoon, their version reached No. 23 on the Hot 100 that June; its R&B peak was No. 9. Although not one of the Marvelettes' most successful US hits, "When You're Young and in Love" became the only record by the group to achieve hit status in the UK with a No. 13 peak in July 1967.

The track is also one of the last Marvelettes' singles to feature Gladys Horton although the lead is by Wanda Rogers; Horton would only appear, and lead, on the following two B-sides. Besides Horton and veteran Marvelette Katherine Anderson, Rogers' vocal backing on "When You're Young..." features Motown's premier session singers the Andantes while the original instrumental backing on the track by the Funk Brothers was augmented by the Detroit Symphony Orchestra.

=== Personnel ===
- Lead vocal by Wanda Young Rogers
- Background vocals by Gladys Horton, Katherine Anderson and the Andantes: Marlene Barrow, Jackie Hicks and Louvain Demps
- Instrumentation by the Funk Brothers and the Detroit Symphony Orchestra

=== Charts ===
Chart (1967)	Peak position
UK Singles (OCC)	13
UK R&B (Record Mirror)	3
US Billboard Hot 100	23
US Hot R&B/Hip-Hop Songs (Billboard)	9

== Flying Pickets version ==
"When You're Young and In Love"

Single by The Flying Pickets

from the album Lost Boys
- B-side: "Monica Engineer"
- Released: 1984
- Genre: Pop
- Length: 3:25
- Label: 10 Records
- Songwriter: Van McCoy
- Producer: John Sherry

The Flying Pickets singles chronology
"Who's That Girl" (1984)	"When You're Young and In Love" (1984)	"So Close" (1984)

The song had its strongest chart impact via a 1984 cover version by the Flying Pickets, produced by John Sherry. It reached number 7 in the UK. This version of the song was featured in the Netflix series Sex Education.

== Other versions ==
- In the autumn of 1975, competing versions of "When You're Young and in Love" by Ralph Carter and the Choice Four charted on the R&B chart with the Carter version reaching #37 and the Choice Four version peaking at #45; both versions were also minor Hot 100 crossovers with respective peaks of #95 (Carter) and #91 (Choice Four). Ralph Carter promoted his version with a performance on the April 3, 1976 episode of his Good Times sitcom; his recording was produced by Norman Bergen and Reid Whitelaw. The Choice Four version was produced by the song's composer Van McCoy.
- A 1979 remake of "When You're Young and in Love" is notable as the debut single for Stacy Lattisaw and also for being produced by composer Van McCoy; however the McCoy-produced album Young and in Love proved neither a critical or commercial success upon release in July 1979 - the month of McCoy's death - with the "When You're Young..." single barely registering on the R&B charts at #91.
