= Locking Up My Heart =

Single by The Marvelettes

from the album The Marvelous Marvelettes
- B-side: "Forever"
- Released: February 15, 1963 (1st Ver.); April 1963 (2nd Ver.)
- Recorded: Hitsville U.S.A. (Studio A); January 8, 1963 (A-Side); 1962 (B-Side)
- Genre: Rock and roll, doo-wop, R&B
- Length: 2:24 (A-Side); 2:17 (B-Side)
- Label: Tamla T 54077
- Songwriters: A-side: Holland–Dozier–Holland; B-side: Holland–Dozier–Gorman
- Producers: Brian Holland; Lamont Dozier

The Marvelettes singles chronology
"Strange I Know" (1963)	"Locking Up My Heart" / "Forever" (1963)	"My Daddy Knows Best" (1963)

"Locking Up My Heart" is a 1963 single released by Motown girl group The Marvelettes on the Tamla record label.

The first charting single written and produced by Motown's main production team Holland–Dozier–Holland,^{1} "Locking Up My Heart" was also the first single to feature Wanda Young as lead vocalist on the A-side, albeit in a split lead vocal with main lead vocalist Gladys Horton. The track was recorded 8 January 1963 in Studio A Hitsville USA and released 15 February 1963; the B-side: "Forever", was a cut from the 1962 Playboy album, written and produced by Holland–Dozier–Gorman (H-D-H's predecessor), and also featured Young as lead vocalist.

On the single's initial A-Side, Horton, as the main lead and narrator, tells the audience that she's giving up love, as she's "tired of being abused" and "mis-used". The flip-side, narrated by Young, tells us she's so devoted to her love that she'll endure any pain and suffering for it. The second single of the group where both sides charted, it would be promoted as if it were a "double A-side" by the label. This is also one of the last Marvelettes' singles to feature member Juanita Cowart (in the background) on either side. By the time of the single's release, Cowart, who had already ceased performing on stage, would permanently leave the group and had retired from both performing and recording.

"Locking Up My Heart" broke out in Baltimore and San Francisco to enter the Billboard Hot 100 dated 23 March 1963 at #83; Motown considered the track to be significant enough to re-press it with adjusted instrumentation that April. However "Locking Up My Heart" lost its strong initial momentum as disc jockeys in some markets - including Pittsburgh - began to play the intended B-side: "Forever", and the Hot 100 dated 4 May 1963 showed "Locking Up My Heart" stalled at #44 as "Forever" debuted at #100; subsequently "Locking Up My Heart" would abruptly drop from the chart while "Forever"'s popularity would fail to coalesce into major hit impact with the track peaking at #78.

Both sides of the single ranked in the R&B Top 30 where "Locking Up My Heart" (#25) was succeeded by "Forever"(#24).

Cash Box described "Locking Up My Heart" as "a sensational shuffle-rocker...that the femmes and their musical accompaniment ‘lock up’ in solid chart style."

Cash Box described Marvin Gaye's 1964 cover of "Forever" as "a slow-shufflin' tradition-styled blues lament rendered with loads of authority and feeling."

- ^{1}The first Holland-Dozier-Holland production was "Dearest One" an overlooked 1962 release by Lamont Dozier.

== Personnel ==
- Lead vocals by Gladys Horton (verses - A-side) and Wanda Young (choruses, outro - A-side; B-side),
- Background vocals by Gladys Horton, Wanda Young, Georgeanna Tillman, Wyanetta ("Juanita") Cowart, and Katherine Anderson
- Instrumentation by The Funk Brothers

== Charts ==
Chart (1963)	Peak position
Canada (CHUM Hit Parade)	20
U.S. Billboard Hot 100	44
U.S. Billboard R&B Singles	25
