= Too Many Fish in the Sea =

Single by the Marvelettes

from the album The Marvelettes Greatest Hits
- B-side: "A Need for Love"
- Released: October 14, 1964
- Recorded: September 22, 1964
- Genre: Soul
- Label: Tamla; T 54105
- Songwriters: Norman Whitfield; Eddie Holland
- Producer: Norman Whitfield

The Marvelettes singles chronology
"You're My Remedy" (1964)	"Too Many Fish in the Sea" (1964)	"I'll Keep Holding On" (1965)

"Too Many Fish in the Sea" is a 1964 hit song recorded by Motown girl group the Marvelettes. It was the group's first top 40 pop hit in almost a year, reaching #25 on the Billboard Hot 100, and was one of the first hit singles written by Norman Whitfield; Eddie Holland also had a hand in the writing. "Too Many Fish..." was also Whitfield's first produced single.

== Background ==
This record is the only one where group members Georgeanna Tillman and Katherine Anderson had a lead on the A-side. This is also the final A-side appearance for Tillman, who would leave the group, due to her illnesses, in very early 1965, before they recorded their next single, "I'll Keep Holding On". This would also be the last single in which Gladys Horton would lead on the A-side, as Wanda Young Rogers (who also led on this and the two previous singles) would be the group's sole lead on A-sides, relegating Horton to B-side leads. Norman Whitfield would later use similar vocal techniques with the Temptations on hit songs such as "I Can't Get Next To You" and "Cloud Nine".

== Personnel ==
- Lead and background vocals by Gladys Horton (verses and choruses), Wanda Young (choruses), Georgeanna Tillman (choruses) and Katherine Anderson (choruses)
- Instrumentation by the Funk Brothers

== Chart performance ==
Chart (1964–65)	Peak position
US Billboard Hot 100	25
US Top 50 in R&B Locations (Cash Box)	5

== Later versions and usage ==
- Mitch Ryder and the Detroit Wheels also charted "Too Many Fish" as a medley with "Three Little Fishes". It reached #24 in 1967.
- Although The Marvelettes version of "Too Many Fish in the Sea" does not appear in the 1983 film The Big Chill it is included on both the Original Motion Picture Soundtrack and More Songs from the Big Chill.
- The Marvelettes version was used in the 1999 film Bringing Out The Dead.
