= I'll Keep Holding On =

Single by The Marvelettes
- B-side: "No Time for Tears"
- Released: May 11, 1965
- Recorded: 1965 Hitsville USA
- Genre: R&B, Soul
- Label: Tamla
- Songwriters: William "Mickey" Stevenson; Ivy Jo Hunter
- Producers: William "Mickey" Stevenson, Ivy Jo Hunter

The Marvelettes singles chronology
"Too Many Fish in the Sea" (1964)	"I'll Keep Holding On" (1965)	"Danger: Heartbreak Dead Ahead" (1965)

"I'll Keep Holding On" is a song composed by Mickey Stevenson and Ivy Jo Hunter and recorded by Motown singing group The Marvelettes, who released the single on the Tamla imprint in 1965. Peaking at No. 34 on the Billboard Hot 100 (and No. 11 on the R&B charts), This was among the first A-side singles that longtime Marvelettes member Wanda Young sung lead on. Before 1965, the majority of the leads in Marvelettes songs had belonged to original member Gladys Horton. The single features a woman determined to win the love of an unfulfilled conquest telling him that she'll convince him to love her "until my will to resist is gone". Her Marvelettes bandmates Gladys Horton and Katherine Anderson egg her on with her ad-libbing "oh yeah/sho' nuff" in the bridge leading up to the chorus. The single was covered by British mod-pop act, The Action in 1966. It then returned across the Atlantic in 1998 to be released on Mink Rat or Rabbit by the Detroit Cobras.

Cash Box described it as "a shufflin’ pop-blues tearjerker about a love-sick gal who contends that she'll stick with her guy no matter what he does" and said that the song has "tremendous potential."

== Credits ==
- Lead vocals by Wanda Young
- Background vocals by Gladys Horton, Katherine Anderson and The Andantes (Jackie Hicks, Marlene Barrow, Louvain Demps)
- Instrumentation by The Funk Brothers
  - Drums by Benny Benjamin
  - Piano by Johnny Griffith
  - Bass by James Jamerson
  - Guitars by Eddie Willis and Joe Messina
  - Baritone saxophone by Mike Terry
  - Tenor saxophone by Norris Patterson
  - Trombone by George Bohannon and McKinley Jackson
  - Trumpet by Herbie Williams and John Wilson
