= Playboy (The Marvelettes song) =

Single by The Marvelettes

from the album Playboy
- B-side: "All the Love I've Got"
- Released: April 9, 1962
- Recorded: November 22, 1961, Hitsville USA (Studio A) (Detroit, Michigan)
- Genre: Rhythm and blues
- Label: Tamla; T-54060
- Songwriters: Brian Holland; Robert Bateman; Gladys Horton; Mickey Stevenson
- Producers: Robert Bateman, Brian Holland (aka "Brianbert")

The Marvelettes singles chronology
"Twistin' Postman" (1962)	"Playboy" (1962)	"Beechwood 4-5789" (1962)

"Playboy" is a song composed by Brian Holland, Robert Bateman, Mickey Stevenson and singer Gladys Horton, lead vocalist of the Motown singing group The Marvelettes, who recorded the song and released it as a single on Motown's Tamla imprint on April 9, 1962. The single, led by Horton, is about a man who fools around with a lot of women and the woman who narrates the story warns him to stay away from her due to the stories she heard of him "running around with every woman in town". Horton is helped out in the song by her Marvelettes cohorts Wanda Young, Georgeanna Tillman, Katherine Anderson & Juanita Cowart. This was released as the third single by the Marvelettes and was their second top ten pop hit reaching number seven on the charts while reaching number four on the R&B chart. In Canada it was number 6 for 3 weeks.

The song is sampled in the Dickie Goodman novelty break-in record "Ben Crazy" (1962). A satire on the television doctor's show Ben Casey.

== Credits ==
- Lead vocal by Gladys Horton
- Background vocals by Wanda Young, Georgeanna Tillman, Katherine Anderson and Juanita Cowart
- Instrumentation by The Funk Brothers
- Produced by William "Mickey" Stevenson
