= Georgeanna Tillman =

American singer (1944–1980)

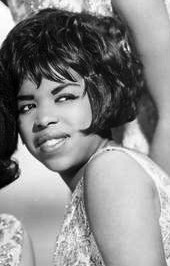
- Tillman in 1963

Background information
- Also known as: Georgeanna Tillman Gordon
- Born: Georgeanna Marie Tillman; February 6, 1944; Inkster, Michigan, U.S.
- Died: January 6, 1980 (aged 35) Inkster, Michigan, U.S.
- Occupation: Singer
- Years active: 1960–1965

Georgeanna Marie Tillman Gordon (February 6, 1944 – January 6, 1980) was an American singer and an original member of the Motown girl group the Marvelettes.

== Life and career ==
Tillman was born and raised in the Detroit suburb of Inkster, Michigan. Tillman had three sisters, Sharon, Anna Marie, and Thea, and her parents were Annabelle and George Tillman, her namesakes. In 1960, Tillman was recruited into a girl group with her former Inkster High School glee club members Gladys Horton, Katherine Anderson and Juanita Cowart. Georgia Dobbins was later added to the lineup by Horton.

=== Career with the Marvelettes ===
The group called themselves The Casinyets, short for "we can't sing yet". The group auditioned for Motown after the talent show, and while the audition was successful, the group was requested to give a musical composition. After Dobbins created the composition "Please Mr. Postman", Dobbins left the group after her father refused to let her perform in the group. The group changed their name to the Marvelettes shortly after Motown signed the act, and Dobbins was replaced by Wanda Young. In 1961, the group released "Please Mr. Postman" in 1961. The single would top the charts, peaking at No. 1 on the Billboard Hot 100, becoming Motown's first No. 1 Pop hit. The group would score hits such as such as "Playboy", "Beechwood 4-5789", "Someday, Someway", "Strange I Know", Locking Up My Heart, and "Too Many Fish in the Sea". In 1965, Tillman left the group after her diagnosis with lupus, and still suffering from sickle cell disease. Her doctor advised her to leave show business for good, as the disease worsened. She continued to work at Motown as a secretary until Motown moved to Los Angeles.

=== Personal life and death ===
Tillman married Billy Gordon, lead singer of the Contours, on August 12, 1963. They have a son, Darrian.

Before her death, she was a student at the Wayne County Community College and was a secretary at Plymouth State Hospital. Tillman died on January 6, 1980 at her home in Inkster, Michigan from complications of lupus or sickle cell disease. She was interred at the Metropolitan Memorial Park in Belleville, Michigan.
