= My Baby Must Be a Magician =

Single by The Marvelettes

from the album Sophisticated Soul
- B-side: "I Need Someone"
- Released: November 21, 1967
- Recorded: Hitsville U.S.A. (Studio A); Detroit, Michigan; 1967
- Genre: Pop, soul
- Length: 2:32
- Label: Tamla
- Songwriter(s): William "Smokey" Robinson
- Producer(s): Smokey Robinson

The Marvelettes singles chronology
"When You're Young and in Love" (1967)	"My Baby Must Be a Magician" (1967)	"Here I Am Baby" (1968)

"My Baby Must Be a Magician" is a 1967 song written and produced by Smokey Robinson and recorded by the Marvelettes.

== Background ==
Wanda Young Rogers was the lead vocalist on the track; the background vocals were provided by the Andantes rather than Marvelettes Ann Bogan and Katherine Anderson. Melvin Franklin of The Temptations is the male voice speaking the song's intro and the track features guitar licks from Miracles guitarist Marv Tarplin.

The narrator of the song likens her lover to a magician admitting his lack of the expected paraphernalia (e.g. "No rabbits in his hat/ No pigeons up his sleeve...No special gear like Aladdin's lamp and such") but maintaining "My baby must be a magician 'cause he's sure got the magic touch".

== Personnel ==
- Lead vocals by Wanda Rogers
- Background vocals by The Andantes: Marlene Barrow, Jackie Hicks and Louvain Demps
- Introduction by Melvin Franklin
- Guitar by Marv Tarplin
- Other instrumentation by The Funk Brothers
- Written and produced by Smokey Robinson

== Chart performance ==
Released in November 1967, "My Baby Must Be a Magician" reached #17 on the Billboard Hot 100 in February 1968, also peaking at #8 on the R&B chart. As the Marvelettes' third consecutive Top Thirty single, "My Baby Must Be a Magician" set a new level of prolonged pop chart success for the group; it marked their last appearance in the Top 40 and was their final R&B Top Ten hit.

== Cover versions & interpolations ==
"My Baby Must Be a Magician" has never had a high-profile remake;

- Stiff Records act Sylvia and the Sapphires had a 1983 UK single release produced by Peter Collins.
- On the title track of Teena Marie's 1981 album It Must Be Magic - her last for Motown - Teena Marie repeats the hookline from "My Baby Must Be a Magician": "My baby must be a magician 'cause he's sure got the magic touch", as her song's outro. (Melvin Franklin's original intro is also included in this song.)
