= Don't Mess with Bill =

Single by The Marvelettes

from the album The Marvelettes Greatest Hits
- B-side: "Anything You Wanna Do"
- Released: November 26, 1965
- Recorded: Hitsville USA; June 1965
- Genre: Soul, pop
- Length: 2:51
- Label: Tamla; T 54126
- Songwriter: Smokey Robinson
- Producer: Smokey Robinson

The Marvelettes singles chronology
"Danger Heartbreak Dead Ahead" (1965)	"Don't Mess with Bill" (1965)	"You're the One" (1966)

"Don't Mess with Bill" is a song recorded by the Marvelettes for Motown Records' Tamla label. Written and produced by Smokey Robinson, "Don't Mess with Bill" features a lead vocal by Wanda Young. The single peaked at number seven on the Billboard Hot 100 in February 1966, and at number three on Billboard's R&B singles chart. "Don't Mess with Bill" was the Marvelettes' final top 10 single.

== Background ==
The titular "Bill" referenced is not an allusion to the song's author, Bill "Smokey" Robinson. Robinson reports that he chose the name because it fit the lyrics, not because it was his.

Cash Box described it as a "funky medium-paced pop-blues shuffler about love-struck gal who serves notice on one and all to leave her fella alone."

== Personnel ==
- Lead vocals by Wanda Young Rogers
- Background vocals by the Andantes: Jackie Hicks, Marlene Barrow, and Louvain Demps
- Instrumentation by the Funk Brothers
  - Bass – James Jamerson
  - Congas – Eddie "Bongo" Brown
  - Drums – Benny Benjamin
  - Guitar – Robert White
  - Organ – Earl Van Dyke
  - Baritone saxophone – Andrew "Mike" Terry
  - Tenor saxophone solo – Norris Patterson
  - Trombone – Don White, Paul Riser
  - Trumpet – Floyd Jones, John Trudell
  - Vibraphone – Jack Ashford

== Chart performance ==
Chart (1965–1966)	Peak position
Canada (CHUM Hit Parade)	31
Canada (RPM 100)	70
US Billboard Hot 100	7
US Top Selling Rhythm & Blues Singles (Billboard)	3

== Other versions ==
- It was included as part of the Spinners' "Superstar Medley", released on the 1975 Spinners Live! album.
