= Inkster, Michigan =

- City
- City of Inkster
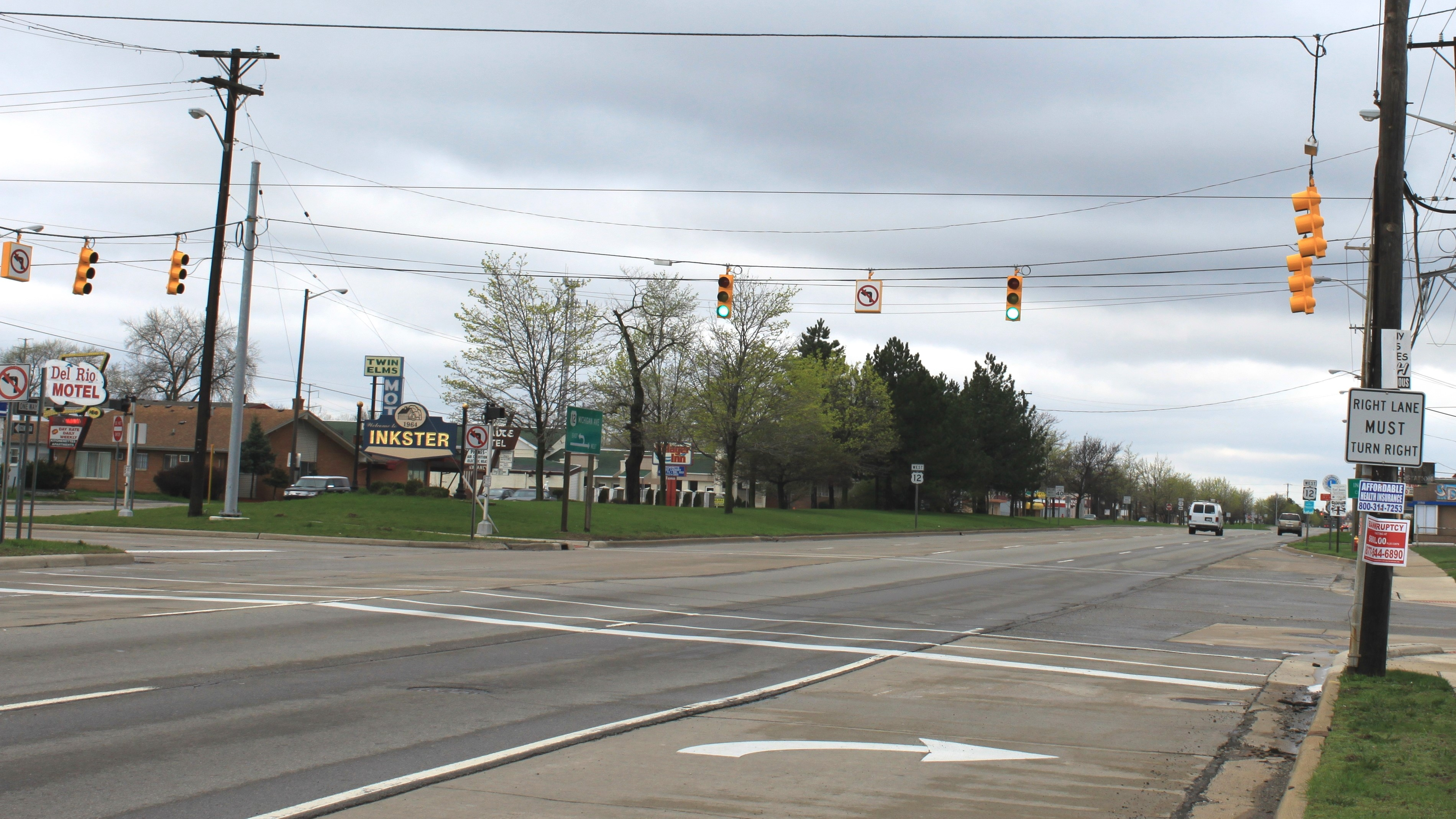
- Facing west at Beech Daly and Michigan Avenue

- Location within Wayne County

- Location within the state of Michigan Location within the United States
- Coordinates: 42°17′33″N 83°18′51″W
- Country: United States
- State: Michigan
- County: Wayne
- Settled: 1835
- Incorporation: 1926 (village); 1964 (city)

Government
  - Type: Council–manager
  - Mayor: Byron Nolen
  - Manager: Mark Stuhldreher

Area
  - City: 6.25 sq mi (16.20 km^{2})
  - Land: 6.25 sq mi (16.19 km^{2})
  - Water: 0 sq mi (0.00 km^{2})
- Elevation: 623 ft (190 m)

Population (2020)
  - City: 26,088
  - Density: 4,172.2/sq mi (1,610.91/km^{2})
  - Metro: 4,285,832 (Metro Detroit)
- Time zone: UTC-5 (EST)
  - Summer (DST): UTC-4 (EDT)
- Zip code(s): 48141
- Area codes: 313 and 734
- FIPS code: 26-40680
- GNIS feature ID: 0629039
- Website: cityofinkster.com

Inkster is a city in Wayne County in the U.S. state of Michigan. A western suburb of Detroit, Inkster is located about 14 miles (23 km) southwest of downtown Detroit. As of the 2020 census, the city had a population of 26,088.

== History ==
The area was originally inhabited by Native Americans. It was settled by non-indigenous people in 1825. A post office named "Moulin Rouge" was established there in December 1857. Robert Inkster, a Scotsman born March 27, 1828, in Lerwick, Shetland, operated a steam sawmill on present-day Inkster Road near Michigan Avenue in the early 1860s.

The post office was renamed "Inkster" in July 1863. The village had a station on the Michigan Central Railroad by 1878. It incorporated as a village in 1926 from parts of Nankin Township and Dearborn Township. After much legal wrangling by the city of Dearborn, Dearborn Township, and the village of Inkster to sort out final borders for these communities, Inkster was incorporated as a city in 1964.

In the 1920s and 1930s, African-Americans working in Henry Ford's Dearborn factories settled in Inkster, as it was closer to their work than Detroit, while they were not allowed to live in Dearborn itself.

As a result of the police beating of Floyd Dent in January 2015, which was caught on a police vehicle's dash cam and released to the public, the victim was awarded $1.4 million. A special assessment of Inkster residents will pay for the settlement, on their July 1, 2015, property tax bill.

== Geography ==
According to the United States Census Bureau, the city has a total area of 6.25 square miles (16.19 km^{2}), all land.

== Demographics ==
Historical population
Census	Pop.	Note	%±
1930	4,440		—
1940	7,044		58.6%
1950	16,728		137.5%
1960	39,097		133.7%
1970	38,595		−1.3%
1980	35,190		−8.8%
1990	30,772		−12.6%
2000	30,115		−2.1%
2010	25,369		−15.8%
2020	26,088		2.8%
U.S. Decennial Census

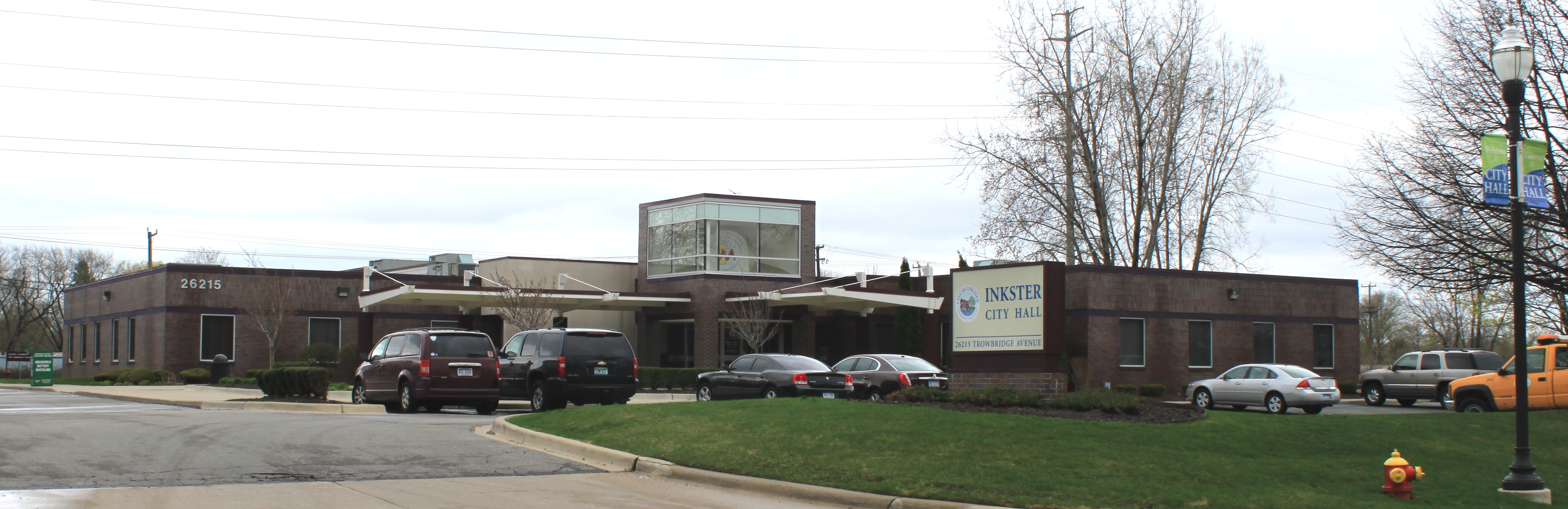
Inkster City Hall

=== Racial and ethnic composition ===
Inkster city, Michigan – Racial and ethnic composition Note: the US Census treats Hispanic/Latino as an ethnic category. This table excludes Latinos from the racial categories and assigns them to a separate category. Hispanics/Latinos may be of any race.
Race / Ethnicity (NH = Non-Hispanic)	Pop 2000	Pop 2010	Pop 2020	% 2000	% 2010	% 2020
White alone (NH)	7,379	4,959	4,562	24.50%	19.55%	17.49%
Black or African American alone (NH)	20,267	18,413	18,984	67.30%	72.58%	72.77%
Native American or Alaska Native alone (NH)	111	70	83	0.37%	0.28%	0.32%
Asian alone (NH)	1,023	409	197	3.40%	1.61%	0.76%
Native Hawaiian or Pacific Islander alone (NH)	3	4	3	0.01%	0.02%	0.01%
Other race alone (NH)	83	46	153	0.28%	0.18%	0.59%
Mixed race or Multiracial (NH)	767	815	1,308	2.55%	3.21%	5.01%
Hispanic or Latino (any race)	482	653	798	1.60%	2.57%	3.06%
Total	30,115	23,369	26,088	100.00%	100.00%	100.00%

=== 2020 census ===
As of the 2020 census, Inkster had a population of 26,088. The median age was 33.8 years. 27.2% of residents were under the age of 18 and 12.9% of residents were 65 years of age or older. For every 100 females there were 88.2 males, and for every 100 females age 18 and over there were 84.2 males age 18 and over.

100.0% of residents lived in urban areas, while 0.0% lived in rural areas.

There were 10,123 households in Inkster, of which 34.4% had children under the age of 18 living in them. Of all households, 20.3% were married-couple households, 25.7% were households with a male householder and no spouse or partner present, and 45.8% were households with a female householder and no spouse or partner present. About 32.3% of all households were made up of individuals and 11.0% had someone living alone who was 65 years of age or older.

There were 11,485 housing units, of which 11.9% were vacant. The homeowner vacancy rate was 2.3% and the rental vacancy rate was 9.9%.

Racial composition as of the 2020 census
Race	Number	Percent
White	4,698	18.0%
Black or African American	19,135	73.3%
American Indian and Alaska Native	94	0.4%
Asian	202	0.8%
Native Hawaiian and Other Pacific Islander	3	0.0%
Some other race	378	1.4%
Two or more races	1,578	6.0%

=== 2010 census ===
As of the census of 2010, there were 25,369 people, 9,821 households, and 6,175 families residing in the city. The population density was 4,059.0 inhabitants per square mile (1,567.2/km^{2}). There were 11,647 housing units at an average density of 1,863.5 per square mile (719.5/km^{2}). The racial makeup of the city was 73.2% African American, 20.5% White, 0.3% Native American, 1.6% Asian, 0.1% Pacific Islander, 0.7% from other races, and 3.6% from two or more races. Hispanic or Latino of any race were 2.6% of the population.

There were 9,821 households, of which 35.5% had children under the age of 18 living with them, 25.7% were married couples living together, 30.0% had a female householder with no husband present, 7.1% had a male householder with no wife present, and 37.1% were non-families. 31.6% of all households were made up of individuals, and 9.1% had someone living alone who was 65 years of age or older. The average household size was 2.56 and the average family size was 3.24.

The median age in the city was 34.2 years. 27.9% of residents were under the age of 18; 10.6% were between the ages of 18 and 24; 25.4% were from 25 to 44; 24.8% were from 45 to 64; and 11.3% were 65 years of age or older. The gender makeup of the city was 46.8% male and 53.2% female.

=== 2000 census ===
At the 2000 census, there were 30,115 people, 11,169 households and 7,460 families residing in the city. The population density was 4,808.1 inhabitants per square mile (1,856.4/km^{2}). There were 12,013 housing units at an average density of 1,918.0 per square mile (740.5/km^{2}). The racial makeup of the city was 67.51% African American, 28.7% White, 0.41% Native American, 3.42% Asian, 0.01% Pacific Islander, 0.74% from other races, and 2.76% from two or more races. Hispanic or Latino of any race were 1.60% of the population.

There were 11,169 households, of which 33.1% had children under the age of 18 living with them, 34.0% were married couples living together, 26.8% had a female householder with no husband present, and 33.2% were non-families. 27.9% of all households were made up of individuals, and 9.2% had someone living alone who was 65 years of age or older. The average household size was 2.67 and the average family size was 3.26.

Age distribution was 29.8% under the age of 18, 9.2% from 18 to 24, 30.3% from 25 to 44, 19.8% from 45 to 64, and 10.8% who were 65 years of age or older. The median age was 32 years. For every 100 females, there were 91.3 males. For every 100 females age 18 and over, there were 85.2 males.

The median household income was $35,950, and the median family income was $41,176. Males had a median income of $37,986 versus $26,567 for females. The per capita income for the city was $16,711. About 15.2% of families and 19.5% of the population were below the poverty line, including 28.8% of those under age 18 and 13.4% of those age 65 or over.

== Government and infrastructure ==
The city had 63 police officers in 2010. In 2013 it had 25 police officers. Inkster Justice Center, which is to house the Inkster Police Department and the 22nd District Court, was scheduled to be opened in Spring 2014. Financed with bond funds, it had a cost of $7.7 million and had a shortfall of about $400,000 in the construction fund.

=== Police brutality lawsuit settlements ===
In 2017, it was reported that a one-time property tax assessment of nearly $200 was levied on Inkster residents to cover settlements in police brutality cases. The largest individual settlement was to Floyd Dent for $1.4 million after the 57-year-old man was pulled over and badly beaten as evidenced by the police officer's dashboard camera.

== Education ==
Portions of Inkster are within the Wayne-Westland Community Schools, Westwood Community Schools, Taylor School District, and the Romulus School District.

Westwood operates Daly Elementary School and the Tomlinson Middle School in Inkster. Robichaud High School in Dearborn Heights is the district high school.

Wayne-Westland operates David Hicks Elementary School in Inkster. The portions of Inkster that are located in the Wayne-Westland district are zoned to Hicks. One portion of the Hicks zone is assigned to Marshall Upper Elementary School, Stevenson Middle School in Westland, John Glenn High School, all in Westland. Another portion of the Hicks zone is assigned to Adams Upper Elementary School in Westland, Franklin Middle School in Wayne, and Wayne Memorial High School in Wayne.

Portions of Inkster that had been in the Taylor School District prior to the dissolution of the Inkster School District are assigned to Taylor Parks Elementary School, Hoover Middle School, and Taylor High School in Taylor.

Romulus Senior High School is the Romulus district's secondary school.

Burger Baylor School for Students with Autism of the Garden City School District is located in Inkster, in the former Baylor-Woodson Elementary School.

=== Education history ===
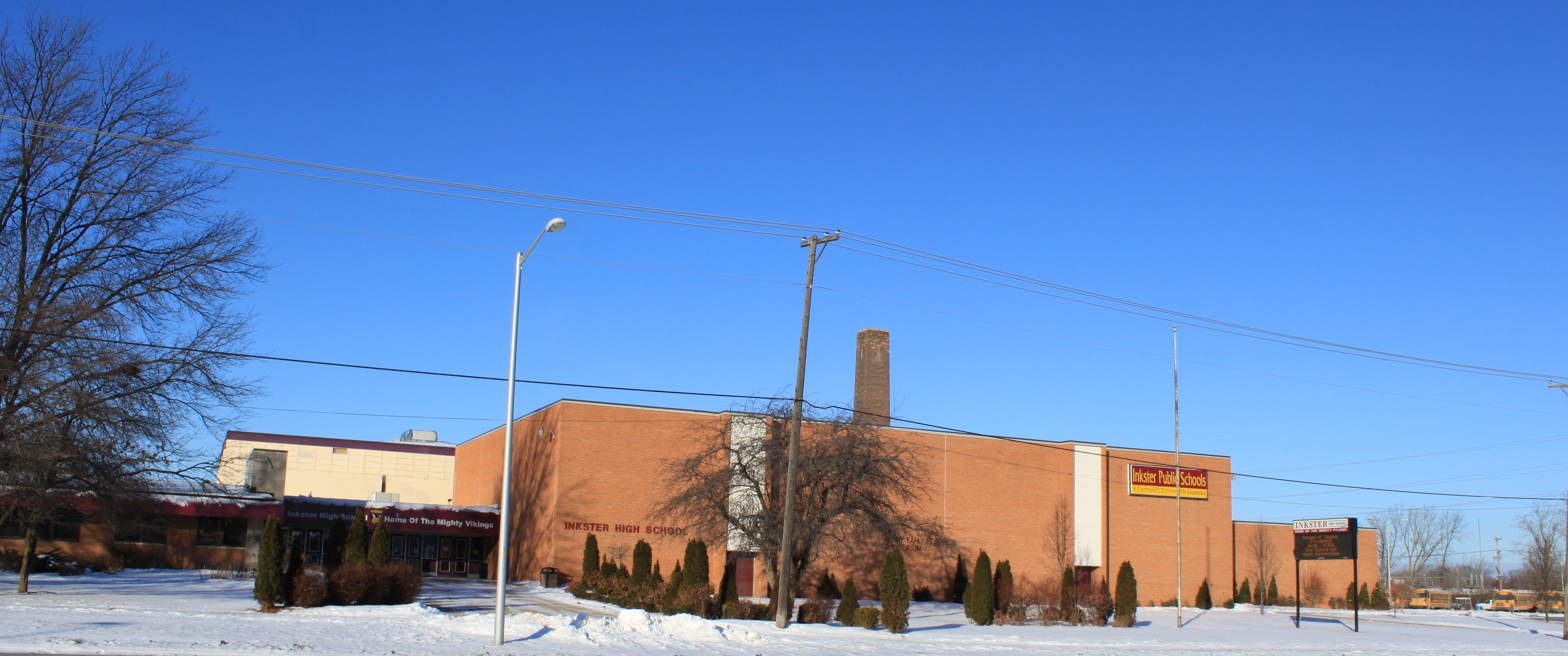
Inkster High School, now closed

Previously most of Inkster was within the Inkster Public Schools district. As of summer 2013, the Inkster Public Schools District was entirely dissolved. The remaining students were split up among the Taylor, Romulus, Wayne-Westland and Westwood districts. Inkster High School, the high school of the Inkster district, closed in 2013 and demolished in 2015. Areas were given to the new districts by quadrants. Students north of Michigan Avenue and west of Middlebelt were rezoned to Wayne-Westland. Students north of Michigan Avenue and east of Middlebelt were rezoned to Westwood. Students south of Michigan Avenue and west of Middlebelt were rezoned to Romulus. Students south of Michigan and east of Middlebelt were rezoned to Taylor.

Areas of Inkster in the Taylor district were zoned to Harry S. Truman High School, until it merged into Taylor High in 2018.

== Notable people ==
- Vern Buchanan, U.S. Representative of Florida, grew up in Inkster and graduated from Inkster High in 1969
- Geraldine Doyle, woman who might have served as model for iconic "We Can Do It!" poster
- Marcus Fizer, professional basketball player
- Wade Flemons, noted R&B singer, musician and songwriter, wrote "Stand By Me" sung by The Platters; member of Earth, Wind, and Fire, until 1973
- Earl Jones, middle-distance runner, bronze medalist in 1984 Olympics
- Jewell Jones, youngest person in Michigan to be elected councilman and then elected state representative
- J'Leon Love, professional boxer
- Keshawn Martin, professional football player
- Jeralean Talley, the world's oldest living person until her death
- Tyrone Wheatley, professional football player, MVP of 1993 Rose Bowl for Michigan, born in Inkster
- The Marvelettes, R&B singing trio in Vocal Group Hall of Fame
  - Katherine Anderson
  - Gladys Horton
  - Georgeanna Tillman
  - Wanda Young
  - Juanita Cowart
