= Georgia Dobbins =

American singer-songwriter (1942–2020)

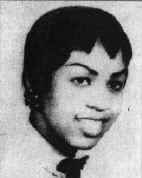
- Dobbins in her Inkster High School yearbook

Background information
- Born: May 8, 1942; Carthage, Arkansas, U.S.
- Died: September 18, 2020 (aged 78) Wayne, Michigan, U.S.
- Formerly of: The Marvelettes

Georgia Dobbins-Davis (May 8, 1942 – September 18, 2020) was an American singer and songwriter.

== Early life ==
Georgia Dobbins was born in Carthage, Arkansas on May 8, 1942, the first child of seven to Arlanders and Mercile Dobbins. The family later relocated to Ypsilanti, Michigan, moving into the Willow Run Clay Hill area, a series of homes established for black World War II veterans, after her father fought in Philippines. During her early years, she was inspired by vocalists Ruth Brown, Etta James, and Sarah Vaughan to sing and perform, and sung doo-wop, which led to her leading groups, and sung at the Willow Run Baptist Church with friend Nickolas Ashford. After Clay Hill was torn down, Georgia and her family relocated to Inkster, Michigan.

== Career ==
In 1960, with her classmates, Dobbins formed the singing group The Casinyets, which turned into The Marvels, and later rechristened the Marvelettes. She left the group in 1961 before signing to the Tamla label due to family commitments and her father refusing her to sing, and was replaced by Wanda Young.

Dobbins was most remembered for co-authoring "Please Mr. Postman", notable for becoming the first Motown song to reach the number-one position on the Billboard Hot 100 singles chart. The song was later covered in 1963 by The Beatles, and topped the charts again in 1975 with a cover by The Carpenters.

== Personal life and death ==
After leaving the Marvelettes, Dobbins attended Cleary College for Business Administration, and worked as a cashier at Farmer Jack. Dobbins married James Davis in 1966; Davis preceded Dobbins in death in 1969. They had one daughter, Kimberly.

Dobbins died of cardiac arrest on September 18, 2020.
