= The Marvelettes =

American girl group (1960–1970)

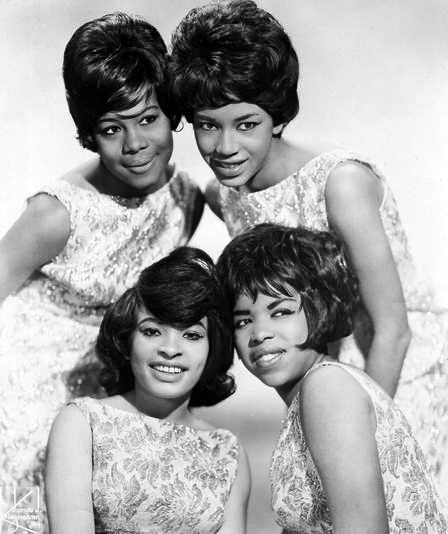
- The Marvelettes in a 1963 promotional photo. Clockwise from top left: Gladys Horton, Katherine Anderson, Georgeanna Tillman, and Wanda Young.

Background information
- Also known as: The Casinyets; The Marvels; The Darnells
- Origin: Inkster, Michigan, U.S.
- Genres: R&B; rock and roll; doo-wop; pop; soul
- Years active: 1960–1970; 1990
- Label: Tamla
- Past members: Gladys Horton; Katherine Anderson; Georgeanna Tillman; Wanda Young; Juanita Cowart; Georgia Dobbins; Ann Bogan

The Marvelettes were an American girl group formed in Inkster, Michigan in 1960, consisting of schoolmates Gladys Horton, Katherine Anderson, Georgeanna Tillman, Juanita Cowart (now Cowart Motley), and Georgia Dobbins, who was replaced by Wanda Young prior to the group signing their first record deal. Achieving popularity in the early to mid-1960s, they were the first successful act of Motown Records after the Miracles and its first significantly successful female group after the release of the 1961 number-one single, "Please Mr. Postman", one of the first number-one singles recorded by an all-female vocal group and the first by a Motown recording act.

The group struggled with problems of poor promotion from Motown, health issues and substance abuse, with Cowart the first to leave in 1963, followed by Tillman in 1965, and Horton in 1967. Nevertheless, they managed a comeback in 1966 with "Don't Mess with Bill". In 1969, the group ceased performing and disbanded the next year, following the release of The Return of the Marvelettes featuring only Young (under her married name, Wanda Rogers). That year, both Rogers and Katherine Anderson retired from the music business.

== History ==
=== Origins and initial success ===
The group that would become the Marvelettes formed at Inkster High School in Inkster, Michigan, a suburb located west of Detroit, Michigan by fifteen-year-old glee club member Gladys Horton in the fall of 1960. Horton enlisted older glee club members Katherine Anderson, Georgeanna Tillman, Juanita Cowart, and a high school graduate Georgia Dobbins (May 5, 1942 – September 18, 2020) to join her. The members struggled to come up with a name for their new act until one of the members jokingly took a stab at their own singing abilities, saying "we can't sing yet." Horton altered the saying to "the Casinyets".

In 1961, the quintet, now called the Marvels, entered a talent show contest on the behest of their teacher and ended up finishing in fourth place. Though only the first three winners were offered a trip to audition for the fledgling Motown label, two of the girls' schoolteachers advised that they be allowed to audition too. Upon auditioning for Motown executives including Brian Holland and Robert Bateman, they had a second audition with bigger staff including Smokey Robinson and the label president and founder, Berry Gordy, who while impressed with their vocal styles advised them to come back with their own composition. Returning to Inkster, Georgia Dobbins contacted a local musician named William Garrett, who had an unfinished blues composition titled "Please Mr. Postman"; Garrett allowed Dobbins to use it as long as he received songwriting credit if the song became a hit. Despite having no previous songwriting experience, Dobbins took the song home and reshaped it overnight to reflect the teenage sound of doo-wop.

Prior to returning to Motown, Dobbins left the group due to her growing family and her father, who advised her not to continue her career in show business. Dobbins' departure left Horton in full charge of the group. To replace her, Horton asked another Inkster graduate, Wanda Young, to replace Dobbins. When the group returned and performed their composition, Gordy agreed to work with the group but under the advice that they change their name. Gordy renamed them the Marvelettes and signed the act to Motown's Tamla division in July 1961. The following month, the group recorded "Please Mr. Postman", which was polished by Brian Holland, Robert Bateman and Freddie Gorman, another songwriting partner of Holland (before Holland became part of the Holland–Dozier–Holland team), who moonlighted as a mailman, as well as the song "So Long Baby", sung by Wanda. Tamla issued "Please Mr. Postman" on August 21, 1961. The song then climbed to the top of the singles chart, reaching number one that December, making them the first Motown act to have a chart-topper on the Hot 100.

To follow up on this success, Motown had the group record "Twistin' Postman" to take advantage of the twist dance craze and the re-release of Chubby Checker's "The Twist". The song eventually peaked at number 34 on the pop chart in early 1962. Before the end of 1961, Tamla issued the first Marvelettes album, also named Please Mr. Postman, but it failed to chart. The group's next single, "Playboy", marked the second time one of their singles was written by a band member, this time by Gladys Horton. Like "Postman", the song was retooled by other writers and upon its release in early 1962, reached number 7. A fourth hit, "Beechwood 4-5789", co-written by Marvin Gaye, reached number 17. During 1962, two more albums would be issued by the band including Smash Hits of '62 (later issued as The Marvelettes Sing) and Playboy. Following the success of "Beechwood", R&B radio stations also frequently played the single's flip side, "Someday, Someway", which paid off sending the song to number 8 on the R&B chart; their first double-sided hit.

Due to their success, the group had to leave school in order to perform and despite the promise of tutors to help with their schooling, they were never granted any. Due to their young ages and Horton being an orphaned ward of the courts, they eventually were taken in by Esther Gordy Edwards, who bused them to Motortown Revue shows. After several successful top 40 recordings, the group released the modest success, "Strange I Know", which peaked at number 49. In early 1963, the group was shortened to a quartet when Juanita Cowart opted to leave, citing a mental breakdown caused by stress from performing on the road, and her embarrassment at getting flustered during an interview appearance on American Bandstand (wherein she identified Detroit as a suburb of Inkster, rather than the other way around). Carrying on as a quartet, the group issued one of Holland–Dozier–Holland's early compositions, "Locking Up My Heart", which peaked at number 44. It was one of the first singles to feature Horton and Young in co-leads. The success of "Locking" was probably tested due to strong airplay by the song's B-side, the Young-led ballad "Forever", which also received a pop charting, peaking at number 78. Then Berry Gordy composed and produced the single, "My Daddy Knows Best", but it was their lowest charting at the time, number 67.

=== Departure of Georgeanna Tillman and renewed success ===
By 1964, the majority of American vocal groups—especially all female bands such as the Shirelles and the Ronettes—started struggling with finding a hit, after the arrival of British pop and rock acts. In the meantime, other Motown girl groups such as Martha and the Vandellas and the Supremes were starting to get promoted by Motown staff, with the Vandellas becoming the top girl group of 1963. The following year, the Supremes took their place as the label's top female vocalist group after a succession of hit recordings that year, culminating in the release of their second album, Where Did Our Love Go, which Motown was able to promote successfully. Some sources claim "Where Did Our Love Go" was turned down by the Marvelettes. Gladys recalls "When they played 'Where Did Our Love Go' they played 'Too Many Fish in the Sea'. We picked 'Too Many Fish in the Sea' because it had all the music and all the bongos. We were all together and said at the same time we didn't want 'Where Did Our Love Go'."

That year, the Marvelettes hit the top forty with the Norman Whitfield production, "Too Many Fish in the Sea", reaching number 25 on the Hot 100 with the recording. By now Motown had begun its charm school, hiring choreographer Cholly Atkins and etiquette expert Maxine Powell to refine the label's acts. Atkins began polishing the Marvelettes' dance moves, while Powell taught the group to be more graceful, telling them and every other Motown act that they would "perform in front of kings and queens". Meanwhile, two of the Marvelettes got married: Georgeanna Tillman to longtime boyfriend Billy Gordon of the Contours, and Wanda Young to longtime boyfriend Bobby Rogers of the Miracles, changing her name to Wanda Rogers. By the end of 1964, Georgeanna Tillman, a longtime sufferer of sickle cell anemia, was diagnosed with lupus. By early 1965, struggling to keep up with their stringent recording sessions and touring schedules and her illnesses, a doctor of Tillman's advised her to leave performing for good. The remaining Marvelettes carried on as a trio from then on.

In mid-1965, Wanda Rogers took over as lead vocalist, as Motown producers felt Rogers' voice was more suitable for this role than Horton's. With Rogers as lead, the group had a hit with "I'll Keep Holding On", which reached number 34 while "Danger Heartbreak Dead Ahead" settled for a number 61 showing but was number 11 on the R&B chart. Later in 1965, the group released the Smokey Robinson composition, "Don't Mess with Bill", which brought the group back to the top ten, reaching number 7 and becoming their second single to sell over a million copies. From then on, with Robinson mainly in charge, most of the Marvelettes singles would feature Rogers on lead. In 1966, they had a modest success with "You're the One" and by the end of that year, they reached the top 20 with "The Hunter Gets Captured by the Game", also composed by Robinson. In 1967, the group recorded the Van McCoy composition, "When You're Young and in Love", which had been originally recorded by Ruby & the Romantics. The song reached number 23 in the U.S. and peaked at number 13 on the UK Singles Chart, becoming their only British hit.

=== Decline ===
By 1967, Gladys Horton had reconsidered her involvement with the Marvelettes. After her first child, Sammie, was born with cerebral palsy, Horton decided to leave the group entirely, doing so before the release of the hit "My Baby Must Be a Magician". The song peaked at number 17 and was noted for featuring the Temptations' Melvin Franklin providing the opening line. With Horton out, Harvey Fuqua introduced the group to Ann Bogan who became Horton's replacement. However, by the time Bogan joined the group in 1968, most of the musicians of Motown's early years had left, mainly due to financial disputes with the label. The group struggled with recordings after the release of "Magician", with Motown offering little to no promotion. The 1968 singles "Here I Am Baby" and "Destination: Anywhere" were only modestly successful, peaking at number 44 and number 63 respectively. The release of their 1969 album, In Full Bloom, failed as did its only single, the remake of Justine Washington's "That's How Heartaches Are Made".

Wanda Rogers, who had suffered from a number of personal problems for some time, became unreliable and difficult to work with, as she was taking charge of the group. Concert scheduling was difficult as she sometimes failed to show up for performances. In August 1969 at the University of Detroit, Elizabeth Woods stood in for Wanda, with Katherine and Ann. This was likely one of the last live performances of the Marvelettes.

In 1970, Rogers recorded songs for a solo album, produced by Smokey Robinson, including covers of earlier Motown recordings. Due to the lack of Rogers having marketing value in her name, Motown decided to market as The Return of The Marvelettes. As this album featured no other Marvelettes, original member Katherine Anderson refused to participate in appearing on the cover of the album due to what she felt was Motown's disrespect towards her and the group. The album was a modest hit, reaching number 50 on the R&B albums chart and featured no charted hit singles. Following this, the group disbanded with Katherine Anderson settling briefly as a staff writer for Motown. After Motown moved to Los Angeles in 1972, Anderson and Rogers left the business altogether, returning to Michigan with Anderson moving with her husband, Joe Schaffner, to Las Vegas, while Rogers settled back in Inkster. Meanwhile, Gladys Horton had moved to Los Angeles where she raised her three sons.

=== Later years ===
In January 1980, former Marvelette and original member Georgeanna Tillman died from complications of lupus, in her mother's house in Inkster, at the age of 36. Shortly afterwards, on February 17, 1987, several of the former members filed suit against Motown, complaining of not receiving any royalties from their work. In 1989, Gladys Horton tried to reunite the original Marvelettes after being offered a contract with Ian Levine's Motorcity Records. Wanda Young was the only other Marvelette to agree to sing on the recording, an album titled The Marvelettes...Now!. The Marvelettes released the single "Holding On with Both Hands" in 1990, which was sung on record by Young but performed by Horton in public due to Young's severe personal problems. Following this, Horton continued to perform, sometimes as "Gladys Horton of the Marvelettes". Due to a legal disagreement with Larry Marshak, who bought the Marvelettes' name from Motown after the label lost rights to the name, Horton would fight for years to retain ownership of the name. Marshak had several groups billing themselves as "the Marvelettes", but the women who portrayed themselves as the Marvelettes were much younger than the original line-up, and had not recorded on any of the Marvelettes' original Motown hits.

By 2006, thanks to the efforts of former Supremes singer Mary Wilson, legislation had been launched in 33 states via the Truth In Music Act to prevent performers from using the name of a group that didn't have at least one original member, causing the groups who Marshak had hired as Marvelettes to bill themselves as "Tribute to the Marvelettes". Both Horton and Katherine Anderson began fighting to get back ownership of the name and were in their final stages of having the name returned to them when Horton died from a stroke at a California nursing home in January 2011. Following their exits from the Marvelettes, both Georgia Dobbins and Juanita Cowart remained in Inkster and settled into life outside the entertainment industry, with Cowart being active in her Inkster church choir. Katherine Anderson lived in Inkster, mentoring several Detroit-area vocal groups. Ann Bogan, the latter-day member of the group, now lives in Cleveland, Ohio and became a part of the New Birth and their subgroup, Love, Peace & Happiness, before retiring to raise her children. All the surviving members of the group at that time, including Dobbins and Rogers, were interviewed for an episode of their lives on the TV-One show, Unsung.

In 2017, Anderson briefly formed her spin-off of the Marvelettes with three other singers and began performing again. One of their performances was at Motown A Go Go in Detroit. Georgia Dobbins died of cardiac arrest in Inkster on September 18, 2020, at age 78. Wanda Rogers died from chronic obstructive pulmonary disease on December 15, 2021, at age 78. Katherine Anderson died of heart failure on September 20, 2023, at age 79. Ann Bogan, who replaced Gladys Horton in 1967, died on August 6, 2026. As of mid-2026, Juanita Cowart Motley (born in 1944) is the only surviving member of the group.

== Musical style ==
AllMusic said they were "probably the most pop-oriented of Motown's major female acts" before moving to a style more in the vein of the label's usual artists.

== Legacy ==
In 2005, the group was awarded two Gold plaques for their biggest hits, "Please Mr. Postman" and "Don't Mess with Bill" after the RIAA had certified the singles as million-sellers. The following year, Horton appeared on the PBS and T.J. Lubinsky concert special, Motown Memories (My Music), along with other Motown stars from the label's early years. Some of the group's recordings were later sampled for songs by rap musicians, most notably Jay-Z's song, "Poppin' Tags", sampled the group's 1970 cover of Smokey Robinson's composition, "After All", from his 2002 album, The Blueprint 2: The Gift & The Curse.

In 1995, they were honored with the "Pioneer Award" at the Rhythm & Blues Foundation. In 2004, the group was inducted to the Vocal Group Hall of Fame. In 2006, Marc Taylor issued the biography, The Original Marvelettes: Motown's Mystery Girl Group. The group's story had been documented several years before in Goldmine magazine from a 1984 article.

In 2007, the Marvelettes were voted into the Michigan Rock and Roll Legends Hall of Fame.

In 2009, as part of Motown's 50th Anniversary celebrations, a new limited-edition triple-CD set on the group entitled The Marvelettes: Forever – The Complete Motown Albums Vol. 1 was released. This featured the group's first six albums, some of which had never been released on CD. The Marvelettes: Forever More – The Complete Motown Albums Vol. 2, which included their later albums and bonus material, was released in 2011. Their often covered million selling number one hit "Please Mr Postman" was inducted into the Grammy Hall of Fame in 2011.

The Marvelettes were nominated for 2013 induction into the Rock and Roll Hall of Fame. They became eligible for induction in 1987. Although they did not garner enough votes for induction, they made the ballot a second time for induction in the year 2015.

On August 17, 2013 the Marvelettes were inducted into the Rhythm and Blues Music Hall of Fame in Cleveland and again in June 2017 in Detroit, Michigan. As of 2026, the rights to the group's name is owned by Gladys Horton's son Vaughn Horton and the estate of Katherine Schaffner.

== Members ==
- Gladys Horton - lead vocals (1960–1967; died 2011)
- Georgia Dobbins - lead vocals (1960–1961; died 2020)
- Katherine Anderson - vocals (1960–1969; died 2023)
- Georgeanna Tillman - vocals (1960–1965; died 1980)
- Juanita Cowart - vocals (1960–1963)
- Wanda Young - lead vocals (1961–1971; died 2021)
- Ann Bogan - lead vocals (1967–1969; died 2026)

== Discography ==
=== Albums ===
| Year | Album | Peak chart positions | |
| Year | Album | US Pop | US R&B |
|---|---|---|---|
| 1961 | Please Mr. Postman | — | — |
| 1962 | The Marvelettes Sing (aka Smash Hits of '62) | — | — |
| 1962 | Playboy | — | — |
| 1963 | The Marvelous Marvelettes | — | — |
| 1963 | The Marvelettes Recorded Live on Stage | — | — |
| 1966 | The Marvelettes Greatest Hits | 84 | 4 |
| 1967 | The Marvelettes (Pink Album) | 129 | 13 |
| 1968 | Sophisticated Soul | — | 41 |
| 1969 | In Full Bloom | — | — |
| 1970 | The Return of the Marvelettes | — | 50 |
| 1975 | The Marvelettes Anthology | — | — |
| 1975 | Best of the Marvelettes | — | — |
| 1986 | 23 Greatest Hits | — | — |
| 1990 | The Marvelettes Now | — | — |
| 1998 | The Ultimate Collection | — | — |
| 2000 | 20th Century Masters - The Millennium Collection: The Best Of | — | — |
| 2009 | The Definitive Collection | — | — |
| 2009 | Forever - The Complete Motown Albums Vol 1 (3 CD) | — | — |
"—" denotes releases that did not chart

=== Singles ===
| Year | Titles (A-side, B-side) Both sides from same album except where indicated | Peak chart positions | | | | Certification | Album |
| Year | Titles (A-side, B-side) Both sides from same album except where indicated | US Pop | US R&B | CAN | UK | Certification | Album |
|---|---|---|---|---|---|---|---|
| 1961 | "Please Mr. Postman" (Tamla 54046) b/w "So Long Baby" | 1 | 1 | — | — | US: Gold; UK: Gold | Please Mr. Postman |
| 1961 | "Twistin' Postman" (54054) b/w "I Want a Guy" (from Please Mr. Postman) | 34 | 13 | — | — | | The Marvelettes Smash Hits of '62 |
| 1962 | "Playboy" (54060) b/w "All the Love I've Got" (from Please Mr. Postman) | 7 | 4 | 6 | — | | Playboy |
| 1962 | "Beechwood 4-5789" (54065) / | 17 | 7 | 9 | — | | Playboy |
| 1962 | "Someday, Someway" (54065) | — | 8 | — | — | | Playboy |
| 1962 | "Strange I Know" (54072) b/w "Too Strong to be Strung Along" | 49 | 10 | — | — | | The Marvelous Marvelettes |
| 1963 | "Locking Up My Heart" (54077) / | 44 | 25 | 20 | — | | The Marvelous Marvelettes |
| 1963 | "Forever" (54077) | 78 | 24 | — | — | | Playboy |
| 1963 | "My Daddy Knows Best" (54082) b/w "Tie a String Around Your Finger" (Non-album track) | 67 | — | — | — | | The Marvelous Marvelettes |
| 1963 | "As Long as I Know He's Mine" (54088) b/w "Little Girl Blue" (Non-album track) | 47 | 3* | — | — | | The Marvelettes' Greatest Hits |
| 1963 | "Too Hurt to Cry, Too Much in Love to Say Goodbye" (as The Darnells) (Gordy 7024) b/w "Come on Home" | 117 | — | — | — | | Non-album tracks |
| 1964 | "He's a Good Guy (Yes He Is)" (54091) b/w "Goddess of Love" (from Playboy) | 55 | 18* | — | — | | Anthology |
| 1964 | "You're My Remedy" (54097) b/w "A Little Bit of Sympathy, A Little Bit of Love" (Non-album track) | 48 | 16* | — | — | | The Marvelettes' Greatest Hits |
| 1964 | "Too Many Fish in the Sea" (54105) b/w "A Need for Love" (Non-album track) | 25 | 5* | — | — | | The Marvelettes' Greatest Hits |
| 1965 | "I'll Keep Holding On" (54116) b/w "No Time for Tears" (Non-album track) | 34 | 11 | — | — | | Anthology |
| 1965 | "Danger Heartbreak Dead Ahead" (54120) b/w "Your Cheating Ways" (Non-album track) | 61 | 11 | — | — | | The Marvelettes' Greatest Hits |
| 1966 | "Don't Mess with Bill" (54126) b/w "Anything You Wanna Do" (Non-album track) | 7 | 3 | 70 | — | US: Gold | The Marvelettes' Greatest Hits |
| 1966 | "You're the One" (54131) b/w "Paper Boy" (Non-album track) | 48 | 20 | 49 | — | | Sophisticated Soul |
| 1967 | "The Hunter Gets Captured by the Game" (54143) b/w "I Think I Can Change You" (from Playboy) | 13 | 2 | 22 | — | | The Marvelettes |
| 1967 | "When You're Young and in Love" (only UK charting single) (54150) b/w "The Day You Take One, You Have to Take the Other" | 23 | 9 | 19 | 13 | | The Marvelettes |
| 1968 | "My Baby Must Be a Magician" (Spoken intro by Melvin Franklin) (54158) b/w "I Need Someone" (from The Marvelettes) | 17 | 8 | 21 | — | | Sophisticated Soul |
| 1968 | "Here I Am Baby" (54166) b/w "Keep Off, No Trespassing" (from The Marvelettes) | 44 | 14 | 38 | — | | Sophisticated Soul |
| 1968 | "Destination: Anywhere" (54171) / | 63 | 28 | 66 | — | | Sophisticated Soul |
| 1968 | "What's Easy for Two Is So Hard for One" (54171) | 114 | — | — | — | | Sophisticated Soul |
| 1969 | "I'm Gonna Hold On as Long as I Can" (54177) b/w "Don't Make Hurting Me a Habit" | 76 | — | 58 | — | | Sophisticated Soul |
| 1969 | "That's How Heartaches Are Made" (54186) b/w "Rainy Mourning" | 97 | — | 87 | — | | In Full Bloom |
| 1970 | "Marionette" (54198) b/w "After All" | — | — | — | — | | The Return of the Marvelettes |
| 1972 | "A Breath-Taking Guy" (54213) b/w "You're the One for Me Bobby" (from Sophisticated Soul) | — | — | — | — | | The Return of the Marvelettes |
| 1990 | "Holding On with Both Hands" | — | — | — | — | | The Marvelettes Now |
"—" denotes releases that did not chart

(*There was no Billboard R&B Singles Chart from November 1963 to January 1965. The R&B chart numbers from that period come from Cash Box magazine, a Billboard competitor at the time.)

== Awards and recognition ==
- 1995: The Rhythm & Blues Pioneer Award (Rhythm & Blues Foundation)
- 2004: Inducted into the Vocal Group Hall of Fame
- 2005: RIAA-certified half million-selling gold records for "Please Mr. Postman" and "Don't Mess with Bill"
- 2013: Nominated for induction into the Rock & Roll Hall of Fame
- 2013: Inducted into the Rhythm and Blues Hall of Fame

== Bibliography ==
- Clemente, John (2000). Girl Groups—Fabulous Females That Rocked The World. Iola, Wisconsin. Krause Publications. pp. 276. ISBN 0-87341-816-6.
- Clemente, John (2013). Girl Groups—Fabulous Females Who Rocked The World. Bloomington, Indiana. Authorhouse Publications. pp. 623. ISBN 978-1-4772-7633-4 (sc); ISBN 978-1-4772-8128-4 (e).
