= Robert Bateman (songwriter) =

American R&B singer, songwriter and record producer (1936–2016)

Robert Bateman (April 30, 1936 – October 12, 2016) was an American R&B singer, songwriter and record producer. Among other songs, he co-wrote the hits "Please Mr. Postman" and "If You Need Me".

== Biography ==
Born in Chicago, Illinois, he was one of the founding members of vocal group the Satintones in Detroit, Michigan, in 1957. Bateman was the bass singer. In 1959, the group made their first recordings for Motown, and Bateman did additional work for the company as a backing singer and engineer. He was reportedly responsible for acquiring Motown's first recording equipment, a tape recorder discarded by radio station WJLB.

When the Satintones disbanded in 1961, after several record releases on Motown but without a hit, Bateman formed a writing and production partnership with Brian Holland, being credited as "Brianbert". They worked with Georgia Dobbins of the Marvelettes to rewrite "Please Mr. Postman", a song that had been partly written by Dobbins' friend William Garrett. Bateman and Holland then produced the Marvelettes' recording of the song, which became the first Motown song to reach the number one position on the Billboard Hot 100 pop singles chart, and was later also recorded successfully by the Beatles and the Carpenters, among others. Bateman also co-wrote and co-produced some of the Marvelettes' follow-up singles, including "Twistin' Postman" and "Playboy", and conducted the audition that led to Motown signing Mary Wells.

After leaving Motown in 1962 at the suggestion of William "Mickey" Stevenson, Bateman joined the Correc-Tone label set up in Detroit by Wilbert Golden. The following year, he moved to New York City to work for Capitol Records, and collaborated with musicians including Florence Ballard and Wilson Pickett. With Pickett and former Satintones bandmate Sonny Sanders, he co-wrote "If You Need Me", first recorded by Pickett and also a chart hit for Solomon Burke; it was later recorded by the Rolling Stones. In 1967, he co-wrote two R&B hit singles with, and for, singer Lou Courtney. He returned to work in Detroit in 1970.

In later years, he was a frequent attendee at Motown reunion events, and was inducted into the Rhythm and Blues Music Hall of Fame in Dearborn, Michigan, early in 2016. He died later that year, aged 80, following a heart attack after attending an awards ceremony in Los Angeles, California.
