= Please Mr. Postman =

1961 single by the Marvelettes

- US picture sleeve

Single by the Marvelettes

from the album Please Mr. Postman
- B-side: "So Long Baby"
- Released: August 21, 1961
- Recorded: April 1961
- Studio: Hitsville U.S.A., Detroit
- Genre: Pop; soul; doo-wop
- Length: 2:31
- Label: Tamla
- Songwriters: Georgia Dobbins; Freddie Gorman; William Garrett; Brianbert (Brian Holland & Robert Bateman)
- Producer: Brianbert

The Marvelettes singles chronology
"Please Mr. Postman" (1961)	"Twistin' Postman" (1961)

"Please Mr. Postman" is a song written by Georgia Dobbins, William Garrett, Freddie Gorman, Brian Holland and Robert Bateman. It was the debut single by girl group the Marvelettes for the Tamla (Motown) label and is famous for being the first Motown song to reach the number-one position on the Billboard Hot 100 singles chart. The single achieved this position in late 1961; it hit number one on the R&B chart as well.

The song has been covered several times, including a version by the Beatles in 1963. It became a number-one hit again in early 1975 when The Carpenters' cover of the song reached the top position of the Billboard Hot 100. The 2017 song "Feel It Still" by Portugal. The Man has significant similarities to "Please Mr. Postman" and includes a credit for Brian Holland.

== Original version ==
=== Background ===
In April 1961, the Marvelettes (then known as the Marvels) arranged an audition for Berry Gordy's Tamla label. Marvels' original lead singer Georgia Dobbins needed an original song for their audition and got a blues song from her friend William Garrett, which she then reworked for the group. Dobbins left the group after the audition and was replaced. Gordy renamed the group and hired "Brianbert" – Brian Holland and Robert Bateman's songwriting partnership – to rework the song yet again. Freddie Gorman, himself a Detroit postman and another songwriting partner of Holland (before Holland became part of the Holland–Dozier–Holland team) was also involved in the final reworking.

=== Composition and recording ===
Songwriting credits for "Please Mr. Postman" have been inconsistent. Journalist Ben Fong-Torres credits the song to Holland, Bateman, Gorman, Dobbins and Garrett. The original Tamla 45 single for the Marvelettes' version credits "Dobbins/Garrett/Brianbert" as the songwriters, and credits "Brianbert" as producer. The original With the Beatles album cover credited it to just Brian Holland (the 1987 CD release credits it to "Dobbin-Garrett-Gorman-Brianbert"). The 1976 Beatles discography book All Together Now credits the songwriting to Holland, Bateman, and Berry Gordy. The 1992 Motown boxed set Hitsville USA: The Motown Singles Collection credits Dobbins, Garrett, Holland, Bateman, and Gorman as the composers. The Songwriters Hall of Fame credits "Please Mr. Postman" to just Holland, Bateman, and Gorman. EMI Music Publishing, the current music publisher of the song, list all five writers in their catalog.

Played in 4/4 time, the song features the common I–vi–IV–V chord progression. The melody is hexatonic, avoiding "blue" notes.

The Marvelettes recording features lead singer Gladys Horton hoping that the postman has brought her a letter from her boyfriend. Holland and Bateman – dubbing themselves "Brianbert" – produced the session. The song's rhythm section is made up of piano, electric bass and drums. The commercial failure of Marvin Gaye's 1961 debut album, The Soulful Moods of Marvin Gaye, led him to spend time as a studio musician for the remainder of the year. Among these efforts was "Please Mr. Postman", on which he plays the drums. Gaye's backbeat is busy throughout the song, playing his snare on the two and four beats while tapping the ride cymbal each half beat. He uses fills to transition the song through sections. The bass mostly alternates between root and fifth chords. An electric rhythm guitar is buried in the mix, only occasionally audible, while handclaps are prominent. Musicologist Walter Everett suggests that the appearance of reverb on the lead vocal at 2:10 is possibly the result of a vocal overdub being "punched into a mismatched circuit".

=== Release ===
Motown's Tamla label released the song as a single in the US in August 1961, then on the album of the same name in November 1961. The single was a commercial success, becoming Motown's second million-selling record and its first number-one hit. The song was on the Billboard Hot 100 chart for 23 weeks, and peaked at number 1 the week of December 11, 1961. Producer Berry Gordy credited Barney Ales' PR effort with the commercial success of the song. The song's hit status left many at Motown expecting the Marvelettes to be the label's biggest act, though they failed to ever match their first effort.

[W]e were never really given our just dues as Marvelettes. For instance, we never received a gold record for "Please Mr. Postman" ... We didn't think about it much at the time, but looking back I can admit that it really wasn't fair the way the Supremes were put ahead of us in every way.

— Katherine Anderson, 1986

Journalist Ben Fong-Torres described the Marvelettes' next song, "Twistin' Postman", as a "calculated follow-up". The song's success led to an expansion in Motown's efforts, with songs like the Miracles "I'll Try Something New" and "You've Really Got a Hold on Me" following in 1962.

Fontana Records released the song as a single in the UK in November 1961.

Billboard listed the song as #22 on their 2017 list of 100 Greatest Girl Group Songs of All Time.

Rolling Stone ranked it at No. 331 on their list of "Top 500 Greatest Songs of All Time".

In 2011, The Marvelettes' version of the song was inducted into the Grammy Hall of Fame.

=== Personnel ===
According to The Complete Motown Singles – Vol. 1: 1959–1961 liner notes, except where noted:

The Marvelettes

- Gladys Horton – lead vocals
- Katherine Anderson – backing vocals, handclaps
- Wyanetta ("Juanita") Cowart – backing vocals, handclaps
- Georgeanna Tillman – backing vocals, handclaps
- Wanda Young – backing vocals, handclaps

Additional musicians

- The Funk Brothers:
  - Eddie Willis – guitar
  - Richard "Popcorn" Wylie – piano
  - James Jamerson – bass
  - Marvin Gaye – drums

=== Charts and certifications ===
==== Weekly charts ====
Weekly chart performance for "Please Mr. Postman"
Chart (1961–1962)	Peak position
New Zealand (Lever Hit Parade)	4
US Billboard Hot 100	1
US Hot R&B Sides (Billboard)	1

==== Certifications ====
Certifications for "Please Mr. Postman"
Region	Certification	Certified units/sales
New Zealand (RMNZ)	Gold	15,000^{‡}
United Kingdom (BPI) sales since 2004	Gold	400,000^{‡}
United States (RIAA)	Gold	500,000^{^}
^{^} Shipments figures based on certification alone.^{‡} Sales+streaming figures based on certification alone.

== The Beatles version ==
"Please Mr. Postman"
- Swedish single picture sleeve

Song by the Beatles

from the album With the Beatles
- Released: November 22, 1963
- Recorded: July 30, 1963
- Studio: EMI, London
- Genre: Rock and roll; R&B
- Length: 2:36
- Label: Parlophone
- Songwriter: Brian Holland
- Producer: George Martin

=== Background and recording ===
The Beatles displayed an early interest in the music of girl groups, covering songs by groups like the Shirelles, the Cookies and the Donays. They added "Please Mr. Postman" to their live repertoire in December 1961, their third Tamla song after the Miracles' "Who's Lovin' You" and Barrett Strong's "Money (That's What I Want)".

Since the original version hadn't made it into the British charts, few in the UK knew the song "Please Mr. Postman", allowing the Beatles to make it their own among all Liverpool groups. John Lennon sang lead vocal, Paul McCartney and George Harrison providing backing vocals, while all three added handclaps at their head level. In 2004, Billy Hatton of the Four Jays recalled seeing one of the Beatles' first live performances of the song, saying it was "a Wow moment. I was struck by how tight they were. As a semi-pro group, the Four Jays would take a month to start playing a new song really well." Without their knowing it at the time, the Beatles' 7 March 1962 performance of the song on BBC Radio's Here We Go was the first time any Tamla song was played over BBC radio. Beatles author Mark Lewisohn reflects: "Without even realising it (and they'd have been thrilled to know), the Beatles broke the Detroit 'Motown sound' to the British listening public."

In 1963, Beatles manager Brian Epstein approached Gordy for the rights to record several Motown songs, including "Please Mr. Postman", "You've Really Got a Hold on Me" and "Money (That's What I Want)". Rather than the industry standard of two cents, Epstein only offered one and a half cents per record sold. Gordy initially refused, only relenting two minutes before the offer was set to expire.

On 30 July 1963, the band recorded the song for their second UK album, With the Beatles. Recorded in Studio Two of EMI Recording Studios, George Martin produced the session, supported by balance engineer Norman Smith. The band recorded three takes in a similar style to their BBC performance, but found the results unsatisfactory. They altered the arrangement to sound closer to the Marvelettes' version, recording four more takes with a stop-time intro, drum breaks and a coda, the final take seven deemed "best". Due to their different vocal range from the Marvelettes, the Beatles modulate their version into A major. Between recording two takes of overdubs, the band added handclaps while Lennon double tracked his original vocal, take nine marked "best". Martin and Smith mixed the song for mono and stereo on 21 August and 29 October, respectively.

=== Release and reception ===
EMI's Parlophone label released With the Beatles in the UK on 22 November 1963, with "Please Mr. Postman" sequenced as the final track on the first side, coming after "Till There Was You". In the US, Capitol released The Beatles' Second Album on 10 April 1964, with "Please Mr. Postman" sequenced as the ninth track, between "I Call Your Name" and "I'll Get You". Both releases credit the song only to Holland. Capitol also included the cover as the final track on the US-only four-song EP, Four by the Beatles, released 11 May 1964.

Writing about The Beatles' Second Album, music critic Robert Christgau considers the covers of "Please Mr. Postman" and "Money (That's What I Want)" as two of the Beatles' best ever recordings, "both surpassing the superb Motown originals". Music critic Tim Riley calls the song's beat "tremendous", and that "like all great rock 'n' roll, it sounds perilously close to falling apart at any minute". He writes it is the "most reckless and completely irresistible playing" on the first side of With the Beatles, and "the most flammable rock 'n' roll they've given us since "She Loves You".

Musicologist Alan W. Pollack sees the opening shout of "Wait!" as anticipating as the opening shout of "Help!" in the Beatles' 1965 song of the same name. Writer Chris Ingham calls the song "a dense curtain of guitars and harmonies" supported by "a delicious, elastic groove". Writer Jonathan Gould writes that Lennon's strong vocal overpowers the weak lyric, while the band's backing "[explodes] off the record", ultimately "[epitomizing] all that is best about the Beatles' second album." He further writes that, among the covers on With the Beatles, it is the only one that approaches the quality of "Twist and Shout" from Please Please Me. Writer Ian MacDonald dismisses the cover as "[l]acking the loose-limbed playfulness of the original", with a "wall of sound that quickly weights on the ear".

=== Personnel ===
According to MacDonald, except where noted:

- John Lennon – double-tracked vocal, rhythm guitar
- Paul McCartney – backing vocal, bass
- George Harrison – backing vocal, lead guitar
- Ringo Starr – drums
- uncredited (played by the Beatles) – handclaps

== The Carpenters version ==
"Please Mr. Postman"

Single by Carpenters

from the album Horizon
- B-side: "This Masquerade"
- Released: November 8, 1974 (US); November 29, 1974 (UK)
- Recorded: September 1974
- Genre: Pop
- Length: 2:50
- Label: A&M 1646
- Songwriters: Georgia Dobbins, William Garrett, Freddie Gorman, Brian Holland, Robert Bateman
- Producers: Richard and Karen Carpenter

Carpenters singles chronology
"I Won't Last a Day Without You" (1974)	"Please Mr. Postman" / "This Masquerade" (1974)	"Santa Claus Is Comin' to Town" (1974)

Audio
- "Please Mr. Postman - Carpenters" on YouTube

"Please Mr. Postman" was recorded by The Carpenters, and their version went to number one on the Billboard Hot 100 chart in early 1975. The Carpenters' version resembles an old 1950s rock & roll song. The single was released in late 1974, reached number one on both the Billboard Hot 100 and Easy Listening charts in January 1975, and was the duo's tenth and final million-selling single. The corresponding Horizon album was belatedly released in June 1975 and went Platinum. It also became Carpenters' third and final number one and eleventh top-ten single in the Billboard Hot 100.

The Carpenters' cover version was also sampled by rapper Juelz Santana for his single "Oh Yes". It is used by the Rob, Arnie and Dawn Show to introduce their Listener Mail segment, and was the song by the presenters of the British Saturday morning show SMTV Live to introduce the mailbag section. Reaching number two in the UK Singles Chart in 1975, in a UK television special on ITV in 2016 it was voted number one in The Nation's Favourite Carpenters Song.

A music video of the song, filmed in Disneyland, can be found on the DVD Gold: Greatest Hits (released in 2002), originally packaged as Yesterday Once More (released on VHS and LaserDisc in 1985).

=== Personnel ===
- Karen Carpenter – lead and backing vocals, drums
- Richard Carpenter – backing vocals, piano, orchestration
- Tony Peluso – guitar
- Joe Osborn – bass guitar
- Bob Messenger – tenor saxophone
- Doug Strawn – baritone saxophone
- Uncredited – castanets, tubular bells

=== Charts ===
==== Weekly charts ====
Chart (1974–1975)	Peak position
Australia (Kent Music Report)	1
Canada Adult Contemporary (RPM)	1
Canada Top Singles (RPM)	1
Ireland (IRMA)	2
Japan (Oricon International Singles Chart	1
Japan (Oricon Singles Chart)	11
Netherlands (Single Top 100)	29
New Zealand (Recorded Music NZ)	4
Quebec (ADISQ)	2
South Africa (Springbok)	1
Switzerland (Schweizer Hitparade)	5
UK Singles (Official Charts)	2
US Billboard Hot 100	1
US Adult Contemporary (Billboard)	1
US Cash Box Top 100	1
US Radio Active Airplay Singles (Cash Box)	1
West Germany (GfK)	10

==== Year-end charts ====
Chart (1975)	Rank
Australia (Kent Music Report)	7
Canada (RPM)	11
New Zealand	34
South Africa	10
UK	28
US Billboard Hot 100	33
US Cash Box Top 100	21

==== Certifications ====
Region	Certification	Certified units/sales
Canada (Music Canada)	Gold	75,000^{^}
New Zealand (RMNZ)	Gold	15,000^{‡}
United Kingdom (BPI)	Silver	250,000^{^}
United States (RIAA)	Gold	1,000,000^{^}
^{^} Shipments figures based on certification alone.^{‡} Sales+streaming figures based on certification alone.

== See also ==
- List of Billboard Hot 100 number-one singles of 1961
- List of number-one R&B singles of 1961 (U.S.)
- List of number-one singles in Australia during the 1970s
- List of RPM number-one singles of 1975
- List of Billboard Hot 100 number-one singles of 1975
- List of number-one adult contemporary singles of 1975 (U.S.)
