= Richard "Popcorn" Wylie =

American R&B and soul singer-songwriter and musician (1939–2008)

Background information
- Also known as: Popcorn Wylie
- Born: Richard Wayne Wylie; June 6, 1939; Detroit, Michigan, U.S.
- Died: September 7, 2008 (aged 69) Detroit
- Genres: R&B, soul
- Occupations: Pianist, songwriter, record producer
- Instrument: Piano
- Years active: 1959–1990s
- Labels: Motown; Epic; Pameline others
- Formerly of: Popcorn and the Mohawks

Richard Wayne Wylie (June 6, 1939 – September 7, 2008), often known as Popcorn Wylie, was an American pianist, bandleader, songwriter, occasional singer, and record producer who was influential in the early years of Motown Records and was later known for his work on many records in the Northern soul genre.

== Life and career ==
Wylie was born in Detroit, Michigan, into a musical family, and learned piano. He gained the nickname "Popcorn" through his habit of popping quickly out of the football team's huddle at Northwestern High School. While at school, he formed a group, Popcorn and the Mohawks, which also included later Motown musicians and producers James Jamerson, Clifford Mack, Eddie Willis, Mike Terry, Lamont Dozier, and Norman Whitfield. The band performed at local venues, where Wylie would front the band wearing a homemade Mohawk headdress.

In 1960, he released a solo single, "Pretty Girl", on the local Northern label. He also performed at a Detroit club, Twenty Grand, where he met fellow musician Robert Bateman who was working as an engineer at Berry Gordy's fledgling Motown label. Wylie then began recording for Motown, releasing three unsuccessful singles as Popcorn and the Mohawks: "Custer's Last Man" / "Shimmy Gully", followed by a cover of Barrett Strong's "Money (That's What I Want)", and then "Real Good Lovin'". He also recorded with Janie Bradford as a duo, Janard, and began working as a backing musician. He played piano on The Miracles' 1961 hit "Shop Around" and The Marvelettes' "Please Mr. Postman", and additionally worked with The Contours, Marvin Gaye, Marv Johnson, The Supremes, Martha & the Vandellas and Mary Wells. He was Motown's first head of A&R, and served as the band leader for the first Motortown Revue tour in 1962.

In 1962 he left Motown after a disagreement with Gordy, who failed to mention him in his later autobiography. Wylie signed with Epic Records, releasing four singles between 1962 and 1964 on which he was reputedly backed by Sun Ra and members of his Arkestra. He later freelanced as a songwriter, producer, and session player for various local labels, including SonBert, Ric-Tic, Correc-tone, Continental and Golden World. He also formed his own labels, Pameline (an amalgamation of his daughters' names) and SoulHawk, in 1966. During this period he worked extensively with singers Edwin Starr and J.J. Barnes, and co-wrote Jamo Thomas' minor hit "I Spy (For the FBI)". Several of the records with which he was involved, including "The Cool Off" by the Detroit Executives, first issued in 1967, and "Nothing No Sweeter Than Love" by Carl Carlton, later became favourites of the Northern soul scene in the UK. He also co-wrote The Platters' 1967 hit, "With This Ring".

He began recording again, under the name Popcorn Wylie, in 1968, releasing "Rosemary, What Happened?" - another Northern soul favourite - on the Karen label, and "Move Over Babe (Here Comes Henry)" on Carla. In 1971, he briefly returned to Motown, and released his most successful solo single, "Funky Rubber Band", on their subsidiary Soul label. An instrumental, it reached # 40 on the Billboard R&B chart and # 109 on the US pop chart. He recorded an album, Extrasensory Perception, for ABC Records in 1974, working with arrangers McKinley Jackson and Gene Page. Two singles were released from the album in 1975, "Lost Time" and "Georgia's After Hours".

For some years, Wylie was unaware of the popularity of his earlier records on the UK Northern soul scene, and he reportedly allowed his children to play frisbee with highly collectable singles he had produced and released. In the mid-1980s, he finally travelled to the UK to promote his work, helping to put together compilation albums and working with producer Ian Levine. He recorded "Love is My Middle Name" and "See This Man in Love" for Levine's Motorcity label, and co-wrote songs for fellow Motown veterans The Contours and The Elgins, among others. A selection of his recordings on the Pameline label was issued on a compilation, Popcorn's Detroit Soul Party, in 2002, and he also took part in a 2003 documentary, The Strange World of Northern Soul.

== Death ==
He died at home in Detroit in 2008, aged 69, after suffering from congestive heart problems for some time.
