= Inkster High School =

Public school

Coordinates: 42.2859°N 83.3302°W

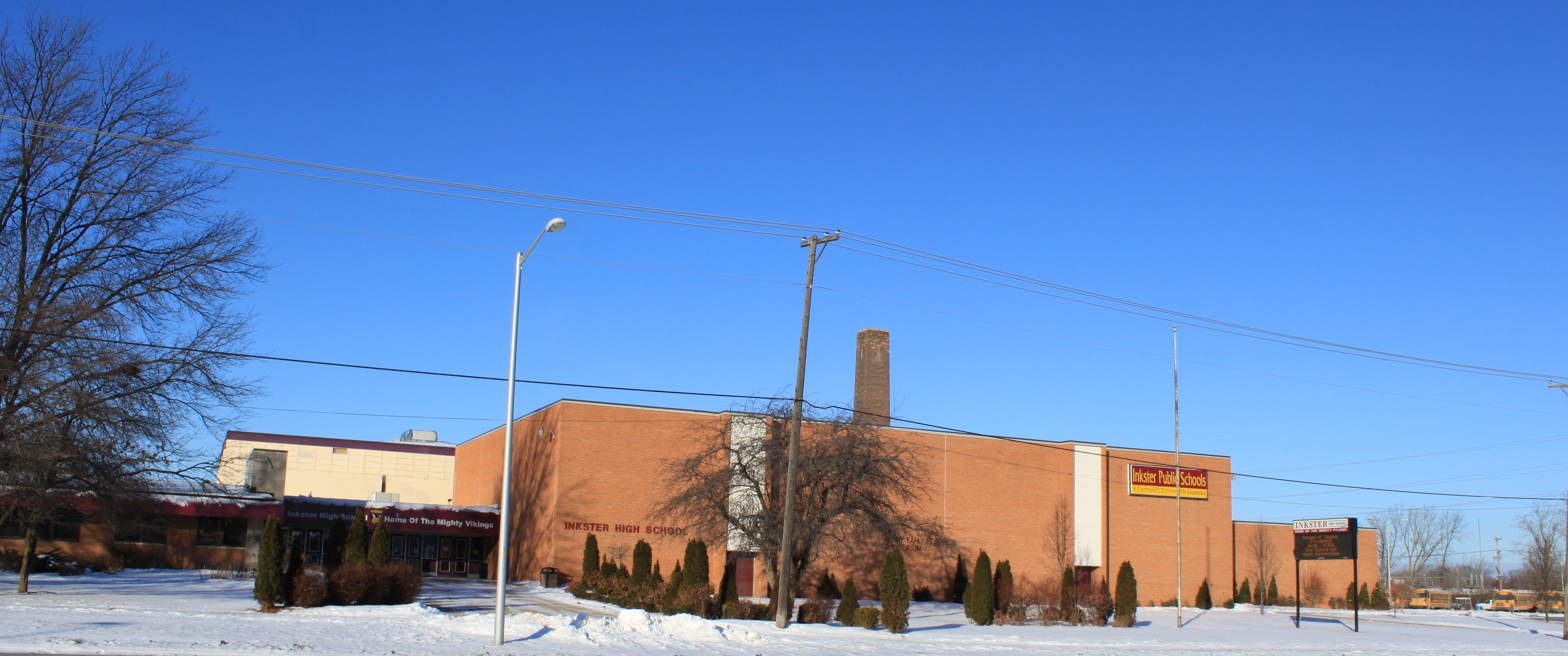
Inkster High School - 2011

Inkster High School was a high school in Inkster, Michigan in Metro Detroit. It was a part of Inkster Public Schools.

== History ==
Inkster High School on Middlebelt was built in 1952.

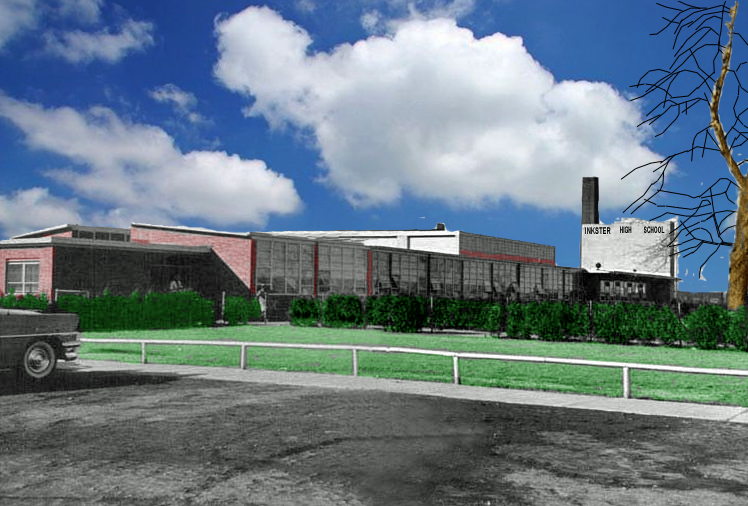
Inkster High School - 1952

In 2013 the school had 940 students.

It closed in 2013 when the Inkster district was dissolved. Everett Cook of the Michigan Daily stated in October 2013 that due to the litter of materials on the sports fields, "Officially, the school has been shut down for three months, but it looks like it's been abandoned for years, as if one day Inkster was operating, and the next everyone picked up and left."

Areas were given to the new districts by quadrants. Students north of Michigan Avenue and west of Middlebelt were rezoned to Wayne-Westland Community School District. Students north of Michigan Avenue and east of Middlebelt were rezoned to Robichaud High School in the Westwood Community School District. Students south of Michigan Avenue and west of Middlebelt were rezoned to Romulus High School in the Romulus Community School District. Students south of Michigan and east of Middlebelt were rezoned to the Taylor School District.

It was demolished in 2015.

== Athletics ==
The mascot of Inkster High School was a Viking. They were boys class B state track champions in 1975.

== Notable alumni ==
- Devin Gardner, professional football - Transferred from University of Detroit Jesuit High School to Inkster in November during his second (sophomore) year.
- The Marvelettes, R&B singing trio in Vocal Group Hall of Fame In 2013-2016 The Marvelettes were inducted into National Rhythm & Blues Hall of Fame.
- Crystal Bradford, Professional women's basketball player.
- Leon Wagner, Major League Baseball player in the 1960s.
