= Juanita Cowart =

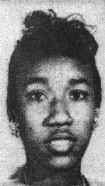
- Cowart's Inkster High School yearbook photo

Background information
- Born: January 8, 1944 (age 82); Rockport, Mississippi, US
- Origin: Inkster, Michigan, US
- Occupation: singer
- Formerly of: The Marvelettes

Juanita Cowart-Motley (sometimes referred to as Wyanetta) is a retired American singer, famous for being a member of the Motown Records quintet, The Marvelettes.

== Biography ==
Cowart was born January 8, 1944, in Rockport, Mississippi; she and her family later relocated to Inkster, Michigan. As the eldest daughter in her family, she was influenced by singers such as Mahalia Jackson, Billie Holiday, and Sarah Vaughan. While attending Inkster High School, she helped form the girl group The Casinyets, which later became The Marvels, and then, The Marvelettes.

Cowart can be heard on The Marvelettes "Please Mr. Postman", which became a Number One Hit on the Billboard Charts and notably Motown's first number one hit. Due to stress of touring and after an embarrassing statement she made on Dick Clark's American Bandstand, Cowart left the group in 1963.

After leaving the Marvelettes, Cowart earned her high school diploma after dropping out of high school to tour, married Larry Motley, and became active in church activities and in her Inkster community. Following the death of Ann Bogan in August 2026, Cowart-Motley became the last surviving member of The Marvelettes.
