= Wanda Young =

American singer (1943–2021)

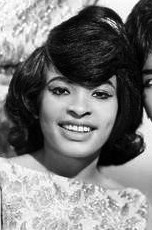
- Young in 1963

Background information
- Also known as: Wanda Rogers; Wanda Young Rogers
- Born: August 9, 1943; Inkster, Michigan, U.S.
- Died: December 15, 2021 (aged 78) Garden City, Michigan, U.S.
- Genres: R&B; soul; pop
- Occupation: Singer
- Instrument: Vocals
- Years active: 1960–1970

Wanda LaFaye Young (August 9, 1943 – December 15, 2021), was an American singer, known for being a member of the Motown all-female singing group the Marvelettes, and after 1965, the lead singer.

== Biography ==
=== Early life ===
Young was born and raised in Inkster, Michigan and was one of ten children. Her father, James Young, worked at the Ford plant, while her mother Beatrice was a housewife. Originally aspiring to be a nurse while attending nursing school, Young's professional music career started after fellow Inkster High School classmate Gladys Horton asked her to audition for a spot left by Georgia Dobbins. Dobbins' father had forbidden her to sing secular music. At this point the band had no name, having formerly been called the Casinyets (a contraction of "can't sing yet").

=== The Marvelettes ===
After a successful audition, Young joined the group and the quintet, which had auditioned for a deal with Motown earlier, returned with a song co-written by Dobbins titled "Please Mr. Postman". Impressed with the group's sound, Berry Gordy immediately signed them, and named them "the Marvelettes". After the song was remastered, the song was released and became Motown's first No. 1 Pop single in late 1961—it also held the top slot for seven weeks on Billboard's R&B chart. Young sang lead on the B-side of the single on a ballad, "So Long, Baby". In 1963, the Beatles recorded "Please Mr. Postman" on their second studio album With the Beatles. In 1975, the Carpenters' remake of "Please Mr. Postman" hit No. 1 around the world and was one of a dozen million-selling Gold-certified singles for the duo in the United States. It was also the second song to ever hit No. 1 by two different artists.

Horton was the main vocalist for their initial hit, but as the oldest member of the group, Young became their main voice and front woman. While Young sang co-lead on the Marvelettes' single "Locking Up My Heart", the first hit single to feature her on lead was the dance hit, "I'll Keep Holding On". From then on until the Marvelettes' departure, Young became the main lead vocalist of the group. She went on to sing lead on several classics such as "Don't Mess with Bill" (a million-selling gold 45), "The Hunter Gets Captured by the Game", "When You're Young and in Love" and "My Baby Must Be a Magician".

A moment of misjudgement in 1964 changed the fortunes of the band. They turned down the offer to sing "Where Did Our Love Go", and the song was instead given to the Supremes, while the Marvelettes recorded Too Many Fish in the Sea. This song only got to 25 in the charts, while "Where Did Our Love Go" was an instant hit.

The Marvelettes' hit making days had waned by the end of the 1960s and in 1970 the group disbanded. In 1970, Wanda recorded a solo album with Smokey Robinson serving as her producer. Sensing marketing value as a Marvelettes release, Motown released the album as The Return of the Marvelettes. The other Marvelettes refused to participate for the album cover and the album flopped. Young left the label in 1972 when the Motown label relocated from Detroit to Los Angeles.

=== Life after the Marvelettes ===
After leaving the Marvelettes, Young, for many years, suffered from substance abuse and alcoholism. This was largely due to the shooting death of her sister at the Young family's Inkster residence and that her brother was injured in a shooting accident. Also, she separated from her husband and lost custody of their children. In 1989, she re-emerged after accepting an offer from Motorcity Records' Ian Levine to record new songs and revised versions of her classics with the Marvelettes. Levine had invited a number of former Motown artists, one of whom reported that she looked like a "decrepit mess". Another former Motown artist, Kim Weston, encouraged her and helped rise above her problems to make her comeback. She made a brief return to performing in the early 1990s, with Gladys Horton and without Katherine Anderson. Anderson retired from show business after the Marvelettes' breakup though both Horton and Young collaborated on a Marvelettes recording for Motorcity Records. They released an album called The Marvelettes Now!, the artwork of which was modeled after their pink, 1967 album, and featured both Young and Horton on the cover. The Marvelettes were nominated for induction into the Rock & Roll Hall Of Fame in 2013 and again in 2015.

=== Personal life and death ===
Young was married once and had four children. After Young's first daughter was born, Florence Ballard of the Supremes substituted for her in the Marvelettes in 1962. On December 18, 1963, Young married her longtime boyfriend Bobby Rogers, a member of the Miracles, in Detroit. The union produced two children; son Robert III and daughter Bobbae. Wanda and Bobby divorced in 1975 after 12 years of marriage.

On February 17, 2015, Young's biological daughter Miracle Rogers, adopted and raised by a sister of Young, was murdered with a friend in Inkster, Michigan. Rogers was born on August 27, 1982, seven years after Young and Miracles' singer Bobby Rogers got divorced. Although her paternity is unknown, she received Rogers' last name, even though he was remarried by the time she was conceived.

Young died from chronic obstructive pulmonary disease in Garden City, Michigan on December 15, 2021, at the age of 78.
