= Gladys Horton =

American singer (1945–2011)

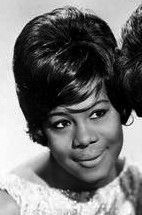
- Horton in 1963
- Born: Gladys Catherine Horton; May 30, 1945 (Note: Some sources give 1944, or 1945 as Horton's birth year.); Gainesville, Florida, U.S.
- Died: January 26, 2011 (aged 65); Los Angeles, California, U.S.
- Resting place: Forest Lawn Memorial Park, Hollywood Hills, California, U.S.
- Children: 3
- Musical career
- Genres: Rhythm and blues; rock and roll; pop
- Occupation: Singer
- Instrument: Vocals
- Years active: 1960–2006

Gladys Catherine Horton (May 30, 1945 – January 26, 2011) was an American R&B and pop singer, notable for being the founder and lead singer of the all-female vocal group the Marvelettes, the first successful Motown girl group.

== Biography ==
=== Early life ===
Born in Gainesville, Florida to parents of West Indies heritage, she was raised in the western Detroit suburb of Inkster, Michigan by a foster family in a housing project built by Henry Ford. Horton never knew her biological parents throughout her life, and lived with several foster families after being put up for adoption at nine months old. By the time of her high school years at Inkster High School, Horton had taken a strong interest in singing, joining the high school glee club. At age 14, she formed a group called the Del–Rhythmetts with three friends, recording under a small record label called JVB Records. In 1960, Horton formed a group with her former highschool glee club members Georgeanna Tillman, Katherine Anderson and Juanita Cowart. She invited Georgia Dobbins to join the new group.

=== Career with the Marvelettes ===
Formerly calling themselves The Casinyets, the group auditioned for Motown after a talent show, and while the audition was successful, the group was requested to give a musical composition. After Dobbins created the composition "Please Mr. Postman", Dobbins left the group after her father refused to let her perform in the group. Dobbins, who was also the group's original lead singer, gave Horton the spotlight to be the lead vocalist, a spot Horton was not comfortable with in the beginning. The group changed their name to the Marvelettes shortly after Motown signed the act, and Dobbins was replaced by Wanda Young. In 1961, the group released "Please Mr. Postman" in 1961. The single would top the charts, peaking at No. 1 on the Billboard Hot 100, becoming Motown's first No. 1 Pop hit. Horton would later sing lead on singles such as "Playboy", "Beechwood 4-5789" and "Too Many Fish in the Sea". Horton's position as lead vocalist ended in 1965 with Wanda Young, who had replaced Dobbins, taking over from then on as lead vocalist. Horton left the group in 1967 to get married and was replaced by Ann Bogan, shortly after giving birth to her son, Sammie, who was born with cerebral palsy.

Horton and Young reunited to collaborate on the 1990 Marvelettes album for Ian Levine's Motorcity Records label titled The Marvelettes...Now!, though Young didn't take part in the group's performances. The Marvelettes released the single "Holding On With Both Hands" in 1990, which was sung on record by Young but performed by Horton in public due to Young's severe personal problems. Horton would continue to perform Marvelettes songs with various members, and this would also continue with other Marvelettes ensembles following the years. Her memoir, A Letter From the Postman: A Memoir by the Original Lead Singer of the Marvelettes, was posthumously released in 2022, co-authored with her son, Vaughn.

== Personal life and death ==
In 1967, after leaving the Marvelettes, Horton relocated to Los Angeles and married Sammie Coleman, who was a trumpeter that worked with Joe Tex and Otis Redding, but divorced afterwards. She was mother to three children: Samuel, Vaughn, and Alphonso, who was killed in a shooting incident in 1991. She briefly lived in Philadelphia and Inkster before settling back in Los Angeles in 1984 while raising her three sons.

In 2006, Horton was diagnosed with Bell's palsy after noticing a side of her face was drooping. Horton died on January 26, 2011, in a nursing home in Sherman Oaks, following several strokes and years of declining health. She was buried at the Forest Lawn Memorial Park in Los Angeles.
