= Katherine Anderson =

American singer (1944–2023)

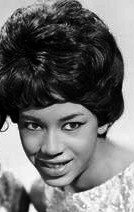
- Anderson in 1963
- Born: Katherine Elaine Anderson; January 16, 1944; Inkster, Michigan, U.S.
- Died: September 20, 2023 (aged 79); Dearborn, Michigan, U.S.
- Occupation: Singer
- Known for: Member of the Marvelettes
- Spouse: Joe Schaffner (m. 1965, divorced)

Katherine Elaine Anderson Schaffner (January 16, 1944 – September 20, 2023) was an American singer best known as a member of the Marvelettes.

== Biography ==
Anderson was born in Inkster, Michigan, United States, and was raised in a housing project built by Henry Ford. She was one of four children born to Robert, a cement finisher, and Florence Anderson, a nurse's aide. While Anderson was not able to afford records growing up, she performed in gospel groups and the high school glee club. Early in life she planned to become a legal secretary.

Anderson co-founded the Marvelettes, originally called the Casinyets, in 1960 with four fellow students at Inkster High School to enter a competition that could lead to an audition with Motown Records. Although they did not win the competition, a teacher convinced Motown to give the group an audition. The audition was successful and in August 1961 they released "Please Mr Postman" on the label which was at the top of the charts six months later. Throughout the 1960s, the Marvelettes recorded a number of other chart topping single including "Playboy", "Beachwood 45789", "Don’t Mess with Bill", and "The Hunter Gets Captured by the Game".

Following Motown's move from Detroit to Los Angeles, Anderson ceased her involvement with the record label. Anderson moved to Las Vegas with her husband Joe Schaffner, who had previously managed the Temptations, who was studying lighting at the University of Nevada. The couple had three children together. Anderson co-wrote Gladys Knight & the Pips' hit "I Don't Want to Do Wrong".

Anderson later returned to Inkster and worked with troubled teens in Detroit. She received her high school diploma at age 52, something touring had prevented her from doing in her youth. In 2005, Anderson wrote a musical based on her life story called Now That I Can Dance 1962. In 2017, she formed her version of the Marvelettes with three other singers and began doing performances.

She died in September 2023 at the age of 79 of heart failure, leaving Juanita Cowart Motley as the only surviving original member of The Marvelettes.
