= Jimmy Ruffin discography =

- Studio albums: 7
- Compilation albums: 8
- Singles: 42

This is the discography of American soul singer Jimmy Ruffin.

== Albums ==
=== Studio albums ===
Title	Album details	Peak chart positions		
Title	Album details	US	US R&B	UK
Sings Top Ten	Released: January 1967; Label: Soul, Tamla Motown; Formats: LP; Released in the UK as The Jimmy Ruffin Way	133	—	32
Ruff'n Ready	Released: March 1969; Label: Soul, Tamla Motown; Formats: LP	196	50	—
The Groove Governor	Released: September 1970; Label: Soul, Tamla Motown; Formats: LP; Released in the UK with a different track listing as Forever	—	—	—
I Am My Brother's Keeper	Released: October 1970; Label: Soul, Tamla Motown; Formats: LP; With David Ruffin	—	15	—
Jimmy Ruffin	Released: October 12, 1973; Label: Polydor; Formats: LP, MC; UK-only release	—	—	—
Love Is All We Need	Released: August 1975; Label: Polydor; Formats: LP, MC; UK-only release	—	—	—
Sunrise	Released: May 1980; Label: RSO; Formats: LP, MC	152	—	—
"—" denotes releases that did not chart or were not released in that territory.

=== Compilation albums ===
Title	Album details	Peak chart positions
Title	Album details	UK
Greatest Hits	Released: May 1974; Label: Tamla Motown; Formats: LP, MC; UK-only release	41
I've Passed This Way Before	Released: August 1974; Label: Sounds Superb; Formats: LP; UK-only release	—
20 Golden Classics	Released: August 1980; Label: Tamla Motown; Formats: LP, MC; UK-only release	—
Greatest Motown Hits	Released: August 28, 1989; Label: Tamla Motown; Formats: CD, LP, MC; Europe-only release	—
Early Classics	Released: July 1996; Label: Spectrum Music; Formats: CD; Europe-only release	—
The Best of Jimmy Ruffin	Released: November 6, 2001; Label: Motown; Formats: CD	—
The Ultimate Motown Collection	Released: January 12, 2004; Label: Motown; Formats: 2xCD; UK-only release	—
The Essential	Released: 2005; Label: Time Music; Formats: CD; Europe-only release	—
"—" denotes releases that did not chart or were not released in that territory.

== Singles ==
Title	Year	Peak chart positions								Certifications
Title	Year	US	US Dance	US R&B	AUS	CAN	IRE	NL	UK	Certifications
"Don't Feel Sorry for Me" b/w "Heart"	1961	—	—	—	—	—	—	—	—	
"Since I've Lost You" b/w "I Want Her Love"	1964	—	—	—	—	—	—	—	—	
"As Long as There Is L-O-V-E Love" b/w "How Can I Say I'm Sorry"	1965	120	—	—	—	—	—	—	—	
"What Becomes of the Brokenhearted" b/w "Baby I've Got It"	1966	7	—	6	98	12	—	—	8	
"I've Passed This Way Before" b/w "Tomorrow's Tears"	1966	17	—	10	30	8	—	—	29	
"Gonna Give Her All the Love I've Got" b/w "World So Wide Nowhere to Hide"	1967	29	—	14	—	24	—	—	26	
"Don't You Miss Me a Little Bit Baby" b/w "I Want Her Love"	1967	68	—	27	—	—	—	—	51 (Note: Chart position is from the UK "Breakers List".)	
"I'll Say Forever My Love" b/w "Everybody Needs Love"	1968	77	—	—	—	—	—	—	52	
"Don't Let Him Take Your Love from Me" b/w "Lonely Lonely Man Am I"	1968	113	—	—	—	—	—	—	—	
"Sad and Lonesome Feeling" b/w "Gonna Keep On Tryin' Till I Win Your Love"	1968	—	—	—	—	—	—	—	—	
"I've Passed This Way Before" (reissue) (Note: "I've Passed This Way Before" was only reissued in the UK and continental Europe.) b/w "Tomorrow's Tears"	1969	—	—	—	—	—	—	—	33	
"Farewell Is a Lonely Sound" b/w "If You Will Let Me I Know I Can"	1969	104	—	—	—	—	20	—	8	
"I'll Say Forever My Love" (reissue) (Note: "I'll Say Forever My Love" was only reissued in the UK, continental Europe, Australasia and South Africa.) b/w "Everybody Needs Love"	1970	—	—	—	—	—	—	—	7	
"Stand by Me" (both sides with David Ruffin) b/w "Your Love Was Worth Waiting For"	1970	61	—	24	—	78	—	—	—	
"It's Wonderful (To Be Loved by You)" b/w "Maria (You Were the Only One)"	1970	—	—	—	—	—	—	—	6	
"Maria (You Were the Only One)" b/w "Living in a World I Created for Myself"	1970	97	—	—	—	—	—	—	—	
"Let's Say Goodbye Tomorrow" (Note: "Let's Say Goodbye Tomorrow" was only released in the UK and Portugal.) b/w "Living in a World I Created for Myself"	1971	—	—	—	—	—	—	—	51	
"When My Love Hand Comes Down" (both sides with David Ruffin) b/w "Steppin' on a Dream"	1971	—	—	—	—	—	—	—	—	
"On the Way Out (On the Way In)" (Note: "On the Way Out (On the Way In)" was only released in the UK.) b/w "Honey Come Back"	1971	—	—	—	—	—	—	—	—	
"Our Favorite Melody" b/w "You Gave Me Love"	1972	—	—	—	—	—	—	—	—	
"Mother's Love" (Note: "Mother's Love" was only released in the UK and continental Europe.) b/w "Waiting on You"	1973	—	—	—	—	—	—	—	—	
"Thank You Girl" (Note: "Thank You Girl" was only released in the UK.) b/w "Do You Know Me"	1973	—	—	—	—	—	—	—	—	
"Goin' Home" b/w "Tears of Joy"	1973	—	—	—	—	—	—	—	—	
"Tell Me What You Want" b/w "Going Home" (UK) / "Do You Know Me" (US)	1974	—	—	42	—	—	—	—	39	
"What Becomes of the Brokenhearted" b/w "Don't You Miss Me a Little Bit Baby" (UK) / "Baby I've Got It" (US)	1974	—	—	—	—	—	20	—	4	BPI: Gold
"Farewell Is a Lonely Sound" (reissue) (Note: "Farewell Is a Lonely Sound" was only reissued in the UK and Germany.) b/w "I Will Never Let You Get Away"	1974	—	—	—	—	—	—	—	30	
"What You See (Ain't Always What You Get)" b/w "Boy from Mississippi"	1975	—	—	—	—	—	—	—	—	
"Give You All the Love I've Got" (Note: "Give You All the Love I've Got" was only released in the UK.) b/w "Get On Up"	1975	—	—	—	—	—	—	—	—	
"Fallin' in Love with You" b/w "Fallin' in Love with You" (instrumental)	1977	—	22	—	—	—	—	—	—	
"Hold On (To My Love)" b/w "Hold On (To My Love)" (instrumental)	1980	10	—	29	—	—	8	37	7	
"Night of Love" b/w "Searchin'" (US) / "Songbird" (UK)	1980	—	—	—	—	—	—	—	—	
"Turn to Me" (Maxine Nightingale featuring Jimmy Ruffin) b/w "Give a Little Love (To Me)" (by Maxine Nightingale)	1982	—	—	17	—	—	—	—	—	
"I'm Gonna Love You Forever" (with Jackson Moore) (Note: "I'm Gonna Love You Forever" was only released in the UK and Europe.) b/w "I'm Gonna Love You Forever" (Hi-NRG Mix)	1984	—	—	—	—	—	—	—	95	
"There Will Never Be Another You" (Note: "There Will Never Be Another You" was only released in the UK and continental Europe.) b/w "The Backstabbers"	1985	—	—	—	—	—	—	—	68	
"That's When My Loving Begins" (Note: "That's When My Loving Begins" was only released in the UK.) b/w "Don't Stop (Keep on Loving Me Girl)"	1985	—	—	—	—	—	—	—	—	
"The Foolish Thing to Do" (Heaven 17 featuring Jimmy Ruffin) (Note: "The Foolish Thing to Do" was only released in the UK, Europe and New Zealand.) b/w "My Sensitivity Gets in the Way"	1986	—	—	—	—	—	—	—	80	
"Easy Just to Say (I Love You)" (Note: "Easy Just to Say (I Love You)" was only released in the UK.) b/w "You Never Have Time (For Me)"	1987	—	—	—	—	—	—	—	—	
"Wake Me Up When It's Over" (Note: "Wake Me Up When It's Over" was only released in the UK and South Africa.) b/w "Wake Me Up When It's Over" (remix)	1988	—	—	—	—	—	—	—	—	
"What Becomes of the Brokenhearted" (Ruby Turner featuring Jimmy Ruffin) (Note: Only released in the UK, Germany and Australia.) b/w "Still Waters Run Deep" (by Ruby Turner)	1988	—	—	—	—	—	—	—	87	
"On the Rebound" (with Brenda Holloway) (Note: "On the Rebound" was only released in the UK and the Netherlands.) b/w "On the Rebound" iInstrumental)	1989	—	—	—	—	—	—	—	—	
"We Finally Found Out" (Note: "We Finally Found Out" was only released in the UK.) b/w "We Finally Found Out" (edit)	2005	—	—	—	—	—	—	—	—	
"—" denotes releases that did not chart or were not released in that territory.
