= The Marvelettes (album) =

Studio album by The Marvelettes
- Released: 1967
- Recorded: Hitsville USA; 1966–1967
- Genre: Pop; R&B; soul
- Length: 32:42
- Label: Tamla (Motown)
- Producer: Smokey Robinson; Brian Holland; Lamont Dozier; Norman Whitfield; James Dean; William Weatherspoon

The Marvelettes chronology
The Marvelettes Recorded Live Onstage (1963)	The Marvelettes (1967)	Sophisticated Soul (1968)

Singles from The Marvelettes
- 1. "The Hunter Gets Captured by the Game" Released: December 27, 1966; 2. "When You're Young and in Love" Released: April 20, 1967

Professional ratings
Review scores
Source	Rating
Allmusic	4.5/5 stars

The Marvelettes a.k.a. The Pink Album is a 1967 album by American vocal group The Marvelettes, also their seventh LP.

== Overview ==
Recording for The Pink Album began in 1966. While Smokey Robinson handled much of the production, there is also production from James Dean and William Weatherspoon, who would provide material for The Marvelettes' next album. Producers felt that the group needed to offer a sound more mature and developed that contrasted their previous recordings. This album contains only two singles: "The Hunter Gets Captured by the Game" (No.13 US, No. 2 R&B) which was written and produced by Robinson, and its follow-up, a remake of Ruby & the Romantics' "When You're Young and in Love" (No. 23 US, No. 9 R&B, No. 13 UK) which was the group's only single to reach UK charts. The Marvelettes topped out at No. 129 in the US and was more successful on the R&B chart, at No. 13.

== Track listing ==
Superscript denotes lead singer: (a) Wanda Young; (b) Gladys Horton

=== Side 1 ===
1. "Barefootin'" (Robert Parker) (Robert Parker cover) ^{a}
2. "Message to Michael" (Burt Bacharach, Hal David) (Dionne Warwick cover) ^{b}
3. "The Hunter Gets Captured by the Game" (William Robinson) ^{a}
4. "When You're Young and in Love" (Van McCoy) (Ruby & The Romantics cover) ^{a}
5. "I Know Better" (R. Dean Taylor, Norman Whitfield) ^{b}
6. "I Can't Turn Around" (Frank Wilson) ^{a}

=== Side 2 ===
1. "He Was Really Sayin' Somethin'" (Eddie Holland, William Stevenson, Norman Whitfield) (The Velvelettes cover) ^{b}
2. "The Day You Take One (You Have to Take the Other)" (William Robinson) ^{a}
3. "When I Need You" (Morris Broadnax, Clarence Paul) ^{a}
4. "Keep Off, No Trespassing" (Johnny Bristol, Robert Gordy) ^{b, a}
5. "Tonight Was Made for Love" (Thomas Jones, Robert Staunton) ^{b}
6. "I Need Someone" (James Dean, William Weatherspoon) ^{b}

== Personnel ==
- Gladys Horton – lead vocals (where indicated), backing vocals (side 1, tracks 1, 3, 4 and 6; side 2 tracks 2 and 3)
- Wanda Young – lead vocals (where indicated), backing vocals (side 1, track 2 and 5; side 2, tracks 1, 4, 5, 6)
- Katherine Anderson – backing vocals
- The Andantes – backing vocals (side 1, tracks 2–6; side 2, tracks 2–6)
- Smokey Robinson – producer
- Norman Whitfield – producer
- Brian Holland – producer
- Lamont Dozier – producer
- James Dean – producer
- William Weatherspoon – producer
- The Funk Brothers – instrumentation (all tracks)
- Detroit Symphony Orchestra – instrumentation (side 1, tracks 4 and 5; side 2, tracks 4 and 5)

== Singles history ==
- "The Hunter Gets Captured by the Game" (No. 13 US) (No. 2 R&B)
- "When You're Young and in Love" (No. 23 US) (No. 9 R&B) (No. 13 UK)
