= In Full Bloom (The Marvelettes album) =

Studio album by The Marvelettes
- Released: September 16, 1969
- Recorded: Hitsville, USA; 1966-1969
- Genre: Pop, soul
- Label: Tamla (Motown)
- Producer: James Dean; William Weatherspoon; Clay McMurray; Ivy Jo Hunter; William Stevenson; Henry Cosby; Raynard Miner

The Marvelettes chronology
Sophisticated Soul (1968)	In Full Bloom (1969)	The Return of the Marvelettes (1970)

Singles from In Full Bloom
- 1. "That's How Heartaches Are Made" Released: September 23, 1969

In Full Bloom is the ninth studio album by Motown girl-group the Marvelettes released on the Tamla record label in 1969. It was the last record to feature any Marvelettes besides Wanda Young on the cover or on vinyl. Their next (and final) album The Return of the Marvelettes was initially intended as a solo project for Young; fearing Young didn't have enough name recognition, it was changed to a Marvelettes release.

== Track listing ==
=== Side 1 ===
1. "Seeing Is Believing" (James Dean, Stephen Bowden, William Weatherspoon) - 2:57
2. "Sunshine Days" (Janie Bradford, Raynard Miner) - 3:05
3. "That's How Heartaches Are Made" (Ben Raleigh, Bob Halley) - 2:55 (Baby Washington cover)
4. "The Truth's Outside My Door" (Janie Bradford, Raynard Miner) - 2:42
5. "I Have Someone (Who Loves Me Too)" (James Dean, Paul Riser, William Weatherspoon) - 2:54
6. "Uptown" (Barry Mann, Cynthia Weil) - 2:27 (The Crystals cover)

=== Side 2 ===
1. "At Last I See Love as It Really Is" (James Dean, Stanley McMullen, William Weatherspoon) - 2:50
2. "Now Is the Time for Love" (James Dean, Stephen Bowden, William Weatherspoon) - 2:50
3. "Too Many Tears, Too Many Times" (Eugene Dozier, Ivy Jo Hunter, William Stevenson) - 3:01
4. "Rainy Mourning" (Beatrice Verdi, Ivy Jo Hunter) - 2:51
5. "Everybody Knows (But You)" (Henry Cosby, Wade Washington) - 2:48
6. "Love Silent, Love Deep" (James Dean, William Weatherspoon) - 2:58

== Singles ==
- "That's How Heartaches Are Made" b/w "Rainy Mourning", released as Tamla 54186; the song reached #97 on the US Pop Charts

== Personnel ==
- Wanda Young – lead vocals (except on "Everybody Knows (But You)")
- Katherine Anderson – backing vocals (side 1, track 6; side 2, tracks 1, 2, 4, and 6)
- Ann Bogan – lead vocals (on "Everybody Knows (But You)"); backing vocals (side 1, track 6)
- Gladys Horton – backing vocals (side 2, tracks 1, 2, 4 and 6)
- The Andantes – backing vocals (all tracks)
- The Funk Brothers – instrumentation
- Detroit Symphony Orchestra – instrumentation
- William Weatherspoon – producer (side 1, tracks 1, 5 and 6; side 2, tracks 1, 2, and 6)
- James Dean – producer (side 1, tracks 1, 5 and 6; side 2, tracks 1, 2, and 6)
- Clay McMurray – producer (side 1, track 3)
- Raynard Miner – producer (side 1, tracks 2 and 4)
- William Stevenson – producer (side 2, track 3)
- Ivy Jo Hunter – producer (side 2, tracks 3 and 4)
- Henry Cosby – producer (side 2, track 5)

== Additional credits ==
- Curtis McNair – art direction
- Ken Kim – cover design
- J. Dempknock – photography
