= Benny Gordon (disambiguation) =

Benny Gordon may also refer to:

- Benny Gordon American stock car racing driver
- Benny Gordon (singer) American soul singer

== Similar names ==
- See also Ben Gordon (disambiguation)
