= In Search of Eddie Riff =

Studio album by Andy Mackay
- Released: June 1974
- Recorded: February 1974
- Studio: Island, London
- Genre: Rock
- Label: Island (original 1974 release and 1976 re-release); Polydor (1977 reissue); EG
- Producer: Andy Mackay

Andy Mackay chronology
In Search of Eddie Riff (1974)	Resolving Contradictions (1978)

Professional ratings
Review scores
Source	Rating
Allmusic	3/5 stars
Trouser Press	(mixed)

In Search of Eddie Riff is an album by British musician Andy Mackay, first released on Island Records in 1974.

The album was released during a brief hiatus from Roxy Music's recording schedule. A first version came out in 1974, with nine tracks, the lead single being a jazz cover of "Ride of the Valkyries". Later the album was re-released with a different track listing; this is the version that was issued on all other vinyl and cassette reissues of the album. Three songs were added to the new version - the B-side "Time Regained" (edited), the 1975 single "Wild Weekend", and the new cover "The Long and Winding Road" - and two songs were removed, "Summer Sun" and "Four Legged Friend". A CD version released in 1999 contains all the songs (although the "Time Regained" B-side was not restored to its full five-minute length) with the addition of three live rehearsal tracks.

== Background ==
Mackay has said that he intended for the album to showcase his different musical interests: "classical music, Motown, fifties rock and roll instrumentals, film music, electronic effects and partly for my wife Jane, who I had recently married, country and western."

== Reception ==
Reviews were mixed, and the Trouser Press Record Guide has described it as "merely a display of his technical abilities." AllMusic, however, calls it "highly listenable" and "fun stuff from the artsy realm of serious U.K. musicians" which overall is "good background party music" with some moments of transcendent simplicity.

== Track listings ==
First version

1. "Ride of the Valkyries" (Richard Wagner; arranged by Andy Mackay)
2. "The End of the World" (Sylvia Dee, Arthur Kent)
3. "The Hour Before Dawn" (Mackay)
4. "Past, Present and Future" (Mackay)
5. "Walking the Whippet" (Mackay)
6. "Summer Sun" (Mackay)
7. "What Becomes of the Broken Hearted" (Paul Riser, James Dean, William Weatherspoon)
8. "A Four Legged Friend" (Jack Brooks)
9. "An Die Musik" (Franz Schubert; arranged by Andy Mackay)

Second version

1. "Wild Weekend" (Phil Todaro, Tom Shannon)
2. "The End of the World" (Sylvia Dee, Arthur Kent)
3. "Walking the Whippet" (Mackay)
4. "What Becomes of the Broken Hearted" (Paul Riser, James Dean, William Weatherspoon)
5. "An Die Musik" (Franz Schubert, arranged Mackay)
6. "Time Regained" (Mackay, Eno) (edited from the 7" B-side)
7. "The Hour Before Dawn" (Mackay)
8. "Pyramid of Night (Past, Present and Future)" (Mackay)
9. "The Long and Winding Road" (John Lennon, Paul McCartney)
10. "Ride of the Valkyries" (Richard Wagner, arranged Mackay)

CD version (2003)

1. "Wild Weekend"
2. "The End of the World"
3. "Walking the Whippet"
4. "What Becomes of the Brokenhearted"
5. "An Die Musik"
6. "Time Regained" (edited)
7. "The Hour Before Dawn"
8. "Pyramid of Night (Past, Present and Future)"
9. "The Long and Winding Road"
10. "Ride of the Valkyries"
11. "Summer Sun"
12. "A Four Legged Friend"
13. "Ride of the Valkyries" (live rehearsal)
14. "The Hour Before Dawn" (live rehearsal)
15. "Walking the Whippet" (live rehearsal)

== Personnel ==
- Andy Mackay - saxophone, oboe, voice
- Phil Manzanera - guitar, saxophone, treatment
- Lloyd Watson - slide guitar, guitar
- John Porter - guitar, acoustic guitar, bass guitar on "The Hour Before Dawn" and "A Four Legged Friend"
- Roger Glover - bass guitar on "Ride of the Valkyries", "The End of the World", "Past, Present and Future", "Walking the Whippet" and "What Becomes of the Broken Hearted"
- Eddie Jobson - piano on "The End of the World", "Past, Present and Future", "Summer Sun" and "A Four Legged Friend", organ on "Past, Present and Future" and "A Four Legged Friend", synthesizer, glockenspiel, violin, strings, string arrangements
- Brian Chatton - piano on "The Hour Before Dawn" and "An Die Musik", clavinet on "Ride of the Valkyries", "Past, Present and Future" and "Walking the Whippet", organ on "The Hour Before Dawn"
- Paul Thompson - percussion
- Bruce Rowland - percussion on "What Becomes of the Broken Hearted" and "An Die Musik"
- "Countess" Sadie MacKenzie: - ethereal voice

Recorded and mixed and Island Studios in February 1974. Engineer: Phill Brown. Assistant engineers: Dave Hutchins, Richard Elen, Brian Pickering.

Theo Bergstrom - photography

Additional personnel listed on 1975 re-release:

- Jane Riff
- Brian Eno

== See also ==
- 1974 in music
- 1975 in music
