= That's the Way Love Is (album) =

Studio album by Marvin Gaye
- Released: January 8, 1970
- Studios: Hitsville U.S.A., Detroit and The Sound Factory, West Hollywood
- Genres: Soul; psychedelic soul
- Length: 36:04
- Label: Tamla
- Producer: Norman Whitfield

Marvin Gaye chronology
Easy (1969)	That's the Way Love Is (1970)	Marvin Gaye and Tammi Terrell's Greatest Hits (1970)

Singles from That's The Way Love Is
- 1. "That's The Way Love Is" Released: August 4, 1969; 2. "How Can I Forget" Released: December 16, 1969

That's the Way Love Is is the tenth studio album by the soul musician Marvin Gaye, released on January 8, 1970, on the Tamla (Motown) label. Built on the success of the title track (#7 US Pop, #2 US R&B in late 1969) originally taken from M.P.G., and much like Gaye's "I Heard It Through The Grapevine" after its success, was released with intent to sell albums based on the success of one particular single (a Motown trademark). Gaye was showing signs of disillusionment from the label's powers-that-be mentality but it didn't affect the singer's performance as he gave a powerful vocal in the title track and was especially impressive with his version of The Beatles' "Yesterday". He achieved some success with a cover version of "How Can I Forget?" (originally recorded by The Temptations), which just missed out on the US Pop Top 40, making #41, and reached #18 on the R&B Charts. Its B-side, a cover of Jimmy Ruffin's "Gonna Give Her All the Love I've Got", made a separate chart entry, and peaked at #67 and #27 on the Pop and Soul Charts respectively. Gaye also recorded a version of Ruffin's "Don't You Miss Me a Little Bit Baby" for the album. The LP also features Gaye's rendition of the socially conscious tune "Abraham, Martin & John", which became a hit in the UK, peaking at #9 in June 1970. The single (and that of his duet single with Tammi Terrell titled "The Onion Song") is widely regarded as a hint of what would follow a year later with his What's Going On. He also covered The Temptations' hits "I Wish It Would Rain" and "Cloud Nine".

Professional ratings
Review scores
Source	Rating
Allmusic	3/5 stars
Rolling Stone	(mixed) link

== Track listing ==
Side One

1. "Gonna Give Her All The Love I've Got" (originally by Jimmy Ruffin) (Barrett Strong, Norman Whitfield) - 3:21
2. "Yesterday" (originally by The Beatles) (Lennon–McCartney) - 3:26
3. "Groovin'" (originally by The Young Rascals) (Eddie Brigati, Felix Cavaliere) - 2:57
4. "I Wish It Would Rain" (originally by The Temptations) (Roger Penzabene, Strong, Whitfield) - 2:50
5. "That's The Way Love Is" (originally by The Isley Brothers) (Strong, Whitfield) - 3:44
6. "How Can I Forget?" (originally by The Temptations) (Strong, Whitfield) - 2:04

Side Two

1. "Abraham, Martin & John" (originally by Dion) (Dick Holler) - 4:30
2. "Gonna Keep On Tryin' Till I Win Your Love" (originally by The Temptations) (Strong, Whitfield) - 2:46
3. "No Time for Tears" (originally by The Marvelettes) (Eddie Holland, Whitfield) - 2:26
4. "Cloud Nine" (originally by The Temptations) (Strong, Whitfield) - 3:19
5. "Don't You Miss Me A Little Bit Baby" (originally by Jimmy Ruffin) (Penzabene, Strong, Whitfield) - 2:14
6. "So Long" (Holland, R. Dean Taylor, Whitfield) - 2:27

== Personnel ==
- Marvin Gaye - lead vocals
- The Andantes - background vocals
- The Originals - background vocals
- The Funk Brothers -instrumentation

LA Based Musicians for dates recorded at the Sound Factory:

- Wilton Felder and Ron Brown - Bass
- Gene Pello and James Gadson - Drums
- Louis Shelton and Don Peake - Guitar
- Joe Sample - Piano and Keyboards
- Gene Page - Arrangement and Conduction
- Other instruments from LA Based session musicians.
