= Sophisticated Soul =

Studio album by The Marvelettes
- Released: 1968
- Recorded: 1966–1968
- Genre: Pop, soul
- Label: Tamla (Motown)
- Producer: Smokey Robinson, Nickolas Ashford & Valerie Simpson

The Marvelettes chronology
The Marvelettes (1967)	Sophisticated Soul (1968)	In Full Bloom (1969)

Singles from Sophisticated Soul
- 1. "You're the One" Released: April 4, 1966; 2. "My Baby Must Be a Magician" Released: November 21, 1967; 3. "Here I Am Baby" Released: May 2, 1968; 4. "Destination: Anywhere / What's Easy for Two Is So Hard for One" Released: August 27, 1968; 5. "I'm Gonna Hold on as Long as I Can" Released: December 23, 1968

Professional ratings
Review scores
Source	Rating
AllMusic	3/5 stars

Sophisticated Soul is the eighth album issued by Motown girl-group the Marvelettes. It is the first album to feature Ann Bogan who replaced Gladys Horton in 1967 (although Horton's voice is featured on a few of the tracks), and most of the lead vocals are by Wanda Young. Like many Motown albums produced in the late 1960s, Sophisticated Soul featured backing from the Andantes, Motown's premier backing group, on certain tracks, others feature Bogan and Katherine Anderson.

== Overview ==
Since Holland-Dozier-Holland had left the Motown label in 1967, the studio artists had turned to in-house producers such as the team of Ashford & Simpson as well as Frank Wilson. This album was considered to promote a new style for the Marvelettes with Wanda Young fronting the group, and moving them to a style closer to that of fellow Motown girl-group the Supremes. The material consists of singles "My Baby Must Be a Magician" featuring Melvin Franklin of the Temptations, Ashford & Simpson's "Destination: Anywhere", "You're the One", and "Here I Am Baby". Also on the record is "I'm Gonna Hold On as Long as I Can", which was a modest hit featuring Bogan on lead vocals, and "What's Easy for Two Is So Hard for One", the B-side to "Destination: Anywhere", which charted but proved to be unsuccessful.

== Track listing ==
All songs written and produced by William "Smokey" Robinson unless noted otherwise.

=== Side 1 ===
1. "My Baby Must Be a Magician"
2. "Destination: Anywhere" (Nickolas Ashford, Valerie Simpson)
3. "I'm Gonna Hold on as Long as I Can" (Frank Wilson, Lena Manns)
4. "Here I Am Baby"
5. "You're the One for Me Bobby"
6. "Reachin' for Something I Can't Have" (James Dean, Cato Weatherspoon, William Weatherspoon)

=== Side 2 ===
1. "Your Love Can Save Me" (Nickolas Ashford, Valerie Simpson)
2. "You're the One"
3. "Don't Make Hurting Me a Habit" (James Jay Barnes, James Dean, William Weatherspoon)
4. "What's Easy for Two Is So Hard for One"
5. "The Stranger" (Ivy Jo Hunter)
6. "Someway, Somehow" (Richard Morris, Sylvia Moy)

== Personnel ==
- Wanda Young — lead vocals, except on "I'm Gonna Hold On as Long as I Can"
- Katherine Anderson — backing vocals (side 2, tracks 1–3, and 5)
- Ann Bogan — backing vocals (side 2, tracks 5), lead vocals on "I'm Gonna Hold On as Long as I Can"
- Gladys Horton — backing vocals (side 2, tracks 1–3)
- The Andantes — backing vocals (side 1, tracks 1, 3–6; side 2, tracks 1–4, 6)
- Melvin Franklin — spoken intro on "My Baby Must Be a Magician"
- Smokey Robinson — producer
- Ashford & Simpson — producers, backing vocals on "Destination: Anywhere"
- The Funk Brothers — instrumentation
- Marv Tarplin — guitar

== Singles history ==
- "You're the One" (number 48 U.S. Pop) (number 20 U.S. R&B)
- "My Baby Must Be a Magician" (number 17 U.S. Pop; number 8 U.S. R&B)
- "Here I Am Baby" (number 44 U.S. Pop) (number 14 U.S. R&B)
- "Destination: Anywhere" (number 63 U.S. Pop) (number 23 U.S. R&B)
  - "What's Easy for Two Is So Hard for One" (B-side of "Destination: Anywhere") (number 114 U.S. Pop)
- "I'm Gonna Hold On as Long as I Can" (number 76 U.S. Pop)
