= Ben Gordon (disambiguation) =

Ben Gordon (born 1983) is a British-American former basketball player.

Ben or Benjamin Gordon may also refer to:

- Ben Gordon (footballer, born 1985), Scottish footballer (Dumbarton, Alloa Athletic)
- Ben Gordon (footballer, born 1991), English footballer (Chelsea, Kilmarnock, Ross County, Colchester United)
- Ben Gordon (ice hockey) (born 1985), American ice hockey player
- Benjamin J. Gordon Jr (1932–1997), American minister, businessman and politician
- B. Frank Gordon (Benjamin Franklin Gordon, 1826–1866), Confederate States Army colonel during the American Civil War
- Benny Gordon (Benjamin Stark Gordon, born 1970), American stock car racing driver

== See also ==
- Benny Gordon (singer), American soul singer
- Gordon (disambiguation)
