= Sunrise (Jimmy Ruffin album) =

Studio album by Jimmy Ruffin
- Released: May 1980
- Recorded: 1979–1980
- Studios: Kingdon Studios, Syosset, New York; Criteria Studios, Miami
- Genres: Disco, funk, soul
- Label: RSO
- Producers: Robin Gibb, Blue Weaver

Jimmy Ruffin chronology
Love Is All We Need (1975)	Sunrise (1980)

Singles from Sunrise
- 1. "Hold On (To My Love)" Released: February 1980; 2. "Night of Love" Released: 1980

Professional ratings
Review scores
Source	Rating
Smash Hits	7½/10

Sunrise is the 11th and final album by American soul singer Jimmy Ruffin, it was released in May 1980 and was produced by Robin Gibb (of the Bee Gees) and Blue Weaver. The songs were co-written by Gibb either with Weaver and/or his brothers. This album was released in US, Netherlands, UK, Norway, and Germany. The lead single "Hold On (To My Love)" reached top ten in UK and US.

The last song recorded for the album was "Songbird" was originally recorded by the Bee Gees and released on the album Main Course in 1975. "Where Do I Go", a country-style ballad, is sung by Jimmy Ruffin with Marcy Levy.

== Track listing ==
All tracks written by Robin Gibb and Blue Weaver, except where noted.

Side one

1. "Hold On (To My Love)" – 3:32
2. "Forever" (Barry Gibb, Robin Gibb, Maurice Gibb) – 3:19
3. "Night of Love" – 3:50
4. "Searchin'" – 2:54
5. "Changin' Me" – 3:10

Side two

1. "Where Do I Go" (Barry Gibb, Robin Gibb, Maurice Gibb, Andy Gibb) – 3:53
2. "Two People" – 4:07
3. "Jealousy" – 3:58
4. "Songbird" (Barry Gibb, Robin Gibb, Maurice Gibb, Blue Weaver) – 4:40

== Personnel ==
- Jimmy Ruffin – lead vocal
- Robin Gibb – backing vocal
- Barry Gibb – backing vocal on "Where Do I Go"
- Blue Weaver – keyboards, synthesizer, orchestral arrangement, arranger
- Bobby Cadway – guitar
- Alan Kendall – guitar
- Dennis Bryon – drums, backing vocal
- George Perry – bass, backing vocal
- Yvonne Lewis – backing vocal
- Krystal Davis – backing vocal
- Janet Wright – backing vocal
- Chuck Kirkpatrick – bass
- Marcy Levy – lead vocal on "Where Do I Go"
- Joe Lala – percussion
- Pete Carr – guitar
- George Terry – guitar
- Charles Chalmers – backing vocal
- Sandy Rhodes – backing vocal
- Donna Rhodes – backing vocal
- Mike Lewis – orchestral arrangement, arranger

The Boneroo Horns on "Jealousy"

- Whit Sidener
- Ken Faulk
- Jeff Kievett
- Don Bonsanti
- Jamis Marshall

Production

- Greg Kolotkin – sound engineer (Kingdom Studios)
- Dennis Hetzendorfer – sound engineer (Criteria Studios)
- Robin Gibb – producer
- Blue Weaver – producer
