= Farewell Is a Lonely Sound =

1969 single by Jimmy Ruffin

- Cover of the single released in the Netherlands

Single by Jimmy Ruffin

from the album Ruff'n Ready
- B-side: "If You Will Let Me, I Know I Can"
- Released: October 7, 1969
- Recorded: March 1967
- Studio: Hitsville U.S.A., Detroit, Michigan
- Genre: Soul
- Length: 2:56
- Label: Soul; Tamla Motown
- Songwriter(s): James Dean; William Weatherspoon; Jack Alan Goga
- Producer(s): James Dean; William Weatherspoon

Jimmy Ruffin singles chronology
"I've Passed This Way Before" (1969)	"Farewell Is a Lonely Sound" (1969)	"It's Wonderful (To Be Loved by You)" (1970)

"Farewell Is a Lonely Sound" is a song by American soul singer Jimmy Ruffin, released as a single in October 1969 from his album Ruff'n Ready. It peaked at number 8 on the UK Singles Chart.

== Release and reception ==
"Farewell Is a Lonely Sound" was recorded in March 1967 at Motown's Hitsville U.S.A. studio, but was only first released in March 1969 on the album Ruff'n Ready. Having released two singles from the album in 1968, "I'll Say Forever My Love" and "Don't Let Him Take Your Love from Me", both of which had failed to make much of an impact on the charts, the record label chose to release "Farewell Is a Lonely Sound" as a single in a last attempt to get a hit song from the album. It was released in the US in October 1969 and in the UK in February 1970.

The single was re-released in October 1974 after a re-release of "What Becomes of the Broken Hearted" became a top-ten hit in the UK for the second time.

Reviewing for Record Mirror, James Hamilton described the song as "very much in the mould of his past hits, it's a semi-slow sentimental swayer, to the well-tried formula".

== Track listings ==
7": Soul / S-35060 (1969)

1. "Farewell Is a Lonely Sound" – 2:56
2. "If You Will Let Me, I Know I Can" – 2:59

7": Tamla Motown / TMG 922 (1974)

1. "Farewell Is a Lonely Sound" – 2:56
2. "I Will Never Let You Get Away" – 2:55

== Charts ==
Chart (1969–70)	Peak position
Ireland (IRMA)	20
UK Singles (OCC)	8
US Bubbling Under the Hot 100 (Billboard)	104

Chart (1974)	Peak position
UK Singles (OCC)	30
