= (Like A) Nightmare =

Single by The Andantes
- B-side: "If You Were Mine"
- Released: March 1964
- Recorded: Hitsville U.S.A. (Studio A); 1964
- Genre: Rock and roll, R&B
- Length: 2:38
- Label: V.I.P. VIP 25006
- Songwriter(s): Holland–Dozier–Holland
- Producer(s): Brian Holland; Lamont Dozier

The Andantes singles chronology
"Too Hurt to Cry, Too Much in Love to Say Goodbye" (1963)	"(Like A) Nightmare" / "If You Were Mine" (1964)

"(Like A) Nightmare" is a 1964 single recorded by The Andantes for the V.I.P. (Motown) label. Written and composed by Motown's main production team Holland–Dozier–Holland, it became the second and last official single by the session group from the company.

The song's narrator tells off her lover, saying how it hurt her to find he's been unfaithful to her.

It was Like A Nightmare,
To know my love you didn't share,
Like A Nightmare,
To see you in a love affair.

Although this is the only single credited to the group, it was actually their second single; their previous single "Too Hurt to Cry, Too Much in Love to Say Goodbye" was credited to "the Darnells". The Andantes, as one of the label's main session groups, sang background vocals for numerous Motown acts, and used to "sweeten" the sound of others. The group was apparently promised by the company that they would be allowed to record a few singles, but this single was the only one credited to the group. Furthermore, the group was not even allowed to front either side of either single. Former Challengers III lead, and future Marvelette, Ann Bogan leads both sides of this single. (Marvelette Gladys Horton, whom Bogan later replaced, was main lead on the previous single's A-side; Lamont Dozier, of Holland–Dozier–Holland, lead its B-side.) Motown did little to promote the single and it was quickly withdrawn, and thus did not chart. The group would continue to back the labels acts in the studio until the labels move to Los Angeles in 1972.

The Andantes would back Bogan again on the Marvelettes' 1968 single "I'm Gonna Hold On as Long as I Can". By the time the Marvelettes disbanded at the end of the decade, the Andantes had, including their singles as well, backed all three Marvelettes lead singers on 16 singles (and several more recordings).

== Personnel ==
- Lead vocals by Ann Bogan
- Background vocals by The Andantes: Jackie Hicks, Marlene Barrow, and Louvain Demps
- Instrumentation by The Funk Brothers
