= Ann Bogan =

American singer (1941–2026)

- Born: March 27, 1941; Cleveland, Ohio, U.S.
- Died: August 6, 2026 (aged 85)
- Genres: R&B

Ann Bogan (March 27, 1941 – August 6, 2026), sometimes credited as Anne Bogan, was an American singer, notable as recording member of the Motown girl-group The Andantes and later, a touring and recording member of The Marvelettes.

== Early life and career ==
Ann Bogan was born in Cleveland, Ohio, on March 17, 1941. Bogan recorded one single as an Andante, released in 1964. Bogan joined the Marvelettes in 1967 after lead singer Gladys Horton departed. She can be heard on their releases Sophisticated Soul, In Full Bloom, and The Return of The Marvelettes, however neither Katherine Anderson nor Bogan appear on the cover of The Return of The Marvelettes. The cover instead featured a new picture of Wanda Young and two fake Marvelettes (reportedly Billie Rae Calvin and Brenda Joyce Evans of The Undisputed Truth, whose faces are purposely unidentifiable) on horseback to emphasize the album's new title.

After the Marvelettes disbanded in 1970, Bogan became a part of the New Birth and their subgroup, Love, Peace & Happiness, before retiring to raise her children.

== Later life and death ==
In 2012, Bogan was interviewed for an episode spotlighting the Marvelettes on the TV-One show, Unsung.

Bogan died on August 6, 2026, at the age of 85.

== Discography ==
As lead singer of The Andantes:

(Like A) Nightmare – 1964

As lead singer of the Marvelettes:

- "I'm Gonna Hold on as Long as I Can" – from Sophisticated Soul – 1968
- "Everybody Knows (but You)" – from In Full Bloom – 1969

== Awards and nominations ==
As a Marvelette, Bogan was nominated for 2013 induction into the Rock and Roll Hall of Fame. The group made the ballot a second time for induction in the year 2015.
