= Too Hurt to Cry, Too Much in Love to Say Goodbye =

1963 single by The Marvelettes

Single by The Marvelettes and The Andantes (Credited as The Darnells)
- B-side: "Come On Home"
- Released: November 4, 1963
- Recorded: Hitsville U.S.A. (Studio A); 1963
- Genre: Rock and roll, doo-wop, R&B
- Length: 2:15
- Label: Gordy G7024 A
- Songwriter(s): Holland–Dozier–Holland
- Producer(s): Brian Holland; Lamont Dozier

The Marvelettes singles chronology
"As Long as I Know He's Mine" (1963)	"Too Hurt to Cry, Too Much in Love to Say Goodbye" (1963)	"He's a Good Guy (Yes He Is)" (1964)

The Andantes singles chronology
""Too Hurt to Cry, Too Much in Love to Say Goodbye"/" (1963)	"(Like A) Nightmare" (1964)

"Too Hurt to Cry, Too Much in Love to Say Goodbye" is a 1963 song and single written and composed by Motown's main production team Holland–Dozier–Holland. Credited to the Darnells, the performers on both sides of the single were the Andantes (both sides), Holland–Dozier–Holland (B-side only), Mary Wilson of the Supremes (B-side), and members of the Marvelettes (A-side only), the Four Tops, and the Temptations (both on the B-side). Nobody involved with the production on either side was pleased with the false credit. The single peaked at number 17 on the Billboard Bubbling Under Hot 100 chart.

The song on the A-side has the narrator the audience of the emotional pain she experiences after seeing her lover kissing and holding another girl across the room (and he did not notice she was there). The A-side is now officially considered both a Marvelettes single, and the first of two official singles by the Andantes by the Motown company. Marvelettes lead singer Gladys Horton is the main lead on the song, with her groupmate Wanda Young and Andantes member Louvain Demps on harmony co-lead. For the Marvelettes this recording would be similar to some of their later songs (as wells as songs by the Supremes, the Vandellas, and the Velvelettes), in which the only group members heard on the songs are the ones singing lead. In the Andantes' case Demps' harmony vocals on this song, and her group's backing chime-offs on Mary Wells's "My Guy" and Marvin Gaye's "Ain't That Peculiar" and solo speaking lines on Barbara McNair's "Fancy Passes", would be the closest any member of the group would get to front any recording at Motown; as they would not be allowed to sing main lead on either side on this single, nor their follow-up "(Like A) Nightmare" b/w "If You Were Mine". The song was an attempt to emulate the Wall of Sound production methods of Phil Spector.

The Supremes recorded their own version in 1965, intended for their album More Hits by The Supremes, but it would not be released until 1987, when it was placed on their compilation album, The Never-Before-Released Masters.

== Personnel ==
=== Marvelettes/Andantes version ===
- Lead vocals by Gladys Horton, Wanda Young and Louvain Demps
- Background vocals by The Andantes: Jackie Hicks, Marlene Barrow, and Louvain Demps
- Instrumentation by The Funk Brothers

=== Supremes version ===
- Lead vocals by Diana Ross
- Background vocals by Florence Ballard and Mary Wilson
- Instrumentation by The Funk Brothers

== "Come On Home" ==
"Come On Home"

Single by Holland–Dozier & The Andantes (Credited as The Darnells on 2nd single)
- A-side: "What Goes Up Must Come Down"(1st single); "Too Hurt to Cry, Too Much in Love to Say Goodbye" (2nd single)
- Released: June 12, 1963 (1st single); November 4, 1963 (2nd single)
- Recorded: Hitsville U.S.A. (Studio A) 1963
- Genre: Rock and roll, doo-wop, R&B
- Length: 2:24
- Label: Motown M1045 B Gordy G7024 B
- Songwriter(s): Holland–Dozier–Holland-Bradford
- Producer(s): Brian Holland; Lamont Dozier

The B-side to "Too Hurt to Cry, Too Much in Love to Say Goodbye" was "Come On Home", written and composed by Motown's main production team Holland–Dozier–Holland with Eddie Holland's predecessor Janie Bradford. It was originally credited to Holland–Dozier (Brian Holland & Lamont Dozier) and was previously the B-Side to their single "What Goes Up Must Come Down". (It was later credited as by the Darnells as well.) Now officially a Holland–Dozier/Andantes single, two versions of the song were released. First was a version with just instrumentation by the Funk Brothers, the second version was led by Dozier and featured the Holland brothers, the Andantes, Supremes member Mary Wilson, and various members of the Four Tops and the Temptations all singing backing vocals. It is unclear if both the instrumental version and the vocal version were released on different copies of the first single, but the vocal version was the only one releasesd on the second one.

=== Personnel ===
- Lead vocals by Lamont Dozier
- Background vocals by Holland–Dozier–Holland, Mary Wilson, The Andantes, The Four Tops and The Temptations
- Instrumentation by The Funk Brothers
