= Hold On (To My Love) =

Single by Jimmy Ruffin

from the album Sunrise
- B-side: "Hold On (To My Love) (Instrumental)"
- Released: February 1980
- Recorded: November 1979
- Studio: Kingdom Sound Studios, Syosset, New York
- Genre: Disco
- Length: 3:32
- Label: RSO
- Songwriters: Robin Gibb, Blue Weaver
- Producers: Robin Gibb, Blue Weaver

Jimmy Ruffin singles chronology
| "Fallin' In Love With You" (1977) | "Hold On (To My Love)" (1980) | "Night of Love" (1980) |

"Hold On (To My Love)" is a song written by Robin Gibb and Blue Weaver and performed by American soul singer Jimmy Ruffin, released in 1980 on his album Sunrise. It reached No. 10 in the US, No. 29 US R&B and No. 7 in the UK.

== Personnel ==
- Jimmy Ruffin - lead and backing vocals
- Blue Weaver - keyboards, synthesizer
- Bobby Cadway - guitar
- George Perry - backing vocals, bass
- Dennis Bryon - backing vocals, drums
- Yvonne Levis, Janet Wright & Krystal Davis - backing vocals
- Glen Kolotkin - engineer

== Chart performance ==
| Chart (1980) | Peak position |
|---|---|
| Canada RPM Adult Contemporary | 36 |
| Ireland (IRMA) | 8 |
| UK Singles Chart | 7 |
| US Billboard Hot 100 | 10 |
| US Hot Soul Singles (Billboard) | 29 |
| US Adult Contemporary (Billboard) | 32 |
