= Trude Heller's =

Former club in Manhattan, New York

- Interactive map of Trude Heller's
- Location: 6th Avenue and West 9th Street, New York City, New York, U.S.
- Coordinates: 40.734043°N 73.999025°W
- Type: Nightclub
- Events: Rock and roll, rock music

Construction
- Opened: late 1950s
- Closed: 1980s

Trude Heller's was a nightclub in Greenwich Village, Manhattan, New York City and located at 6th Avenue and West 9th Street and operated from the early 1960s to the early 1980s. It has been described as the only truly "in" spot in Greenwich Village. Some of the acts that got their starts there were Duane and Gregg Allman of the Allman Brothers, Cyndi Lauper, and The Manhattan Transfer.

== History ==
The club began its days in the early 1960s as a swinging Greenwich Village discothèque, run by a tough entrepreneur named Trude Heller.

In the 1960s, go-go dancers could be seen dancing along the walls. Some of the people that danced on the floor there were Salvador Dalí, George Hamilton and Lynda Bird Johnson.

The end of the disco craze in the early 1980s spelled the end of the club. Nowadays, Lenny's sandwich chain is in the premises.

== Acts ==
Two of the house bands there were Barry and the Remains and Benny Gordon and the Soul Brothers. Some of the headlining acts were Ben E. King, Otis Redding, and Sam the Sham and the Pharaohs.

Other acts who appeared there include The Lovin' Spoonful, who played, rushed off to perform on television on The Ed Sullivan Show and returned; the Beastie Boys in their early days; Frankie Paris and the Purple Haze; Funk Steady; Goldie and the Gingerbreads (featuring Genya Ravan); The Scoundrels; Artie Stewart; and Marion Taylor and the Reggie Moore Trio. Jazz singer Anita O'Day and jazz pianist Ahmad Jamal also appeared there.
