= I'll Say Forever My Love =

1968 single by Jimmy Ruffin

- Cover of the single released in the Netherlands

Single by Jimmy Ruffin

from the album Ruff'n Ready
- B-side: "Everybody Needs Love"
- Released: February 13, 1968
- Recorded: October 1967
- Studio: Hitsville U.S.A., Detroit, Michigan
- Genre: Soul
- Length: 2:57
- Label: Soul; Tamla Motown
- Songwriters: James Dean; William Weatherspoon; Stephen Bowden
- Producers: James Dean; William Weatherspoon

Jimmy Ruffin singles chronology
"Don't You Miss Me a Little Bit Baby" (1967)	"I'll Say Forever My Love" (1968)	"Don't Let Him Take Your Love from Me" (1968)

"I'll Say Forever My Love" is a song by American soul singer Jimmy Ruffin, released as a single in February 1968 and included on his 1969 album Ruff'n Ready.

== Release ==
"I'll Say Forever My Love" was recorded in October 1967 at Motown's Hitsville U.S.A. studio and was first released on February 13, 1968, in the US. It was then released in the UK a month later. It only peaked at number 77 on the Billboard Hot 100, continuing Ruffin's decline in popularity in the US. It failed to enter the UK Top 50, instead peaking at number 2 on the 'Bubbling Under' list. After chart successes with the reissued singles "I've Passed This Way Before" and "Farewell Is a Lonely Sound", "I'll Say Forever My Love" was re-released in the UK on May 29, 1970. It fared much better this time, peaking at number 7 in August.

== Reception ==
Reviewed in Billboard: "this strong blues ballad with driving dance beat will put the fine stylist right back in the selling bag of his "I've Passed This Way Before" and "What Becomes of the Brokenhearted". Cash Box wrote that "Ruffin has a powerhouse outing here that should set him high in the r&b spotlight with potential for pop breakout as well".

Reviewed in Record Mirror, the song was described as "another soulful plaintive ballad with plenty of catchy appeal". Derek Johnson for New Musical Express described the song as a "solid basic Motown – a heavy tambourine accentuated beat, sweeping strings and massive choral effects in the backing. Plus a bluesy and compelling solo from Jim".

== Charts ==
Chart (1968)	Peak position
UK Singles (OCC)	52
US Billboard Hot 100	77
US Cash Box Top 100	70

Chart (1970)	Peak position
UK Singles (OCC)	7
