= Resolving Contradictions =

Studio album by Andy Mackay
- Released: 1978
- Recorded: March–July 1978
- Studio: Basing Street, London; Sawmills, Cornwall
- Genre: Rock
- Label: Bronze
- Producer: Andy Mackay

Andy Mackay chronology
In Search of Eddie Riff (1974)	Resolving Contradictions (1978)

Professional ratings
Review scores
Source	Rating
AllMusic	4/5 stars

Resolving Contradictions is the second solo studio album by English rock musician Andy Mackay, released on Bronze Records in 1978.

Andy Mackay was once Roxy Music's saxophonist, and some members of the group play on this album. The record is a 'concept album' with references to the Chinese culture. The cover, designed by Jane Mackay, figures a post-Cultural Revolution scene.

== Track listing ==
All songs by Andy Mackay, except "Battersea Rise" by Ray Russell and Andy Mackay.

1. "Iron Blossom"
2. "Trumpets on the Mountains/Off to Work/'Unreal City'"
3. "The Loyang Tractor Factory"
4. "Rivers"
5. "Battersea Rise"
6. "Skill and Sweat"
7. "The Ortolan Bunting (A Sparrow's Fall)"
8. "The Inexorable Sequence"
9. "A Song of Friendship (The Renmin Hotel)"
10. "Alloy Blossom (Trumpets in the Suburbs)"
11. "Green and Gold"

== Personnel ==
- Andy Mackay – saxophone, oboe, cor Anglais, piano, synthesizer
- Ray Russell – guitar, string and brass arrangements
- Mo Foster – bass
- Tony Stevens – bass
- Paul Thompson – drums, timpani, gong
- Peter van Hooke – drums
- Phil Manzanera – guitar solo on "The Inexorable Sequence"
- Tim Wheater – Chinese reed flute
- Chris Parren – keyboards
- Gavyn Wright – violin solo
- Michael Laird – trumpet

Production and artwork

- Phill Brown – assistant producer, engineer
- Jane Mackay – assistant producer, cover
- Eric Scott – cover painting
