= It's Wonderful (To Be Loved by You) =

1970 single by Jimmy Ruffin

- Cover of the single released in Germany

Single by Jimmy Ruffin

from the album Ruff'n Ready
- B-side: "Maria (You Were the Only One)"
- Released: October 2, 1970
- Recorded: January 1968
- Studio: Hitsville U.S.A., Detroit, Michigan
- Genre: Soul
- Length: 2:43
- Label: Tamla Motown
- Songwriter(s): James Dean; William Weatherspoon
- Producer(s): James Dean; William Weatherspoon

Jimmy Ruffin singles chronology
"Farewell Is a Lonely Sound" (1970)	"It's Wonderful (To Be Loved by You)" (1970)	"Let's Say Goodbye Tomorrow" (1970)

"It's Wonderful (To Be Loved by You)" is a song by American soul singer Jimmy Ruffin, released as a single in October 1970, taken from his 1969 album Ruff'n Ready.

== Release ==
"It's Wonderful (To Be Loved by You)" was recorded in January 1968 at Motown's Hitsville U.S.A. studio. The single wasn't released in the US, where Ruffin had declined in popularity since his 1966 top-ten hit "What Becomes of the Brokenhearted", in part due to a lack of promotion and becoming seemingly unwanted by Motown in the US. However, in the UK prior to this release, Ruffin had had two top-ten re-released singles, "Farewell Is a Lonely Sound" and "I'll Say Forever My Love". "It's Wonderful (To Be Loved by You)" charted higher than both of them, peaking at number 6 on the UK Singles Chart. Yet, Motown were uninterested by this and in the end Ruffin left the label and moved to the UK.

The B-side, "Maria (You Were the Only One)", also known for being covered by Michael Jackson on his debut solo album Got to Be There, was recorded in January 1970 and included on Ruffin's album The Groove Governor. It was released as a single in the US at the end of 1970 and charted on the Billboard Hot 100. In Germany and the Netherlands, where both "It's Wonderful (To Be Loved by You)" and "Maria (You Were the Only One)" were released as singles, "It's Wonderful (To Be Loved by You)" had a different B-side, "Love Gives, Love Takes Away".

== Track listings ==
7"

1. "It's Wonderful (To Be Loved by You)" – 2:43
2. "Maria (You Were The Only One)" – 2:56

7" (Germany and Netherlands)

1. "It's Wonderful (To Be Loved by You)" – 2:43
2. "Love Gives, Love Takes Away" – 2:58

== Charts ==
Chart (1970)	Peak position
UK Singles (OCC)	6
