= I've Passed This Way Before =

1966 single by Jimmy Ruffin

- Cover of the single released in the Netherlands

Single by Jimmy Ruffin

from the album Jimmy Ruffin Sings Top Ten
- B-side: "Tomorrow's Tears"
- Released: November 15, 1966
- Recorded: September–October 1966
- Studio: Hitsville U.S.A., Detroit, Michigan
- Genre: Soul
- Length: 2:46
- Label: Soul; Tamla Motown
- Songwriters: James Dean; William Weatherspoon
- Producers: James Dean; William Weatherspoon

Jimmy Ruffin singles chronology
| "What Becomes of the Brokenhearted" (1966) | "I've Passed This Way Before" (1966) | "Gonna Give Her All the Love I've Got" (1967) |

"I've Passed This Way Before" is a song by American soul singer Jimmy Ruffin, released as a single in November 1966 from his album Jimmy Ruffin Sings Top Ten. It peaked at number 17 on the Billboard Hot 100 and number 29 on the UK Singles Chart.

== Release ==
"I've Passed This Way Before" was recorded in September and October 1966 at Motown's Hitsville U.S.A. studio. It was released in the US on November 15, 1966, and in the UK on February 3, 1967, on the back of the top-ten hit "What Becomes of the Brokenhearted". It was not as successful as Ruffin's previous single, but was a top-twenty hit in the US and top-thirty in the UK. The single was re-released in the UK on 4 July 1969 as an edited version, removing the spoken intro. This led Ruffin to have a revival in popularity in the UK, and went on to have three top-ten singles in 1970, "Farewell Is a Lonely Sound", "I'll Say Forever My Love" and "It's Wonderful (To Be Loved by You)".

When the single was re-released, Ruffin went on a three-week British tour. Motown was having a revival in the UK and Ruffin hadn't had much success in the previous few years. In an interview in Melody Maker, he said that in the US the label "keep putting me in the R&B thing and the public don't like it. The material is good, it's just that the public don't dig me doing it. R&B isn't the hot thing anymore, there's been such a lot of it in the past two years".

== Reception ==
Billboard wrote that "Ruffin has even more potential in this rocking blues belter" than "What Becomes of the Brokenhearted". Reviewed in Cash Box, it was described as a "dynamite effort" and that "the throbbing, infectious soul grabbing sound backs Ruffin’s lovely chanting". However, reviewing for Record Mirror, Peter Jones wrote that it "wasn't as good as "What Becomes of the Brokenhearted", but it builds into a sturdy Tamla typified number".

== Charts ==
| Chart (1966–67) | Peak position |
|---|---|
| Australia (Kent Music Report) | 30 |
| Canada Top Singles (RPM) | 8 |
| Canada (CHUM) | 7 |
| UK Singles (Official Charts) | 29 |
| US Billboard Hot 100 | 17 |
| US Hot R&B/Hip-Hop Songs (Billboard) | 10 |
| US Cash Box Top 100 | 17 |
| US Cash Box Top R&B 50 | 7 |

| Chart (1969) | Peak position |
|---|---|
| UK Singles (Official Charts) | 33 |
