= The Return of The Marvelettes =

Studio album by The Marvelettes
- Released: September 15, 1970
- Recorded: Hitsville USA, 1969-1970
- Genre: R&B, soul
- Label: Tamla (Motown); TS 305
- Producer: Smokey Robinson

The Marvelettes chronology
In Full Bloom (1969)	The Return of The Marvelettes (1970)	The Marvelettes Anthology (1975)

Singles from The Return of The Marvelettes
- 1. "Marionette" Released: November 3, 1970; 2. "A Breathtaking Guy" Released: January 11, 1972

Professional ratings
Review scores
Source	Rating
Allmusic	link

The Return of The Marvelettes was marketed as the last album by the group, although in reality their last had been 1969's In Full Bloom. It was originally recorded to launch the solo career of former Marvelette Wanda Young, and was produced by Smokey Robinson.

== Overview ==
By the mid-1960s, The Marvelettes had lost their status as Motown's top girl group, as much of the company's focus and promotion turned to The Supremes. In 1970, around the time the Marvelettes disbanded, Smokey Robinson had Wanda Young record what was intended as her first solo album with premiere back-up group The Andantes. The material chiefly consisted of older Motown songs that have been overlooked such as "After All" (originally by The Miracles), "I'll Be in Trouble" (originally by The Temptations), and "A Breathtaking Guy" (originally by The Supremes) along with a cover of "Uptown" by The Crystals, and a few Marvelettes songs that had been recorded before the group's dissolution (including "Uptown" and "That's How Heartaches Are Made", which were both featured on the Marvelettes' previous album, In Full Bloom). "That's How Heartaches Are Made" peaked at No. 97 on the Billboard Hot 100. Young's version of the Supremes song was released as a single, but along with "Marionette" (a song originally recorded by Kim Weston), the other single pulled from the album, it failed to chart.

By late 1969, Young's voice was already going into a downfall due to her problems with drugs and alcohol. Producers did not believe that Young's name and voice had enough commercial appeal, and so the album ended up being marketed as a Marvelettes album. The news of the solo album, and its later remarketing as the Marvelettes's final album, so outraged Young's groupmates Katherine Anderson and Ann Bogan that they refused to participate in appearing on the album's cover due to what they felt was Motown's disrespect towards them and the group in general. The record's cover instead featured a new picture of Young and two fake Marvelettes (reportedly Billie Rae Calvin and Brenda Joyce Evans of The Undisputed Truth, whose faces are purposely unidentifiable) on horseback to emphasize the album's new title.

Upon release Motown very quickly lost interest in album sales and did not promote it; the other Marvelettes (who by now had already gone their separate ways) refused to help promote the album, and with Young awaiting the birth of her third child with husband Bobby Rogers, she was unable to promote it. The album barely managed to reach #50 on the Billboard R&B album charts, but missed the Billboard Pop album charts.

== Track listing ==
=== Side 1 ===
1. "So I Can Love You" (Sheila Hutchinson) (originally recorded by The Emotions)
2. "Marionette" (Smokey Robinson, William "Mickey" Stevenson) (originally recorded by Kim Weston)
3. "That's How Heartaches Are Made" (Bob Halley, Ben Raleigh) (originally recorded by Baby Washington)
4. "A Breathtaking Guy" (Robinson) (originally recorded by The Supremes)
5. "No More Tear Stained Make Up" (Robinson) (originally recorded by Martha & the Vandellas)
6. "Uptown" (Cynthia Weil, Barry Mann) (originally recorded by The Crystals)

=== Side 2 ===
1. "Someday We'll Be Together" (Johnny Bristol, Jackey Beavers, Harvey Fuqua) (originally recorded by Johnny & Jackey)
2. "After All" (Robinson) (originally recorded by the Miracles)
3. "Our Lips Just Seem To Rhyme Every Time" (Robinson, Al Cleveland)
4. "Fading Away" (Robinson, Pete Moore, Bobby Rogers) (originally recorded by the Temptations)
5. "Take Me Where You Go" (Robinson, Moore) (originally recorded by The Supremes)
6. "I'll Be In Trouble" (Robinson) (originally recorded by The Temptations)

== Personnel ==
- Wanda Young - lead vocals
- The Andantes - backing vocals
- Katherine Anderson - backing vocals on "Uptown"
- Ann Bogan - backing vocals on "Uptown"
- Smokey Robinson - producer
- The Funk Brothers - instrumentation
