= Gonna Give Her All the Love I've Got =

1967 Soul song

- Cover of the single released in the Netherlands

Single by Jimmy Ruffin

from the album Jimmy Ruffin Sings Top Ten
- B-side: "World So Wide Nowhere to Hide (From Your Heart)"
- Released: February 23, 1967
- Recorded: August 1966
- Studio: Hitsville USA
- Genre: Soul
- Label: Soul; S 35032
- Songwriters: Norman Whitfield; Barrett Strong
- Producer: Norman Whitfield

Jimmy Ruffin singles chronology
| "I've Passed This Way Before" (1966) | "Gonna Give Her All the Love I've Got" (1967) | "Don't You Miss Me a Little Bit Baby" (1967) |

"Gonna Give Her All the Love I've Got"

Single by Marvin Gaye

from the album That's the Way Love Is
- A-side: "How Can I Forget"
- Released: December 16, 1969
- Recorded: Hitsville USA; 1969
- Genre: Soul
- Length: 3:21
- Label: Tamla; T 54190
- Songwriters: Norman Whitfield; Barrett Strong
- Producer: Norman Whitfield

Marvin Gaye singles chronology
| "What You Gave Me" (1969) | "How Can I Forget" / "Gonna Give Her All the Love I've Got" (1969) | "The Onion Song" (1970) |

"Gonna Give Her All the Love I've Got" is a 1967 Soul song, originally recorded and made a hit by Jimmy Ruffin on Motown's Soul Label imprint. Ruffin's 1967 original version, from his album Jimmy Ruffin Sings Top Ten, reached the Pop Top 30, peaking at #29, and was a Top 20 R&B Hit as well, peaking at #14. It was also a hit in Britain, reaching #26 on the UK Singles Chart. The song has a social context: it depicts a man anticipating his release from prison on the morrow, when he'll return home on a train to "the girl that I left behind," promising himself that he will reward her steadfast love for him by "giv[ing] her all the love [he's] got." The song was written by Norman Whitfield and Barrett Strong and produced by Whitfield.

Benny Gordon recorded his version of the song. Backed with "Turn on Your Love Light", it was released on Wand 1188. It was a four star pick in the 17 August issue of Record World, with the reviewer saying it "Will be right for many boogalooers". For the week of 21 September, it was reported that Benny Gordon's song was new at WWRL in NYC. Also that week, in the R&B Station Listings section of Record World, Gordon's song was listed as a pick at WJLD in Birmingham. As shown in the 28 September issue of Record World, it was on the playlist of WJLD in Birmingham. It was reported in the 5 October issue of Record World that his record was getting attention.

In 1970, Jimmy Ruffin's Motown labelmate Marvin Gaye, released the song on the Tamla label. released from his album, That's the Way Love Is. Gaye's cover version of the song was a modest hit when Gaye released it in early 1970, peaking at #67 on the Billboard Hot 100 and at #26 on the Hot Selling Soul Singles chart. For Gaye the single was a double sided hit, as its flip side, "How Can I Forget" also charted (#41 US Pop, #18 US R&B).

Still another Motown act, The Temptations, recorded the tune as part of their album "The Temptations Wish It Would Rain. However, it was The Temptations' baritone lead singer, Paul Williams, that sang lead vocals on the song, rather than Jimmy's brother, Temptations member David Ruffin. Their version was also released as a B-side to their hit single, "I Could Never Love Another (After Loving You)", which turned out to be Ruffin's last lead released before he left the group.

Tony Tribe did a single cover of the song with Trojan Records, before dying in a car accident in Canada in 1970.

== Credits ==
=== Jimmy Ruffin version ===
- Lead vocals by Jimmy Ruffin
- Background vocals by The Originals and The Andantes
- Instrumentation by The Funk Brothers and the Detroit Symphony Orchestra
- Produced by Norman Whitfield

=== Marvin Gaye version ===
- Lead (and additional background) vocals by Marvin Gaye
- Instrumentation by The Funk Brothers and the Detroit Symphony Orchestra
- Produced by Norman Whitfield

=== Temptations version ===
- Lead vocals by Paul Williams
- Background vocals by Eddie Kendricks, Melvin Franklin, David Ruffin, and Otis Williams
- Instrumentation by The Funk Brothers
- Produced By Norman Whitfield
