= William Weatherspoon =

American songwriter (1936–2005)

- Born: February 11, 1936; Detroit, Michigan, U.S.
- Died: July 17, 2005 (aged 69); Lathrup Village, Michigan, U.S.
- Occupations: Songwriter; record producer
- Known for: Co-writing "What Becomes of the Brokenhearted"
- Relatives: John Witherspoon

William Henry Weatherspoon (February 11, 1936 – July 17, 2005) was an American songwriter and record producer, best known for his work for Motown Records in the 1960s. He co-wrote "What Becomes of the Brokenhearted", an international hit for Jimmy Ruffin, and many other hit songs.

== Biography ==
He was born in Detroit, Michigan, United States, on February 11, 1936; his younger brother was the actor John Witherspoon.

William Weatherspoon began singing in 1956 with a local vocal group, the Tornados, led by Charles Sutton, formerly of The Midnighters. The group split up in 1960, and, after a spell in the US military, Weatherspoon began working as a songwriter and producer for the Correc-Tone label in Detroit.

After that label folded, he began working for Motown, and paired up with fellow songwriter James Dean to write a series of hits, mostly for junior or relatively minor artists on the company's roster. With Dean and arranger Paul Riser, Weatherspoon wrote "What Becomes of the Brokenhearted", a US no.6 pop hit in 1966, and also co-produced the record with William "Mickey" Stevenson. Weatherspoon's other writing successes at Motown included Jimmy Ruffin's follow-up hit "I've Passed This Way Before" (with Dean) and his 1970 UK hits "Farewell Is a Lonely Sound" (with Dean and Jack Goga), "I'll Say Forever My Love" (with Dean and Stephen Bowden), and "It's Wonderful (To Be Loved by You)" (with Dean); Marv Johnson's "I'll Pick a Rose for My Rose" (with Dean and Johnson); and Edwin Starr's "I Am the Man for You Baby" (with Dean and Bowden). Weatherspoon and Dean also co-produced "When You're Young and in Love", a hit for The Marvelettes.

When Eddie Holland, Lamont Dozier, and Brian Holland left Motown in 1968, Weatherspoon joined them at Invictus Records, and established a songwriting partnership with Angelo Bond. They provided several hits for Laura Lee, including "Women's Love Rights" and "Rip Off", and "I'm Not My Brother's Keeper" for The Flaming Ember. Weatherspoon returned to Motown in about 1980 and continued to write for The Temptations, High Inergy, and others.

In later years, Weatherspoon concentrated on writing and producing gospel music, including albums by Laura Lee. He died of a heart attack at his home in Lathrup Village, Michigan on July 17, 2005, at the age of 69.
