= James Dean (songwriter) =

American songwriter

James Anthony Dean (February 7, 1943 – April 9, 2006) was an American songwriter. He was best known for his work at Motown Records in the 1960s, often in collaboration with William Weatherspoon with whom he co-wrote several hits, including Jimmy Ruffin's "What Becomes of the Brokenhearted". Dean also co-wrote, with John Glover, "You Don't Have to Be a Star (To Be in My Show)", a US No. 1 hit for Marilyn McCoo and Billy Davis, Jr.

== Biography ==
Dean was born in Detroit the oldest child to Richard and Dorothy Dean, and attended Hamtramck High School in Hamtramck, Michigan. He served in the US Army, and then began working as a songwriter for Motown in 1964. He teamed up with William Weatherspoon to write hits for Jimmy Ruffin ("What Becomes of the Brokenhearted", "I've Passed This Way Before", "Farewell Is a Lonely Sound", "I'll Say Forever My Love", and "It's Wonderful (To Be Loved by You)"); Marv Johnson ("I'll Pick a Rose for My Rose"); Edwin Starr ("I Am the Man for You Baby"); and others. Dean co-wrote The Supremes' "Everything Is Good About You Baby" with Eddie Holland; Eddie and Brian Holland were Dean's cousins. He and Weatherspoon also co-produced "When You're Young and in Love", a hit for the Marvelettes.

With John Glover, Dean co-wrote for the Four Tops, First Choice, and Marilyn McCoo and Billy Davis Jr., having his greatest success with the latter pair's 1976 US No. 1 record "You Don't Have to Be a Star (To Be in My Show)".

Dean died from cancer of the spine at his home in Detroit in 2006 at the age of 63.
