= Krystal Davis =

American singer

Krystal L. Davis
- Born: United States
- Genres: Post-disco, electropop, new wave, urban
- Occupations: Musician songwriter actress
- Instrument: Vocals
- Years active: 1978–present
- Labels: Urban Rock (1985); Various

Krystal L. Davis, or simply Krystal Davis, is an American session musician and background singer for Herbie Mann, Evelyn King and Cyndi Lauper.

Her single "So Smooth" was released in 1985 and peaked at number nine on the Billboard Hot Dance Singles Sales chart, staying there for 12 weeks.

== Biography ==
Her musical career began with the 1977 production titled The Atlantic Family Live at Montreux. She afterwards provided vocals for various jazz and disco musicians such as Dazzle, Maynard Ferguson, Herbie Mann or Inner Life and throughout the 1980s, Cyndi Lauper, Change and Melba Moore.

In 1988 she co-wrote a song with Luther Vandross called "So Much Better Now" for Gregory Hines.

Together with New York City-based R&B band called Blyss she recorded "No Turning Back". Although not charted, it was picked by Billboard as a "recommended" piece of urban music.

Davis also had a minor role in the Matty Rich movie Straight Out of Brooklyn.

== Chart performance ==
Year	Title	Label	Peak chart positions			
Year	Title	Label	US	US D-Sales	US R&B	UK
1985	"So Smooth"	Urban Rock	―	9	―	―
1986	"No Turning Back"	Urban Rock	―	―	―	―
"—" denotes releases that did not chart

== Discography ==
=== Particular singles ===
"So Smooth"

12" single	1. "So Smooth" – 5:26; 2. "So Smooth" (instrumental) – 5:16; Label: Urban Rock; Written-by: Alan Palanker, Ray Arlen; Producer: Alan Palanker, Ray Arlen
