= Benny Gordon (singer) =

American singer

- Born: 1932; Estill, South Carolina, U.S.
- Died: December 24, 2008 (aged 77)
- Genres: Soul
- Occupations: Singer, songwriter and bandleader
- Instrument: Vocals
- Labels: RCA, Estill, Capitol

Benny Gordon (1932 – December 24, 2008) was an American soul and R&B singer who recorded from the early 1960s up to the 1970s. Some of his early efforts were as a member of Christian Harmonizers. Their recordings were credited to The Christian Harmonizers (Featuring B. Gordon). Later recordings were as Bennie Gordon and the Soul Brothers. In 1968, they had a single out on the RCA label, "What Is Soul" which was backed with "I Can't Turn You Loose".

Benny Gordon & the Soul Brothers were to appear at Trude Heller's regularly and in 1967 appeared there with Reparata & the Delrons Benny and the Soul Brothers even performed for the opening day of Trude Hellers Take V club that opened on December 18, 1970.

As a solo singer he released singles "True Love Is All I Need" on the Capitol label, "Gonna Give Her All The Love I Got" on Wand label and "Sugar Mama" (You Know You're My Baby) on the Estill label.

== Biography ==
Gordon was born and raised Estill, South Carolina. Along with his brother, Sammy Gordon, he was a member of the Christian Harmonizers, a gospel group. In the early 1960s they moved to Brooklyn. They later formed The Soul Brothers band. The line-up was, Benny Gordon lead vocals, Ronnie Grieco saxophone, Perry Smith drums. Other members were Austin, Aaron aka Shockey, Max and Tommy.

They became the house band at Trude Heller's club on Sixth Avenue in Greenwich Village.

By August 1967, the Paul Robinson produced "A Kiss to Build a Dream On" was released. Reviewed in the August 5 issue of Record World, and a four star pick, the reviewer noted the beat and lyric that would appeal to r&B fans. A pick on Radio WWIN, it was also getting a good reception around the country. It was also hitting on Radio WJLB in Detroit. Its progress was noted in the August 19 issue of Record World. The magazine noted it's heating up in Detroit and gaining ground in Baltimore. It was also a pick on Baltimore's WWIN.

In May 1968, Benny Gordon and the Soul Brothers released the album Tighten Up that featured the tracks "Tighten Up", "Hold On, I'm Comin'" and "Hang on Sloopy". It was reviewed in the June 8 issue of Billboard, and the June 25 issue of Record World. Also that year, his version of "Gonna Give You All the Love I Got" backed with Turn on Your Love Light" was released on Wand 1188. It was a four star pick in the August 17 issue of Record World with the reviewer saying it "Will be right for many boogalooers". It was reported in the 14 September issue of Record World that "Turn on Your Love Light" was breaking in New York City and Philadelphia. With "Gonna Give You All the Love I Got" getting attention, his band the Soul Brothers had released their own single, "Horsing Around" on Newmiss Records, a label distributed by Scepter Records.

== Personal life ==
Gordon is related to Sammy Gordon who fronted the group Sammy Gordon & the Hip Huggers who recorded "Upstairs On Boston Road", and an early version of Bobby Womack's "Breezin'" that George Benson would later have a hit with. Some sources credit them as cousins while others credit them as brothers.

== Death ==
He died on December 24, 2008, from an inoperable stomach tumor at the age of 77.

== Benny Gordon and the Soul Brothers discography ==
=== Singles ===
Singles
Title	Label and cat	Year	Notes #
"Camel Walk" / "Kansas City Woman"	Enrica 1015	1964 (c)	
"True Love Is All I Need" / "You Found A New Love"	Capitol 5367	1965	
"Up And Down" / (Get It) "Come And Get It"	RCA Victor 47–8953	1966	
"Greyhound Blues" / "In The Midnight Hour"	RCA Victor 47-9144	1967	
"What Is Soul" / "I Can't Turn You Loose"	RCA Victor 47-9194	1967	
"Kiss To Build A Dream On" / "It Comes And Goes"	RCA Victor 47-9270	1967	
"Soul Woman" / "All In My Mind"	RCA Victor 57-3453	1968	(Canada)

Albums
Title	Label and cat	Year	Notes #
Tighten Up	Hot Biscuit Disc ST 9100 (S)	1968	
What Is Soul?	RCA LSP-4063	1969	

Various artists, compilation albums
Title	Label and cat	Year	Track	Notes #
Just A Little Bit Of Soul	(RCA (Camden) INT 1014)	1969	"A Kiss To Build A Dream On"	
Kent Stop Dancing	Kent Records – KENT 029	1994	"Turn On Your Love Light"	
The Soul of a Man	Kent Records KENT 038	1985	"Crying Man"	

== Benny Gordon discography ==
Estill singles
Title	Label and cat	Year	Notes #
"Last Train To South Carolina" / "Don't Play It No More"	Estill BG 17		
"Give A Damn" (About Your Feller Man) / "Give A Damn" (About Your Feller Man)	Estill 565		
"So Much In Love" / "Lonely Man"	Estill 600		
"When I See Her, I'm Gonna Give Her All The Love I've Got" / "So Much In Love"	Estill 601		
"Soul Woman" (by The Charms) / "The Hold Bag" (The B. G. Soul Brothers)"	Estill 1000		
"Sugar Mama" (You Know You're My Baby) Pt1 / "Sugar Mama" (You Know You're My Baby) Pt2	Estill 1000		
"Suga Mama Suga Daddy" * / "La-La-La I am Falling In Love Again"**	Soul City U.S.A. A-931		* Arranged by The B-G-Soul Bros ** Arranged by – A. Jones – J. Hollis

Other singles
Title	Label and cat	Year	Notes #
"Running In And Out" / "Stealing In The Name Of The Lord"	Allendale 931 / 932		
"True Love Is All I Need" / "You Found A New Love"	Capitol 5367	1965	
"Gonna Give Her All The Love I Got" / "Turn On Your Love Light"	Wand WND 1188	1968	
"Give A Damn (About Your Fellow Man) Part I" / "Give A Damn (About Your Fellow Man) Part II"	Shadow 1012	1971	
"Give A Damn (About Your Fellow Man) Part I" / "Give A Damn (About Your Fellow Man) Part 2"	Phil-L.A. Of Soul 351	1971	
"Sugar Mama Part 1" / "Sugar Mama Part 2"	Deluxe 45–145	1972	

== Other ==
Act	Title	Label and cat	Year	Notes #
The Christian Harmonizers (Featuring B. Gordon)	"Brightly Bean" / "Every Song That I Sing"	Rae Cox 105	1962	
The Christian Harmonizers (Featuring B. Gordon)	"Look Back And Wonder" / "What Have You Done"	Rae Cox 121	1963	
Benny Gordon and the Days Of Our Life	"All The Way In With Jesus Or All The Way Out" / "We Didn't Know Who You Was Jesus"	Estill 931		

Publication or website	Release / post date	Article title	Page / section	Link
Soul Detective	12/6/06	THREE GEMS 114 to ESTILL 1000 B	11/16/06	link
