= Don't You Miss Me a Little Bit Baby =

Single by Jimmy Ruffin

from the album Ruff 'n' Ready
- B-side: "I Want Her Love"
- Released: 29 June 1967
- Recorded: May 1967
- Genre: Soul
- Label: Soul (Motown); S 35035; Tamla Motown (UK); TMG 617
- Songwriter(s): Norman Whitfield, Barrett Strong, Rodger Penzabene
- Producer(s): Norman Whitfield

Jimmy Ruffin singles chronology
"Gonna Give Her All the Love I've Got" (1967)	"Don't You Miss Me a Little Bit Baby" (1967)	"I'll Say Forever My Love" (1967)

"Don't You Miss Me a Little Bit Baby" is a 1967 soul song originally recorded by Motown singer Jimmy Ruffin and released on the company's Soul subsidiary label.

== Details ==
The track was written by Norman Whitfield and Barrett Strong, Motown's hit songwriting duo responsible for many of the company's late '60s and early '70s classics. The song was also co-written by lyricist Rodger Penzabene, who drew inspiration from his real-life heart break over learning that his wife had been unfaithful. Penzabene was also responsible for several similarly-themed hit songs for The Temptations, including "I Wish It Would Rain" and "I Could Never Love Another (After Loving You)", but, unable to handle the extreme pain and unable to leave his wife, committed suicide on New Year's Eve 1967.

Jimmy Ruffin recorded the song in May 1967, and it was released as a single in June the same year. It became a minor hit on the US Pop Charts, reaching No. 68, and made the Top 30 on the R&B Charts, peaking at No. 27. It was also released as a single in Britain, by Tamla Motown, but failed to chart. Ruffin would, however, find considerably more success on the UK Charts, and would amass a total of 6 UK Top Ten hits over his career. His signature tune, "What Becomes of the Brokenhearted", made No. 8 in 1966, and performed even better upon its rerelease in 1974, reaching No. 4. "Don't You Miss Me a Little Bit Baby" was released as the B-side to "Brokenhearted" when it was reissued in 1974.

== Covers ==
Fellow Motown singer Marvin Gaye recorded the song in September 1969. Gaye's version, more uptempo and in a funky psychedelic soul style, was included on his That's The Way Love Is album, released in January 1970. Marvin Gaye also recorded a version of Jimmy Ruffin's "Gonna Give Her All the Love I've Got" for the same album, and it was a modest hit of its own, making No. 67 and No. 26 on the US Pop and R&B Charts respectively. Gladys Knight & the Pips also recorded "Don't You Miss Me a Little Bit Baby", in early 1968. Their version was more in keeping with the original by Jimmy Ruffin and was released as a track on their Feelin' Bluesy album from the same year. Jamaican star Delroy Wilson also covered the song, under the title "Who Cares."

== Personnel ==
=== Jimmy Ruffin version ===
- Lead vocals by Jimmy Ruffin
- Background vocals by The Originals and The Andantes
- Instrumentation by The Funk Brothers

=== Marvin Gaye version ===
- Lead vocals by Marvin Gaye
- Instrumentation by The Funk Brothers

=== Gladys Knight and The Pips version ===
- Lead vocals by Gladys Knight
- Background vocals by Merald "Bubba" Knight, Edward Patten, and William Guest
- Instrumentation by The Funk Brothers

=== Delroy Wilson version ===
- Lead vocals by Delroy Wilson
