= What Becomes of the Brokenhearted =

1966 single by Jimmy Ruffin

- Cover of the single released in the Netherlands

Single by Jimmy Ruffin

from the album Jimmy Ruffin Sings Top Ten
- B-side: "Baby, I've Got It"
- Released: June 3, 1966
- Recorded: February 1966
- Studio: Hitsville USA (Studio A)
- Genre: Soul
- Length: 3:00
- Label: Soul; S 35022
- Songwriters: William Weatherspoon; Paul Riser; James Dean
- Producers: William Weatherspoon; William "Mickey" Stevenson

Jimmy Ruffin singles chronology
"As Long as There Is L-O-V-E" (1965)	"What Becomes of the Brokenhearted" (1966)	"I've Passed This Way Before" (1966)

"What Becomes of the Brokenhearted" is a hit single recorded by Jimmy Ruffin and released on Motown Records' Soul label in the summer of 1966. It is a ballad about people suffering from broken hearts after their lovers leave them.

The tune was written by William Weatherspoon, Paul Riser, and James Dean, and the recording was produced by Weatherspoon and William "Mickey" Stevenson. "What Becomes of the Brokenhearted" remains one of the most-revived of Motown's hits.

Composers Weatherspoon and Riser and lyricist Dean had originally written "What Becomes of the Brokenhearted" with the intention of having the Spinners, then an act on Motown's V.I.P. label, record it. Jimmy Ruffin, older brother of Temptations lead singer David Ruffin, persuaded Dean to let him do the tune, as its anguished lyric about a man lost in the misery of heartbreak resonated with him.

Ruffin's lead vocal is augmented by the instrumentation of Motown's in-house studio band, the Funk Brothers, and the joint backing vocals of Motown session singers the Originals and the Andantes. "What Becomes of the Brokenhearted" peaked at No. 7 on the Billboard Hot 100 and at No. 6 on the Billboard R&B Singles chart, as well as No. 8 on the UK Singles Chart. Eight years later, the song was reissued (with a B-side of Ruffin's minor US hit "Don't You Miss Me a Little Bit Baby"), and surpassed its original UK chart position, reaching No. 4, and thus making it his highest-placed chart single in the UK.

The song originally featured a spoken introduction by Ruffin, similar in style to many of Lou Rawls' performances at the time. The spoken verse was removed from the final mix, hence the unusually long instrumental intro on the released version. The spoken verse is present on the alternative mix from the UK 2003 release Jimmy Ruffin – The Ultimate Motown Collection, and as a new stereo extended mix on the 2005 anthology, The Motown Box:

A world filled with love is a wonderful sight.
Being in love is one's heart's delight.
But that look of love isn't on my face.
That enchanted feeling has been replaced.

== Personnel ==
- Lead vocals by Jimmy Ruffin
- Background vocals by the Originals (Freddie Gorman, Walter Gaines, Hank Dixon, C.P. Spencer) and the Andantes (Jackie Hicks, Marlene Barrow, Louvain Demps)
- Instrumentation by the Funk Brothers
- String arrangements by Paul Riser

== Charts ==
=== Weekly charts ===
1966 weekly chart performance for "What Becomes of the Brokenhearted"
Chart (1966)	Peak position
Canada RPM Top Singles	12
France	2
UK Singles Chart	8
US Billboard Hot 100	7
US Billboard R&B	6
US Cash Box Top 100	9
US Record World	7

1974 weekly chart performance for "What Becomes of the Brokenhearted"
Chart (1974)	Peak position
Ireland (IRMA)	20
UK	4

=== Year-end charts ===
1966 year-end chart performance for "What Becomes of the Brokenhearted"
Chart (1966)	Rank
US Billboard Hot 100	3
US Cash Box Top 100	36

1974 year-end chart performance for "What Becomes of the Brokenhearted"
Chart (1974)	Rank
UK	44

== Certifications ==
Certifications for "What Becomes of the Brokenhearted"
Region	Certification	Certified units/sales
United Kingdom (BPI)	Gold	400,000^{‡}
^{‡} Sales+streaming figures based on certification alone.

== Licensed uses ==
=== Film and television ===
In 1990, the song was used in The Wonder Years Season 3 episode "The St. Valentine's Day Massacre", where Kevin Arnold picks up a Valentine's Day card meant for Winnie Cooper and realises he has genuine feelings for her.

In the military procedural series JAG (Season 3, Episode 15 – February 1998) this song was used at the end of the episode, as Mac, Harm and Bud all sing it together at a pub.

In 2009, the song was used during the closing credits of the French film La Famille Wolberg.

In 2019 HBO's Big Little Lies used the song in the first episode of the second season.

In 2019 Apple TV+’s For All Mankind used the song during the first episode of the first season.

In 2026, the song was used in the official trailer for DC Studios' Supergirl.

== Paul Young version ==
"What Becomes of the Brokenhearted"
- US retail cassette single; the US CD release was promo-only

Single by Paul Young

from the album Fried Green Tomatoes: Original Motion Picture Soundtrack
- B-side: "Ghost Train (Main Title)"
- Released: January 1992
- Genre: Pop, blue-eyed soul
- Label: MCA
- Songwriters: William Weatherspoon; Paul Riser; James Dean

Paul Young singles chronology
"Oh Girl" (1990)	"What Becomes of the Brokenhearted" (1992)	"Now I Know What Made Otis Blue" (1993)

A 1991 cover by Paul Young was featured in the film Fried Green Tomatoes. During the winter of 1992, his version reached No. 22 on the US Billboard Hot 100 and No. 8 Cash Box, becoming Young's third No. 1 song on the US adult contemporary chart (following "Everytime You Go Away" and "Oh Girl"). It was a bigger hit in Canada, reaching No. 6 pop and No. 1 Adult Contemporary.

=== Chart history ===
==== Weekly charts ====
Chart (1992)	Peak position
Canada RPM Adult Contemporary	1
Canada RPM Top Singles	6
New Zealand (RIANZ)	46
US Billboard Hot 100	22
US Billboard Adult Contemporary	1
US Cash Box Top 100	8

==== Year-end charts ====
Chart (1992)	Rank
Canada RPM-100 Singles	65
US Adult Contemporary (Billboard)	18
US (Joel Whitburn's Pop Annual)	114

== Other versions ==
- Andy Mackay recorded the song for his 1974 album In Search of Eddie Riff.
- Tom Jones recorded the song for his 1979 album Rescue Me.
- Ruffin recorded an Italian version of the song, titled "Se decidi così" ("If You Decide So").
- A 1981 version by Dave Stewart on synth and vocals by Zombies singer Colin Blunstone on Stiff reached No. 13 in the UK.
- Robson & Jerome's version spent two weeks at number-one on the UK Singles Chart in 1996.
- Pop group Westlife also covered the song. It was released as the B-side of the single "What Makes a Man" in December 2000.
- Singer Joan Osborne recorded the song with the Funk Brothers for the soundtrack of the 2002 film Standing in the Shadows of Motown. The track also appeared on Osborne's 2007 album Breakfast in Bed.
- Singer Frankie Valli recorded and released his version of the song on his 2007 album Romancing the 60s.
- Singer-songwriter Bruce Springsteen recorded the song for his 2022 album, Only the Strong Survive.
- Musician Russell Hitchcock of Australian duo Air Supply recorded the song for his 1988 debut solo album, Russell Hitchcock.
