= Jimmy Ruffin =

American singer (1936–2014)

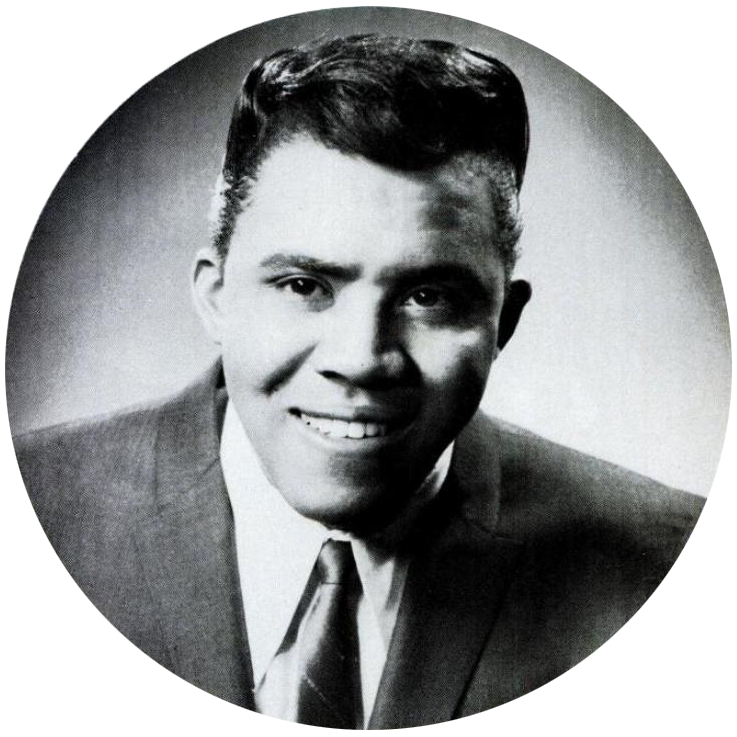
- Ruffin in 1964

Background information
- Born: Jimmy Lee Ruffin; May 7, 1936; Collinsville, Mississippi, U.S.
- Died: November 17, 2014 (aged 78) Las Vegas, Nevada, U.S.
- Genres: Soul; R&B; pop
- Occupation: Singer
- Instrument: Vocals
- Years active: 1955–2014
- Labels: Soul (Motown); Polydor; RSO; EMI; Motorcity

Jimmy Lee Ruffin (May 7, 1936 – November 17, 2014) was an American soul singer, and the older brother of David Ruffin, the lead singer of the Temptations. He had several hit records between the 1960s and 1980s, the most successful being the Top 10 hits "What Becomes of the Brokenhearted" and "Hold On (To My Love)".

== Biography ==
=== Early life ===
Jimmy Ruffin was born in 1936 in Collinsville, Mississippi, to Eli, a sharecropper, and Ophelia Ruffin. He was approaching his fifth birthday when his younger brother David was born. As children, the brothers began singing with a gospel group, the Dixie Nightingales.

In 1961, Jimmy became a singer as part of the Motown stable, mostly on sessions but also recording singles for its subsidiary Miracle label, but was then drafted for national service. After leaving the Army in 1964, he returned to Motown, where he was offered the opportunity to join the Temptations to replace Elbridge Bryant. However, after hearing his brother David, they hired him for the job instead so Jimmy decided to resume his solo career. Ruffin recorded for Motown's subsidiary Soul label, but with little success.

=== Career ===
In 1966, he heard a song about unrequited love written for The Spinners and persuaded the writers that he should record it himself. His recording of "What Becomes of the Brokenhearted" became a major success. The song reached No. 7 on the Billboard Hot 100 and No. 6 on the R&B Chart. It also initially reached No. 8 in the UK Singles Chart, rising to No. 4 when it was reissued in the UK in 1974. "What Becomes of the Brokenhearted" remains Ruffin's best-known song. It was the lead single from his debut album Jimmy Ruffin Sings Top Ten (released as The Jimmy Ruffin Way in the UK), which was released on the Motown's Soul subsidiary label in 1967. Follow-up singles in America were successful, with "I've Passed This Way Before" and "Gonna Give Her All The Love I've Got" in late 1966 and early 1967.

Ruffin's second album, Ruff 'n' Ready, was released in 1969. It contained the song "Don't You Miss Me a Little Bit Baby", which made the lower parts of the Billboard Hot 100 (No. 68) and was a Top 30 hit on the R&B Chart, peaking at No. 27. As a solo artist, it would prove to be Ruffin's last significant chart appearance in America for many years, and his last significant charting record for Motown in the US. The song was also released as the B-side to "What Becomes of the Brokenhearted" when it was reissued in 1974.

As Ruffin found success in the United States difficult to sustain, he began to concentrate instead on the British market. In 1970, "Farewell Is a Lonely Sound", "I'll Say Forever My Love" and "It's Wonderful (To Be Loved by You)" each made the UK Top Ten, and he was voted the world's top singer in one British poll. He also teamed up with brother David to record the album I Am My Brother's Keeper, a modestly successful 1970 album for Motown that included the songs "When The Love Hand Comes Down", "Your Love Was Worth Waiting For" and a cover of Ben E. King's "Stand by Me". His third solo album for the label, The Groove Governor, was released in 1970, and did not fare as well as his previous two albums.

Following the success of his initial hits, Ruffin found it hard to maintain an identity, as most of his songs were later covered by other Motown artists, most prominently "Everybody Needs Love", a hit when covered by Gladys Knight & the Pips for their 1967 debut album of the same name, "Maria (You Were The Only One)", a hit for Michael Jackson and "If You Let Me," a minor hit for Eddie Kendricks. In addition, he had recorded the first version of The Temptations hit "Beauty Is Only Skin Deep".

He then left Motown, and recorded for the Polydor and Chess labels, where he recorded "Tell Me What You Want." In 1980, Robin Gibb and Blue Weaver produced his album Sunrise and the hit single "Hold On To My Love", which reached No. 10 in the US and No. 7 in the UK, on the RSO label.

In the 1980s, Ruffin moved to live in Great Britain, where he continued to perform successfully. In December 1984 he collaborated with Paul Weller of The Jam and The Style Council for his benefit single "Soul Deep", produced to raise money for the families of striking miners affected by the UK miners' strike. This went under the name of The Council Collective and Jimmy appeared with Paul on Radio 1 to say he is involved because his father worked down the mines and "he understands the suffering."

In 1986 he collaborated with the British pop group Heaven 17, singing "A Foolish Thing to Do" and "My Sensitivity" on a 12" EP record. In 1987, Ruffin recorded "Easy Just To Say I Love You", which was written by Peter Marsh, Mae McKenna and Julian Marshall. He took part in recording for Ian Levine's Motown revival label, Motorcity Records, in the late 1980s and early 1990s. He recorded duets with both Maxine Nightingale and Brenda Holloway. Later, Ruffin hosted a radio show in the UK for a time, and became an anti-drug advocate following the 1991 drug overdose death of his brother David. Ruffin was portrayed by Lamman Rucker in the 1998 mini-series The Temptations.

=== Later life and death ===
Following the 2010 release - on CD for the first time - of his 1970 album I Am My Brother's Keeper, Ruffin had been writing and recording songs for a new album that he had planned to release during 2013. It was not finished at the time of his death.

In 2012, a compilation album titled There Will Never Be Another You, including his hit songs "What Becomes of the Brokenhearted", and "Hold On To My Love", had been released.

Ruffin lived in the area of Las Vegas, Nevada. On October 17, 2014, it was reported that he was gravely ill and had been taken into an intensive care unit at a Las Vegas hospital. He died on November 17, 2014, in Las Vegas, aged 78.

Ruffin is buried at Palm Memorial Park Northwest Cemetery, Las Vegas, Clark County, Nevada in the Garden of Eternal Life Section.

=== Family ===
His siblings were Davis Eli (David), Reada May (Marie), Rosine, and Quincy B (all deceased). His children are Arlet, Philicia, Jimmie Ray (deceased), Jimmy Jr., Ophelia, Camilla and Jimmie Ray Vaughn.

== Discography ==
- Sunrise (1980)
