= Motorcity Records singles discography =

This is a discography for singles released by Motorcity Records.

== Nightmare 12" singles ==
Singles with the MARE-prefix released on Ian Levine's label Nightmare Records (7" singles had the prefix MARES) before the label was re-named Motorcity Records. Subsequent 12" singles carried the MOTC-prefix (7" singles 7MOTC) .

- ◄ NRG 8 - Scherrie Payne - "Chasing Me Into Somebody Else's Arms" (Nightmare Gold, 1987)
- MARE 1 - Evelyn Thomas - "Tightrope" (1986)
- MARE 2 - Darryl Pandy - "Animal Magnetism" (1986)
- MARE 3 - Man Two Man - "Who Knows What Evil" (1986)
- MARE 4 - Earlene Bentley - "Don't Delay" (1986)
- MARE 5 - Miquel Brown - "Footprints in the Sand" (1986)
- MARE 6 - James & Susan Wells - "Love's the Cure for Me" (1986)
- MARE 7 - Viola Wills & Noel McCalla - "Take One Step Forward" (1986)
- MARE 8 - Barbara Pennington - "Don't Stop the World" (1986)
- MARE 9 - Linda Taylor - "Every Waking Hour" (1986)
- MARE 10 - Shezwae Powell - "Act of War" (1986)
- MARE 11 - Midnight Sunrise featuring Jackie Rawe - "In at the Deep End" (1986)
- MARE 12 - Celena Duncan - "Faster Than the Eye Can See" (1986)
- MARE 13 - Steve Mancha - "Standing in Line" (1986)
- MARE 14 - Grace Kennedy - "Take It or Leave It" (1986)
- MARE 15 - Milton Brown - "Falling from a Great Height" (1987)
- MARE 16 - Archie Bell & the Drells - "Look Back Over Your Shoulder" (1987)
- MARE 17 - Moonstone - "Meet Me Halfway" (1987)
- MARE 18 - Susan Wells - "My Hands Are Tied" (1987)
- MARE 19 - Man Two Man - "Hard-Hitting Love" (1987)
- MARE 20 - Nicci Gable - "Indian Giver" (1987)
- MARE 21 - Earlene Bentley - "I Got You Covered" (1987)
- MARE 22 - James Wells - "Great Minds Think Alike" (1987)
- MARE 23 - Louise Thomas - "Double Vision" (1987)
- MARE 24 - Scott Stryker - "Less Than Lovers More Than Friends" (1987)
- MARE 25 - Seventh Avenue - "Armed Robbery" (1987)
- MARE 26 - Kim Weston - "Signal Your Intention" (1987)
- MARE 27 - Darryl Pandy - "Put My Love on the Line" (1987)
- MARE 28 - The Velvelettes - "Needle in a Haystack" (1987)
- MARE 29 - Carol Jiani - "Turning My Back and Walking Away" (1987)
- MARE 30 - Marv Johnson and Carolyn Gill - "Ain't Nothing Like the Real Thing" (1987)
- MARE 31 - Evelyn Thomas - "Standing at the Crossroads" (1987)
- MARE 32 - Sharon Dee Clarke - "Past, Present & Future" (1987)
- MARE 33 - Mary Wells - "Don't Burn Your Bridges" (1987)
- MARE 34 - Shezwae Powell - "Backtrack" (1987)
- MARE 35 - Celena Duncan - "Questions & Answers" (1987)
- MARE 36 - Midnight Sunrise with Nellie 'Mixmaster' Rush* - "This Is A Haunted House" (1987)
- MARE 37 - Milton Brown - "A Winner Never Quits" (1987)
- MARE 38 - Rob Keane - "Perfect Opportunity" (1987)
- MARE 39 - Mary Wilson - "Don't Get Mad, Get Even" (1987)
- MARE 40 - Croisette - "Wasted Nights" (1987)
- MARE 41 - Marsha Raven - "That Jealous Sensation" (1987)
- MARE 42 - Norma Lewis - "Surprise Me Tonight" (1987)
- MARE 43 - Moonstone - "Spring Summer Autumn Winter" (1987)
- MARE 44 - Sharon Dee Clarke - "Awesome" (1987)
- MARE 45 - Rob Keane - "One Night Stand" (1987)
- MARE 46 - Havana - "Satisfy My Desire" (1987)
- MARE 47 - Seventh Avenue - "The Right Combination" (1987)
- MARE 48 - Evelyn Thomas - "No Win Situation" (1987)
- MARE 49 - Barbara Pennington - "There Are Brighter Days" (1987)
- MARE 50 - Steve Mancha - "Hopelessly" (1987)
- MARE 51 - Marv Johnson - "By Hook or by Crook" (1988)
- MARE 52 - Shezwae Powell - "Ain't No Mountain High Enough" (1988)
- MARE 53 - Brenda Holloway - "Give Me a Little Inspiration" (1988)
- MARE 54 - Croisette - "You're a Time Waster" (1988)
- MARE 55 - Kim Weston - "Helpless" (1988)
- MARE 56 - Seventh Avenue - "The Love I Lost" (1988)
- MARE 57 - Scott Stryker - "Science Fiction" (1988)
- MARE 58 - Monica Reed - "Out of Control" (1988)
- MARE 59 - Jimmy Ruffin - "Wake Me Up When It's Over" (1988)
- MARE 60 - The Velvelettes - "Running Out of Luck" (1988)
- MARE 61 - Eastbound Expressway - "Whiplash" (1988)
- MARE 62 - Louise Thomas - "I Can Fly" (1988)
- MARE 63 - Jigsaw - "Let's Not Say Goodbye" (1988)
- MARE 64 - Lily Savage - "Tough at the Top" (1988)
- MARE 65 - Evelyn Thomas - "Only Once in a Lifetime" (1988)
- MARE 66 - Carol Woods - "Never Satisfied" (1988)
- MARE 67 - Desiderata - "Heart of Glass (1988)
- MARE 68 - Midnight Sunrise - "Goodbye Good Riddance" (1988)
- MARE 69 - Barbara Pennington - "I've Been a Bad Girl" (1988)
- MARE 70 - Gee Morris - "This Old Heart of Mine (1988)
- MARE 71 - Sharon Dee Clarke - "I Can't Stay Mad At You" (1988)
- MARE 72 - Kim Weston - "Who's Gonna Have the Last Laugh" (1988)
- MARE 73 - Jimmy Ruffin & Brenda Holloway - "On the Rebound" (1988)
- MARE 74 - Laura Pallas - "Revenge Is Sweet" (1989)
- MARE 75 - Celena Duncan - "Running for the Moon (1989)
- MARE 76 - Croisette - "Do You Know the Way to San José?" (1989)
- MARE 77 - Seventh Avenue - "Standing By Your Side" (1989)
- MARE 78 - Brenda Reid & The New Exciters - "Reaching for the Best" (1989)
- MARE 79 - Miquel Brown - "This Time It's Real" (1989)
- MARE 80 - Evelyn Thomas - "This Is Madness" (1989)
- MARE 81 - Jigsaw - "Strategy" (1989)
- MARE 82 - Bobby Taylor & the Vancouvers - "Do Unto Others" (1989)
- MARE 83 - Pearly Gates - "One Less Bell to Answer" (1989)
- MARE 84 - Kevin Moore - "You Spin My World Around" (1989)
- MARE 85 - Scherrie Payne - "Pure Energy" (1989)
- MARE 86 - The Flirtations - "Back On My Feet Again" (1989)
- MARE 87 - "Moonstone" - The Visitors (1989)
- MARE 88 - The Nightmare Orchestra - "Street Symphony" (1989)
- MARE 89 - Barbara Randolph - "I Got a Feeling" / "Turning My Back and Walking Away" (1989)
- MARE 90 -
- MARE 91 - Eddie Holman - "Whatever Happened to Our Melody?" (1989)
- MARE 92 - The Elgins - "Heaven Must Have Sent You" (1989)
- MARE 93 -
- MARE 94 - Choker Campbell - "After Dark" (1989)
- MARE 95 - Boys Town Gang - "Wanted for Murder" - (1989)
- MARE 96 - C. P. Spencer - "One Heart for Hire" (1989)
- MARE 97 - The Andantes - "Lightning Never Strikes Twice" (1989)
- MARE 98 - Angie Gold - "Right Back in the Middle" - (1989)
- MARE 99 - Richard "Popcorn" Wylie - "Love Is My Middle Name" (1989)
- MARE 100 -
- MARE 101 -
- MARE 102 - Sylvia Moy - "Major Investment" (1989)
- MARE 103 - Chuck Jackson - "All Over the World" (1989) - UK Pop: #85
- MARE 104 - Hattie Littles - "Running a Fever" (1989)
- MARE 105 - Marv Johnson - "Run Like a Rabbit" (1989)
- MARE 106 - Ivy Jo Hunter - "Eyewitness News" (1989)
- MARE 107 -
- MARE 108 -
- MARE 109 -
- MARE 110 - Frankie Gaye and Kim Weston - "It Takes Two" (1989)
- MARE 111 - Bobby Glenn - "Bad Connection" (1989)
- MARE 112 -
- MARE 113 - Rocq-e Harrell - "My Heart Keeps Beating Faster" (1989)
- MARE 114 -
- MARE 115 - Caroline Crawford - "Timeless" (1989)
- MARE 116 - The Velvelettes - "Pull My Heartstrings" (1989)
- MARE 117 - Earl Van Dyke - "Detroit City" (1989)

== Motorcity 12" singles ==
Unissued singles are marked with (NR) for "not released".'

- MOTC 1 - Billy Griffin - "First in Line" (1989)
- MOTC 2 - Mary Wells - "You're the Answer to My Dreams" (1989)
- MOTC 3 - Sisters Love - "No More Broken Hearts" (1989)
- MOTC 4 - Syreeta - "If the Shoe Fits" (1989)
- MOTC 5 - Sammy Ward - "If at First You Don't Succeed" (1989)
- MOTC 6 - The Motorcity All Stars feat. Levi Stubbs - "I Can't Help Myself (Sugar Pie Honey Bunch)" (1989)
- MOTC 7 - Mary Wilson - "Ooh Child" (1989)
- MOTC 8 - The Fantastic Four - "Working on a Building of Love" (1989)
- MOTC 9 - Carolyn Crawford - "Timeless" (1989)
- MOTC 10 - Edwin Starr - "Let's Fall in Love Tonight" (1989)
- MOTC 11 - Martha Reeves and the Vandellas - "Step Into My Shoes" (1989)
- MOTC 12 - Kim Weston - "Emotion" (1989)
- MOTC 13 - Jean, Scherrie & Lynda of The Supremes - "Crazy 'Bout the Guy" (1989)
- MOTC 14 - The Valadiers - "Truth Hurts" (1990)
- MOTC 15 - Claudette Robinson - "Hurry Up" (1990)
- MOTC 16 - The Marvelettes - "Holding On With Both Hands" (1989)
- MOTC 17 - Freddie Gorman - "I Just Keep Falling in Love" (1990)
- MOTC 18 - Joe Stubbs - "Destination Unknown" (1989)
- MOTC 19 - G. C. Cameron - "It's a Shame" (1989)
- MOTC 20 - The Contours - "Face Up to the Fact" (1989)
- MOTC 21 - Johnny Bristol - "Man Up in the Sky" (1989)
- MOTC 22 - The Monitors - "Standing Still" (1990)
- MOTC 23 - Frankie Gaye - "Extraordinary Girl" (1989)
- MOTC 24 - Frances Nero - "Footsteps Following Me" (1990) - UK Pop: #17
- MOTC 25 - J. J. Barnes - "Build a Foundation" (1990)
- MOTC 26 - Chuck Jackson - "Relight My Fire" (1990)
- MOTC 27 - Chris Clark - "From Head to Toe" (1991)
- MOTC 28 - Liz Lands - "Starting All Over Again" (1991)
- MOTC 29 - Hattie Littles - "You're the First, the Last, My Everything" (1990)
- MOTC 30 - Herman Griffin - "Not One Chance in a Million" (1990)
- MOTC 31 - Rare Earth - "Love Is Here and Now You're Gone" (1990)
- MOTC 32 - The Satintones - "Perfect Combination" (1990)
- MOTC 33 - David Ruffin - "Hurt the One You Love" (1990)
- MOTC 34 - Saundra Edwards - "Tell a Fool Goodbye" (1990)
- MOTC 35 - Ronnie McNeir - "Keep On Giving Me Love" / "You're My Lucky Number" (1991)
- MOTC 36 - Sherri Taylor - "Weakhearted" (1991)
- MOTC 37 - Three Ounces of Love - "Newsy Neighbours" (1991)
- MOTC 38 - Martha Reeves & G. C. Cameron - "You're All I Need to Get By" (1990)
- MOTC 39 - Bettye LaVette - "Surrender" / "Time Won't Change This Love" (1990)
- MOTC 40 - Lois Reeves - "Patience Is a Virtue" (1991)
- MOTC 41 - Edwin Starr - "Breaking Down the Walls of Heartache" / "You Made a Believer Out of Me" (1990)
- MOTC 42 - Jean, Scherrie & Lynda of The Supremes - "Stoned Love" / "Crazy 'Bout the Guy (Live)" (1990)
- MOTC 43 - The Elgins - "It's Sensational" / "Take the Train" (1992)
- MOTC 44 - Beans Bowles & The Swinging Tygers - "Motorcity Magic" (1992)
- MOTC 45 - The Contours - "Running in Circles" (1991)
- MOTC 46 - G. C. Cameron - "Good Times Up Ahead" (1990)
- MOTC 47 - Johnny Bristol - "Keep This Thought in Mind" (1990)
- MOTC 48 - Kim Weston - "My Heart's Not Made of Stone" (1990)
- MOTC 49 - Lynda Laurence - "Living With a Married Man" / "If This World Were Mine" (1992)
- MOTC 50 - Marv Johnson - "Come to Me" (1990)
- MOTC 51 - The Velvelettes - "It Keeps Reminding Me (Of Happy Memories)" / "That's When the Tears Start" (1992)
- MOTC 52 - The Miracles - "Love Machine" (1990)
- MOTC 53 - The Undisputed Truth - "Law of the Land" (1991)
- MOTC 54 - Barbara McNair - "Face to Face With Love" (1990)
- MOTC 55 - Billy Preston & Syreeta - "Watching the Hands of Time" (1991)
- MOTC 56 - Brenda Holloway - "Hot and Cold" (1991)
- MOTC 57 - Earl Van Dyke - "Let the music take you away"
- MOTC 58 - Jean, Scherrie & Lynda of The Supremes & The Originals - "Back By Popular demand" (NR)
- MOTC 59 - Lovetones - "Turn this heart around" / "Fire alarm" (NR)
- MOTC 60 - Mable John - "Time Stops" (1991)
- MOTC 61 - The Miracles - "Fun Time" (1992)
- MOTC 62 - P. J. - "Down for the Third Time" (NR)
- MOTC 63 - Pete Hoorelbeke - "Talk to the World" (NR)
- MOTC 64 - The Valadiers - "What's Wrong With Me Baby" (NR)
- MOTC 65 - Vee - "You're My Loveline" (NR)
- MOTC 66 - Susaye Greene - "Stop I Need You Now" (1990)
- MOTC 67 - Edwin Starr - "25 Miles" / "You Made a Believer Out of Me" (1990)
- MOTC 68 - Richard "Popcorn" Wylie - "See This Man in Love" (1990)
- MOTC 69 - Frankie Gaye - "My Brother" / "Cross That Bridge" (1990)
- MOTC 70 - Ortheia Barnes - "Without Your Love" / "Love Changes" (NR)
- MOTC 71 - The Marvelettes - "Hey What's Your Name" (1990)
- MOTC 72 - Billy Griffin - "Technicolour" (1991)
- MOTC 73 - Linda Griner - "Too Late for Tears" (1991)
- MOTC 74 - Vermettya Royster - "Give Me Your Love" (1991)
- MOTC 75 - Hattie Littles - "Waiting for the Day" (1991)
- MOTC 76 - Pat Lewis - "No Right Turn" (1991)
- MOTC 77 - Jean, Scherrie & Lynda of The Supremes - "I Want to Be Loved" (1991)
- MOTC 78 - Joe Stubbs - "You're My Eternity" (1991)
- MOTC 79 - Susaye Greene - "Free" (1991)
- MOTC 80 - Frances Nero - "Making My Daydream Real" / "Nowhere to Go But Up" (1991)
- MOTC 81 - Ronnie McNeir - "Take the First Step" / "Wholeheartedly" (1991)
- MOTC 82 - Edwin Starr - "Just Another Fool in Love" / "Writing On The Wall" (1991)
- MOTC 83 - Bettye LaVette - "Good Luck" (1991)
- MOTC 84 - Jake Jacas - "You Can't Turn Back" (1992)
- MOTC 85 - Billy Preston - "You Are the Rhythm in My Life" (NR)
- MOTC 86 - Hattie Littles - "I've Never Found a Man (To Love Me Like You Do)" / "Ten Per Cent" (NR)
- MOTC 87 - J. J. Barnes - "I've Seen the Light" (1991)
- MOTC 88 - The Supremes - "Hit and Miss" (1991)
- MOTC 89 - G. C. Cameron - "No Need to Explain" (1992)
- MOTC 90 - Frances Nero - "You're the Push Behind Me" / "Somebody's Eyes" (NR)
- MOTC 91 - Ivy Jo Hunter - "Running Through My Fingers" (NR)
- MOTC 92 - Barbara McNair - "Talking in My Sleep" (NR)
- MOTC 93 - Billy Eckstine - "Got the Big City Blues" (NR)
- MOTC 94 - Scherrie Payne - "One More Time" / "Who's Wrong Who's Right" (NR)
- MOTC 95 - Blinky - "Good for Nothing" (NR)
- MOTC 96 - Karen Pree - "Girl With a Broken Heart" (1992)
- MOTC 97 - Billy Griffin - "True Confessions" (1992)
- MOTC 98 - Three Ounces of Love - "Evil One" / "Pain Reliever" (NR)
- MOTC 99 - Frankie Gaye - "I Feel It Too" / "Chrystal Ball" (NR)
- MOTC 100 - Various Artists - "Don't Forget the Motorcity" (NR)
- MOTC 101 - Jake Jacas - "Two Way Street" (NR)
- MOTC 102 - Ronnie McNeir - "Ten Times a Day" (NR)
- MOTC 103 - Barbara Randolph - "Soul Searching" / "Save Me Now" (1992)
- MOTC 104 - Edwin Starr - "Where Is the Sound" (1992)
- MOTC 105 - Pat Lewis - "(Ooh Wee Oooh) Sweetest Feeling" / "City Lights" (NR)
- MOTC 106 - The Marvelettes - "Secret Love Affair" / "Just in the Nick of Time" (1992)
- MOTC 107 - Martha Reeves and the Vandellas - "Angel in Disguise" (1992)
- MOTC 108 - Saundra Edwards - "Lovestruck" / "Tow-Away Zone" (NR)
- MOTC 109 - Lynda Laurence - "Fresh Out of Tears" (NR)
- MOTC 110 - J. J. Barnes - "On Top of the World" (NR)
- MOTC 111 - The Originals - "Take the Only Way Out" (NR)
- MOTC 112 - Sisters Love - "Saturday Night, Sunday Morning" (NR)
- MOTC 113 - Linda Griner - "Not This Time" (NR)
- MOTC 114 - Edwin Starr - "Darling Darling Baby" / "Wait for Me" (1992)
- MOTC 115 - The Contours - "Heaven Sent" (NR)
- MOTC 116 - Marv Johnson - "It's Magic Between Us" (NR)
- MOTC 117 - Mary Wells - "Walk the City Streets" (NR)
- MOTC 118 - The Andantes - "All Around the Motorcity" (NR)
- MOTC 119 - Jake Jacas - "Don't Know When to Dance" (NR)

== Sources ==
- Rateyourmusic.com
- Myspace.com
