= Motorcity Records albums discography =

This is a discography for albums released by Motorcity Records.

== Album discography ==
Unissued albums are marked with an (NR) for '"not released".

- MOTCLP 1 – Various Artists – Motortown Sound of Detroit Vol. 1 (1989)
- MOTCLP 2 – Various Artists – Motortown Sound of Detroit Vol. 2 (1990)
- MOTCLP 3 – Various Artists – Motortown Sound of Detroit Vol. 3 (1990)
- MOTCLP 4 – Various Artists – Motortown Sound of Detroit Vol. 4 (1990)
- CDMOTCLP 5 – Various Artists – Motortown Sound of Detroit Vol. 5 (1991)
- MOTCCD 6 – Various Artists – Motortown Sound of Detroit Vol. 6 (1992)
- MOTCCD 7 – Various Artists – Motortown Sound of Detroit Vol. 7 (1992)
- MOTCCD 8 – Various Artists – Motortown Sound of Detroit Vol. 8 (NR)
- MOTCCD 9 – Various Artists – Motortown Sound of Detroit Vol. 9 (NR)
- MOTCCD 10 – Various Artists – Motortown Sound of Detroit Vol. 10 (NR)
- MOTCLP 11 – Various Artists – Motorcity Soul Sampler Vol. 1 (1989)
- MOTCLP 12 – Various Artists – Motorcity Soul Sampler Vol. 2 (1990)
- MOTCLP 13 – Various Artists – Motorcity Soul Sampler Vol. 3 (1990)
- MOTCLP 14 – Various Artists – Motorcity Soul Sampler Vol. 4 (1990)
- MOTCCD 15 – Various Artists – Motorcity Soul Sampler Vol. 5 (NR)
- MOTCCD 16 – Various Artists – Motorcity Soul Sampler Vol. 6 (NR)
- MOTCCD 17 – Various Artists – Motorcity Soul Sampler Vol. 7 (NR)
- MOTCCD 18 – Various Artists – Motorcity Soul Sampler Vol. 8 (NR)
- MOTCCD 19 – Various Artists – Motorcity Soul Sampler Vol. 9 (NR)
- MOTCCD 20 – Various Artists – Motorcity Soul Sampler Vol. 10 (NR)
- MOTCLP 21 – Various Artists – 20 Detroit Chartbusters Vol. 1 (1990)
- MOTCLP 22 – Various Artists – Girl Groups Of The Motorcity (1990)
- MOTCLP 23 – Various Artists – 20 Detroit Chartbusters Vol. 2 (1990)
- CDMOTCLP 24 – Various Artists – 20 Detroit Chartbusters Vol. 3 (1991)
- MOTCLP 25 / CDMOTCLP 25 – Various Artists – Male Groups Of The Motorcity (1990)
- MOTCLP 26 / CDMOTCLP 26 – The Contours – Flashback (1990)
- MOTCCD 27 – Former Ladies of The Supremes – Bouncing Back (NR)
- MOTCLP 28 / CDMOTCLP 28 – The Monitors – Grazing In The Grass (1990)
- MOTCLP 29 / CDMOTCLP 29 – Kim Weston – Investigate (1990)
- MOTCCD 30 – Billy Griffin – Technicolour (NR)
- CDMOTCLP 31 – Various Artists – Motorcity Love Songs (1990)
- CDMOTCLP 32 – Various Artists – Motorcity Footstompers (1990)
- CDMOTCLP 33 – Various Artists – Motorcity Duets (1990)
- CDMOTCLP 34 – Various Artists – Motorcity Fingersnappers (1990)
- CDMOTCLP 35 – Various Artists – Motorcity Summer Swingbeats (1990)
- CDMOTCLP 36 – Various Artists – Motorcity Collector's Album (1990)
- MOTCLP 37 / CDMOTCLP 37 – Marv Johnson – Come To Me (1990)
- MOTCLP 38 / CDMOTCLP 38 – The Marvelettes – Now! (1990)
- MOTCLP 39 / CDMOTCLP 39 – The Elgins – Take The Train(1990)
- MOTCLP 40 / CDMOTCLP 40 – Mary Wells – Keeping My Mind On Love (1990)
- MOTCLP 41 / CDMOTCLP 41 – Various Artists – Motorcity Beach Music (1990)
- MOTCLP 42 / CDMOTCLP 42 – Carolyn Crawford – Heartaches (1990)
- MOTCLP 43 / CDMOTCLP 43 – The Velvelettes – One Door Closes (1990)
- MOTCLP 44 / CDMOTCLP 44 – Frances Nero – Out On The Floor (1991)
- CDMOTCLP 45 – Bettye LaVette – Not Gonna Happen Twice (1991)
- MOTCLP 46 / CDMOTCLP 46 – Bobby Taylor & the Vancouvers – Find My Way Back (1990)
- MOTCLP 47 / CDMOTCLP 47 – Various Artists – Mixed Groups Of The Motorcity (1991)
- MOTCLP 48 – Richard "Popcorn" Wylie – Lifeline (NR)
- CDMOTCLP 49 – G. C. Cameron – Right Or Wrong (1991)
- CDMOTCLP 50 – Hattie Littles – The Right Direction (1991)
- CDMOTCLP 51 – Various Artists – Divas (2CD, 1991)
- CDMOTCLP 52 – Various Artists – Garage Grooves Of Detroit (1991)
- CDMOTCLP 53 – Various Artists – Motorcity Blue-Eyed Soul – (1991)
- CDMOTCLP 54 – Various Artists – The Supreme Ladies (1991)
- CDMOTCLP 55 – Various Artists – Motorcity Magic (1991)
- CDMOTCLP 56 – Frankie Gaye – My Brother (1991)
- CDMOTCLP 57 – Various Artists – Nowhere To Run (1991)
- CDMOTCLP 58 – Various Artists – Soul Men Of Detroit (2CD, 1991)
- CDMOTCLP 59 – Brenda Holloway – All It Takes (1991)
- CDMOTCLP 60 – Linda Griner – Bitter End (1991)
- CDMOTCLP 61 – Various Artists – Cream Of The Crop (1991)
- CDMOTCLP 62 – Joe Stubbs – Round And Round (1991)
- MOTCCD 63 – Various Artists – Motorcity Ballads (1992)
- MOTCCD 64 – Various Artists – Uptight (1991)
- MOTCCD 65 – Pat Lewis – Separation (1991)
- MOTCCD 66 – Liz Lands – Stick Together (NR)
- MOTCCD 67 – Various Artists – Divas II (1991)
- MOTCCD 68 – The Andantes – Fire Power (NR)
- MOTCCD 69 – J. J. Barnes – Try It One More Time (1991)
- MOTCCD 70 – Various Artists – Motorcity Beach Party (1991)
- MOTCCD 71 – Frances Nero – Footsteps Following Me (1991)
- MOTCCD 72 – The Lovetones – Turn This Heart Around (1991)
- MOTCCD 73 – Edwin Starr – Where Is The Sound (1991)
- MOTCCD 74 – Jake Jacas – Two Way Street (NR)
- MOTCCD 75 – The Elgins – Sensational (1992)
- MOTCCD 76 – The Fantastic Four – Back In Circulation (1992)
- MOTCCD 77 – Saundra Edwards – Tow-Away Zone (NR)
- MOTCCD 78 – Various Artists – Cream OF The Crop, Vol. 2 (1992)
- MOTCCD 79 – Hattie Littles – Borderline (1992)
- MOTCCD 80 – Joe Stubbs – Pressure Point (1992)
- MOTCCD 81 – Various Artists – Tearing Up The Dancefloor (1992)
- MOTCCD 82 – Louvain Demps – Better Times (1992)
- MOTCCD 83 – Various Artists – Motorcity a GoGo (1992)
- MOTCCD 84 – Kim Weston – Talking Loud (NR)
- MOTCCD 85 – Various Artists – Motorcity Memories (1992)
- MOTCCD 86 – Barbara Randolph – Breaking Into My Heart (1992)
- MOTCCD 87 – Various Artists – Dancing In The Key Of Life (1992)
- MOTCCD 88 – The Contours – Revenge (NR)
- MOTCCD 99 – J. J. Barnes – Happy Road (NR)

== Sources ==
- http://rateyourmusic.com/label/motorcity/
- http://www.myspace.com/ian_levine
