= Can You Jerk Like Me =

Single by The Contours
- B-side: "That Day When She Needed Me"
- Released: 1964
- Recorded: Hitsville USA (Studio A); 1964
- Genre: Soul, Novelty song
- Length: 2:41
- Label: Gordy; G7037
- Songwriter(s): William Stevenson, Ivy Jo Hunter
- Producer(s): Stevenson & Hunter

The Contours singles chronology
"Can You Do It" (1964)	"Can You Jerk Like Me" (1964)	"First I Look at the Purse" (1965)

"Can You Jerk Like Me" (Gordy G7037) is a 1964 R&B song by Motown Records group The Contours, issued on its Gordy Records subsidiary. It charted on the Billboard Hot 100, reaching #47, and a Top 20 hit on its R&B chart, reaching #15. A single-only release, it did not appear on any original Contours studio album, as the group only had one album release during their five years on the label, 1962's "Do You Love Me (Now That I Can Dance)".

(Note: It has been recently revealed that this song was recorded for a planned, but unreleased, Contours album for Motown in 1964 entitled The Contours: Can You Dance (Gordy 910). This album was released, in modified form, by the import label, Kent Records, in 2011 under the name Dance With The Contours under license from Motown Records).

The song's flip side, the Smokey Robinson-written-and-produced "That Day When She Needed Me", which featured the original Contours before their departure, was also a hit, reaching #37 on the Cash Box R&B chart. Both songs have appeared on several Contours Motown compilation CD collections:

- An instrumental version of "Can You Jerk Like Me" (the original backing track), was released by Motown's house band Earl Van Dyke and The Funk Brothers (under the pseudonym 'Earl Van Dyke and The Soul Brothers' on their 1965 album That Motown Sound (Motown 631)
- Instrumental group The T-Bones also recorded a version of The Contours' "Can You Jerk Like Me", on their 1965 LP entitled Doin The Jerk.

== Background ==
A powerful, propulsive up-tempo rocker, tailor-made for Motown's dynamic Contours, this was one of several songs based on The Jerk, a popular 1960s dance craze. Led by Billy Gordon, one of the group's two lead singers, this song was written by Motown staff songwriter/producer William "Mickey" Stevenson, (who also doubled as the Motown label's A&R director) and songwriter Ivy Jo Hunter.

An instructional dance number, Billy Gordon, as the group's narrator, invites the listener to learn the jerk, with the words:

"Can You Do The Jerk?
Come on, let's work
Move your shoulders up and down...
your feet don't leave the ground...
Anyone can do it...
Friends, there's nothing to it.
It's for young or old...all it takes is soul...
And I just wanna know
Can You Jerk Like Me".

The Capitols' more successful 1966 Top 10 song, "Cool Jerk", borrows heavily from "Can You Jerk Like Me" in key and tempo, and partially, even lyrics (The Contours' "c'mon, child-ren" vs. The Capitols' "C'mon peo-ple") and, not coincidentally, both songs feature music by Motown's hot studio band, The Funk Brothers, with the Motown musicians moonlighting for the non-Motown group's Karen Records release.

1964 was the last year that the original Contours recorded for Motown. Despite being among the label's earliest artists, The Contours never received the attention or promotion that the other Motown acts received because Motown head Berry Gordy felt that the group didn't have enough "crossover potential". With the sole exception of Contours lead vocalist Billy Gordon (who sang lead on the group's biggest hit, the million-selling "Do You Love Me"), and guitarist Huey Davis, all of the rest of the members – Joe Billingslea, Billy Hoggs, Hubert Johnson, and Sylvester Potts – quit the group...and the label. Keeping Gordon and Davis, Gordy then built a new Contours group around them, with new members including Jerry Green, Council Gay, and Alvin English. Later members included the returning Sylvester Potts, and Dennis Edwards. With the return of Sylvester Potts, lead singer Gordon then departed the group for good, to be replaced by Joseph Stubbs (brother of The Four Tops' lead singer Levi Stubbs). Joe Stubbs would also leave shortly after; the reconstituted group with Dennis Edwards as lead continued to record with Motown through 1967.

== Credits: The Contours ==
- Lead vocals by Billy Gordon
- Backing vocals by Jerry Green, Council Gay, and Alvin English
- Guitar by Huey Davis
- Other instrumentation by The Funk Brothers

== Chart performance ==
Chart (1964–65)	Peak position
US Billboard Hot 100	47
US Top 50 in R&B Locations (Cash Box)	15

== Bibliography ==
- Nowhere To Run: The Story of Soul Music by Gerri Hirshey, p. 122–128, Southbank Publishing (2006) ISBN 978-1904915102
