= Whole Lotta Woman (The Contours song) =

Single by The Contours

from the album Do You Love Me (Now That I Can Dance)
- B-side: "Come on and Be Mine"
- Released: February 1961 (1st Ver.); May, 1961 (2nd Ver.)
- Recorded: Hitsville USA (Studio A); 1961
- Genre: Soul
- Length: 2:41
- Label: Motown
- Songwriter(s): Billy Hoggs, Billy Gordon, Smokey Robinson
- Producer(s): Berry Gordy, Jr.

The Contours singles chronology
"Whole Lotta Woman" (1961)	"The Stretch" (1961)

"Whole Lotta Woman" is a 1961 single recorded by the Contours for the Motown Records label. Written by Smokey Robinson (of The Miracles), and Contours group members Billy Hoggs and Billy Gordon (the group's lead singers), and produced by Motown CEO Berry Gordy, Jr., it was the group's debut single for Motown.

Two versions of this song were released, with very notable changes. The first version was raw, more soulful, and had minimal orchestration. The second version was more conventional, and made for a national release. There was also a personnel change in between the two versions: The first one was the only recording of the group (other than the B-side "Come On And Be Mine") that feature the vocals of original member Leroy Fair, who was replaced by Sylvester Potts by the time they recorded the second version.

Both versions of the single received a lot of airplay on local Detroit stations, but it did not chart nationally. However, two singles later The Contours would finally score a hit with 1962's "Do You Love Me".

== Credits: The Contours ==
- Lead vocal by Billy Hoggs (verses) and Billy Gordon (choruses)
- Background vocals by Hubert Johnson, Joe Billingslea (both versions), Leroy Fair (1st version only), and Sylvester Potts (2nd version only)
- Guitar by Huey Davis
- Other instrumentation by The Funk Brothers

== References and external links ==
- Whole Lotta Woman - by The Contours (song review)
- Whole Lotta Woman-Video and commentary on YouTube
