= First I Look at the Purse =

Single by the Contours
- B-side: "Searching for a Girl"
- Released: 1965
- Recorded: 1965
- Studio: Hitsville USA (Studio A)
- Genre: Soul
- Length: 2:41
- Label: Gordy
- Songwriters: Smokey Robinson, Bobby Rogers
- Producer: Smokey Robinson

The Contours singles chronology
"Can You Jerk Like Me/That Day When She Needed Me" (1964)	"First I Look at the Purse" (1965)	"Just a Little Misunderstanding" (1966)

"First I Look at the Purse" (G7044) is a 1965 song recorded by R&B group the Contours on Motown Records' Gordy label. It was written by Miracles members Smokey Robinson and Bobby Rogers, the authors of the Temptations' first hit single, "The Way You Do the Things You Do".

== Background ==
"First I Look at the Purse" was the last Contours hit featuring original lead Billy Gordon. It also features the renewed line-up of Contours, as several original members had left back in 1964. Shortly after its release, Gordon departed the group, and Motown, due to personal problems. He was replaced with Joe Stubbs, brother of the lead singer of fellow Motown group the Four Tops, Levi Stubbs.

In the early 2000s, the Contours performed the song on the PBS special Motown: The Early Years. It has also appeared in several Contours' Motown "Greatest Hits" CD compilations.

== Chart performance ==
"First I Look at the Purse" reached #57 on the Billboard Hot 100, and the Top 20 on Billboard's Hot Rhythm & Blues Singles chart, peaking at #12.

== Credits ==
- Lead vocal by Billy Gordon
- Backing vocals by Sylvester Potts, Council Gay, and Jerry Green
- Spoken intro by Bobby Rogers (of the Miracles)
- Guitar by Huey Davis
- Other instrumentation by the Funk Brothers

== Cover versions ==
This song is the opening track on The J. Geils Band's 1972 album Live Full House, and a side two track on their 1970 album The J. Geils Band.

In 1993, Rod Stewart covered the song as a Slow Blues, on his compilation Lead Vocalist (album).
