= Just a Little Misunderstanding =

Single by The Contours
- B-side: "Determination"
- Released: April 13, 1966
- Recorded: Hitsville USA (Studio A); 1966
- Genre: Soul
- Length: 2:29
- Label: Gordy; G7052
- Songwriters: Stevie Wonder; Clarence Paul; Morris Broadnax
- Producers: Clarence Paul; William "Mickey" Stevenson

The Contours singles chronology
"First I Look at the Purse" (1965)	"Just a Little Misunderstanding" (1966)	"It's So Hard Being a Loser" / "Your Love Grows More Precious Everyday" (1967)

"Just a Little Misunderstanding" (G7052) is a 1966 song by Motown Records R&B group The Contours on the company's Gordy subsidiary label. It was composed by Stevie Wonder, along with Motown staff songwriters Clarence Paul and Morris Broadnax. The song did not appear on any original Contours studio album. Paul and Motown A&R Director William "Mickey" Stevenson were the song's producers, and Wonder plays drums on the recording.

== Description ==
This song was not a big chart success, only reaching # 85 on the Billboard Hot 100. It did much better on the Billboard R&B chart, however, reaching the Top 20, peaking at #18. It was also a Top 40 hit in the UK in 1970, reaching # 31 on the UK Chart. The first hit by the group that did not feature original lead singer Billy Gordon, "Just a Little Misunderstanding" featured lead vocals by his replacement, Joseph Stubbs, (brother of The Four Tops' lead singer, Levi Stubbs), who previously sang for the Detroit-based R&B group The Falcons.

In this hard-driving, uptempo song, Stubbs, as the song's narrator, portrays a man trying to apologize to his wife for his bad behavior, only to find out that she is about to leave him.

This was Stubbs' only lead on a Contours single. Shortly after this song was recorded, Stubbs left the Contours and Motown. Stubbs' lead spot in the Contours was taken by future Temptation Dennis Edwards on the group's next single release,"It's So Hard Being a Loser" b/w "Your Love Grows More Precious Everyday".Stubbs went on to Holland-Dozier-Holland's Hot Wax label, and became lead singer of the group 100 Proof (Aged in Soul).

== Albums and covers ==
Just a Little Misunderstanding has appeared on several Contours' "Greatest Hits" CD compilations on the Motown label,

== Personnel ==
- Lead vocals by Joseph Stubbs
- Backing vocals by Sylvester Potts, Council Gay, Jerry Green, and The Andantes (Jackie Hicks, Marlene Barrow, and Louvain Demps)
- Guitar by Huey Davis
- Drums by Stevie Wonder
- Other instruments by The Funk Brothers
