= Jay Johnson (singer) =

- Origin: Detroit, Michigan, United States
- Genres: R&B, soul, doo-wop
- Occupation(s): Singer, songwriter
- Instrument(s): Vocals, bass-baritone
- Years active: 1955–present
- Labels: Fortune Records, Super Sports, Medieval Records

James "Jay" Johnson established himself as one of the top bass-baritone singers in the Detroit doo-wop and soul music scene during the pre-Motown years. He was a member of the Detroit group Nolan Strong & The Diablos and can be heard on the group's Fortune Records recordings from late 1956 on.

While at Fortune Records, Johnson also recorded with Andre Williams' 'New Group.' He can also be heard as the dominant bass voice on Nathaniel Mayer's hit "Village Of Love".

Johnson would later form The Velvet Angels and The Four Sonics. He is currently performing with a new Diablos group he organized, Nolan Strong's Diablos – Johnson is the only original member.

== Nolan Strong and the Diablos, Fortune Records ==
Johnson, 15 years old at the time, joined the Nolan Strong & the Diablos in 1956. Johnson was introduced to Nolan Strong through fellow Fortune Records artist Andre Williams. Johnson performed and recorded in Andre Williams' New Group. Johnson is heard on William's songs: "Bacon Fat", "Just Because Of A Kiss", "Mean Jean", and "Bobby Jean". Along with Johnson, Andre Williams’ "New Group" also consisted of, Gino Parks, Bobby Calhoun, and Steve Gaston.

Johnson's first session with the Diablos was on "Can't We Talk It Over" and "Mambo of Love", recorded in late 1956 and released in 1957. By the time the first Nolan Strong & the Diablos "Fortune Of Hits" LP was released, Johnson had replaced George Scott as bass, however, the picture on the album cover did not reflect the change, instead showing the older line-up, without Johnson.

== The Velvet Angels ==
By the 1960s when the Diablos were slowly disbanding. Johnson moved to New Jersey, looking to form a new group, The Velvet Angels, in the New York City area. The Velvet Angels consisted of Johnson, former Diablos member Willie Hunter, Bobby Calhoun and Cy Iverson. One session featured Nolan Strong.

The Velvet Angels made a name for themselves in and around Jersey City, performing lively acts at local clubs, where the group's a cappella singing – which mixed gospel, doo-wop, and early soul, began to draw crowds.

By 1964, due to personnel issues, the members decided to end the Velvet Angels. The group, who recorded at least 19 songs, became somewhat of a legend in the doo-wop community after some of their A Capella practice tapes were sold and later issued on the Medieval record label. When the members left New Jersey, Calhoun headed south and by his account did some work with Stax Records. Iverson, Hunter and Johnson all returned to Detroit.

== Four Sonics ==
After his return to Detroit, Johnson spent some time singing with a group called the Five Monarchs but never recorded with them. Still hoping to achieve major success in the music field, once again Johnson decided to form his group. And so, in the late 1960s, the Four Sonics were born. At its inception the Four Sonics was made up of Bill Frazier (tenor lead), Steve Gaston (tenor), Eddie Daniels (baritone), and Johnson (bass).

The group recorded for Andrew Harris at his "Super Sonic Sound" Studio, from which the group derived their Four Sonics name. They had two releases in 1968 on Harris' Sport label. The first of these was issued as Sport 110 "You Don't Have to Say You Love Me" (same song sung by Dusty Springfield) backed with "It Takes Two". This release was to be quickly followed by Sport 111's "The Greatest Love" (written by Johnson and Anita Watson) and led by Bill Frazier covered with "Easier Said Than Done", led by Eddie Daniels.

The Four Sonics performed extensively and headlined many shows in the Detroit area. The original Four Sonics grew by adding another "Sonic", Johnny Dixon. But rather than renaming the group the Five Sonics, they chose the more creative name, "Four Sonics + 1". According to Johnson, Johnny Dixon had an enormous singing range, going from baritone to soprano. In 1968, as the Four Sonics + 1, they recorded one single on the Sepia label "Tell Me You're Mine" backed with "Lost Without You". Although Johnson had formed the Four Sonics, there were some internal problems. As a result, there was also another release by the Four Sonics on Triple "B" at a time when Johnson was not singing with the group. The tunes on this release were "Blue Velvet" and "Where Are You" (with Dixon on lead).

Going into the 1970s there were more changes for the group. Dixon, Daniels and Gaston departed, to be replaced by Vernon Williams (Satintones, Royal Holidays & Pyramids) and Sylvester Potts (of The Contours). Later, Bill Frazier left the group and was replaced by a lady, Gloria Sykes. This Four Sonics group issued one record on the JMC label. "There's No Love" and "If It Wasn't for My Baby." Four Sonics records are valuable among Northern Soul vinyl collectors.

== Present day ==
Johnson is performing with a new Diablos group as Nolan Strong's Diablos. The group features all-new vocalists, including Bobby Turk, Art Howard, and Mike Clark. The group is currently booking shows.
