= Do You Love Me (Now That I Can Dance) =

Studio album by The Contours
- Released: October 1962
- Recorded: 1961–1962
- Genres: Soul, doo-wop, rock & roll
- Label: Gordy
- Producer: Berry Gordy, Jr.

The Contours chronology
Do You Love Me (Now That I Can Dance) (1962)	A New Direction (2000)

Professional ratings
Review scores
Source	Rating
Allmusic	3/5 stars

Do You Love Me (Now That I Can Dance) is the only album issued by The Contours during their recording career at Motown Records. Issued on Motown's Gordy subsidiary in October 1962, the album includes the hit title track and the number 21 R&B hit single "Shake Sherry". Also including the early singles "Whole Lotta Woman" and "The Stretch", Do You Love Me is the first LP to be released by Gordy Records.

The title song was performed in the movies Dirty Dancing, Getting Even With Dad, Teen Wolf Too (by Ragtime), and Beethoven's 2nd. It was performed by Bootsy Collins and the Funk Brothers in the movie Standing in the Shadows of Motown. In 2016 it was used in a Pepsi-Cola commercial featuring Janelle Monáe, and in 2020 in a Boston Dynamics commercial featuring dancing robots.

Barni Wright was credited for the cover design.

== Track listing ==
Side A

1. "Do You Love Me" (Berry Gordy, Jr.)
2. "Shake Sherry" (Gordy)
3. "You Better Get in Line" (Gordy)
4. "The Stretch" (Loucye Gordy Wakefield, William "Mickey" Stevenson)
5. "It Must Be Love" (Joe Billingslea, Sylvester Potts)
6. "Whole Lotta Woman" (Smokey Robinson, Billy Gordon, Billy Hoggs)

Side B

1. "Claudia" (Clarence Paul, Ivy Jo Hunter, Stevenson)
2. "So Grateful" (Gordy)
3. "The Old Miner" (Stevenson)
4. "Funny" (Stevenson, Gordon, Potts)
5. "Move Mr. Man" (Gordy, Rebecca Nichols)

== 1988 CD track listing ==
1. "Do You Love Me" 6:37
2. "Just a Little Misunderstanding" 2:43
3. "Shake Sherrie" 2:51
4. "Can You Do It?" 2:19
5. "Don't Let Her Be Your Baby" 2:50
6. "First I Look at the Purse" 3:00
7. "Whole Lotta Woman" 2:37
8. "Can You Jerk Like Me?" 2:30
9. "It's So Hard Being a Loser" 2:39
10. "You Get Ugly" 2:22

The song "Do You Love Me" on the CD/tape (not LP) reissues is not the 1962 hit single version (2:54). It is some kind of extended disco remix (6:37). Also, besides the songs "Shake Sherrie" and "Whole Lotta Woman", the other songs are different from the 1962 LP release and consist of later hits, etc.
