= That Day When She Needed Me =

Single by The Contours
- A-side: "Can You Jerk Like Me"
- Released: 1964
- Recorded: Hitsville USA (Studio A); 1964
- Genre: Soul
- Length: 2:41
- Label: Gordy; G7037
- Songwriter: Smokey Robinson
- Producer: Smokey Robinson

The Contours singles chronology
"Can You Do It" (1964)	"Can You Jerk Like Me" / "That Day When She Needed Me" (1964)	"First I Look at the Purse" (1965)

"That Day When She Needed Me" (also known as "I was a Thousand Miles Away That Day When She Needed Me"), is a 1964 R&B song by the Motown Records group The Contours, on the label's Gordy Records subsidiary imprint. Issued as the "B" side of their hit "Can You Jerk Like Me", this song broke out as a hit on its own, reaching No. 37 on the Cash Box R&B listings that year.(Billboard had temporarily suspended its R&B Chart in 1964.)

Written, composed, and produced by Miracles lead singer Smokey Robinson, this song was different from every other tune the Contours had recorded up to that point. A unique counterpoint to the group's trademark rough, raucous delivery, "That Day" was a soft, quiet, and heart-felt ballad with a unique call and response delivery,(structured like a "question and answer session"). Though the song wasn't on the "A" side, it still became a hit, making it The Contours' only charting flip-side hit.

In the song, Billy Gordon, the lead singer, acts as the narrator, while the rest of the group (Billy Hoggs, Sylvester Potts, Joe Billingslea, Hubert Johnson, and guitarist Huey Davis) ask him questions. The song serves as a cautionary tale on how he lost the love of his life.

This song has inspired a cover version by the Los Angeles–based R&B group The Performers and the Los Angeles–based group Sly Slick and Wicked, and has been issued on several Contours and Motown "greatest hits" collections including The Complete Motown Singles: Volume 4 and the now out-of-print Motown CD collection, The Very Best of the Contours. However, the song was originally slated to appear on the 1964 unreleased second Contours album for Motown entitled "The Contours: Can You Dance" (Gordy 910). This album has since been made available as a digital download on certain internet sites.

(Note: Unlike the "A" side, "Can You Jerk Like Me", which featured the new, reconstituted Contours, THIS song featured the ORIGINAL Contours (Billy Hoggs, Joe Billingslea, Hubert Johnson, Sylvester Potts, and Huey Davis) along with Billy Gordon, in their final chart appearance, recorded just prior to their departure).

== Credits ==
- Lead vocals by Billy Gordon
- Background vocals by Billy Hoggs, Joe Billingslea, Sylvester Potts, and Hubert Johnson
- Guitar by Huey Davis
- Other instrumentation by The Funk Brothers

== See also ==
- The Contours
- Smokey Robinson
