= Shake Sherry =

Single by The Contours

from the album Do You Love Me (Now That I Can Dance)
- Released: November 1962
- Recorded: Hitsville USA (Studio A); 1962
- Genre: Motown
- Length: 2:39
- Label: Gordy; G 7012
- Songwriter(s): Berry Gordy, Jr.
- Producer(s): Berry Gordy, Jr.

The Contours singles chronology
"Do You Love Me" (1962)	"Shake Sherry" (1962)	"Don't Let Her Be Your Baby" (1963)

"Shake Sherry" (sometimes spelled on record as "Shake Sherrie") was a 1962 R&B song by Motown Records group The Contours, issued on its Gordy subsidiary label (Gordy 7012). It was the follow-up to the group's million-selling top-5 hit single "Do You Love Me", and was taken from their album of the same name.

Not as successful as its predecessor, "Shake Sherry" missed the Billboard Pop Top 40, peaking at number 43, and charted at number 21 on its R&B Chart. It was written by Motown Records' founder and first President Berry Gordy, who had written the group's previous hit, and had been quite successful as a songwriter and producer before founding Motown Records, having written hit singles for Jackie Wilson, Etta James, Marv Johnson, and others.

Unlike "Do You Love Me", which had been (allegedly) originally intended for The Temptations, Shake Sherry was written specifically for The Contours, one of several songs Gordy composed for the group.

This song's relative chart failure, compared to "Do You Love Me", meant that The Contours' run as a headline act in the Motortown Revue touring shows of the early 1960s was relatively short-lived: although their live performances made them a crowd favorite, history has branded them as "one hit wonders". Despite Motown's relative lack of promotion, The Contours charted several times for the label between 1962 and 1967.

== Credits: The Contours ==
- Billy Gordon – lead
- Billy Hoggs – 2nd lead
- Sylvester Potts – tenor/baritone
- Hubert Johnson – bass
- Joe Billingslea – baritone
- Huey Davis – guitar

Other instruments: The Funk Brothers
