= Whole Lotta Woman =

Whole Lotta Woman may refer to:

- "Whole Lotta Woman" (Marvin Rainwater song), 1958
- "Whole Lotta Woman" (The Contours song), 1961
- "Whole Lotta Woman" (Kelly Clarkson song), 2017
- "Whole Lotta Rosie", a song by AC/DC, 1977; sometimes mis-remembered as "Whole Lotta Woman", due to its chorus of "You're a whole lotta woman / A whole lotta woman / Whole lotta Rosie"
