= Jerk (dance) =

Popular American fad dance in the 1960s

The jerk is a dance in which performers make sudden movements by jerking their body back and forth. It rose to popularity in the 1960s, where it became a fad dance.

== Description ==
The jerk is similar to the monkey. The arms move and hands move as if conducting. The wrists cross in front of the chest and then sweep out in time, or at half time, with the music. The hands are up at face level. On count 1, the outward sweep, the hands are quickly pushed out, giving the jerky motion. For a little more style, the fingers may be snapped on the two outward movements—the first and third counts of the hand motion.

== Songs featuring or suggesting the dance ==
- Released as a single in 1964 on the Money record label, "The Jerk" was a hit for the Los Angeles band the Larks.
- In the same year, the Miracles wrote and recorded "Come on Do the Jerk".
- Another Motown group, the Contours, released "Can You Jerk Like Me" in 1964.
- Dobie Gray released "Monkey Jerk" as the B-side to his 1965 single "My Baby".
- Jackie Ross reworked a previous track "Everything But Love" into "Jerk and Twine", a 1965 single on Chess Records combining two fad dances.
- James Brown referenced the dance in his 1965 hit single, "Papa's Got A Brand New Bag"
- The Capitols performed a 1966 hit song called "Cool Jerk", written to capitalize on the dance's popularity. The song has been covered by several bands, including the Go-Go's.
- Rocket from the Crypt recorded the song "When in Rome, Do the Jerk" in 1998 as a homage to the dance.
- Bobby Fuller referenced this dance in his song, "Jenny Lee (Do the Jerk With Me)".
- George Harrison made a reference in his song, "Dark Horse" from 1974.
- Janet Jackson made reference to jerking in her 2004 single "All Nite (Don't Stop)".

== References in popular culture ==
Hip hop performers the Sugarhill Gang mention that Tonto performs the dance in their 1981 hit song "Apache". (Note: Kemosabe got down, took off his mask And kicked off his shoes and did the Monster Mash. Tonto came along, saw what was happening His head began to pop and his foot starts to patting And go slam! dunk! do the Jerk And with the mic is how my smoke signals work)
