= Mary Elizabeth Vroman =

American writer and schoolteacher (c.1924–1967)

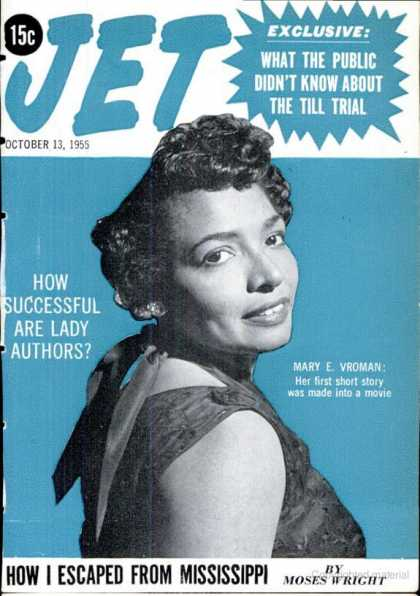
- Born: c. 1924; Buffalo, New York
- Died: April 29, 1967; New York, New York
- Occupation: Writer, teacher
- Education: BA
- Alma mater: Alabama State University
- Notable works: "See How They Run", 1951

Mary Elizabeth Vroman (c. 1924 – April 29, 1967) was an American author of several books and short stories, including "See How They Run", a short story published in 1951.

== Background ==
Vroman was born circa 1924 in Buffalo, New York, and was raised in the British West Indies. She attended Alabama State Teachers College and graduated in 1949. She was a schoolteacher in Alabama and wrote her first short story, "See How They Run", based on her experiences in the classroom. It was published in Ladies' Home Journal in June 1951. She was presented the 1952 Christopher Award for the work and it was made into a 1953 film entitled Bright Road. Her work on the film earned her admittance to the Screen Writers Guild. She was their first African-American woman member.

An author, her stories and screenplays depict the challenges of poverty and disadvantage. She was married to Dr. Oliver M. Harper at the time of her death after surgery on April 29, 1967, in New York.

== Works ==
- See How They Run
- And Have Not Charity (1951)
- Bright Road
- Esther (1963)
- Shaped to Its Purpose: Delta Sigma Theta, The First Fifty Years
- Harlem Summer
