= Singin' Sammy Ward =

American singer (1929–1996)

James T. Woodley (December 21, 1929 – November 20, 1996), who performed as Singin' Sammy Ward, was an American rhythm and blues singer who recorded for Motown Records and had a R&B chart hit with "Who's The Fool", written by Smokey Robinson and produced by Berry Gordy, Jr., in 1961.

He grew up in the Ensley area of Birmingham, Alabama, before moving to Detroit, Michigan, where he was established as a club singer by the late 1950s. He was named "Singin' Sammy Ward" by Berry Gordy's wife Raynoma, "Miss Ray", and first recorded for Motown in 1960, on a duet with Sherri Taylor, "Lover" / "That's Why I Love You So Much". He then moved to the Tamla label as a solo singer, and recorded "That Child Is Really Wild", co-written by Gordy and Robinson. The original B-side, "What Makes You Love Him", was changed to another song, Robinson's "Who's The Fool", which became Ward's only chart success, reaching no. 23 on the Billboard R&B chart in August 1961. The record was only the fourth successful chart hit for Motown. According to record producer Ian Levine, Robinson also wrote "You Really Got a Hold on Me" for Ward, but Gordy insisted that Robinson record it himself, with The Miracles. A bluesy singer who drew comparisons with Bobby Bland, Ward released several more singles on Tamla, including "Big Joe Moe" written by William "Mickey" Stevenson and Brian Holland, and "Someday Pretty Baby" featuring Stevie Wonder on harmonica, both in 1962, and then one on the subsidiary Soul label. However, the records were commercial failures, and Ward left Motown, disillusioned by his lack of success compared with others on the label, by the mid-1960s.

Credited as Sam Ward, he recorded Richard "Popcorn" Wylie's "Stone Broke" and "Sister Lee" for the Groove City label in 1968. He then gave up the music business until rediscovered by British Northern soul fans, and by record producer Ian Levine, who recorded several sessions with him, starting in 1989, for his Motorcity label. Ward re-recorded many of his 1960s recordings at that time. Levine stated of Ward that: "He was almost impossible to record, as he couldn't stick to any melody at all, and merely improvised in a bluesy voice..." However, Levine released several dance singles by Ward in the early 1990s. Ward also appeared at weekend soul festivals in Britain at the same time.

He died in 1996 in Mount Clemens, Michigan.
