= Do You Love Me =

1962 single by the Contours

Single by the Contours

from the album Do You Love Me (Now That I Can Dance)
- B-side: "Move, Mr. Man"
- Released: 1962
- Recorded: 1962
- Studio: Hitsville USA (Studio A), Detroit, Michigan
- Genre: Rhythm and blues; rock and roll
- Length: 2:54
- Label: Gordy
- Songwriter: Berry Gordy Jr.
- Producer: Berry Gordy Jr.

The Contours singles chronology
| "The Stretch" (1961) | "Do You Love Me" (1962) | "Shake Sherry" (1962) |

"Do You Love Me" is a rhythm and blues song recorded by the Contours in 1962. Written and produced by Motown Records owner Berry Gordy Jr., it appeared twice on the Billboard Hot 100 chart, reaching number three in 1962 and number 11 in 1988.

As with many American R&B songs of the 1960s, "Do You Love Me" was recorded by several British Invasion groups. A 1963 version by Brian Poole and the Tremeloes reached number one on the UK Singles Chart. It also became a hit for the Dave Clark Five, reaching number 11 on the Billboard Hot 100 in 1964.

== Background and recording ==
Berry Gordy wrote "Do You Love Me" and earmarked it for the Temptations, who had no top-40 hits to their name yet. However, when Gordy was looking for the group to record it, he could not find them as they had gone to church to see gospel groups the Dixie Hummingbirds, the Harmonizing Four and the Swan Silvertones. Instead, the Contours, who had turned up to the studio to record their song "It Must Be Love", were asked by Gordy to try singing "Do You Love Me". After several attempts, they sang it exactly how Gordy wanted, and it was then recorded the following day. Contours singer Joe Billingslea stated in an interview in 2009 that "The Temptations could never have sung that song because it wasn't suited to them but Berry had motivated us to sing it the way he wanted it".

The Contours, who were in danger of being dropped from the label after their first two singles, "Whole Lotta' Woman" and "The Stretch", failed to chart, immediately accepted. Instrumental backing was provided by Joe Hunter on piano, James Jamerson on bass, and Benny Benjamin on drums (later known as the Funk Brothers).

Gordy said that "getting the concept for the song was easy. I remembered the days when I could never get the girls I liked because I couldn't dance". As such, the song references the 1960s dance moves the Mashed Potato and the Twist.

== Release and reception ==
"Do You Love Me" became a successful dance record, built around lead singer Billy Gordon's screaming vocals. Selling over a million copies, "Do You Love Me" peaked at number three on the Billboard Hot 100 for three weeks starting on October 20, 1962, and reached the top position on the Billboard R&B Singles chart. The song was included on the 1962 album Do You Love Me (Now That I Can Dance).

In 1987, the Contours' recording was included in the film Dirty Dancing. Reissued as a single from the More Dirty Dancing soundtrack album, "Do You Love Me" became a hit for the second time, peaking at #11 on the Billboard Hot 100 in August 1988. A second single, with a newly remixed version by Brian Tankersley and Iris Gordy, was also released in 1988. The Contours, by then composed of Joe Billingslea and three new members, joined Ronnie Spector and Bill Medley, among others, on a "Dirty Dancing Tour" resulting from the success of the film.

The Contours' recording was also included in the Tiny Toon Adventures episode "Toon TV" (aired in 1992) in which Buster Bunny lip syncs the song whilst attempting to show Babs Bunny his new dance moves.

In 2002, artist Bootsy Collins performed the song live, backed by the Funk Brothers, in the documentary Standing in the Shadows of Motown, shot in Detroit, Michigan.

According to music journalist Dave Marsh, "Do You Love Me" is representative of Gordy's talent as a musician, producer, arranger, and songwriter: "The result is not only classic rock and roll but a tribute to his stature as the greatest backstage talent in rock history." Gordy viewed the song as an example of the musical overlap between rhythm and blues, pop, and rock and roll, telling Billboard in 1963, "It was recorded r. & b. but by the time it reached the half-million mark, it was considered pop. And if we hadn't recorded it with a Negro artist, it would have been considered rock and roll."

== Personnel ==
- Billy Gordon – lead vocals
- Billy Hoggs – 2nd lead vocals
- Joe Billingslea – baritone vocals
- Sylvester Potts – tenor/baritone vocals
- Hubert Johnson – bass vocals
- Huey Davis – guitar
- The Funk Brothers – other instrumentation

== Charts ==
| Chart (1962–1963) | Peak position |
|---|---|
| Australia (Kent Music Report) | 63 |
| Belgium (Ultratop 50 Flanders) | 13 |
| Belgium (Ultratop 50 Wallonia) | 20 |
| Canada (CFUN) | 3 |
| Canada (CHUM) | 2 |
| Netherlands (Single Top 100) | 10 |
| New Zealand (Lever Hit Parade) | 6 |
| US Billboard Hot 100 | 3 |
| US Hot R&B/Hip-Hop Songs (Billboard | 1 |
| US Cash Box Top 100 | 2 |
| US Cash Box Top 50 in R&B Locations | 1 |

| Chart (1988) | Peak position |
|---|---|
| Belgium (Ultratop 50 Flanders) | 13 |
| Canada Top Singles (RPM) | 16 |
| Canada Adult Contemporary (RPM) | 30 |
| Netherlands (Dutch Top 40) | 10 |
| Netherlands (Single Top 100) | 8 |
| UK Singles (Official Charts) | 76 |
| US Billboard Hot 100 | 11 |
| US Adult Contemporary (Billboard) | 24 |
| US Cash Box Top 100 | 13 |

== Certifications ==
| Region | Certification | Certified units/sales |
|---|---|---|
| New Zealand (RMNZ) | Gold | 15,000^{‡} |
| United Kingdom (BPI) | Platinum | 600,000^{‡} |
^{‡} Sales+streaming figures based on certification alone.

== Brian Poole and the Tremeloes version ==
"Do You Love Me"

Single by Brian Poole and the Tremeloes
- B-side: "Why Can't You Love Me"
- Released: 31 August 1963
- Recorded: 14 August 1963
- Studio: Decca Studios, London
- Genre: Beat, garage rock
- Length: 2:26
- Label: Decca
- Songwriter: Berry Gordy Jr.
- Producer: Mike Smith

Brian Poole and the Tremeloes singles chronology
| "Twist and Shout" (1963) | "Do You Love Me" (1963) | "I Can Dance" (1963) |

=== Background and release ===
Brian Poole and the Tremeloes first heard "Do You Love Me" on the Contours' album Do You Love Me (Now That I Can Dance). Other bands were also playing the Contours' songs and the group decided that "Do You Love Me" should be the follow-up single to their top-five hit version of "Twist and Shout". It was recorded in the same way as "Twist and Shout", with the group miking up a PA system in the studio in order to imitate their live sound.

Brian Poole and the Tremeloes' version of "Do You Love Me" is noticeably different to the Contours' version, with writer and lecturer Andrew Flory describing it as "a refined version of a Motown rock song; instead of a raucous sound offered by the Contours, through pitch and rhythm normalization, instrumentation, and vocal timbre differences, the Tremeloes created a stereotypical Merseybeat interpretation".

"Do You Love Me" was released as a single in late August 1963, with the B-side, "Why Can't You Love Me", written by Tremeloes guitarist Alan Blakley. The single had been intended for release in late September, but was rush-released on 31 August to capitalise on the success of "Twist and Shout" and to combat a version by fellow beat group the Dave Clark Five which was set for release on 6 September. "Do You Love Me" topped the four main music paper charts in the UK and became the group's only number one before the departure of Brian Poole in 1966, after which they achieved a further number one with "Silence Is Golden" in 1967. "Do You Love Me" sold over 250,000 copies and was awarded a silver disc by Disc.

Reviewing for New Musical Express, Keith Fordyce described "Do You Love Me" as "raucous and a strain on the vocal chords, but it's bursting with excitement". Don Nicholl for Disc described it as "a brash, noisy group working to produce a beat that is going to be just what the dancer ordered".

=== Personnel ===
- Brian Poole – lead vocals
- Rick Westwood – lead guitar
- Alan Blakley – rhythm guitar
- Alan Howard – bass guitar
- Dave Munden – drums

=== Charts ===
| Chart (1963) | Peak position |
|---|---|
| Australia (Kent Music Report) | 19 |
| Australia (Music Maker, Sydney) | 1 |
| Denmark (Danmarks Radio) | 5 |
| Finland (Suomen virallinen lista) | 12 |
| Ireland (IRMA) | 1 |
| Norway (VG-lista) | 5 |
| Sweden (Tio i Topp) | 5 |
| UK Disc Top 30 | 1 |
| UK Melody Maker Top 50 | 1 |
| UK New Musical Express Top 30 | 1 |
| UK Record Retailer Top 50 | 1 |

== The Dave Clark Five version ==
"Do You Love Me"

Single by the Dave Clark Five
- B-side: "Doo-Dah" (UK) "Chiquita" (US)
- Released: 6 September 1963
- Recorded: 1963
- Studio: Lansdowne Studios, London
- Genre: Beat
- Length: 2:44
- Label: Columbia
- Songwriter: Berry Gordy Jr.
- Producers: Adrian Kerridge; Dave Clark

The Dave Clark Five UK singles chronology
| "The Mulberry Bush" (1963) | "Do You Love Me" (1963) | "Glad All Over" (1963) |

The Dave Clark Five US singles chronology
| "Bits and Pieces" (1964) | "Do You Love Me" (1964) | "Can't You See That She's Mine" (1964) |

Audio
- "Do You Love Me" on YouTube

=== Background and release ===
Following the rush release of Brian Poole and the Tremeloes' version, the Dave Clark Five released their version of "Do You Love Me" as a single. It was the band's fifth single and they had yet to have any charting success. "Do You Love Me" would become their first charting single, though it only entered the charts in late September and/or early October 1963, and did not chart very highly in the UK. Whilst it was something of a breakthrough for the band, it was irksome as previously they had not been allowed to release their version of "Twist and Shout" (which they had recorded prior to the Beatles' recording) as a single, which had become a hit for both the Beatles and Brian Poole and the Tremeloes. Following "Do You Love Me", the Dave Clark Five decided to release an original song as a single – "Glad All Over", released in November 1963, would go on to top the charts in the UK and become an international hit.

Following the success of "Glad All Over" and the follow-up "Bits and Pieces" in North America, Epic and Capitol Records decided to issue "Do You Love Me" as a single in the US and Canada, respectively, in April 1964. Whilst the original UK release featured "Doo-Dah" (a cover/rewrite of "Camptown Races") as the B-side, the North American release featured an older UK B-side, "Chiquita". The single performed well, peaking at number 11 on the Billboard Hot 100 and number 8 on the Canadian RPM chart. This helped total global sales of the single pass the one million mark.

New Musical Express' Keith Fordyce described it as "a strong rival version to the Tremeloes, without being quite as good. But it's a near thing". Cash Box described "Do You Love Me" as "a 'pull-out-all-the-stops' pounder already busting loose on the charts".

=== Charts ===
| Chart (1963–64) | Peak position |
|---|---|
| Canada (CHUM) | 5 |
| Canada Top Singles (RPM) | 8 |
| UK Melody Maker Top 50 | 29 |
| UK New Musical Express Top 30 | 24 |
| UK Record Retailer Top 50 | 30 |
| US Billboard Hot 100 | 11 |
| US Cash Box Top 100 | 8 |

== Notable cover versions ==
- In 1964, a cover by the British band The Hollies was included in the album Stay with the Hollies.
- In 1965, a cover by the American garage rock band The Sonics was included on their debut album Here Are the Sonics.
- In 1970, a cover by British rock band Deep Feeling peaked at number 34 on the UK Singles Chart.
- The American punk rock band Johnny Thunders and the Heartbreakers recorded a cover of the song, which appeared on re-releases of their sole studio album L.A.M.F.
- In 1984, a cover by British musician Andy Fraser (who was a former member of Free) peaked at number 84 on the Billboard Hot 100.
- In 1995, a cover by Duke Baysee peaked at number 46 in the UK.
- In 2004, a cover by German pop girl group Preluders peaked at number 50 on the German charts.
