= Bright Road =

1953 film

- Directed by: Gerald Mayer
- Screenplay by: Emmet Lavery
- Based on: "See How They Run"; 1951 short story Ladies' Home Journal by Mary Elizabeth Vroman
- Starring: Dorothy Dandridge; Philip Hepburn; Harry Belafonte; Barbara Ann Sanders
- Cinematography: Alfred Gilks
- Edited by: Joseph Dervin
- Music by: David Rose
- Distributed by: Metro-Goldwyn-Mayer
- Release date: April 17, 1953
- Running time: 69 minutes
- Country: United States
- Language: English
- Budget: $377,000
- Box office: $252,000

Bright Road is a 1953 low-budget film adapted from the Christopher Award-winning short story "See How They Run" by Mary Elizabeth Vroman. Directed by Gerald Mayer and featuring a nearly all-black cast, the film stars Dorothy Dandridge as an idealistic first-year elementary school teacher trying to communicate with a problem student. The film is also notable as the first appearance by Harry Belafonte, who costars as the principal of the school.

== Plot ==
Jane Richards is a new teacher beginning her career at a rural black elementary school in Alabama. One of the students in her fourth-grade class is C.T. Young who, although bright and generally not a troublemaker, is uninterested in school and has become accustomed to spending two years at each grade level. He is one of nine children of a semi-employed laborer. Miss Richards is determined to have an impact on C.T. and break his two-year pattern. The school's principal Mr. Williams has doubts about C.T., but he admires Miss Richards' enthusiasm and endorses her efforts.

Miss Richards' efforts with C.T. begin to pay dividends and his grades improve, but her progress appears to be negated when C.T.'s classmate and closest friend Tanya dies after from viral pneumonia. Devastated, C.T. avoids school for a time, and upon his return, he immediately starts a schoolyard fight and then isolates himself from his teacher and classmates. Frustrated and saddened, Miss Richards must return to assigning C.T. the failing grades that had been his previous pattern.

One day, Miss Richards overhears C.T. helping another student with arithmetic, showing that despite his stubborn refusal to participate in class, he has actually continued to learn. Miss Richards is heartened and changes his most recent failing grade to an A. When a swarm of bees invades the classroom and the other students and Miss Richards panic, C.T. calmly collects the queen bee and carries it outside with the swarm following him.

As the school year ends, Miss Richards' class observes a caterpillar emerging from its cocoon, transformed into a butterfly. Miss Richards notes that it is reborn, "just as you and I will be born again someday, and everyone we've ever known or loved," and that witnessing the butterfly's first flight represents "a wonderful promise of things to come." As he leaves to begin his summer vacation, C.T. offers Miss Richards a final validation of the time that she has invested in him by stopping to tell her that he loves her.

== Cast ==
- Dorothy Dandridge as Jane Richards
- Robert Horton as Dr. Mitchell
- Philip Hepburn as C.T. Young
- Harry Belafonte as Mr. Williams, School Principal
- Barbara Ann Sanders as Tanya
- Maidie Norman as Tanya's Mother
- Rene Beard as Booker T. Jones
- Howard McNeeley as Boyd
- Robert McNeeley as Lloyd
- Patti Marie Ellis as Rachel Smith
- Joy Jackson as Sarahlene Babcock
- Fred Moultrie as Roger
- James Moultrie as George
- Carolyn Ann Jackson as Mary Louise
- Clarence Nash, Marion Darlington as Bird Whistling Solo (voice, uncredited)
- Vivian Dandridge as Miss Nelson

== Production ==
Bright Road was produced at MGM by Sol Baer Fielding.

"See How They Run" was Mary Elizabeth Vroman's first published short story, written while she was a schoolteacher in rural Alabama. First published in Ladies' Home Journal in 1951, it also appeared in Ebony magazine in 1952. When Metro-Goldwyn-Mayer purchased the rights to adapt the story to film, Vroman helped write the screenplay, and as a result, became the first black member of the Screen Writers Guild.

Belafonte and Dandridge were known to audiences for their singing talents, which are showcased in Bright Road. Early in the film, Belafonte sings "Suzanne (Every Night When the Sun Goes Down)", and later, Dandridge briefly sings words from the Alfred Tennyson poem "The Princess: Sweet and Low" to the tune of a lullaby. Belafonte and Dandridge costarred again in the musical film Carmen Jones (1954).

Dandridge had been attracted to the lack of racial conflict in the story. She wrote that she was "profoundly fond of ... a theme which showed that beneath any color skin, people were simply people. I had a feeling that themes like this might do more real good than the more hard-hitting protest pictures. I wanted any black girl in the audience to look at me performing in this film and be able to say to herself, 'Why, this schoolteacher could be me.'"

== Reception ==
Bright Road was not commercially successful and some criticized it for having "dealt too timidly with racial and economic questions."

In a contemporary review, critic Wanda Hale of the New York Daily News called the film "completely out of the ordinary" and "a human interest story, humorous, touching and captivating in its approach." Hale's review concluded: "'Bright Road' is a neat, clean-cut little film, amateurish yet thoroughly enjoyable. Much of the charm lies in the natural character of the children and in the endearing performance of the problem child by Philip Hepburn. Miss Dandridge and Belafonte give the acting a professional quality."

== Box office ==
According to MGM records, the film earned $179,000 in the U.S. and Canada and $73,000 elsewhere, resulting in a loss of $263,000.
