= Hattie Littles =

- Born: February 14, 1937; Shelby, Mississippi, U.S.
- Died: June 15, 2000 (aged 63) Flint, Michigan, U.S.
- Genres: Gospel, blues, soul
- Occupation: Vocalist
- Instrument: Vocals
- Labels: Gordy, Motorcity

Hattie Littles (February 14, 1937 – June 15, 2000) was an American soul singer, best known for her 1963 single, "Your Love Is Wonderful," released on Motown's Gordy label.

== Music career ==
She was born in Shelby, Mississippi, and began her singing career in gospel music shows and competitions. She was discovered by Motown producer Clarence Paul, who recruited her in 1962 after she had won three talent shows at "Lee's Sensation Lounge" in Detroit. She was signed to Motown for four years, resulting in her recording ten singles, but only one – "Your Love Is Wonderful" / "Here You Come", both sides written and produced by Berry Gordy Jr. – was released at the time. She preferred performing blues material, and in 1963 was the opening act on Marvin Gaye's tour.

She was rediscovered by Ian Levine, with the help of former Motown guitarist Dave Hamilton, singing gospel in Detroit in the 1980s. Levine started Motorcity Records, which represented more than one hundred artists who previously recorded with Motown. She then released several singles in the UK, including "Running a Fever" (1989), "You're the First, the Last, My Everything" (1990), and "Waiting for the Day" (1991), and the albums The Right Direction (1991), Borderline (1992), and The Very Best of Hattie Littles (1996), which included re-recordings of some of her earlier tracks. Littles had a full, soulful, gospel-tinged voice with a deep vibrato. Tracks on The Very Best of Hattie Littles feature short monologues or "raps", in the classical and bluesy style of Lou Rawls, James Brown, Bobby Blue Bland, and B. B. King.

She died of a heart attack in Flint, Michigan in June 2000, aged 63.
