= Hubert Johnson (musician) =

American singer and performer

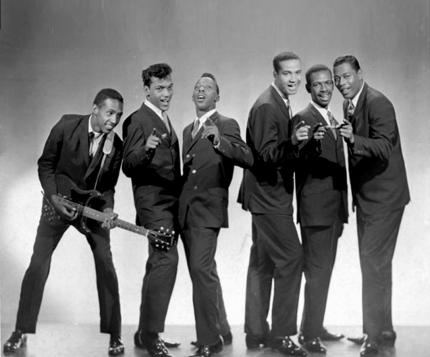
- Hubert Johnson (second from left) as part of The Contours band

Background information
- Born: January 14, 1941; Detroit, Michigan, U.S.
- Died: July 11, 1981 (aged 40) Detroit, Michigan, U.S.
- Genre: R&B
- Occupation: Singer
- Instrument: Vocals
- Years active: 1960–1964
- Label: Motown

Hubert Johnson (January 14, 1941 – July 11, 1981) was an American singer and performer. Johnson is best known for being one of the original members of the Motown R&B vocal group The Contours. Johnson was also the cousin of the late Jackie Wilson.

== Career ==
In 1959, local Detroit musician Joe Billingslea formed a band called "The Blenders" with fellow musicians Billy Gordon and Billy Hoggs. The next year, at the recommendation of Johnson's cousin Jackie Wilson, Johnson joined the trio making it a quartet and, at the recommendation of Billingslea, the group changed their name to "The Contours".

Shortly after the renaming, Berry Gordy signed the group on to his new recording company Motown. The group's first hit came with the release of the single "Do You Love Me" in 1962. The group also achieved success with the songs "Shake Sherry" and "That Day When She Needed Me" in 1963 and 1964.

In 1964, within a matter of two weeks, Johnson along with Billingslea, Gordon, Hoggs and Contours newcomer Sylvester Potts decided to part from Motown.

== Death ==
Johnson began undergoing treatment for mental health in 1980. He was battling from depression amongst other illnesses. On July 11, 1981, Johnson was found dead in his Detroit home. The official cause of death was ruled to be suicide by the ingesting of rat poison and a self-inflicted gunshot wound to the head.
