= The Falcons =

American rhythm and blues vocal group

The Falcons were an American rhythm and blues vocal group, some of whose members went on to be influential in soul music.

== History ==
The Falcons formed in 1955 in Detroit, Michigan on the Mercury Records imprint. After personnel changes in 1956, The Falcons had hits for the Lu Pine Records label with the million-selling "You're So Fine" (1959), and "I Found a Love" (1962). The group recorded under the production wing of Robert West, who gave the group a gospel sound and recorded the singers on his own Flick label. "You're So Fine" was a national hit, charting at No. 17, on United Artists' Unart label after being picked up from Flick.

Joe Stubbs was the lead singer, also on the singles "Just for Your Love" (1959) and "The Teacher" (1960), before Wilson Pickett replaced him in 1960. After 1963, the Fabulous Playboys took over the Falcons name. The later group comprised Carlis 'Sonny' Munro, James Gibson, Johnny Alvin, and Alton Hollowell. This group made the R&B chart in 1966, with "Standing on Guard". In 2005, Munro briefly reformed the group with Frank Garcia, Calvin Stephenson and Charnissa Stephenson.

=== Deaths ===
James Gibson died from prostate cancer in 1984.

Joe Stubbs died on February 5, 1998, at the age of 55.

Bob Manardo died from cancer in Warren, Michigan, on March 6, 2004, at the age of 67.

Wilson Pickett died on January 19, 2006, at the age of 64.

Robert Ward died on December 25, 2008, at the age of 70.

Carlis "Sonny" Monroe died on March 24, 2009, at the age of 71.

Alton "Bart" Hollowell died on August 15, 2010, at the age of 76.

Tom Schettler died on March 9, 2015, at the age of 79.

Mark Rice died on June 27, 2016, at the age of 82.

Arnett Robinson died on June 18, 2018, at the age of 75.

Lance Finney died on February 14, 2019, at the age of 80.

Singer and songwriter Willie Schofield (born December 30, 1939) died from acute kidney failure at his home in Southfield, Michigan, on March 30, 2021, at the age of 81.

Francisco "Frank" Garcia II is deceased.

== Members ==
Some members were replaced over time:

- Eddie Floyd (1955–1962; 1963)
- Bob Manardo (1955–1956; died 2004)
- Arnett Robinson (1955–1956; died 2018)
- Tom Schettler (1955–1956; died 2015)
- Willie Schofield (1955–1962; 1962–1963; died 2021)
- Joe Stubbs (1956–1960; 1963; died 1998)
- Lance Finney (1956–1963; died 2019)
- Robert Ward (c. 1960; died 2008)
- Mack Rice (1956–1963; died 2016)
- Wilson Pickett (1960–1963; died 2006)
- Ben Knight (1962)
- Gene "Earl" Martin (1962–1963)
- Carlis "Sonny" Monroe (1963–1970; 1982–2008; died 2009)
- James Gibson (1963–1970; died 1984)
- Johnny Alvin (1963–1970)
- Alton "Bart" Hollowell (1963–1970; died 2010)
- Chester Flemings (1959)
- Francisco "Frank" Garcia II (2005–2008; died)
- Calvin "Dhaak" Stephenson (2005–2008)
- Charnissa Stephenson (2006–2008)
- Joseph Jackson (1929 - 2018)

== Discography ==
=== Singles ===
Year	Single	Peak chart positions	
Year	Single	US Pop	US R&B
1959	"You're So Fine"	17	2
1959	"You're Mine"	107	―
1959	"Just for Your Love"	―	26
1960	"The Teacher"	―	18
1962	"I Found a Love"	75	6
1966	"Standing on Guard"	107	29
"—" denotes releases that did not chart.
