= Gino Parks =

- Also known as: Geno Parks
- Born: Gene Purifoy; June 26, 1933 (age 92); Fairfield, Alabama, U.S.
- Genres: R&B, gospel
- Occupation: Singer
- Instrument: Vocals
- Years active: 1956–1968, since 2000s
- Labels: Fortune, Miracle, Tamla, Golden World, Crazy Horse

Gino or Geno Parks (born Gene Purifoy, June 26, 1933) is an American R&B singer who recorded for several labels, including Tamla, in the 1950s and 1960s.

== Biography ==
He was born in Fairfield, Alabama, and in his teens sang with several gospel groups including the Harmony Four, the Five Spirituals, and the Evangelistic Gospel Choir. He attended Miles College in Birmingham, before moving to Detroit in late 1954.

He soon met singer and songwriter Andre Williams, joining Williams in his group the Five Dollars, and then Williams' New Group, who had a No. 9 R&B hit single in 1956 with "Bacon Fat". He and Williams then performed as a duo, and recorded for Fortune Records. In 1960, Parks signed for Berry Gordy's Motown Records, and was first credited on "Blibberin' Blabberin' Blues", an answer record to the Coasters' "Yakety Yak", in 1961. This was followed by "That's No Lie", released on the Tamla label, and then "For This I Thank You"/"Fire" in 1962. He then moved to Golden World Records, also in Detroit, releasing "Talkin' About My Baby"/"My Sophisticated Lady" in 1966. The following year he recorded "Nerves of Steel", produced by Raynoma and Eddie Singleton for the Crazy Horse label, and also recorded with Frances Nero as a duo.

Parks left the music business in 1968, and worked for the Atlanta Life Insurance Company, initially in Detroit and later in Atlanta, Georgia. In the meantime, his records became popular among the UK's Northern soul followers. After his retirement, Parks returned to occasional performance. He appeared at the 24th Blues Estafette festival in the Netherlands in 2003, and at the Ponderosa Stomp in New Orleans in 2013.
