= Liz Lands =

American singer

Elizabeth Lands (February 11, 1939 – January 11, 2013) was an American soul singer. Her purported five octave vocal range started her Motown career before Berry Gordy tried to make a name for her in the R&B/Pop market on Gordy Records.

== Life and career ==
Lands was born Elizabeth Lands in the Georgia Sea Islands on February 11, 1939. She grew up in New York City before moving to Detroit and becoming involved in the Southern Christian Leadership Conference. While performing with Harry Belafonte at a benefit show she was scouted by Berry Gordy. He signed her to his gospel label Divinity, but soon switched her to his R&B Gordy label where she released her first single in 1963.

In December 1963, a month after the assassination of President John F. Kennedy, Lands released a vocal tribute to Kennedy that was distributed to 2,000 delegates at the 1964 Democratic National Convention in Atlantic City. Her song "May What He Lived for Live," was included in the memorial to Kennedy at the convention through the efforts of Joe Lieberman, then an administrative assistant to John Moran Bailey, chairman of the Democratic National Committee. Lands performed the song at the 1968 funeral of the Rev. Martin Luther King Jr.

Lands left Motown in 1965, and recorded two singles for T & L Records, a label she formed with her husband R&B singer Tommy Brown. In 1967, she released a single on the Chicago-based One-derful Records. Lands and the Voices of Salvation are featured on the side-B single of Martin Luther King Jr.'s famous I Have a Dream speech, released on Gordy Records (G-7023), in 1968. In the late 1980s/early 1990s, Lands re-emerged and Ian Levine recorded her for his Motorcity label.

Lands died in January 2013.

== Discography ==
- 1959: "Untamed!" (album) (Mercury MG 20435/SR-60108)
- 1963: "May What He Lived For Live" / "He's Got The Whole World In His Hands" (Gordy 7026)
- 1964: "Midnight Johnny" / "Keep Me" (Gordy 7030)
- 1965: "Echo In The Background (Of My Broken Heart)" / "Qualify For My Love" (T & L 1001)
- 1965: "Let It Be Me" / "Cotton Fields" (T & L 1002)
- 1967: "One Man's Poison" / "Don't Shut Me Out" (One-derful 4847)
- 1968: Rev. Martin Luther King Jr. / Liz Lands And The Voices Of Salvation – "I Have A Dream" / "We Shall Overcome" (Gordy 7023)
- 1990: "Starting All Over Again" (12" single) - (Motor City MOTC 28)
