= Barbara Randolph =

American singer and actress

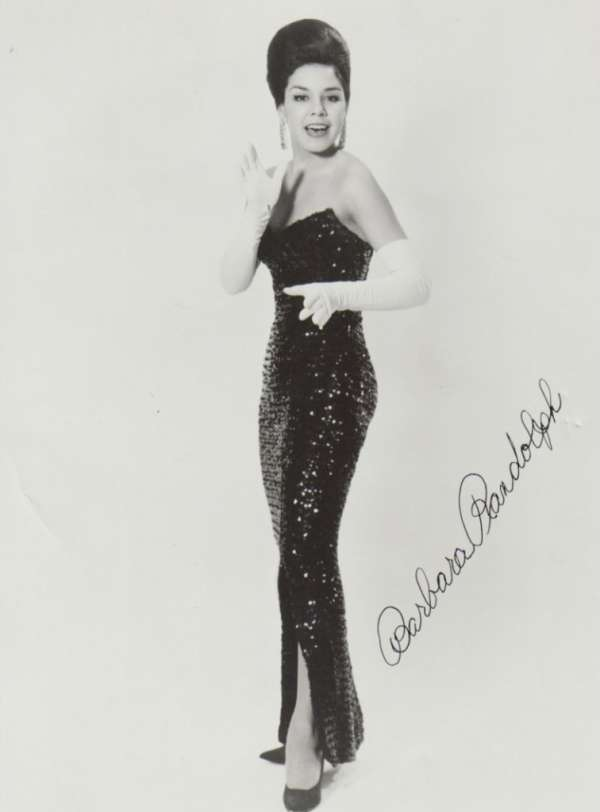
- Barbara Randolph, circa 1962

Background information
- Born: May 5, 1942; Detroit, Michigan, U.S.
- Died: July 15, 2002 (aged 60) South Africa
- Occupations: Singer, actress
- Years active: 1951–1989
- Labels: Motown Records; Soul Records; Nightmare Records; Spectrum Records

Barbara Randolph (May 5, 1942 – July 15, 2002) was an American soul singer and actress who recorded for Motown Records in the 1960s.

== Biography ==
She was born in Detroit and was adopted by the actress Lillian Randolph, who appeared in It's a Wonderful Life (1946) and many other movies. Her show business career began – under the name Barbara Ann Sanders, having taken the name of Lillian's second husband – when she was eight years old, playing the part of Tanya in the 1953 feature film Bright Road.

In 1957, both her mother and she joined Steve Gibson's vocal group, The Red Caps, as singers. For a number of years, a common but mistaken belief held that her mother and Steve were siblings, making him Randolph's uncle (although she may have affectionately referred to him as such). James "Jay" Price, a member of the Red Caps from 1952 to 1958, explained that Steve and Lillian only jokingly called each other "sister" and "brother", but they were not related. The story apparently started with a December 31, 1953, article in JET that referred to them as siblings, in Major Robinson's gossip column—which often carried the most outrageous (and unverified) claims from press agents. Further, the 1910 United States Census shows Lillian's mother was already 50, far too old to have given birth to Steve Gibson on October 12, 1914.

Randolph appeared with her mother in Gibson's nightclub acts, using her mother's maiden (and stage) name of Randolph in 1957, continuing to appear with the Red Caps on various occasions in the 1960s.

Barbara Randolph first recorded as a solo singer for RCA Records in 1960. In 1964, she joined The Platters, replacing singer Zola Taylor, but left after a year and one album (The New Soul of the Platters).

She continued to work as an actress, taking the part of Dorothy in the 1967 movie Guess Who's Coming to Dinner. That same year, Randolph signed with Motown Records with the intention of having her act as first a standby and then a replacement for Florence Ballard in The Supremes. Ballard was instead replaced by Cindy Birdsong, and Randolph released two singles for the company on its subsidiary Soul label – "I Got a Feeling"/"You Got Me Hurtin' All Over" (Soul 35038), followed a year later by a version of "Can I Get a Witness" (Soul 35050), using the same B-side.

Neither record was commercially successful, but Randolph was sufficiently highly regarded to tour with Marvin Gaye as a replacement for Tammi Terrell after Terrell became ill.

Randolph also toured with The Four Tops, Gladys Knight & the Pips, and Hugh Masekela as part of the "Motown Sound" show in 1968. In 1969 and 1970, Randolph issued two singles on the LHI label: "Woman to That Man" and "Miracle on 19th Street", but neither got beyond the status of promotional recordings. Randolph focused on entertaining US forces in Vietnam during 1970, returning to paid performances the next year.

Randolph married Eddie Singleton, who had been married to Berry Gordy's ex-wife, Raynoma Liles Gordy. They opened a production company together, and she retired from singing, except to re-record a version of "I Got A Feeling" for the Nightmare label in the UK in 1989.

By that time, the track – and other recordings by Randolph during her brief recording career – had achieved considerable popularity in Britain on the Northern soul dance scene, and since the 1980s has been reissued on several compilation albums. A collection of her recordings, most of which dated from 1969, but had never been issued, was released by Spectrum Records in 2003.

== Death ==
Barbara Randolph died from cancer in South Africa in 2002, at the age of 60.

== Filmography ==
| Year | Title | Role | Notes |
|---|---|---|---|
| 1953 | Bright Road | Tanya Hamilton | |
| 1967 | Guess Who's Coming to Dinner | Dorothy | |
| 1969 | Cactus Flower | Cigarette Girl | Uncredited, (final film role) |
