= Ronnie McNeir =

American singer and songwriter (born 1949)

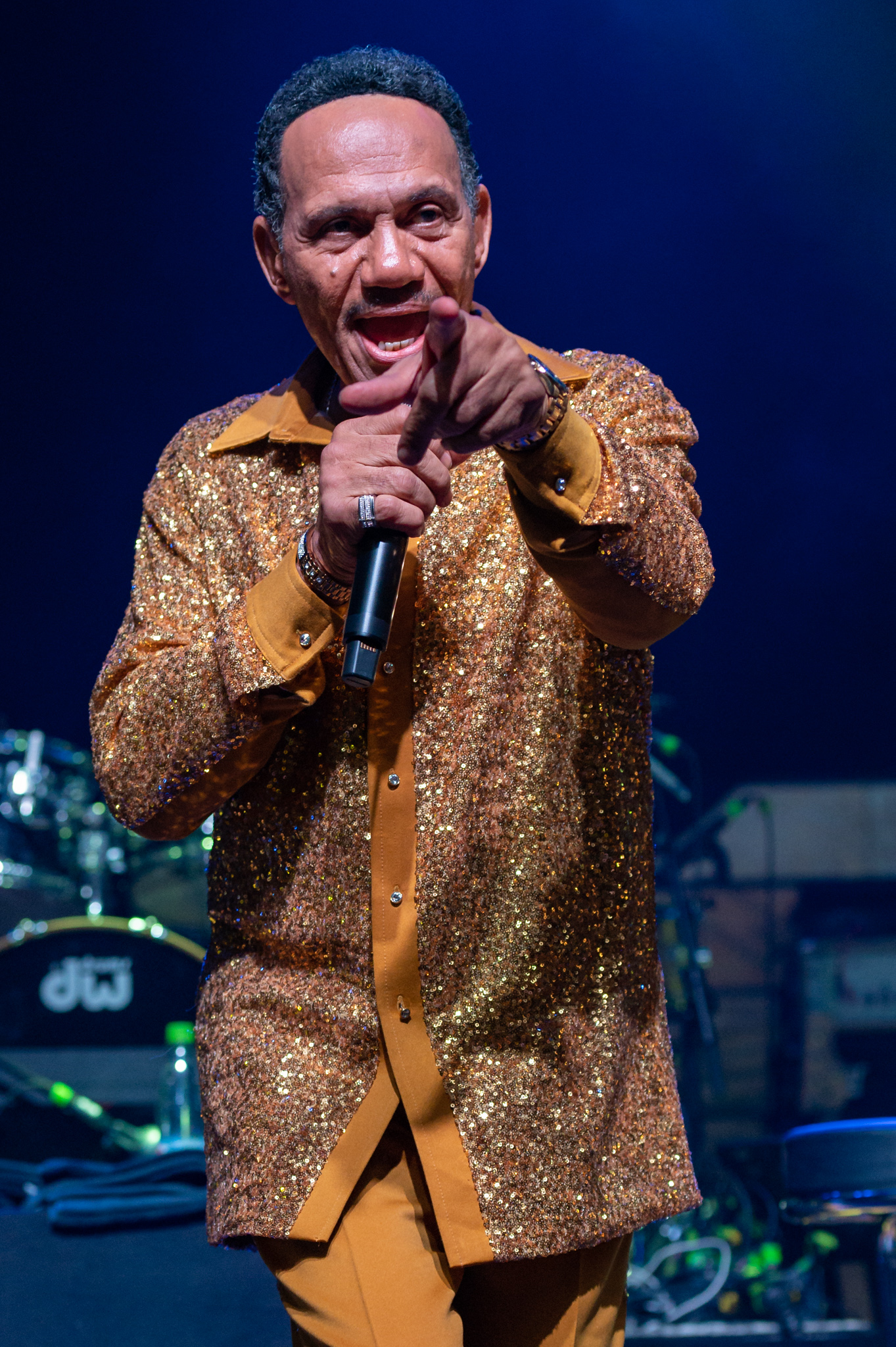
- McNeir in 2022
- Born: Lewis Ronald McNeir; December 14, 1949 (age 76); Camden, Alabama, U.S.
- Occupations: Singer, songwriter
- Years active: c. 1968–present
- Known for: The Four Tops

Lewis Ronald McNeir (born December 14, 1949) is an American singer and songwriter.

== Biography ==
McNeir was born in Camden, Alabama. As a solo artist, he recorded for the De-to, RCA, Prodigal, Motown, Capitol, Expansion and Motor City labels, recording his first song when he was seventeen. His friendship with Kim Weston, for whom he was musical director, led to his recording for RCA, then for moonlighting Motown Vice-President Barney Ales, the owner of the Prodigal label. When Ales went back to Motown, McNeir became a Motown artist, recording the 1976 album "Love's Comin' Down". He would later duet with Teena Marie on the song "We've Got To Stop Meeting Like This" from her 1984 Epic album, Starchild and serve as the musical director for The Four Tops for several years.

He became an official member of the Tops in 1999 when lead singer Levi Stubbs was too ill to continue singing with the group. He has been with the group ever since. He also was nominated for a Grammy Award in the Gospel Music category in 1981 for his collaboration with Rance Allen.

In 2007, he released Ronnie Mac & Company, which featured collaborations with Kirk Whalum, Kathy Lamar and fellow Four Top Theo Peoples. Throughout his career, Ronnie has also worked with Bobby Womack, David Ruffin, Smokey Robinson, Angela Winbush, the Whispers, Carrie Lucas and Eddie Kendricks.

== Discography ==
Studio albums

- Makes A Move (LP & CD, previously unreleased album recorded 1971-1972) Kent / Ace (2025)
- Ronnie McNeir (Ronnie McNeir album)|Ronnie McNeir (LP) RCA Victor (1972)
- Ronnie McNeir (LP) Prodigal (1975)
- Love's Comin' Down (LP) Motown (1976)
- The Ronnie McNeir Experience (LP) Capitol Records (1984)
- Love Suspect (LP) Setting Sun (1985)
- Life & Love (CD, Album) Expansion (1989)
- The Best Of Ronnie McNeir (CD, Comp) Motorcity Records, Hot Productions (1996)
- Rare McNeir (CD, Comp) About Time Records (2) (1996)
- Down In The Neighborhood (CD, Album) Expansion (1997)
- The Best Of (CD, Album) Expansion (2002)
- Ronnie Mac & Company (CD) Jupiter Island Productions (2007)
- I'm Dedicating My Love (CD, Album) Motorcity OMP (2007)
- Living My Life (CD, Album) Sunset Island Records (2011)
