= Joe Stubbs =

American R&B/soul singer (1942–1998)

- Born: Joseph Stubbs; December 9, 1942
- Origin: Detroit, Michigan, U.S.
- Died: February 5, 1998 (aged 55)
- Genres: R&B; soul; Motown; funk
- Occupation: Singer
- Instrument: Vocals
- Years active: 1957–1998
- Labels: Lu Pine; Motown; Hot Wax; Motorcity

Joe Stubbs (born Joseph Stubbs; December 9, 1942 – February 5, 1998) was an American R&B/soul singer who became the lead singer of four different groups throughout his recording career. He was the younger brother of The Four Tops' lead Levi Stubbs.

== Biography ==
Joe Stubbs was born six years after his brother Levi. The two grew up together in Detroit, Michigan, United States. As a teenager, Stubbs joined the R&B group The Falcons in 1957 and led them on several of their early hits, among them the million-seller, "You're So Fine" (1959), and "The Teacher" (1960). He was then replaced by Wilson Pickett, who took over as lead in 1960. Stubbs also recorded a solo single for the Lu Pine label entitled "Keep On Loving Me", released in 1964.

He joined Motown R&B group The Contours in the mid-1960s. Several original members had left in 1964, along with lead singer Billy Gordon, who had departed the following year. A renewed version of the group, with Joe Stubbs as lead singer, began recording. He provided lead vocals on their hit "Just A Little Misunderstanding", which was co-written by Stevie Wonder. The song was a Top 20 R&B Hit in 1966, peaking at #18, and also made the UK Top 40, reaching #31, when it was re-released in 1970. It is the only Contours single to feature Stubbs on lead, as he left the group shortly after recording it. Singer Dennis Edwards replaced him; Edwards recorded with the group until 1967, when he was drafted as replacement lead singer of The Temptations, taking over from David Ruffin.

Stubbs then briefly recorded as a member of fellow Motown group The Originals. The group had come together in 1966, and their first single release, a cover of Lead Belly's "Goodnight, Irene", features Stubbs on lead. Initial Originals singles did not chart, and much of their early time around Motown was spent providing backing vocals for other artists like Stevie Wonder and David Ruffin. They would eventually find success under the guidance of Marvin Gaye, who co-wrote and produced their first big hit, "Baby, I'm For Real" in 1969, although Joe Stubbs had departed from the group shortly after their first single back in 1966. At Motown, Stubbs also recorded at least one song as a solo artist; his "The Girl I've Chosen To Be My Bride" was included on volume four of the A Cellarful Of Motown! series. A second recording, "It’s Love Baby (24 Hours Of The Day)", appeared on the 1967 edition of the Motown Unreleased series.

He then went on to record as part of the group 100 Proof (Aged In Soul) under the Hot Wax/Invictus record label. The label was set up by songwriting-production team Holland-Dozier-Holland who had left Motown in 1968 over a dispute with Motown head Berry Gordy about profit-sharing and royalties. The trio put together 100 Proof (Aged In Soul) as a funk/soul act for their new label. The group released several hit singles between their formation in 1969 and break-up in 1973. Joe Stubbs was made co-lead singer along with Steve Mancha. The group found their biggest success with "Somebody's Been Sleeping", which reached #8 on the Billboard Hot 100, and was later certified gold. A notable Stubbs-led 100 Proof song is the acclaimed deep soul classic, a cover of Luther Ingram's "Ain't That Loving You (For More Reasons Than One)", which also features a spoken word introduction by Stubbs.

Following the group's disbandment in 1973, Stubbs remained retired from recording throughout the 1970s and 1980s. He composed one of the tracks on The Four Tops' 1982 album One More Mountain; Joe Stubbs is credited as co-composer of "Nobody's Gonna Love You Like I Do" (along with brother Levi Stubbs and Four Tops member Lawrence Payton). He did however sign with Ian Levine's Motown revival label, Motorcity Records, in 1989, and there recorded enough material for two album releases, Round And Round (1991) and Pressure Point (1992). Two singles were also released, "Destination Unknown" in 1989, and "You're My Eternity" in 1991.

In addition, a rerecorded version of The Four Tops' hit "I Can't Help Myself (Sugar Pie, Honey Bunch)" was released as a single in 1989, credited to "The Motorcity All-Stars", a group put together from as many former Motown singers as producer Ian Levine could assemble. Joe called over his brother Levi, and they both feature on the recording, along with singers Marv Johnson, Sammy Ward, Cal Gill of The Velvelettes and C.P. Spencer of The Originals. At Motorcity, Stubbs rerecorded many songs that originally feature his brother Levi on lead (for The Four Tops), and some of his hit Falcons and Contours songs ("You're So Fine" and "Just A Little Misunderstanding"), as well as some original Motorcity-written material.

== Personal life ==
Joe Stubbs was the cousin of R&B/soul singer Jackie Wilson.

Stubbs had a wife, Louise, and together the two had a daughter, April. Stubbs was married to Louise at the time of his death.

== Death ==
Joe Stubbs died on February 5, 1998. He had been suffering from heart problems. A compilation album of his Motorcity material, The Best Of Joe Stubbs, was released in 1996, shortly before his death.

== Groups ==
- The Falcons, from 1957 to 1960
- The Contours, from 1965 to 1966
- The Originals, during 1966
- 100 Proof (Aged In Soul), from 1969 to 1973

== Discography ==
=== Singles ===
1964: "Keep On Loving Me" b/w "What's My Destiny?" (Lu Pine, L 120) 1989: "Destination Unknown" b/w "Destination Unknown (Instrumental)" (Motorcity, MOTC 18) 1991: "You're My Eternity" b/w "You're My Eternity (Instrumental)" (Motorcity, MOTC 78)

=== Albums ===
- 1991: Round and Round (Motorcity, MOTCLP62)
- 1992: Pressure Point (Motorcity, MOTCCD80)
