= Pat Lewis =

American soul singer (1947–2024)

- Born: Patsy Lewis; October 23, 1947; Johnstown, Pennsylvania, U.S.
- Died: September 2, 2024 (aged 76) Detroit, Michigan, U.S.
- Genres: Soul; R&B; gospel
- Instrument: Vocals
- Years active: 1963–2024
- Labels: Golden World; Motorcity
- Formerly of: The Andantes

Patsy Ruth Lewis (October 23, 1947 – September 2, 2024) was an American soul singer and backing vocalist from the 1960s. Lewis was inducted into the National Rhythm & Blues Hall of Fame twice; as a solo artist in 2015 and as a member of Isaac Hayes Hot Buttered Soul group in 2017.

== Early life and career ==
Patsy Lewis was born on October 23, 1947, in Johnstown, Pennsylvania, United States, and moved to Detroit, Michigan, in 1951. In the early 1960s, Pat, her sister Dianne, and two friends (Betty and Jackie Winston) formed the group, The Adorables, who recorded a record and began singing backing vocals for Golden World Records. Lewis debuted as a solo artist in 1966 with Can't Shake It Loose while also beginning to do outside backing vocals sessions. She met Motown Records' in-house backing group The Andantes, and one day when one of the girls could not make the session for Stevie Wonder's "Up-Tight", Lewis stepped in and did it as well as several other Motown sessions. She signed to Solid Hit Bound Records and released a string of singles, including "Look At What I Almost Missed", "Warning", "No One to Love", "No Baby No", and "The Loser". From the late 1960s on, she became a permanent backing singer for Aretha Franklin, Isaac Hayes and later on George Clinton too. She wrote several songs for Isaac Hayes.

== Later career and death ==
In 1989, Lewis and The Andantes were among the artists invited to join UK producer Ian Levine's mega-project Motorcity Records, a label formed to record new material using former Motown artists. She became the main backing vocals co-ordinator for the label and did several hundred arrangements while she recorded more than 50 tracks with herself and as a lead singer for the re-formed Andantes. Her single Separation (1991) (co-written by Levine and Billy Griffin) was Single of the Week when reviewed in the British soul magazine Blues & Soul. After the label's demise in 1992, she continued to work regularly with Levine. In 1997, she recorded 50 cover versions of Motown and Northern Soul classics, although only a handful have been released on various artists compilations. In 1999, she recorded 76 gospel tracks with Levine for K-Tel. During the 2000s Lewis occasionally toured with Martha Reeves's original backing group The Vandellas and performed in Manchester, England in October 2007; where she had also been scheduled to record a track for Levine's album Disco 2008, an engagement she had to cancel due to health problems.

In 2018, Lewis returned to the UK to perform at the annual Northern Soul Survivors weekender at Butlins, Skegness.

Her death, at the age of 76 was announced on September 2, 2024.

== Albums ==
- Separation (Motorcity, 1991)
- The Best of Pat Lewis (Motorcity, 1996)
- This Is Gospel (103rd Street Gospel Choir with Pat Lewis − 2CD − K-Tel, 2000)
- A Gospel Christmas (K-Tel, 2000)

== Singles ==
- "Can't Shake It Loose" (1966)
- "Look at What I Almost Missed" (1966)
- "Warning" (1967)
- "No One to Love" (1967)
- "No Baby No" (1967)
- "The Loser" (1967)
- "Separation" (1991)
- "No Right Turn" (1991)
