= The Contours =

American band signed to Motown Records

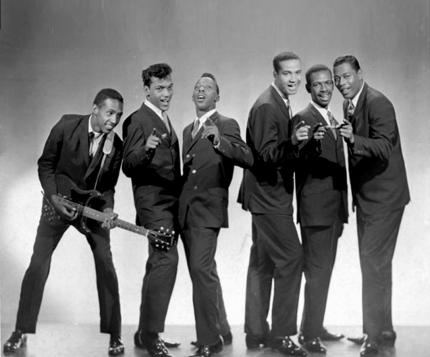
- The Contours. From left to right: Huey Davis (guitarist), Hubert Johnson, Billy Gordon, Billy Hoggs, Joe Billingslea, and Sylvester Potts.

Background information
- Origin: Detroit, Michigan, United States
- Genres: R&B, soul
- Years active: 1959–1968; 1971–present
- Label: Motown
- Members: Joe Billingslea; Al Chisholm; Lyall Hoggart; Dwjuan Brock
- Past members: Billy Gordon; Billy Hoggs; Billy Rollins; Hubert Johnson; Leroy Fair; Sylvester Potts; Council Gay; Jerry Green; Alvin English; Joe Stubbs; Dennis Edwards; Arthur Hinson; Darrell Nunlee; Martin Upshire; C. Autry Hatcher; Odell Jones; Charles Davis; Gary Grier

The Contours are an American rhythm and blues vocal group. They recorded for Motown Records. They are known for their 1962 hit single "Do You Love Me", which sold over 1 million copies and became a major hit again in 1988.

== History ==
=== Establishment and "Do You Love Me" ===
Joe Billingslea (born November 14, 1937) and Billy Gordon founded a singing group called the Blenders in their native Detroit, Michigan in 1959. They completed the group with Billy Hoggs and Billy Rollins, who had responded to an ad placed in the local newspaper by Billingslea. The group soon added Leroy Fair (in place of Billy Rollins), and bass singer Hubert Johnson, and changed the name to "The Contours". In the fall of 1960, the group auditioned for Berry Gordy's Motown Records. Gordy turned the act down, prompting the group to pay a visit to the home of Johnson's cousin, R&B star and Gordy associate Jackie Wilson. Wilson in turn got the Contours a second audition with Gordy, at which they sang the same songs they had at the first audition, the same way, and were signed to a seven-year contract.

Each artist at Motown Records received its own guitarist. Huey Davis was the guitarist assigned to the Contours. The group's first single, "Whole Lotta' Woman," was released in January 1961 and failed to chart. Within months of its release, Leroy Fair was replaced by Benny Reeves, brother of Martha Reeves. Shortly thereafter, Benny Reeves left to serve in the United States Navy and he was replaced by Sylvester Potts. In 1961 the group's second single, "The Stretch", was released and it also failed to chart. In early 1962, Gordy had the Contours record "Do You Love Me," a composition allegedly originally meant for the Temptations. But in a 2008 interview for Mojo magazine, original Contour Joe Billingslea stated that this was not the case. In the article, Billingslea stated to author Phil Alexander that the song's author, Motown founder Berry Gordy, offered the song to the Contours first, only intending to give the Temptations the song after he saw that the Contours were having trouble with it. However, after practicing the tune again, Gordy gave the nod—and the song—to the Contours.

The resulting record, with its shouted lead vocals from Billy Gordon, hit No. 1 on Billboard's R&B chart and crossed over to No. 3 on the Hot 100 in 1962. It sold over one million copies and was awarded a gold disc.

=== Mid-to-late 1960s career ===
Although the Contours never quite repeated the extraordinary success of "Do You Love Me," they returned to the charts four times during 1963 and 1964 starting with "Shake Sherry." They also charted on the R&B Charts with the "B-side" to "Can You Jerk Like Me," the Smokey Robinson-penned "That Day When She Needed Me." In 1964, Billy Hoggs, Joe Billingslea, Hubert Johnson, and Sylvester Potts all left Motown. Berry Gordy hired Council Gay, Jerry Green and Alvin English to back Billy Gordon, making the Contours a vocal quartet (with Davis remaining the group's guitarist throughout their stint at Motown). During this period, tracks recorded by both line-ups were being put together for a second album for Motown, entitled The Contours: Can You Dance (Gordy 910). However, for unknown reasons, this album was never released by Motown. Within a year, Sylvester Potts returned to the group (replacing Alvin English), and Billy Gordon departed shortly thereafter. Gordon was replaced by Joe Stubbs, brother of Four Tops lead singer Levi Stubbs. Stubbs soon quit the act (after singing lead on the group’s 1966 hit Just a Little Misunderstanding),and was replaced by Dennis Edwards. Stubbs would later go on to become lead singer of the 1970s non-Motown R&B group 100 Proof (Aged in Soul).

During the mid-1960s the Contours recorded several records which received R&B radio play, notably "Can You Do It," "Don't Let Her Be Your Baby", "Can You Jerk Like Me," and its charting flip side, the Smokey Robinson-written and -produced "That Day When She Needed Me," "First I Look at the Purse" (written by Miracles members Smokey Robinson and Bobby Rogers)" and "Just a Little Misunderstanding" (the only single featuring Stubbs on lead, co-written by Stevie Wonder). Still they were considered secondary to Motown's major male vocal groups: the Temptations, the Four Tops, and the Miracles. The group's seven-year contract with Motown expired in 1967 and when lead singer Dennis Edwards was recruited to replace the departed David Ruffin as lead singer of the Temptations in mid-1968, the Contours disbanded. Edwards later became a solo hits maker as well.

Although they charted up a hit in the UK Singles Chart in 1970 with a re-release of "Just a Little Misunderstanding," The Contours' real claim to fame lies with "Do You Love Me." Both these tracks and others Contours work can be found on various Motown compilation albums.

=== After Motown ===
In the early 1970s, Joe Billingslea resurrected the group with himself, Arthur Hinson, Martin Upshire, C. Autry Hatcher and former Motown Contour Council Gay as its members and began performing at local clubs around Detroit. During the seventies and early eighties, the group's popularity increased and they played dates throughout the US and even some international dates. In 1984, Charles Davis replaced Hinson and a week later Potts rejoined the group replacing Gay. In 1987, Hatcher left the group and Arthur Hinson returned. In 1988, Darell Nunlee was added when Martin Upshire left. The same year, "Do You Love Me" was prominently featured in the film Dirty Dancing. In 1988, a reissue of "Do You Love Me" sent the song back to the Billboard top 40 charts for eight weeks, peaking at number eleven. The movie and the record spawned a 1988 "Dirty Dancing Concert Tour" followed by a new recording contract for Ian Levine's Motorcity Records, where the group recorded two albums, Flashback and Revenge. Although the latter was not released, the songs were featured on the later compilation The Best of the Contours.

In 1992, Hinson left the group, and it continued as a quartet until 1993 when Nunlee left. Al Chisholm (formerly with the Falcons) and Gary Grier were recruited in 1993. This configuration – Joe Billingslea, Chisholm, Davis, Grier and Potts – continued from 1993 until 2004.

In 2004, Sylvester Potts left to form his own group with the four members (Leroy Seabrooks, Kim Green, Tony Womack and Darell Nunlee) of a local Detroit group named Upscale, which immediately began performing as The Contours. Billingslea sued and Potts countersued, each claiming the rights to the name. Because the service mark "The Contours" was jointly owned by Billingslea, Potts and their manager, these suits were resolved in an out-of-court settlement which provided for the existence of both groups, to be identified as "The Contours with Joe Billingslea" and "The Contours featuring Sylvester Potts," respectively. Within months of the founding of the Potts group, Seabrooks left, making it a quartet. In 2011, Nunlee left Potts' group and was replaced by Tee Turner.

In April 2011, the unreleased second album's tracks, along with fourteen unreleased original Contours 1960s Motown recordings, and new 2011 interviews with the Contours' founder Joe Billingslea as well as with Sylvester Potts, were released as part of the CD compilation Dance with the Contours on the import label Kent Records. It featured the chart hits, "Can You Do It", "Can You Jerk Like Me", and several other tracks. It was released under legal license from, and with the full approval of, the owners of the Motown catalogue.

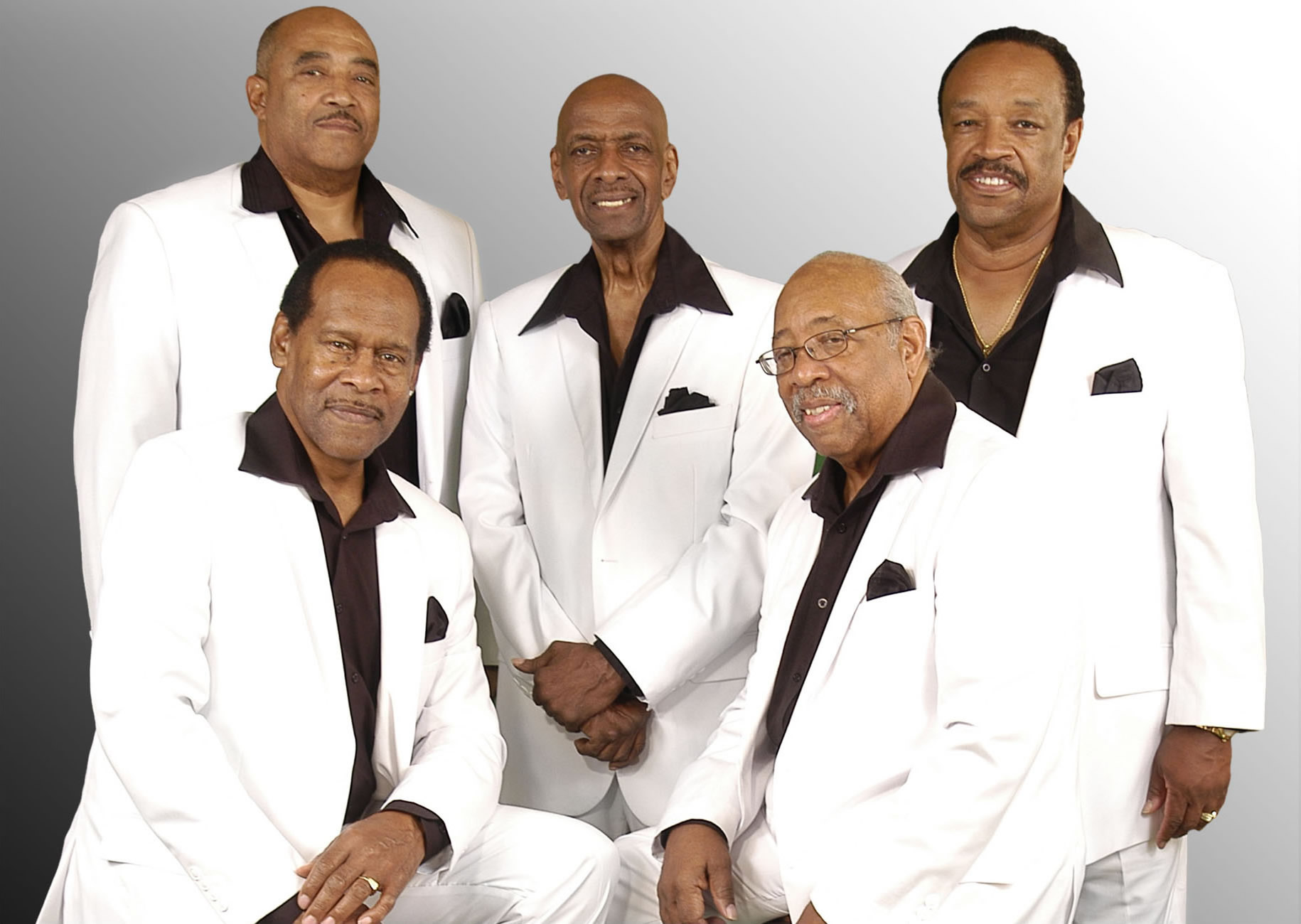
The Contours 2017 Front L to R: Gary Grier, Al Chisholm; back L to R: Dwjuan Brock, Joe Billingslea, Lyall Hoggart

In 2005, Billy Hoggs, who left the Contours in 1964 to become a minister, made his only appearance since 1964, joining "The Contours with Joe Billingslea" for the taping of Motown: The Early Years for the Public Broadcasting System. This performance is occasionally rebroadcast on various PBS affiliates. In January 2007, Motown Records released the DVD of the performances. In 2006, the Contours with Joe Billingslea filled the vacant bass singing spot created by Potts' departure with Odell Jones. In March 2010, the Contours were inducted into the Doo-Wop Hall of Fame of America. The induction show featured a performance by the Contours with Joe Billingslea.

Hubert Johnson committed suicide in Detroit, on July 11, 1981, at age 40. Mid-1960s member Joe Stubbs, brother of Levi Stubbs, died on February 5, 1998. Afterward, several original members died within ten years. Billy Gordon died on May 10, 1999. Guitarist Huey Davis (who was pictured on the Do You Love Me album cover, but was not an official member of the Contours although he was pictured in virtually all of Motown's publicity shots of the group) died on February 23, 2002, at his home in Detroit. Leroy Fair died in December 2004.

In 2014, Jones left the Contours with Joe Billingslea and was replaced by Lyall Hoggart. In late 2014, Potts' group made its last performance. In 2015, Dwjuan Brock replaced Charles Davis. Davis had the longest continuous tenure as a member of The Contours, from May 1984 until May 2015. Also in 2015, the Contours were inducted into the R&B Hall of Fame. The induction show featured a performance by the Contours with Joe Billingslea. Later that year, after it became clear that Potts' group had disbanded, Billingslea's group reclaimed the name The Contours. In 2016, the Contours were inducted into the Michigan Rock and Roll Legends Hall of Fame. In 2017, the service mark "The Contours" was assigned solely to Joe Billingslea.

Sylvester Potts died on January 6, 2017.

On November 4, 2022, before a sold-out crowd at the Ford Community and Performing Arts Center in Dearborn, Michigan, Joe Billingslea announced his retirement 10 days short of his 85th birthday, with that performance being his last, concluding a standing ovation.

Gary Grier died on January 26, 2025.

== Discography ==
=== Albums ===
- Do You Love Me (Now That I Can Dance) (Gordy 901, 1962)
- The Contours: Can You Dance (Gordy 910, 1964 – unreleased)
- The Contours Sing It's So Hard Being a Loser (Gordy G921, 1967 – unreleased)
- Baby Hit and Run (Music for Pleasure, 1974)
- Flashback (Motorcity Records, 1990)
- The Very Best (Hot Productions, 1995)
- The Very Best of the Contours [Original Recording Remastered] (Motown, 1999)
- Essential Collection (Spectrum, 2000)
- A New Direction (Orchard, 2000)
- 20th Century Masters: Millennium Collection (Universal, 2003)
- Live II (Middle Earth, 2003)
- Dance with the Contours (Kent/Universal/Motown, 2011)

=== Singles ===
| Year | Title and catalog number | Peak chart positions | | | Certifications | Album |
| Year | Title and catalog number | US | US R&B | UK | Certifications | Album |
|---|---|---|---|---|---|---|
| 1961 | "Whole Lotta Woman" (Motown 1008) b/w "Come On and Be Mine" (Non-album track) | — | — | — | | Do You Love Me (Now That I Can Dance) |
| 1961 | "The Stretch" (Motown 1012) b/w "Funny" | — | — | — | | Do You Love Me (Now That I Can Dance) |
| 1962 | "Do You Love Me" (Gordy 7005) b/w "Move Mr. Man" | 3 | 1 | — | BPI: Platinum | Do You Love Me (Now That I Can Dance) |
| 1962 | "Shake Sherry" (Gordy 7012) b/w "You Better Get in Line" | 43 | 21 | — | | Do You Love Me (Now That I Can Dance) |
| 1963 | "Don't Let Her Be Your Baby" (Gordy 7016) b/w "It Must Be Love" (from Do You Love Me (Now That I Can Dance)) | 64 | — | — | | Baby Hit and Run |
| 1963 | "Pa I Need a Car" (Gordy 7019) b/w "You Get Ugly" | — | — | — | | Non-album track |
| 1964 | "Can You Do It" (Gordy 7029) b/w "I'll Stand by You" (Non-album track) | 41 | — | — | | Baby Hit and Run |
| 1964 | "Can You Jerk Like Me" (Gordy 7037) b/w "That Day When She Needed Me" (Non-album track) | 47 | 15 | — | | Baby Hit and Run |
| 1965 | "First I Look at the Purse" (Gordy 7044) b/w "Searching for a Girl" (Non-album track) | 57 | 12 | — | | Baby Hit and Run |
| 1966 | "Just a Little Misunderstanding" (Gordy 7052) b/w "Determination" | 85 | 18 | 31 (1970) | | Baby Hit and Run |
| 1967 | "It's So Hard Being a Loser" (Gordy 7059) b/w "Your Love Grows More Precious Every Day" (Non-album track) | 79 | 35 | 53 (Note: Chart position is from the official UK "Breakers List".) | | Baby Hit and Run |
| 1974 | "Baby Hit and Run" (UK-only) (Tamla Motown 886) b/w "Can You Jerk Like Me" | — | — | 51 | | Baby Hit and Run |
| 1988 | "Do You Love Me" (Reissue) (Motown ZT 41890) b/w "Shake Sherrie" | 11 | — | 76 | | Do You Love Me (Now That I Can Dance) |
| 1989 | "Face Up to the Fact" (Motortown 20) b/w "Face Up to the Fact (Instrumental)" | — | — | — | | The Very Best |
| 1991 | "Running in Circles" (Motortown 45) b/w "Running in Circles (Original Mix)" | — | — | — | | The Very Best |
| 1992 | "Look Out for the Stop Sign" (USMO 4503) b/w "Gonna Win You Back" | — | — | — | | The Very Best |
"—" denotes releases that did not chart or were not released in that territory.
