= Frances Nero =

- Born: Willie Frances Peak; March 13, 1943; Asheville, North Carolina, United States
- Died: November 28, 2014 (aged 71)
- Genres: R&B, dance music
- Occupation: Singer
- Instrument: Vocals
- Years active: 1960–1970, 1991–2014
- Labels: Soul (Motown), Shrine, Motorcity, AJA

Willie Frances Nero (née Peak; March 13, 1943 – November 28, 2014) was an American soul and jazz singer. She recorded for Motown after winning their 1965 talent contest and had a UK hit single in 1991 with "Footsteps Following Me".

== Life and career ==
Peak was born in 1943 in Asheville, North Carolina, and attended Stephens-Lee High School. She performed on local radio, and sang lead vocals with two local groups, the Tams (not The Tams) featuring William "PO Bill" Mills, and the Untils, a group of classmates who included Stanley Baird, Bynum Griffin and Clifford Cotton, some of whom went on to play with such stars as Chuck Jackson and James Brown.

In 1960, she married Detroit, Michigan native Johnny Nero and moved to the city. She almost joined The Marvelettes, but returned to Asheville for a time before going back to Detroit and settling into married life. She had two children, and sang jazz in nightclubs, before entering a talent contest on WCHB, the soul radio station in Detroit, sponsored by Motown. She became the first live performance winner in Motown Records's history, emerging the winner out of 5,000 contestants in June 1965. She was awarded $500, a dozen long stemmed red roses, a recording contract for one year and the honor of being the first female artist signed to Motown's subsidiary Soul label. Her first record release was "Keep On Lovin' Me", written by William Weatherspoon and James Dean, and originally intended for The Marvelettes. It was produced by William "Mickey" Stevenson, and released by Soul in early 1966. However, it was not a major hit. She made no further recordings with Motown, and left the company after three years.

After leaving Motown, Nero made more recordings with Raynoma Gordy and Gino Parks at Shrine Records, which went unreleased. In the 1970s she cared for her mother until her death, and she went on to cosmetology school. She then began teaching the beauty trade, and worked on fashion shows, script writing and other businesses. Later, Frances got married again to Evelton Hines on March 3, 1976, and their daughter Evealyn Hines was born on March 28, 1978. In 1989, she was contacted by Ian Levine, a British record producer and promoter of Northern soul music, and they recorded "Footsteps Following Me", written by Levine with Ivy Jo Hunter and Steven Wagner. Her first recording for 23 years, the single reached No. 15 on the Irish Singles Chart and No. 17 on the UK Singles Chart in 1991, and was dubbed by British disc jockeys "the soul anthem of the nineties". She made further recordings with Gino Parks, and released an album, Out on the Floor, on Levine's Motorcity label. She appeared on Canada's television program, Swinging Time with host Robin Seymour, and on UK shows such as Top of the Pops, The Terry Wogan Show and The Hitman and Her.

She formed her own record label, AJA Records, and released a single in 1996, "Love Ride". A CD compilation of her recordings with Levine, The Very Best of Frances Nero, was issued in the US. In 2006, she issued a DVD autobiography, Mountains, Motown & Motion Pictures, and in 2007 AJA released a CD, Frances Nero Salutes Dinah Washington.

Nero died on November 28, 2014, at the age of 71.

== Discography ==
1965 – Motown Records

- "Keep On Loving Me"
- "Fight Fire With Fire"

1968 – Shrine Records

- "Lady in Waiting" (duo with Gino Parks)

1991 – Motorcity Records

- "Footsteps Following Me" (licensed to Debut Records) - #17 UK Singles Chart
- Footsteps Following Me
- The Best Of Frances Nero
- MotorCity Various Artists Albums

1996 – AJA Records

- "Love Ride"
- "It Ain't The Same Without You"
- For My Very Special Fans – A compilation of Christmas carols

2007/8

- Frances Nero Salutes Dinah Washington
