= Motorcity Records =

British record label formed by producer Ian Levine in 1989

- Founded: 1987
- Founder: Ian Levine
- Distributor(s): PRT, Pacific, Charly, Total/BMG
- Genre: R&B/soul music, pop music, Motown
- Country of origin: United Kingdom

Motorcity Records is a British record label formed by producer Ian Levine in 1989. The label aimed to record new material with former Motown artists.

== History ==
Levine, a Motown fan since his childhood in the 1960s, was offered a chance to record Kim Weston on his Hi-NRG label Nightmare in 1987. The result Signal Your Intention topped the UK Hi-NRG charts and met with enthusiasm from Motown fans. Kim Weston brought other former Motown acts to the label, including Mary Wells (of My Guy fame), The Velvelettes and Marv Johnson. Mary Wilson of The Supremes followed next and during 1988, a full Motown reunion began to take shape. In April 1989, more than 60 artists gathered in front of the Hitsville studios in Detroit, receiving ample media coverage. Later in the year, Levine changed the label name to Motorcity Records.

The various artists compilation Motorcity Magic, 1991

Joined by former Motown writers like Sylvia Moy, Johnny Bristol and Ivy Jo Hunter, Levine and his crew wrote and produced around the clock, getting the backing tapes recorded in London while vocal sessions took place in both Detroit and Los Angeles, but despite the media attention and prominent artists in the roster of the likes of Martha & The Vandellas, and former Supremes Jean Terrell, Scherrie Payne and Lynda Laurence, it proved harder than expected to get the product released. In the U.S., the record companies were reluctant to invest in artists of yesteryear.

In the UK, Levine released several singles and albums, both studio albums and various artists compilations, but ran into a string of bad luck with shifting distributors (PRT, Pacific and Charly) early on. Furthermore, the records, although heavily supported by UK magazine Blues & Soul, were often criticized for having the music recorded with Fairlight samplers rather than using real musicians, which Levine himself regretted years later. "The sound of these records often didn't sit well with old Motown fans that wanted to hear a live rhythm section as much as they did the outstanding unimpaired vocals of many veteran soul singers", former Motorcity employee Ralph Tee said. "At the time it meant that much of the music didn't unfortunately reach its potential". (Quote from The Strange World of Northern Soul box set, 2003.)

Levine relentlessly continued during 1990–91 with the number of artists growing to 108 former Motown acts signed while sinking deeper into financial problems. In 1991, however, Motorcity had a hit single with "Footsteps Following Me" – performed, ironically, by one of the least known artists, Frances Nero, which made it to No. 17 in the UK singles chart. Her dream was short-lived: after recording constantly and receiving no royalties from Levine, she severed her relationship and pursued other ventures. Still most releases continued to sell disappointingly: "Some of the Motorcity albums sold less than a thousand copies each", Levine revealed in an interview in Manifesto magazine in September 2007 as a response to later royalty disputes with some of the artists who claimed not to have been paid.

After a deal with Total/BMG, everything began to fall apart during 1992. After a final single "Darling Darling Baby" (MOTC 114) with Edwin Starr, it was all over, Levine close to being declared bankrupt. By that time, a total of 770 songs had been recorded.

Levine managed to get a US deal with Miami-based Hot Productions which began releasing a Motorcity anthology plus Best of compilations by the artists and succeeded in getting much of the previously unreleased material out. 20 Best of Motorcity Records volumes were released over the years 1993-96 and 30 more had been planned to follow during 1997–98, including 80 new tracks Levine would record with Pat Lewis and Brenda Holloway during those years. Hot Productions, however, closed down towards the end of 1997 before all 50 volumes had been released. Levine's Motorcity recordings continue to be released on various compilations, and Levine himself has recorded new backing tracks for more than 120 of the songs to create a more authentic sound. Songs like Ronnie McNeir's "Lucky Number", Carolyn Crawford's "Timeless" and The Elgins' "Don't Wait Around" have since received more praise on the UK soul scene than the first time round. A lot of these artists were recorded for the last time, many of them have since died – including Mary Wells, Herman Griffin, David Ruffin, Hattie Littles, Saundra Edwards of The Elgins, Edwin Starr, Joe Stubbs and many more.

Levine was also instrumental with the several successful multi-artist package tours, similar in style and format to the 1960s Motortown Revue. A month-long tour in November 1990 featured The Elgins, Kim Weston, Syreeta, Carolyn Crawford, Marv Johnson and was headlined by Jean, Scherrie & Lynda of The Supremes. The final night of the tour was videotaped and released the following year as The Legends of Motorcity USA on two videos.

A three-disc DVD box set with 100 videos from the Motorcity era titled Don't Forget the Motorcity, was released in November 2007.

A DVD box with 100 videos from the project

== See also ==
- Motorcity Records albums discography
- Motorcity Records singles discography

== Sources ==
- Voices From the Shadows (UK Magazine, Issue No. 11, 1989)
- 2-part interview in Manifesto (UK Magazine, Issue No. 86–87, August–September 2007)
