= Joe Billingslea =

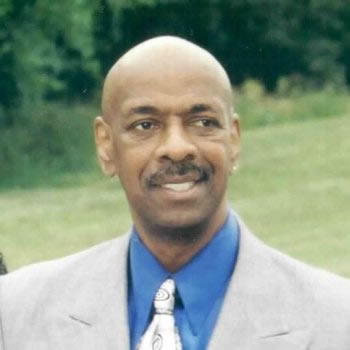
- Billingslea in 2009

Background information
- Birth name: Joseph Billingslea, Jr.
- Born: November 14, 1937 (age 87); Hamtramck, Michigan, U.S.
- Genres: R&B
- Occupation(s): Singer, performer
- Years active: 1958-1964, 1971-present
- Labels: Motown

Joseph Billingslea, Jr. (born November 14, 1937) is an American singer and performer. He is most noted for being the lead singer and the founder of the R&B band the Contours in 1959. The Contours are best known for the 1962 hit single, "Do You Love Me".

== Early life ==
Joseph Billingslea, Jr. was born on November 14, 1937, in Hamtramck, Michigan. Before his first birthday, his parents moved to Detroit where he was raised. He sang with the boys' choir while attending Chadsey High School where he graduated in 1954. After graduation, he enlisted in the United States Air Force. While stationed in the Maine, Billingslea formed a vocal group with four other airmen called the "Revere Tone Five". After receiving an honorable discharge following his four-year stint, he returned to Detroit in 1958.

== Career ==
Upon his return from the air force in 1958, Billingslea was invited by an old high school friend, Billy Gordon, to join his singing group, the Majestics. In 1958, the group disbanded, so Billingslea and Gordon decided to form a new vocal group. Billingslea placed a want-ad in the local newspaper looking for singers. Billy Hoggs responded to the ad and became the group's third member. At Hoggs' recommendation, his friend Billy Rollins, became the fourth member of a group they named the Blenders. Within weeks, Rollins was replaced with another friend of Hoggs, Leroy Fair. In 1959, Hubert Johnson was added, making the group a quintet. At Billingslea's suggestion, the group renamed itself the Contours.

That same year, the group signed a recording contract with Motown. The group released two records in 1960 and 1961 but got their big break in 1962 when the single "Do You Love Me" was recorded on Motown's newest label, Gordy. Within two weeks of its release, the song was at #2 on the Billboard Hot 100, taking the #1 spot on the R&B charts and #3 on the pop charts. It remained on the charts for five months. The song was the Gordy label's first million-seller, and it still holds the record as Motown's fastest rising hit of all time.

In 1963, Billingslea and the group charted another hit, sending "Shake Sherry" to the #21 position on the R&B charts (#43 pop). In 1964, they released "Can You Do It" which reached #41 on the R&B charts. Still in 1964, they recorded a ballad entitled "That Day When She Needed Me". Billingslea, along with Hoggs, Johnson and fellow Contours member Sylvester Potts, departed from Motown in 1964. The group had creative differences with Motown and left.

== Later years ==
After leaving Motown, c. 1964, Billingslea took a job for the Chrysler Corporation at the Dodge Truck Plant in Warren, Michigan. In 1965, he was elected by his fellow United Automobile Workers as chief steward. He resigned from Chrysler in 1968 to join the Wayne County Sheriff's Department. In 1977, he put his years of law enforcement experience to work by joining the Detroit Correctional Department, eventually reaching the rank of Sergeant. In 1972, he returned to the GM studio in Detroit to work with Michael Stokes and Joe Thomas on a project for Sussex Records that appeared as the Segments of Time.

In 1971, Billingslea reunited the Contours. The group, and Billingslea with it, play across the country even today. There have also been several new additions to the group.

== Personal life ==
Billingslea has seven children; four sons and three daughters.

His youngest son, LaMark Jefferson Billingslea, was murdered in 2012. On January 1, 2012, LaMark, the manager of HR's Lounge (a nightclub in Detroit), was killed while breaking up a fight between patrons at the club. At around 1:30 am, LaMark was shot in the neck by an unidentified shooter. LaMark died at a local hospital at the age of 39.

Billingslea's eldest daughter, Dorothy Billingslea died on October 19, 2014, of cancer at the Barbara Ann Karmanos Cancer Institute in Detroit. She was 54.

Billingslea currently resides in the Asbury Park section of Detroit.
