= Ian Levine =

British musician (born 1953)

- Born: Ian Geoffrey Levine; 22 June 1953 (age 73); Blackpool, Lancashire, England
- Education: Arnold House School
- Occupations: Disc jockey; record producer; songwriter
- Years active: 1971–present
- Known for: Blackpool Mecca; Heaven; Record Shack Records; Motorcity Records

Ian Geoffrey Levine (born 22 June 1953) is a British DJ, songwriter and record producer associated with Northern soul and hi-NRG music. He has said that records he co-wrote or co-produced have sold more than 40 million copies in total, such as Take That's "Could It Be Magic".

== Early and personal life ==
Levine was born in Blackpool, Lancashire, England. His parents owned and ran the "Lemon Tree" complex in Blackpool, which included a casino and nightclub. Levine is gay. He suffered a major stroke in July 2014, which left him with severely limited movement on the left side of his body. He has also survived nasal cancer, bladder cancer, sepsis and sarcoidosis.

Levine has spent many years tracing his extended family and has organised gatherings of relatives that received media coverage. He has also written books about his genealogical research.

== Career ==
=== Disc jockey ===
Levine began collecting Motown records at the age of 13, buying from UK record shops and from shops his family visited on holidays in the US. He later collected soul, R&B and Northern soul records. After his parents emigrated to the Caribbean in 1979, Levine sold most of his records to fund the purchase of a house in London.

Levine attended early Northern soul all-nighters at the "Twisted Wheel" in Manchester with DJ Les Cokell. After leaving school in 1971 he became a DJ at the Blackpool Mecca alongside Tony Jebb. He travelled to Stoke on Trent for the "Torch" Northern soul all-nighter, a forerunner of the Wigan Casino events, and DJed at the third Wigan Casino all-nighter. Levine and fellow DJ Colin Curtis were among the DJs who moved the Northern soul scene away from an oldies-only policy and towards modern soul and disco. BBC Radio 1 DJ John Peel later travelled to Blackpool to interview Levine.

When Heaven, a gay disco in London, opened on 6 December 1979, Levine was its first resident DJ, remaining there until 1989. Bill Brewster and Frank Broughton note that he was among the UK DJs who mixed records at a time when the technique was uncommon.

=== Songwriter and producer ===
Levine's DJ play of Robert Knight's "Love on a Mountain Top" is credited with helping it reach the UK Top 10 on re-release. In 1974 he assisted Dave McAleer in compiling Solid Soul Sensations, released on the British Disco Demand label, which reached No. 30 on the UK Albums Chart. With investment from his father, he travelled to New York City and co-produced "Reaching for the Best" with girl group the Exciters, which reached No. 31 on the UK Singles Chart and sold 80,000 copies. He then travelled to Chicago, where he signed three singers: Postman L.J. Johnson, Barbara Pennington and Evelyn Thomas. Johnson's and Thomas's debut records both reached the UK Top 30, and both appeared on Top of the Pops on 19 February 1976.

Barbara Pennington had a US disco hit the following year with "24 Hours a Day" (No. 4 on the Billboard disco chart), as did James Wells with "My Claim to Fame", which reached the same position in 1978. After several albums towards the end of 1979, Levine's record production paused.

=== Hi-NRG and pop ===
According to Levine, the London record shop Record Shack offered him £2,000 in 1983 to set up a joint-venture label, Record Shack Records. Record Shack had been distributing records since 1980. Through his friend Jean-Philippe Iliesco, Levine used Trident Studios and resumed his songwriting partnership with Fiachra Trench after a three-year break from recording.

The label's first record was "So Many Men, So Little Time" by Miquel Brown, which reached No. 2 on the US Dance Club Songs chart. It was followed by "High Energy" by Evelyn Thomas, which became one of Levine's best-known productions; Levine has said it sold more than 7 million copies worldwide. Several other dance singles followed before the partnership with Record Shack ended in 1985.

After several releases on other labels in 1986, Levine set up Nightmare Records in December, which released 90 hi-NRG singles over the next three years. He also remixed dance-pop records for artists including Pet Shop Boys, Bucks Fizz, Erasure, Kim Wilde, Bronski Beat, Amanda Lear, Bananarama, Tiffany, Dollar and Hazell Dean.

=== Motorcity Records ===
In 1987, during the Nightmare Records period, Levine began working with former Motown singer Kim Weston, which led him to record other ex-Motown artists including Mary Wilson of The Supremes, Jimmy Ruffin and Brenda Holloway. After a reunion of around 60 Motown artists, including Edwin Starr and Levi Stubbs, near the original Hitsville USA building, he launched Motorcity Records. The label was distributed initially by PRT, then Pacific, Charly and finally Total/BMG, and closed in 1992 after heavy financial losses. About 750 songs had been recorded, and a further 107 were added in the late 1990s with Pat Lewis and Brenda Holloway. The label's only UK Top 20 single was "Footsteps Following Me" by Frances Nero in 1991.

=== Pop and boy bands ===
After Motorcity's collapse, Levine co-wrote and co-produced hi-NRG-influenced singles for several acts. He co-produced three tracks on Take That's debut album Take That & Party, including a cover of "Could It Be Magic", which won Best British Single at the Brit Awards 1993, and co-wrote their single "I Found Heaven" with Billy Griffin. He also co-produced three tracks with Griffin on the Pasadenas' 1992 album Yours Sincerely, including the UK No. 4 single "I'm Doing Fine Now".

After a falling-out with Take That's management, Levine formed Bad Boys Inc in 1993, who had six UK singles and a Top 20 album. He later worked with Upside Down and Optimystic, both of whom had UK Top 40 singles.

The US label Hot Productions reissued Levine's 1970s and 1980s catalogue on CD from 1993, along with much of his Motorcity catalogue, before closing in 1998. He co-wrote and co-produced the theme music for the 2004 Donna Summer television special "Discomania". In 2010 he formed the boy band Inju5tice; after their debut single "A Long Long Way from Home" failed commercially, the planned album was cancelled and the group and Levine parted ways.

=== Return to Northern soul ===
Levine has said that by 1998 he had tracked down 179 former Northern soul singers in the US for his four-hour documentary The Strange World of Northern Soul.

Following the various-artists album Solid Ground in 2006, named after his 2001 collaboration with Sidney Barnes, Levine founded Centre City Records in 2007 to release new Northern soul-style recordings, and issued nine 24-track albums between 2007 and 2012. After a 12-year gap he released a tenth, Northern Soul 2024, in March 2024, reuniting with his earlier collaborator Fiachra Trench.

== Doctor Who ==
Levine is a fan of the BBC science fiction series Doctor Who. He has said that he helped halt the destruction of old episodes in 1978 and helped recover missing episodes. In the mid-1980s members of the production team consulted him about continuity, in an unofficial capacity.

In 1985, when the BBC announced an eighteen-month hiatus for the series and cancellation was widely rumoured, Levine took part in a media campaign covertly organised by producer John Nathan-Turner. He appeared on ITN's News at One arguing against the decision and, with production manager Gary Downie, gathered actors from the series to record "Doctor in Distress". The single received poor reviews.

Levine also organised a private project to recreate the incomplete 1979 story Shada with animation and newly recorded dialogue from surviving cast members. He had hoped it would be released on DVD, but the range's commissioning editor did not use his animation on the official release. His completed version appeared on torrent sites on 12 October 2013.

Levine produced several extras for Doctor Who DVD releases: the documentaries Over the Edge and Inside the Spaceship on the three-disc set The Beginning, and Genesis of a Classic on the release of Genesis of the Daleks. He is also credited as co-writer of the theme music for K-9 and Company.

Levine has commissioned unofficial AI-generated reconstructions of Doctor Who's missing episodes, using surviving audio and production photos. He has said he spent over $100,000 on the project. Levine has dismissed critics of the reconstructions as a small minority.

== American comic books ==
Levine collected DC Comics and sold his collection in 2008.

== Sources ==
- Brewster, Bill; Broughton, Frank (2014). Last night a DJ saved my life : the history of the disc jockey (Updated and revised ed.). Grove Press. ISBN 9780802146106.
- Brewster, Bill; Broughton, Frank (2011). The Record Players: DJ Revolutionaries. Grove/Atlantic, Inc. ISBN 9780802195357.
- Constantine, Elaine; Sweeney, Gareth (2013). Northern Soul: An Illustrated History. Random House. ISBN 978-0753549674.
- O'Brien, Lucy (2002). She bop II the definitive history of women in rock, pop and soul. New York: Continuum. ISBN 9780826435293.
