= Sylvester Potts =

American songwriter

Background information
- Born: January 22, 1938; Detroit, Michigan, U.S.
- Died: January 6, 2017 (aged 78) Detroit, Michigan, U.S.

Sylvester Potts (January 22, 1938 – January 6, 2017) was a singer and composer as well as an off and on member of The Contours and a one-time member of The Four Sonics. Songs that he has either composed or co-composed have been recorded by The Contours, Mamie Galore, Jimmy Ruffin and The Temptations.

== Personal ==
Sylvester Potts was born on January 22, 1938, and attended North Eastern High School, the same school where Martha Reeves, Mary Wilson, and Bobby Rogers were educated at. Owing to his love of the music and the excitement he got from it, Potts once said that he wanted to die on stage.

== Career ==
=== 1950s ===
In the late 1950s, Potts was a member of a group called The Hi-Fidelities whose line up consisted of Huey Davis, Potts, Juanita Davis and Tony York. They released two singles, "Street Of Loneliness" bw Pott's own composition, "Help Murder Police" on Hi-Q 5000 in 1957, and "Last Night I Cried" bw "Just Go" on Fortune 528 in 1958. In 1959, Billy Gordon, Billy Hoggs, Joe Billingslea, Potts, and Hubert Johnson formed The Blenders. They would later rename themselves as The Contours. His old friend from The Hi-Fidelities, Huey Davis, also joined the Contours as the group's guitarist.

=== 1960s to 1990s ===
Potts was a member of The Contours in 1961, replacing member Bennie Reeves who was drafted. In 1963, the Contours single "Don't Let Her Be Your Baby" bw "It Must Be Love" was released. Potts and Joe Billingslea had co-composed the B side.

In 1965, a song "How Can I Say I'm Sorry" he had co-composed with Johnny Gilliam and Norman Whitfield was the B side of a Jimmy Ruffin single, "As Long As There Is L-O-V-E Love". In 1966, a song "It Ain't Necessary" he co-composed with Council Gay and Jerry Butler was the A side of a Mamie Galore single released on St. Lawrence Records 1012.

During the 1970s, Potts had joined The Four Sonics and when he was a member of the group, besides himself, the lineup consisted of Johnson, Bill Frazier, and Vernon Williams. This line-up recorded one single There's No Love" bw "If It Wasn't for My Baby", released on JMC 141.

In 1984, Potts rejoined The Contours which had been restarted by Joe Billingsea in the 1970s. He arranged the backing vocals for the Grazing In The Grass by The Monitors, which was released on Motorcity Records MOTCLP 28 in 1990. The 1999 CD version of the Gettin' Ready album by The Temptations which was originally released in 1966 featured "Give It Up" as one of the album's two bonus tracks featuring Paul Williams on vocals. Potts was the producer and co-wrote it with Mary Wells.

=== 2000s ===
In 2004, Potts left the group and either joined or started a group with Leroy Searooks, Kim Green, Tony Womack and Darrell Nunlee called Upscale. Shortly afterwards, the group changed its name to The Contours and legal action followed with Joe Billingsea and Potts suing each other. The result was one group being allowed to perform as The Contours with Joe Billingsea and the other going by the name of The Contours featuring Sylvester Potts. In 2010, at age 71, Potts and his group appeared at the Harmony Hall Regional Center in Fort Washington.

== Death ==
Potts died on January 6, 2017, at age 78, at a local Detroit hospital. His funeral was held on January 13 at the Historic Little Rock Missionary Baptist Church in Detroit.

== Credits (selective) ==
Compositions
Title	Appears on	Release info	Year	F	Notes
"Help Murder Police"	The Hi-Fidelities - "Street Of Loneliness" / "Help Murder Police"	Hi-Q 5000	1957	7" Single	
"It Must Be Love"	The Contours - "Don't Let Her Be Your Baby" / "It Must Be Love"	Gordy GORDY 7016	1963	7" Single	Co-written with Joe Billingslea
"How Can I Say I'm Sorry"	Jimmy Ruffin - "As Long As There Is L-O-V-E Love" / "How Can I Say I'm Sorry"	Soul S-35016	1965	7" single	Co-written with Johnny Gilliam, Norman Whitfield
"It Ain't Necessary"	Mamie Galore - "It Ain't Necessary" / "Don't Think I Could Stand It"	St. Lawrence Records 1012	1966	7" single	Co-written with Council Gay, Jerry Butler
"Your Love Grows More Precious Every Day"	The Contours – "It's So Hard Being A Loser" / "Your Love Grows More Precious Every Day"	Gordy G 7059	1967	7" single	Co-written with Huey Davis
"One Day Too Late"	The Contours – The Best Of The Contours	Motorcity Records HTCD 7713–2	1996	CD album	Co-written with Ian Levine
"Flashback"	The Contours – The Best Of The Contours	Motorcity Records HTCD 7713–2	1996	CD album	Co-written with Ian Levine, Steven Wagner
"Rise Above It"	The Contours – The Best Of The Contours	Motorcity Records HTCD 7713–2	1996	CD album	Co-written with Ian Levine
"Spread The News Around"	The Contours – The Best Of The Contours	Motorcity Records HTCD 7713–2	1996	CD album	Co-written with Ian Levine
"Storm Warning"	The Contours – The Best Of The Contours	Motorcity Records HTCD 7713–2	1996	CD album	Co-written with Ian Levine
"Give It Up"	The Temptations – Gettin' Ready	Motown 314549514–2	1999	CD album	Previously unreleased track circa 1966
"Do The See Saw"	The Contours - Dance With The Contours	Kent Dance CDTOP 350	2011	CD album	Co-composed with Billy Gordon; Unreleased Motown recordings from 1963/1964
"Party Groove"	The Contours - Dance With The Contours	Kent Dance CDTOP 350	2011	CD album	Co-written with Mary Wells; Unreleased Motown recordings from 1963/1964
"Boy Meets Girl"	The Contours - Dance With The Contours	Kent Dance CDTOP 350	2011	CD album	Co-written with Mary Wells; Unreleased Motown recordings from 1963/1964
"You Hurt Me So"	The Contours - Dance With The Contours	Kent Dance CDTOP 350	2011	CD album	Co-written with Billy Gordon; Unreleased Motown recordings from 1963/1964
"Have A Little Patience (And Wait)"	Mary Wells - Something New - Lost & Found	Hip-O Select B0017285-02	2012	CD album	Co-written with Mary Wells
"Free From Your Spell"	Mary Wells - Something New - Lost & Found	Hip-O Select B0017285-02	2012	CD album	Co-written with Mary Wells
"Trust In Me"	The Contours - (Various artists) - Motown Unreleased 1962: Guys, Vol. 1	Motown	2012	MP3	Co-written with Billy Gordon
"Do The See Saw" (version 1)	The Contours - (Various artists) - Motown Unreleased 1963	Motown	2013	MP3	Co-written with Billy Gordon
