= Hitsville USA: The Motown Singles Collection Volume 2 1972–1992 =

Compilation album

Box set by Various artists
- Released: 19 October 1993
- Recorded: 1972–1992
- Genres: Motown, R&B, soul
- Length: 4:57:58
- Label: Motown

Various artists chronology
Hitsville USA: The Motown Singles Collection 1959–1971 (1992)	Hitsville USA: The Motown Singles Collection Volume 2 1972–1992 (1993)

Hitsville USA: The Motown Singles Collection Volume 2 1972–1992 is a 1993 four-disc collection of Motown hits that were released after the original Motown studios relocated to Los Angeles. The box set was preceded the previous year by Hitsville USA: The Motown Singles Collection 1959–1971.

== Track listing ==
Disc 1
No.	Title	Writer(s)	Artist	Length
1.	"Got to Be There" (1972)	Elliot Willensky	Michael Jackson	3:25
2.	"Floy Joy" (1972)	William "Smokey" Robinson	The Supremes	2:35
3.	"A Simple Game" (1972)	Michael Pinder	Four Tops	2:58
4.	"Walk In the Night" (1972)	Johnny Bristol; Marilyn McLeod	Jr. Walker & the All-Stars	4:12
5.	"Ben" (1972)	Walter Scharf; Donald Black	Michael Jackson	2:47
6.	"Papa Was a Rollin' Stone" (1972)	Barrett Strong; Norman Whitfield	The Temptations	7:00
7.	"Silly Wasn't I" (1972)	Nickolas Ashford; Valerie Simpson; Jo Armstead	Valerie Simpson	2:11
8.	"Superstition" (1972)	Stevie Wonder	Stevie Wonder	4:15
9.	"Neither One of Us (Wants to Be the First to Say Goodbye)" (1972)	Jim Weatherly	Gladys Knight & The Pips	4:23
10.	"Touch Me in the Morning" (1973)	Michael Masser; Ron Miller	Diana Ross	3:28
11.	"Let's Get It On" (1973)	Marvin Gaye; Ed Townsend	Marvin Gaye	4:03
12.	"Keep On Truckin'" (1973)	Leonard Caston Jr.; Frank Wilson; Anita Poree	Eddie Kendricks	3:34
13.	"Boogie Down" (1973)	Leonard Caston Jr.; Frank Wilson; Anita Poree	Eddie Kendricks	3:52
14.	"Dancing Machine" (1974)	Hal Davis; Weldon Dean Parks; Don Fletcher	Jackson 5	2:42
15.	"Do It Baby" (1974)	Freddie Perren; Christine Yarian	The Miracles	3:04
16.	"Shoe Shoe Shine" (1975)	Nickolas Ashford; Valerie Simpson	The Dynamic Superiors	3:47
17.	"Harmour Love" (1975)	Stevie Wonder	Syreeta	3:38
18.	"Love Power" (1975)	Frank Hutch	Willie Hutch	3:34
19.	"It's So Hard to Say Goodbye to Yesterday" (1975)	Freddie Perren; Christine Yarian	G.C. Cameron	3:26
20.	"Love Machine (Pt.1)" (1975)	Billy Griffin; Warren Moore	The Miracles	3:01
21.	"Walk Away from Love" (1975)	Charles Kipps	David Ruffin	3:18
Total length:				75:13

Disc 2
No.	Title	Writer(s)	Artist	Length
1.	"Quiet Storm" (1975)	William "Smokey" Robinson; Rose Ella Jones	Smokey Robinson	4:04
2.	"Love Hangover" (1975)	Marilyn McLeod; Pam Sawyer	Diana Ross	3:50
3.	"I Want You" (1976)	Arthur "T-Boy" Ross; Leon Ware	Marvin Gaye	3:58
4.	"Don't Leave Me This Way" (1976)	Kenny Gamble; Cary Gilbert; Leon Huff	Thelma Houston	3:41
5.	"Got to Give It Up (Pt.1)" (1977)	Marvin Gaye	Marvin Gaye	4:15
6.	"Sir Duke" (1977)	Stevie Wonder	Stevie Wonder	3:57
7.	"Easy" (1977)	Lionel Richie	Commodores	4:24
8.	"You Can't Turn Me Off (In The Middle of Turning Me On)" (1977)	Marilyn McLeod; Pam Sawyer	High Inergy	3:33
9.	"Brick House" (1977)	Lionel Richie; Ronald LaPread; Walter Orange; Milan Williams; William King; Thomas McClary; Shirley Hanna-King	Commodores	3:35
10.	"You and I" (1978)	Rick James	Rick James	3:13
11.	"Three Times a Lady" (1978)	Lionel Richie	Commodores	3:39
12.	"There'll Never Be" (1978)	Bobby DeBarge	Switch	3:36
13.	"Heaven Must Have Sent You" (1979)	Eddie Holland; Lamont Dozier; Brian Holland	Bonnie Pointer	3:35
14.	"Sail On" (1979)	Lionel Richie	Commodores	3:57
15.	"Cruisin'" (1979)	William "Smokey" Robinson; Marvin Tarplin	Smokey Robinson	4:30
16.	"Still" (1979)	Lionel Richie	Commodores	3:47
17.	"With You I'm Born Again" (1979)	David Shire; Carol Connors	Billy Preston & Syreeta Wright	3:42
18.	"Let's Get Serious" (1980)	Lee Garrett; Stevie Wonder	Jermaine Jackson	3:36
19.	"I Need Your Lovin'" (1980)	Teena Marie	Teena Marie	3:53
20.	"Being With You" (1981)	William "Smokey" Robinson	Smokey Robinson	4:00
Total length:				76:45

Disc 3
No.	Title	Writer(s)	Artist	Length
1.	"Upside Down" (1980)	Bernard Edwards; Nile Rodgers	Diana Ross	3:40
2.	"Give It to Me Baby" (1981)	Rick James	Rick James	3:54
3.	"One Day in Your Life" (1981)	Renée Armand; Sam Brown III	Michael Jackson	4:18
4.	"Square Biz" (1981)	Teena Marie; Allen McGrier	Teena Marie	3:44
5.	"Lady (You Bring Me Up)" (1981)	Shirley King; Harold Hudson; William King	Commodores	4:01
6.	"Super Freak (Pt.1)" (1981)	Rick James; Alonzo Miller	Rick James	3:21
7.	"Right in the Middle (Of Falling in Love)" (1982)	Sam Dees	Bettye LaVette	3:43
8.	"Let It Whip" (1982)	Reggie Andrews; Leon Chancler	Dazz Band	4:08
9.	"All Night Long (All Night)" (1983)	Lionel Richie	Lionel Richie	4:19
10.	"Time Will Reveal" (1983)	Bobby DeBarge; Etterlene "Bunny" DeBarge	DeBarge	4:07
11.	"Don't Look Any Further" (1984)	Franne Golde; Duane Hitchings; Dennis Lambert	Dennis Edwards (featuring Siedah Garrett)	4:06
12.	"I Just Called to Say I Love You" (1984)	Stevie Wonder	Stevie Wonder	4:25
13.	"Treat Her Like a Lady" (1984)	Otis Williams; Ali-Ollie Woodson	The Temptations	4:09
14.	"Ebony Eyes" (1983)	Rick James	Rick James & Smokey Robinson	4:03
15.	"Nightshift" (1985)	Franne Golde; Dennis Lambert; Walter Orange	Commodores	4:25
16.	"Rhythm of the Night" (1985)	Diane Warren	DeBarge	3:55
17.	"Somebody's Watching Me" (1984)	Kennedy Gordy	Rockwell	4:01
18.	"In My House" (1985)	Rick James	Mary Jane Girls	3:56
Total length:				72:15

Disc 4
No.	Title	Writer(s)	Artist	Length
1.	"Part-Time Lover" (1985)	Stevie Wonder	Stevie Wonder	3:44
2.	"Who's Johnny" (1986)	Ina Wolf; Peter Wolf	El DeBarge	4:11
3.	"Lady Soul" (1986)	Mark Holden	The Temptations	4:46
4.	"Nail It to the Wall" (1986)	Stephen Broughton Lunt; Arnie Roman	Stacy Lattisaw	3:56
5.	"Talk to Me" (1986)	Nick Mundy; Franne Golde; Paul Fox	Chico DeBarge	3:52
6.	"Just to See Her" (1987)	Jimmy George; Lou Pardini	Smokey Robinson	4:04
7.	"One Heartbeat" (1987)	Steve LeGassick; Brian Ray	Smokey Robinson	4:06
8.	"Dial My Heart" (1988)	Kenneth Brian Edmonds; Antonio Marquis "L.A." Reid; Daryl Simmons	The Boys	4:25
9.	"Him Or Me" (1988)	Lee Drakeford; Gene Griffin; Wesley Adams; Larry McCain; Larry Singletary	Today	4:22
10.	"Your Sweetness" (1989)	Kymberli Armstrong; John Barnes	The Good Girls	4:04
11.	"Where Do We Go from Here" (1989)	LeMel Humes	Stacy Lattisaw & Johnny Gill	4:20
12.	"Rub You the Right Way" (1990)	Terry Lewis; James Harris	Johnny Gill	4:17
13.	"Slow Motion" (1990)	Stan Sheppard; Aaron Smith	Gerald Alston	5:08
14.	"Iesha" (1990)	Dallas Austin; Michael Bivins	Another Bad Creation	4:21
15.	"Motownphilly" (1991)	Dallas Austin; Michael Bivins; Nathan Morris; Shawn Stockman	Boyz II Men	3:54
16.	"I Love Your Smile" (1991)	Jarvis La Rue Baker; Sylvester Jackson; Narada Michael Walden; Shanice Wilson	Shanice	4:25
17.	"End of the Road" (1992)	Kenneth Brian Edmonds; Antonio Marquis "L.A." Reid; Daryl Simmons	Boyz II Men	5:50
Total length:				73:45
