= Turnin' On =

Studio album by High Inergy
- Released: 1977
- Studio: Technisonic Studios
- Genre: R&B
- Label: Gordy
- Producer: Kent Washburn; Al Willis & Dee Ervin; Jimmy Holiday

High Inergy chronology
Turnin' On (1977)	Steppin' Out (1978)

Singles from Turnin' On
- 1. "You Can't Turn Me Off (In the Middle of Turning Me On)" Released: August 2, 1977; 2. "Love Is All You Need" Released: January 1978

Professional ratings
Review scores
Source	Rating
AllMusic	4.5/5 stars

Turnin' On is the debut album by the group High Inergy. It was released on Motown's Gordy label in 1977.

The album was mostly produced by Kent Washburn, who produced all but three songs from album. He produced "You Can't Turn Me Off (In the Middle of Turning Me On)" and "Love Is All You Need", the two singles off the album.

The album reached No. 6 on Billboard's Black Album chart and No. 28 on the Top 200 Pop Album chart.

== Track listing ==
Side One:

1. "Love Is All You Need" (Clay Drayton)
2. "You Can't Turn Me Off (In the Middle of Turning Me On)" (Pam Sawyer, Marilyn McLeod)
3. "Some Kinda Magic" (Al Willis)
4. "Searchin' (I've Got to Find My Love)" (Gary Washburn, Barbara Mitchell, Troy Laws, Kent Washburn)

Side Two:

1. "Ain't No Love Left (In My Heart for You)" (Clay Drayton, Tamy Smith)
2. "Let Me Get Close to You" (Faye Usher)
3. "Save It for a Rainy Day" (James Ingram, Merria Ross)
4. "Could This Be Love" (James Ingram, Merria Ross)
5. "High School" (Jimmy Holiday, Mel Bolton, Troy Laws, Friendly Womack)

== Personnel ==
High Inergy

- Barbara Mitchell
- Linda Howard
- Michelle Rumph
- Vernessa Mitchell

with:

- Sylvester Rivers, Greg Poree, William Bickelhaupt, Gary Washburn, Jimmy Holiday - arrangements
