= Try My Love (Táta Vega album) =

Studio album by Táta Vega
- Released: 1978
- Genre: R&B
- Label: Tamla T7-360R1
- Producer: Winston Monseque

Táta Vega chronology
Totally Táta (1977)	Try My Love (1978)	Givin' All My Love (1980)

Professional ratings
Review scores
Source	Rating
AllMusic	2/5 stars

Try My Love is an R&B studio album by Táta Vega. It is her third solo album and was released on Motown's Tamla label in late 1978. While not as critically acclaimed as her two previous albums, it received the greatest success on Billboard's pop and R&B album charts. The double-sided 12 inch single "I Just Keep Thinking About You Baby/Get It Up For Love" hit the Top 20 on Billboard's Dance Music charts. "I Just Keep Thinking About You Baby" was also a hit on Billboard's R&B charts. It was her most successful single during her Motown years.

== Track listing ==
The following is the track listing from the original vinyl LP.

Side one

1. "Come On and Try My Love" (David Jones, Jr., Wade Brown, Jr., Michael Margerum) - 3:20
2. "I Need You Now" (Brian Holland, Edward Holland, Jr.) - 3:34*
3. "Get It Up for Love" (Ned Doheny) - 6:09*
4. "If Love Must Go" (Will Jennings) - 4:11
5. "Magic Feeling" (Don Grusin, Dave Griffin, Claudio Slon) - 3:51*

Side two

1. "Gonna Do My Best to Love You" (Brenda Russell, Brian Russell, David Foster) - 4:23*
2. "I Just Keep Thinking About You Baby" (Harold Johnson, Gwen Cathey) - 4:21
3. "Whopper Bopper Show Stopper" (Daniel Saunders) - 3:15*
4. "In The Morning" (Marlo Henderson) - 4:15*

As of July 2013, the album has not been commercially released on CD. The 12-inch version of "I Just Keep Thinking About You Baby" was released on Motown's 1996 compilation CD, Funkology, Vol. 3: Dance Divas. "Get It Up for Love" a cover of the Ned Doheny Hard Candy track, has also appeared in several dance compilations, including Motown Disco: Soulful Grooves from the '70s and '80s. "Whopper Bopper Show Stopper" was a cover of the title track of the 1976 album by Jr. Walker & the All-Stars. The latter was written by All-Stars keyboardist Danny Saunders.

On February 18, 2014, the album (including five bonus tracks) was released digitally.

== Production ==
- Producer: Winston Monseque; except *co-produced by Andre Fisher
- Arranger: Al Johnson; except *arranged by Andre Fisher
- Recording Engineers: Humberto Gatica & Kelly Kotera
- Mixing Engineer: Kelly Kotera
- Featuring on bass: Jermaine Jackson
- Design: Norm Ung
- Photography: Suzanne Nyergas
- Lettering: Vigon Nahas Vigon
- Executive Producer & Personal Management: Winston Monseque

=== Background vocals ===
- Stephanie Spruill
- Yolande Howard
- Patti Brooks (courtesy of Casablanca Records & Filmworks)
- Brenda Russell (courtesy of Rocket Records)
