= Steppin' Out (High Inergy album) =

Studio album by High Inergy
- Released: 1978
- Studio: Paramount, Hollywood, California
- Genre: R&B
- Label: Gordy
- Producer: Al Willis; Gwen Joyce Fuller; Kent Washington, Mel Bolton; William Bickelhaupt

High Inergy chronology
Turnin' On (1977)	Steppin' Out (1978)	Shoulda Gone Dancin' (1979)

Professional ratings
Review scores
Source	Rating
AllMusic	3/5 stars
The Virgin Encyclopedia of R&B and Soul	2/5 stars

Steppin' Out is the second album by the American musical group High Inergy. It was produced by the same group that made their debut lp a major hit the previous year. The album didn't do as well as expected and was not as critically praised as the previous lp. It was released on Motown's Gordy label in 1978.

The album spawned the hit single "Lovin' Fever", which climbed the R&B Charts in 1978.

== Track listing ==
Side one:

1. "Lovin' Fever" (Pam Sawyer, Marilyn McLeod) (3:21)
2. "Hi!" (Vernessa Mitchell, Barbara Mitchell) (2:41)
3. "You Captured My Heart" (Al Willis, Troy Laws) (3:24)
4. "Didn't Wanna Tell You" (William Bickelhaupt) (3:44)
5. "Everytime I See You I Go Wild" (Stevie Wonder, Sylvia Moy, Henry Cosby) (3:36)

Side two:

1. "Fly Little Blackbird" (Al Willis) (5:01)
2. "Beware" (Al Willis, Gwen G. Fuqua) (3:26)
3. "We Are the Future" (Jimmy Holiday, Friendly Womack, Troy Laws, Mel Bolton) (3:37)
4. "Peaceland" (Vernessa Mitchell, Barbara Mitchell) (3:24)

== Personnel ==
High Inergy

- Barbara Mitchell
- Linda Howard
- Michelle Rumph
- Vernessa Mitchell

with:

- Charles Fearing, Dave Pruitt, Greg Poree, Jay Graydon, Mel Bolton - guitar
- David Shields, Greg Middleton, James Jamerson, Scott Edwards - bass
- Charles Creath, John Barnes, Kenneth Lupper, Sonny Burke, Sylvester Rivers, William Bickelhaupt - keyboards
- James Gadson, Ollie E. Brown - drums
- Eddie "Bongo" Brown, King Errisson - percussion
- Gary Coleman - vibraphone
- Bill Greene, Ernie Fields, John Stephens - saxophone
- Bobby Bryant, Nolan Smith, Oscar Brashear - trumpet
- George Bohanon, Ray Jackson - trombone
