= Full Speed Ahead (Táta Vega album) =

Studio album by Táta Vega
- Released: 1976
- Genre: R&B
- Label: Tamla
- Producer: Winston Monseque

Táta Vega chronology
Full Speed Ahead (1976)	Totally Táta (1977)

Professional ratings
Review scores
Source	Rating
AllMusic	3/5 stars

Full Speed Ahead is the debut solo album by Táta Vega. It was released on Motown's Tamla label in 1976.

The album was produced by Trinidadian native Winston Monseque, who was also her manager. In a November 1976 interview, Vega cited "Try Love from the Inside", "Try God" and "Music in My Heart" as her favorite tracks off of the album.

== Track listing ==
1. "Full Speed Ahead" (David H. Jones, Jr., Wade Brown, Jr.) 5:15
2. "Try Love from the Inside" (John C. Fox, Sigidi) 3:03
3. "Never Had a Dream Come True" (Stevie Wonder, Henry Cosby, Sylvia Moy) 3:27
4. "Just When Things Are Getting Good" (Alfred O. Johnson) 3:57
5. "Been on My Own for Too Long (In the Wilderness)" (Richard Winarick) 3:51
6. "Love Is All You Need" (Clarence Drayton) 3:30
7. "Music in My Heart" (Michael B. & Brenda Sutton) 3:11
8. "Keep It Coming" (Nickolas Ashford, Valerie Simpson) 2:48
9. "Just as Long as There Is You" (Iris Gordon, Bobby Belle, Tina Brockert) 4:42
10. "Try God" (Jay Graydon, Táta Vega) 4:55

In 2011, the album was digitally remastered and features three bonus tracks. The last two bonus tracks are recordings she made with the group Earthquire.

1. "Full Speed Ahead (Extended Disco Version)"
2. "Sunshine Man" (Táta Vega)
3. "Soul Eyes" (Táta Vega)

The track "Love Is All You Need" was later a chart single for High Inergy. The Ashford & Simpson composition, "Keep It Coming" was previously recorded by Valerie Simpson on her second solo album for Motown and then by Rufus featuring Chaka Khan. Vega also recorded a cover of the Stevie Wonder song "Never Had a Dream Come True". In the same November 1976 interview as above, Vega was also compared to Chaka Khan and Stevie Wonder.

On February 18, 2014, the entire album (including the three bonus tracks) were released digitally.

== Personnel ==
- Al Johnson, Carmen Twillie, Jessie Smith, Julia Tillman Waters, Kathy Ann Collier, Maxine Willard Waters, Vennette Gould: Backing vocals
- Ben Benay, Greg Poree, Jay Graydon, Ray Parker Jr.: Guitars
- Michel Rubini, Sonny Burke: Keyboards
- Chuck Rainey, Scott Edwards: Bass guitar
- James Gadson: Drums
- Eddie "Bongo" Brown: Percussion
- Gary Coleman: Vibraphone

== Production ==
- Arranged by Jay Graydon
- Produced by Winston Monseque
- Recording Engineers: Humberto Gatica, Milt Calice
- Assistant Engineers: Geoff Gilette, Steve Hodge
- Mixed by Humberto Gatica
- Mastered by Greg Morton
