= Back in My Arms Again =

- US picture sleeve

Single by the Supremes

from the album More Hits by The Supremes
- B-side: "Whisper You Love Me Boy"
- Released: April 15, 1965
- Recorded: February 24, 1965
- Studio: Hitsville U.S.A., Detroit
- Genre: Pop, rhythm and blues
- Length: 2:52
- Label: Motown
- Songwriter: Holland–Dozier–Holland
- Producers: Brian Holland; Lamont Dozier

The Supremes singles chronology
"Stop! In the Name of Love" (1965)	"Back in My Arms Again" (1965)	"Nothing but Heartaches" (1965)

"Back in My Arms Again" is a 1965 song recorded by the Supremes for the Motown label.

Written and produced by Motown's main production team Holland–Dozier–Holland, "Back in My Arms Again" was the fifth consecutive number-one song for the group on the Billboard Hot 100 pop singles chart in the United States from June 6, 1965, through June 12, 1965, also topping the soul chart for a week.

== History ==
Eddie Holland of the Holland–Dozier–Holland wrote the basis sketch for "Back in My Arms Again."

"Back in My Arms Again" was the last of five Supremes songs in a row to go number one (the others are "Where Did Our Love Go", "Baby Love", "Come See About Me", and "Stop! In the Name of Love"). The song's middle eight is almost identical to a later Holland-Dozier-Holland hit, The Isley Brothers "This Old Heart of Mine (Is Weak for You)".

On the album in which this single appeared, More Hits by the Supremes, and on the official single, each member is pictured separately on the front cover, with her signature above it.

The Supremes performed the song on The Mike Douglas Show, a syndicated daytime program, on May 5, 1965, and again on November 3. They performed the song nationally on the NBC variety program Hullabaloo! on Tuesday, 11 May 1965, peaking on the music charts in the following weeks.

Billboard said that "Back in My Arms Again" has "a strong teen lyric and a powerful vocal performance pitted against a hard rock backing in full support." Cash Box described it as "a rollicking, pop-r&b romancer about a lucky lass who gets back with her boyfriend after quite a hiatus." Record World chose it as one of their "Single Picks of the Week," stating that the Supremes are "unbeatable." Allmusic critic Ed Hogan called the rhythm section provided by the Funk Brothers "tight," the saxophone played by Mike Terry "rollicking" and the vibraphone played by James Gitten "dreamy."

== Personnel ==
- Lead vocals by Diana Ross
- Background vocals by Florence Ballard and Mary Wilson
- All instruments by the Funk Brothers
  - Earl Van Dyke – piano
  - Joe Messina – guitar
  - James Jamerson – bass
  - Benny Benjamin – drums
  - James Gittens – vibraphone
  - Mike Terry – baritone saxophone

== Charts ==
=== Weekly charts ===
Chart (1965)	Peak position
Canada Top Singles (RPM)	1
Germany (GfK)	34
New Zealand (Billboard)	12
UK Singles (Official Charts)	40
US Billboard Hot 100	1
US Hot Rhythm & Blues Singles (Billboard)	1
Cash Box Top 100	1
US Cash Box R&B	1

=== Year-end charts ===
Chart (1965)	Rank
Japan Foreign Hits (Billboard)	1
US Billboard Hot 100	37
US Hot Rhythm & Blues Singles (Billboard)	23
US Cash Box Top 100	1
US Cash Box R&B	1

== Certifications ==
Region	Certification	Certified units/sales
United States	—	1,000,000

== Later versions ==
"Back in My Arms Again" returned to the Billboard Hot 100 in 1978 with a remake by Genya Ravan on a single (taken from the singer's album Urban Desire) which was Ravan's only Hot 100 entry, peaking at number 92.

The song almost made the Hot 100 in 1983 via a remake on Motown's Gordy label by female vocal group High Inergy who released what would be their last album, Groove Patrol, from which a near note-for-note remake of "Back in My Arms Again" was released as a single (the group's last) and reached number 105 on the Billboard Bubbling Under Hot 100 chart (without ranking on the magazine's R&B chart).

== See also ==
- List of Hot 100 number-one singles of 1965 (U.S.)
