= Pops, We Love You =

Pops, We Love You or Pops We Love You is the title of:

- ""Pops, We Love You" (song), 1978 single
- "Pops We Love You"...The Album, 1978 album
