= Full Speed Ahead =

Full Speed Ahead may refer to:

== Films ==
- Full Speed Ahead (1936 film), a British film directed by Lawrence Huntington
- Full Speed Ahead (1940 film), a British film directed by John Hunt
- Full Speed Ahead (1951 film), a Mexican comedy film

== Music ==
- Full Speed Ahead (D.R.I. album), 1995
- Full Speed Ahead, a 1990 album by Larry Mercey
- Full Speed Ahead (Pain album), 1999
- Full Speed Ahead (Táta Vega album), 1976
- Full Speed Ahead, a 2001 album by Autoramas

== Other ==
- The nautical term Full speed ahead
- The oft quoted command Damn the torpedoes, full speed ahead, attributed to Rear Admiral David G. Farragut
