= Iris Gordy =

American songwriter and producer

- Also known as: Iris Gordy Bristol
- Born: Iris Gordy
- Origin: Detroit, Michigan, U.S.
- Genres: R&B, pop
- Occupations: Songwriter, producer
- Years active: 1969–present
- Label: Motown

Iris Gordy is an American songwriter, producer, and music executive. She is a former vice president at Motown, where she helped launch the careers of DeBarge, Teena Marie, and Rick James, Mandre, Bobby Nunn and Tata Vega. Her credits include albums by Smokey Robinson, The Temptations, Rick James, Four Tops, DeBarge, Diana Ross, and Tata Vega.

== Background ==
Gordy is the daughter of Mildred (née Hart) and Fuller Gordy, the brother of Berry "Pops" Gordy II. Her first cousin is Motown founder Berry Gordy III.

== Career ==
In 1970, "The Bells", a song she co-wrote with Marvin Gaye, Anna Gordy Gaye, and Elgie Stover, became a huge hit for The Originals. It has been subsequently recorded by a variety of artists including Laura Nyro, Color Me Badd, Sam Harris, Aaron Neville, and Patti LaBelle.

Later, while serving as an executive at Motown, she discovered a demo featuring Táta Vega on vocals. Vega, who was originally signed to the company as a member of the group Earthquire, had been languishing at the company for years. Gordy went on to serve as executive producer on her first two critically acclaimed solo albums. On Full Speed Ahead, Gordy also co-wrote the song, "Just as Long as There is You" with another new artist to Motown, Teena Marie. Gordy was also a producer on All This Love, a Top 10 R&B album for DeBarge.

Additionally, Gordy has worked as a producer with G. C. Cameron, Smokey Robinson, Mandré and High Inergy.

== Personal life ==
Gordy was previously married to producer and recording artist, Johnny Bristol. They had one child, Karla Gordy Bristol, a television host at Beverly Hills Television, an Event Producer and former Motown employee.

== Current activities ==
Presently, Gordy serves on the board of the Rhythm and Blues Foundation. and the board of Motown Museum.
