= You Name It =

Studio album by The Dynamic Superiors
- Released: 1976
- Recorded: Motown Records Studios, Hollywood, California
- Genre: Soul
- Label: Motown
- Producer: Hal Davis, Marilyn McLeod, Pam Sawyer, Michael B. Sutton, Don Daniels

The Dynamic Superiors chronology
Pure Pleasure (1975)	You Name It (1976)	Give and Take (1977)

You Name It is the third album by The Dynamic Superiors released on Motown Records in 1976. The album was arranged by Arthur G. Wright, Gene Page, Dale Warren and Mel Bolton. The cover photography was by Anthony Loew.

In 2012, this album was released on CD for the first time, not by Motown, by Universal Records' Soulmusic.com imprint.

== Track listing ==
1. "Stay Away" (Josef Powell, June Gatlin)
2. "Looking Away" (Michael B. Sutton, Brenda Sutton)
3. "Many Many Changes" (Marilyn McLeod, Pam Sawyer)
4. "Before The Street Lights Come On" (Art Posey, Josef Powell)
5. "I Can't Stay Away (From Someone I Love)" (Don Daniels, Kathy Wakefield)
6. "Supersensuousensation (Try Some Love)" (Art Posey, Josef Powell)
7. "If I Could Meet You" (Marilyn McLeod, Pam Sawyer)
8. "I Can't Afford To Be Poor" (Marilyn McLeod, Pam Sawyer)
