= James Jamerson Jr. =

American musician

James Jamerson Jr. (born James L. Jamerson III; August 24, 1957 – March 23, 2016) was an American bass player and noted studio musician. During his over three-decades long career he recorded with Bob Dylan, Tavares, The Temptations, and many more.

== Life and career ==
Jamerson Jr. was born in Detroit to legendary session bass player James Jamerson, a cornerstone member of Motown's famed house band known as The Funk Brothers.

In the early 1970s, Jamerson, Jr. became an in-demand session bassist. In the next three decades he played on the studio albums by Janet Jackson, Smokey Robinson, and Aretha Franklin, to name a few.

In the late 1970s, he formed a studio disco group, Chanson, along with guitarist David Williams. Their only charted single, "Don't Hold Back" reached No. 21 on the Billboard Hot 100 in 1979 and No. 18 in Canada.

Jamerson died in Detroit on March 23, 2016, at age 58. He had suffered for years with ankylosing spondylitis.

== Selected discography ==
With Tavares

- Check It Out (1974)

With Sylvester

- Step II (1978)

With High Inergy

- Shoulda Gone Dancin' (1979)

With The Crusaders with B.B. King and the Royal Philharmonic Orchestra

- Royal Jam (1981)

With Janet Jackson

- Janet Jackson (1982)

With DeBarge

- In a Special Way (1983)

With Smokey Robinson

- Touch the Sky (1983)

With Teena Marie

- Starchild (1984)

With The Temptations

- Truly for You (1984)

With Philip Bailey

- The Wonders of His Love (1985)

With Bob Dylan

- Knocked Out Loaded (1986)

With Aretha Franklin

- Aretha (1986)

With Wayne Kramer

- The Hard Stuff (1995)
