= Hitsville USA: The Motown Singles Collection 1959–1971 =

Compilation album

Box set by Various artists
- Released: 1992
- Recorded: 1959–1971
- Genres: Motown, R&B, soul
- Length: 5:03:03
- Label: Motown 374636312-2

Various artists chronology
Hitsville USA: The Motown Singles Collection 1959–1971 (1992)	Hitsville USA: The Motown Singles Collection Volume 2 1972–1992 (1993)

Hitsville USA: The Motown Singles Collection 1959–1971 is a 1992 four-CD collection of Motown hits, during Motown's golden age when the songs were recorded at its original Detroit studio. The selections on this compilation were transferred from the original single mixes, which were mixed for AM radio play and 45 RPM singles. Therefore, the tracks are mono. The collection was certified Gold in February 1993 by the RIAA denoting 500,000 units shipped. It was followed a year later by the release of Hitsville USA: The Motown Singles Collection Volume 2 1972–1992.

== Track listing ==
Disc 1
No.	Title	Writer(s)	Artist	Length
1.	"Money (That's What I Want)" (1959)	Berry Gordy; Janie Bradford	Barrett Strong	2:37
2.	"Shop Around" (1960)	Berry Gordy; William "Smokey" Robinson	The Miracles	2:51
3.	"Please Mr. Postman" (1961)	Brian Holland; Georgia Dobbins; William Garrett; Robert Bateman; Freddie Gorman	The Marvelettes	2:31
4.	"Jamie" (1961)	Barrett Strong; William Stevenson	Eddie Holland	2:25
5.	"The One Who Really Loves You" (1962)	William "Smokey" Robinson	Mary Wells	2:29
6.	"Do You Love Me" (1962)	Berry Gordy	The Contours	2:54
7.	"Beechwood 4-5789" (1962)	Marvin Gaye; Berry Gordy; William Stevenson	The Marvelettes	2:14
8.	"You Beat Me to the Punch" (1962)	William "Smokey" Robinson; Ronald White	Mary Wells	2:45
9.	"Stubborn Kind of Fellow" (1962)	Marvin Gaye; George Gordy; William Stevenson	Marvin Gaye	2:45
10.	"Two Lovers" (1962)	William "Smokey" Robinson	Mary Wells	2:48
11.	"You've Really Got a Hold on Me" (1962)	William "Smokey" Robinson	The Miracles	2:59
12.	"Come and Get These Memories" (1963)	Eddie Holland; Lamont Dozier; Brian Holland	Martha and the Vandellas	2:25
13.	"Pride and Joy" (1963)	Marvin Gaye; William Stevenson; Norman Whitfield	Marvin Gaye	2:08
14.	"Fingertips, Part 2" (1963)	Henry Cosby; Clarence Paul	Little Stevie Wonder	3:12
15.	"Heat Wave" (1963)	Eddie Holland; Lamont Dozier; Brian Holland	Martha and the Vandellas	2:48
16.	"Mickey's Monkey" (1963)	Eddie Holland; Lamont Dozier; Brian Holland	The Miracles	2:47
17.	"Leaving Here" (1963)	Eddie Holland; Lamont Dozier; Brian Holland	Eddie Holland	2:33
18.	"The Way You Do the Things You Do" (1964)	William "Smokey" Robinson; Robert Rogers	The Temptations	2:41
19.	"My Guy" (1964)	William "Smokey" Robinson	Mary Wells	2:50
20.	"Devil with the Blue Dress" (1964)	William Stevenson; Fredrick Long	Shorty Long	3:13
21.	"Every Little Bit Hurts" (1964)	Ed Cobb	Brenda Holloway	2:59
22.	"Baby I Need Your Loving" (1964)	Eddie Holland; Lamont Dozier; Brian Holland	Four Tops	2:45
23.	"Dancing in the Street" (1964)	Marvin Gaye; Ivy Jo Hunter; William Stevenson	Martha and the Vandellas	2:41
24.	"My Smile is Just a Frown (Turned Upside Down)" (1964)	William "Smokey" Robinson; William Stevenson; Janie Bradford	Carolyn Crawford	3:03
25.	"Needle in a Haystack" (1964)	William Stevenson; Norman Whitfield	The Velvelettes	2:32
26.	"Baby Love" (1964)	Eddie Holland; Lamont Dozier; Brian Holland	The Supremes	2:38
27.	"Come See About Me" (1964)	Eddie Holland; Lamont Dozier; Brian Holland	The Supremes	2:42
28.	"How Sweet It Is (To Be Loved by You)" (1964)	Eddie Holland; Lamont Dozier; Brian Holland	Marvin Gaye	2:58
Total length:				76:13

Disc 2
No.	Title	Writer(s)	Artist	Length
1.	"My Girl" (1964)	William "Smokey" Robinson; Ronald White	The Temptations	2:57
2.	"He Was Really Sayin' Somethin'" (1964)	Norman Whitfield; William Stevenson; Eddie Holland	The Velvelettes	2:32
3.	"Ask the Lonely" (1965)	William Stevenson; Ivy Jo Hunter	Four Tops	2:48
4.	"Shotgun" (1965)	Autry DeWalt	Jr. Walker & The All-Stars	3:00
5.	"Nowhere to Run" (1965)	Eddie Holland; Lamont Dozier; Brian Holland	Martha and the Vandellas	2:58
6.	"When I'm Gone" (1965)	William "Smokey" Robinson	Brenda Holloway	2:09
7.	"Ooo Baby Baby" (1965)	William "Smokey" Robinson; Warren Moore	The Miracles	2:45
8.	"I Can't Help Myself (Sugar Pie Honey Bunch)" (1965)	Eddie Holland; Lamont Dozier; Brian Holland	Four Tops	2:46
9.	"First I Look at the Purse" (1965)	William "Smokey" Robinson; Bobby Rogers	The Contours	3:06
10.	"The Tracks of My Tears" (1965)	William "Smokey" Robinson; Warren Moore; Marvin Tarplin	The Miracles	3:03
11.	"It's the Same Old Song" (1965)	Eddie Holland; Lamont Dozier; Brian Holland	Four Tops	2:46
12.	"Love (Makes Me Do Foolish Things)" (1965)	Eddie Holland; Lamont Dozier; Brian Holland	Martha and the Vandellas	2:57
13.	"Take Me in Your Arms (Rock Me a Little While)" (1965)	Eddie Holland; Lamont Dozier; Brian Holland	Kim Weston	2:58
14.	"Uptight (Everything's Alright)" (1965)	Stevie Wonder; Sylvia Moy; Henry Cosby	Stevie Wonder	2:54
15.	"Don't Mess with Bill" (1965)	William "Smokey" Robinson	The Marvelettes	2:50
16.	"Darling Baby" (1965)	Eddie Holland; Lamont Dozier; Brian Holland	The Elgins	2:36
17.	"This Old Heart of Mine (Is Weak for You)" (1966)	Eddie Holland; Lamont Dozier; Brian Holland	The Isley Brothers	2:46
18.	"Greetings (This Is Uncle Sam)" (1966)	Robert Bateman; Ronnie Dunbar; Lawrence Horn; Richard Street; Sandra Fagin; John Fagin; Warren Harris; Brian Holland	The Monitors	3:03
19.	"Function at the Junction" (1966)	Frederick Long; Eddie Holland	Shorty Long	2:49
20.	"(I'm a) Road Runner" (1966)	Eddie Holland; Lamont Dozier; Brian Holland	Jr. Walker & The All-Stars	2:49
21.	"Ain't Too Proud to Beg" (1966)	Norman Whitfield; Eddie Holland	The Temptations	2:34
22.	"What Becomes of the Brokenhearted" (1966)	William Weatherspoon; Paul Riser; James Dean	Jimmy Ruffin	3:03
23.	"How Sweet It Is (To Be Loved by You)" (1966)	Eddie Holland; Lamont Dozier; Brian Holland	Jr. Walker & The All-Stars	3:03
24.	"Love's Gone Bad" (1966)	Eddie Holland; Lamont Dozier; Brian Holland	Chris Clark	2:24
25.	"You Can't Hurry Love" (1966)	Eddie Holland; Lamont Dozier; Brian Holland	The Supremes	2:52
26.	"Beauty Is Only Skin Deep" (1966)	Norman Whitfield; Eddie Holland	The Temptations	2:24
27.	"Heaven Must Have Sent You" (1966)	Eddie Holland; Lamont Dozier; Brian Holland	The Elgins	2:33
Total length:				75:25

Disc 3
No.	Title	Writer(s)	Artist	Length
1.	"Reach Out I'll Be There" (1966)	Eddie Holland; Lamont Dozier; Brian Holland	Four Tops	3:01
2.	"(I Know) I'm Losing You" (1966)	Norman Whitfield; Cornelius Grant; Eddie Holland	The Temptations	2:28
3.	"Standing in the Shadows of Love" (1966)	Eddie Holland; Lamont Dozier; Brian Holland	Four Tops	2:39
4.	"It Takes Two" (1966)	William Stevenson; Sylvia Moy	Marvin Gaye & Kim Weston	3:00
5.	"The Hunter Gets Captured by the Game" (1966)	William "Smokey" Robinson	The Marvelettes	2:52
6.	"Jimmy Mack" (1967)	Eddie Holland; Lamont Dozier; Brian Holland	Martha and the Vandellas	2:54
7.	"Bernadette" (1967)	Eddie Holland; Lamont Dozier; Brian Holland	Four Tops	3:02
8.	"Ain't No Mountain High Enough" (1967)	Nickolas Ashford; Valerie Simpson	Marvin Gaye & Tammi Terrell	2:29
9.	"More Love" (1967)	William "Smokey" Robinson	Smokey Robinson & The Miracles	2:49
10.	"I Heard It Through the Grapevine" (1967)	Norman Whitfield; Barrett Strong	Gladys Knight & The Pips	2:56
11.	"I Second That Emotion" (1967)	William "Smokey" Robinson; Al Cleveland	Smokey Robinson & The Miracles	2:42
12.	"I Wish It Would Rain" (1967)	Norman Whitfield; Barrett Strong; Rodger Penzabene	The Temptations	2:53
13.	"I Can't Give You Back the Love I Feel for You" (1968)	Nickolas Ashford; Valerie Simpson; Brian Holland	Syreeta Wright	2:40
14.	"Does Your Mama Know About Me" (1968)	Tom Baird; Tommy Chong	Bobby Taylor & the Vancouvers	2:48
15.	"Ain't Nothing Like the Real Thing" (1968)	Nickolas Ashford; Valerie Simpson	Marvin Gaye & Tammi Terrell	2:18
16.	"Love Child" (1968)	Richard Dean Taylor; Frank Wilson; Pam Sawyer; Deke Richards	Diana Ross & The Supremes	3:03
17.	"For Once in My Life" (1968)	Ron Miller; Orlando Murden	Stevie Wonder	2:52
18.	"Cloud Nine" (1968)	Norman Whitfield; Barrett Strong	The Temptations	3:38
19.	"I Heard It Through the Grapevine" (1968)	Norman Whitfield; Barrett Strong	Marvin Gaye	3:15
20.	"Baby, Baby Don't Cry" (1968)	William "Smokey" Robinson; Al Cleveland; Terry Johnson	Smokey Robinson & The Miracles	3:59
21.	"Twenty-Five Miles" (1969)	Bert Berns; Jerry Ragovoy; Edwin Starr; Johnny Bristol; Harvey Fuqua	Edwin Starr	3:22
22.	"My Whole World Ended (The Moment You Left Me)" (1969)	Harvey Fuqua; Johnny Bristol; Pam Sawyer; James Roach	David Ruffin	3:30
23.	"What Does It Take (To Win Your Love)" (1969)	Johnny Bristol; Harvey Fuqua; Vernon Bullock	Jr. Walker & The All-Stars	2:31
24.	"I Can't Get Next to You" (1969)	Norman Whitfield; Barrett Strong	The Temptations	2:56
25.	"Baby I'm for Real" (1969)	Marvin Gaye; Anna Gordy Gaye	The Originals	3:20
26.	"Up the Ladder to the Roof" (1970)	Frank Wilson; Vincent DiMirco	The Supremes	3:16
Total length:				77:13

Disc 4
No.	Title	Writer(s)	Artist	Length
1.	"I Want You Back" (1969)	Berry Gordy; Freddie Perren; Alphonso Mizell; Deke Richards	The Jackson 5	3:01
2.	"The Bells" (1970)	Marvin Gaye; Anna Gordy Gaye; Iris Gordy; Elgie Stover	The Originals	2:56
3.	"Get Ready" (1970)	William "Smokey" Robinson	Rare Earth	2:49
4.	"ABC" (1970)	Berry Gordy; Freddie Perren; Alphonso Mizell; Deke Richards	The Jackson 5	2:59
5.	"Ball of Confusion (That's What the World Is Today)" (1970)	Norman Whitfield; Barrett Strong	The Temptations	4:04
6.	"The Love You Save" (1970)	Berry Gordy; Freddie Perren; Alphonso Mizell; Deke Richards	The Jackson 5	3:05
7.	"Signed, Sealed, Delivered I'm Yours" (1970)	Stevie Wonder; Lee Garrett; Syreeta Wright; Lula Mae Hardaway	Stevie Wonder	2:48
8.	"War" (1970)	Norman Whitfield; Barrett Strong	Edwin Starr	3:28
9.	"It's a Shame" (1970)	Stevie Wonder; Lee Garrett; Syreeta Wright	The Spinners	3:09
10.	"Ain't No Mountain High Enough" (1970)	Nickolas Ashford; Valerie Simpson	Diana Ross	3:31
11.	"Still Water (Love)" (1970)	William "Smokey" Robinson; Frank Wilson	Four Tops	3:15
12.	"I'll Be There" (1970)	Berry Gordy; Bob West; Willie Hutch; Hal Davis	The Jackson 5	3:45
13.	"The Tears of a Clown" (1970)	Hank Cosby; William "Smokey" Robinson; Stevie Wonder	Smokey Robinson & The Miracles	3:06
14.	"Stoned Love" (1970)	Kenny Thomas; Frank Wilson	The Supremes	3:01
15.	"If I Were Your Woman" (1970)	Gloria Jones; Clay McMurray; Pam Sawyer	Gladys Knight & the Pips	3:14
16.	"Just My Imagination (Running Away with Me)" (1971)	Norman Whitfield; Barrett Strong	The Temptations	3:53
17.	"What's Going On" (1971)	Al Cleveland; Renaldo Benson; Marvin Gaye	Marvin Gaye	3:57
18.	"Never Can Say Goodbye" (1971)	Clifton Davis	The Jackson 5	3:02
19.	"Nathan Jones" (1971)	Leonard Caston Jr.; Kathleen Wakefield	The Supremes	3:04
20.	"I Don't Want to Do Wrong" (1971)	Johnny Bristol; Gladys Knight; William Guest; Merald Knight; Catherine Schaffner	Gladys Knight & The Pips	3:24
21.	"Smiling Faces Sometimes" (1971)	Norman Whitfield; Barrett Strong	The Undisputed Truth	3:17
22.	"Mercy Mercy Me (The Ecology)" (1971)	Marvin Gaye	Marvin Gaye	2:31
23.	"I Just Want to Celebrate" (1971)	Dino Fekaris; Nick Zesses	Rare Earth	2:53
Total length:				74:12

== Charts ==
Chart (1992)	Peak position
US Top R&B/Hip-Hop Albums (Billboard)	59
