= Clay Drayton =

American musician

- Born: Clarence R. Drayton
- Genres: R&B, pop, disco, gospel
- Occupation(s): Songwriter, producer, arranger, bass player, guitarist
- Instrument(s): Bass guitar, rhythm guitar
- Years active: 1960s–present
- Labels: Motown, 20th Century Fox Records
- Website: www.claydrayton.com

Clarence R. "Clay" Drayton (born August 4 1947) is an American songwriter, arranger, producer, and sideman best known for his work at Motown. He was the arranger on Diana Ross’s certified gold record, “Love Hangover.”

== Career ==
In a career that spans over four decades, Drayton’s songs have been recorded by Al Wilson, Lenny Williams, High Inergy, Táta Vega, and The Jackson 5., He Speaks for Songwriting organizations and groups around the world. Drayton Teaches Songwriting at the Songwriting school of Los Angeles in CA. In 2006 he Invented the Phatfoot Drum Harness for drummers & Percussionists. www.phatfootusa.com

== Selected songwriting credits ==
Song	Co-Writer(s)	Performer(s)
"Love Is All You Need"	None	High Inergy; Táta Vega
"Aint No Love Left"	Tamy Smith	High Inergy
"How’s Your Love Life"	None	Al Wilson
"Gypsy Lady Fortune Teller"	Hal Davis	Al Wilson
"Life Of The Party"	Tamy Smith;	The Jackson 5
"She's a Rhythm Child"	Ruth Talmage; Hal Davis	The Jackson 5
"We're Gonna Change Our Style"	Judy Cheeks	The Jackson 5
"Window Shopping"	Pam Sawyer; Tamy Smith	The Jackson 5
"Cupid"	Tamy smith	The Jackson 5
"City Lights"	Jermaine	Jermaine Jackson
"No Matter Where"	Tamy Smith;	David Ruffin; GC Cameron
"You Got Me Running"	Judy Wieder	Lenny Williams
"Though We Loved Once"	Judy Wieder	Lenny Williams
"Do It Now"	Ruth Talmage	Bette Midler
"Make Love Last Forever"	None	Karen Pree
"Making Room For Love"	Judy Wieder; Paul Jackson Jr.	Alton McClain & Destiny
"Bring It Back"	Judy Wieder	Alton McClain & Destiny
"Steal Away"	None	Billy Davis Jr.
"Thanks For Your Grace"	Laythan Armor	Roberson Brothers
"I Can't Stop Dancing/Dance Fever"	Hal Davis; Michael Sutton	Supremes
"Stay Together"	AC Drummer Jr.; Roland Washington	Soul Excitement
"Smile"	Tamy Smith; Paul Cutner	Soul Excitement
"It's Not A Song"	None	Debbie Austin & Destiny
"Going Home Now"	None	Larry Laster
"I've Been Born Again"	None	Larry Laster
"Just Say No"	Paul Jackson Jr.; Philip Nicholas	Phil and Brenda Nicholas
"Praise The Lord"	None	Soldiers For The Second Coming
