= Groove Patrol =

Studio album by High Inergy
- Released: 1983
- Genre: R&B
- Label: Gordy 6041 GL
- Producer: George Tobin in association with Mike Piccirillo

High Inergy chronology
| So Right (1982) | Groove Patrol (1983) |

Professional ratings
Review scores
| Source | Rating |
|---|---|
| AllMusic | 2/5 stars |

Groove Patrol was the eighth and final album by High Inergy. It was unique among their albums because instead of using a plethora of producers, the entire album was produced by the same production team. It featured the song, "He's a Pretender," that was a Top 30 Dance single on Billboard and one of their few recordings to hit the Hot 100 pop charts. Smokey Robinson also appeared on two songs. The song, "So Right" was also the title track of the group's previous album. "Groove Patrol" peaked at No. 62 on the R&B charts. Although original member Michelle Martin Rumph is pictured with the group on both sides of the album, she left just before the album's release. She was replaced by dancer Pat Douglas who performed with Linda Howard and lead singer Barbara Mitchell on Motown 25 and on Soul Train promoting this album. Shortly after those performances Barbara Mitchell left for a solo career with producer George Tobin and Motown retired the group.

== Track listing ==
The following is the track listing from the original vinyl LP.

Side one

1. "Dirty Boyz" (Gary Goetzman, Mike Piccirillo) – 3:59
2. "Rock My Heart" (Gary Goetzman, Mike Piccirillo) – 3:43
3. "He's a Pretender" (Gary Goetzman, Mike Piccirillo) – 5:25
4. "Groove Patrol" (Gary Goetzman, Mike Piccirillo) – 4:14

Side two

1. "Blame It on Love" (David Deluca, Ted Munda) – 3:36 (Featuring Smokey Robinson)
2. "Back in My Arms Again" (Brian Holland, Lamont Dozier, Edward Holland, Jr.) – 3:11
3. "So Right" (Gary Goetzman, Mike Piccirillo) – 3:17
4. "Just a Touch Away" (David Deluca, Ted Munda) – 4:05 (Featuring Smokey Robinson)

== Production ==
The following information comes from the original vinyl LP.

- Producers and arrangers: George Tobin in association with Mike Piccirillo for George Tobin Productions, Inc.
- Executive Producer: Berry Gordy

== Session musicians ==
The following information comes from the original vinyl LP.

- Mike Piccirillo – guitars, synthesizers, drums, bells, melodica, background vocals on "Blame It on Love" only
- Bill Cuomo – acoustic piano, Fender Rhodes, synthesizers, bass synthesizers, all keyboard solos
- George Tobin – syn drums
- Abraham Laboriel – bass on "Blame It on Love"
- Rick Zunigar – guitar on "Blame It on Love"
- Maxine Waters Willard – additional background vocals on "So Right"
- Julia Waters Tillman – additional background vocals on "So Right"
