= The Sky's the Limit (Dynamic Superiors album) =

Studio album by The Dynamic Superiors
- Released: 1980
- Genre: Soul
- Label: Venture Records; P-Vine Records (2003 Reissue)

The Dynamic Superiors chronology
Give And Take (1977)	The Sky's the Limit (1980)

The Sky's the Limit is the fifth and final album by The Dynamic Superiors released on the Venture label in 1980. It was available in very limited quantities and is extremely hard to find. This is the only recording with Tony Washington's replacement singer Tony Camillo, a prominent singer, songwriter, who had a hit with the group Bazuka, with the 1975 song "Dynomite". The sessions would later be released on CD in 2003 by P-Vine Records.

== Track listing ==
=== 2003 CD release ===
1. Magic Wand
2. Nobody's Perfect
3. I Can Still Remember
4. Walk Softly
5. After the Song Is Over
6. Spend the Night
7. Hold Me
8. Let's Spend the Night Together
9. Sweet Sugar
10. Love Me Love Me Not
11. Lucky Kinda Guy
12. Diggin' What You Doing
13. Close to You
