= Shoulda Gone Dancin' =

Studio album by High Inergy
- Released: 1979
- Genre: R&B
- Label: Gordy G7-987 R1
- Producer: Numerous

High Inergy chronology
Steppin' Out (1978)	Shoulda Gone Dancin' (1979)	Frenzy (1979)

Professional ratings
Review scores
Source	Rating
AllMusic	2/5 stars

Shoulda Gone Dancin' was the third album by High Inergy. Now reduced to a trio, this album features Barbara Mitchell (Vernessa's sister) on lead vocals, with Vernessa leaving the group during the recording sessions of this album to become a minister and gospel singer. Vernessa is featured lead vocalist on two of the seven songs included, and a brief solo at the beginning of the title track. Barbara would sing lead on the remaining tracks and on all other songs released as High Inergy from this point forward. The album peaked at #72 on Billboard's R&B Album charts and #147 on the Pop Album charts. The album spawned one chart single, the title track, which was a moderate dance and R&B hit. The extended dance mix of the title track also made a respectable showing on Billboard's Disco chart. Because of the sudden shake up in personnel, the album featured no photos of the group on the front or back cover.

== Track listing ==
The following is the track listing from the original vinyl LP.

Side one

1. "Shoulda Gone Dancin'" (Donnell Jones, Anthony Mason) - 9:44
2. "I've Got What You Need" (Marvin Augustus, Patricia Scott) - 4:36
3. "Come and Get It" (Mel Bolton, Gwen Gordy Fuqua) - 3:34

Side two

1. "Midnight Music Man" (Terry Lupton, Chuck Creath) - 3:44
2. "Let Yourself Go" (Roger Dollarhide) - 4:51
3. "Love of My Life" (Terry Lupton, Chuck Creath) - 3:37
4. "Too Late (The Damage is Done)" (Dreda Augustus, Linda Joyce Evans, Marvin Augustus) - 4:20

== Production ==
The following information comes from the original vinyl LP.

- Producers: Anthony Mason, Marvin Augustus, Mel Bolton, Chuck Creath, Roger Dollarhide, Gwen Gordy Fuqua and Kent Washburn
- Arrangers: Anthony Mason, Marvin Augustus, William Bickelhaupt, Mel Bolton, Roger Dollarhide, L. A. Johnson, Donnell Jones and Gerald Lee
- Recording Engineers: Roger Dollarhide, Peter Haden, Bob Robitaille, David Coe and Steve Smith
- Mixing Engineers: Russ Terrana, Jane Clark, Roger Dollarhide and Art Stewart
- Mastering Engineer: Jack Andrews
- Assistant Engineers: Dennis Moody, Peter Haden, Romie Lovrich, Leslie Kearney, Dan Lopman, Ernestine Madison, Gail Ritter, James Warmack, Deborah Scott, Virginia Pallante, John Howe, Brian Vessa and Ralph Lotten
- Art Direction: Norm Ung
- Design and Illustration: Vigon Nahas Vigon
- Logo Design: Tom Nikosey
- Project Manager: Brenda M. Boyce
- Executive Producer: Berry Gordy

== Session musicians ==
The following information comes from the original vinyl LP.

- Nate Alford, Jr. - percussion
- Jack Ashford - percussion
- John Barnes - keyboards, synthesizer
- Kevin Bassinson - keyboards
- Alvino Bennett - drums
- William Bickelhaupt - acoustic piano
- Michael Boddicker - synthesizer
- Mel Bolton - guitar
- Chuck Creath - Fender Rhodes, synthesizer
- Ron Davison - congas
- Quentin Dennard - drums
- Roger Dollarhide - electric piano
- Steve Fishman - bass
- James Gadson - drums
- Greg Grahan - percussion
- Richard Graham - percussion
- John Green - guitar
- James Jamerson, Jr. - bass
- James Jamerson, Sr. - bass
- Gerald Lee - percussion
- Kenneth Lupper - acoustic piano
- Anthony Mason - bass
- Greg Middleton - bass
- David Pruitt - guitar
- Melvin "Wah Wah" Ragin - guitar
- Robert Robertie - drums
- Werner Schuchner - guitar
- Mike Thompson - electric piano
- David T. Walker - guitar
- Benny Wallace - guitar
- Kent Washburn - vibes
- Melvin Webb - percussion
