= Hard Candy (Ned Doheny album) =

Studio album by Ned Doheny
- Released: 1976
- Studio: Clover Studios, Hollywood; Record Plant, Sausalito, California
- Genre: Soft rock
- Length: 35:52
- Label: Columbia
- Producer: Steve Cropper

Ned Doheny chronology
| Ned Doheny (1973) | Hard Candy (1976) | Prone (1979) |

Hard Candy is the second solo album by Ned Doheny. It features his version of "Love of Your Own" (written with Hamish Stuart) which was also recorded with Stuart's Average White Band the same year. The album also includes Doheny's version of his own song “Get It Up for Love” which was originally recorded in 1975 by David Cassidy on his RCA album The Higher They Climb and released by Cassidy as a single. The song was subsequently covered by Maxine Nightingale on her 1977 album Night Life and in 1979 by Táta Vega. Her version was a Top 20 dance single.

== Track listing ==
All tracks composed by Ned Doheny; except where indicated

1. "Get It Up for Love" - 4:44
2. "If You Should Fall" - 3:36
3. "Each Time You Pray" - 3:38
4. "When Love Hangs in the Balance" - 5:12
5. "A Love of Your Own" (Ned Doheny, Hamish Stuart) - 3:46
6. "I’ve Got Your Number" - 3:14
7. "On the Swingshift" - 3:03
8. "Sing to Me" - 3:36
9. "Valentine (I Was Wrong About You)" - 5:06

== Personnel ==
- Ned Doheny - vocals, acoustic and lead guitar, backing vocals
- Ernie Corello - electric guitar
- Colin Cameron, Bryan Garofalo, John Heard, Dennis Parker, Laszlo Wicky - bass guitar
- David Foster - keyboards, Moog synthesizer
- Steve Cropper - electric guitar, backing vocals
- Craig Doerge, David Garland - keyboards
- Jimmy Calire - additional piano
- John Guerin, Gary Mallaber - drums
- Victor Feldman, Steve Forman - percussion
- Brooks Hunnicutt, Fleming Williams, Rosemary Butler, Don Henley, Glenn Frey, John David Souther, Linda Ronstadt, Hamish Stuart - backing vocals
- H. B. Barnum - backing vocals arrangements
- Greg Adams, Chuck Findley - horns
- Jim Horn, Don Menza, Tom Scott - saxophone
- Larry Muhoberac - string arrangement

Technical

- Richard Kimball - executive producer
