= Totally Táta =

Studio album by Táta Vega
- Released: 1977
- Recorded: Kendun Recorders, Burbank, California; Davlen Studios, North Hollywood, California
- Genre: R&B
- Label: Tamla
- Producer: Winston Monseque

Táta Vega chronology
Full Speed Ahead (1976)	Totally Táta (1977)	Try My Love (1978)

Professional ratings
Review scores
Source	Rating
AllMusic	4/5 stars

Totally Táta is an R&B studio album by Táta Vega. It is her second solo album and was released on Motown's Tamla label in 1977. Andrew Hamilton, in his four star review in the All Music Guide stated that "Totally Táta is a marvelous production by Winston Monseque." Of the nine songs on the album, Hamilton singled out the track, "Come in Heaven (Earth is Calling)." "It's surprising that the song -- religious with a secular mask -- has not been re-recorded by any of the new wave of contemporary gospel artists."

== Track listing ==
1. "Mr. Troublemaker" (Michael B. Sutton)
2. "Blame It On The Sun" (Stevie Wonder, Syreeta Wright)
3. "Come in Heaven (Earth is Calling)" (Anna Gaye, Richard Tee, Elgie Stover, Táta Vega)
4. "Deep Inside" (Richard Winarick)
5. "Jesus Take Me Higher" (Helen Lewis, Kay Lewis)
6. "Love Comes from the Most Unexpected Places" (Dave Ellingson, Kim Carnes)
7. "It's Too Late" (Al Johnson, Terry Huff)
8. "You'll Never Rock Alone" (Brenda Russell, Brian Russell)
9. "Ever So Lovingly" (Al Johnson)

In 2011, the CD was released as an import with three bonus tracks. On February 18, 2014, the album (including bonus tracks) was released as a digital download.
