= Give and Take (Dynamic Superiors album) =

Studio album by the Dynamic Superiors
- Released: 1977
- Genre: Soul
- Label: Motown
- Producer: Eddie Holland, Jr., Brian Holland

The Dynamic Superiors chronology
You Name It (1976)	Give and Take (1977)	The Sky's The Limit (1980)

Give and Take is the fourth album from the Dynamic Superiors, and their last on Motown Records. Released in 1977, it includes covers of Martha and the Vandellas' "Nowhere to Run" and Stevie Wonder's "All In Love Is Fair". It is also noted that singer Mariah Carey sampled the song "Here Comes That Feeling Again" for a song she recorded called "When I Feel It" (co-produced by Mahogany) which was intended to be released on her album The Emancipation of Mimi, but was denied clearance for the use of the song by the songwriters (It was leaked out to the internet later, but still remains officially unreleased).

On May 22, 2012, The Dynamic Superiors' Give And Take album was released on CD, not by Motown, but by Universal Records' "Soulmusic Records" imprint.

== Track listing ==
1. "Happy Song" (Reginald Brown, Richard Davis, Stafford Floyd) 6:07
2. "Give It All Up" (Brian Holland, Edward Holland, Jr., Janie Bradford) 3:51
3. "Nowhere to Run" (Holland-Dozier-Holland) 9:07
4. "You're What I Need" (Reginald Brown, Richard Davis, Stafford Floyd) 4:47
5. "All In Love Is Fair" (Stevie Wonder) 4:31
6. "All You Can Do With Love" (Brian Holland, Edward Holland, Jr., Harold Beatty) 3:33
7. "Here Comes That Feeling Again" (Brian Holland, Edward Holland, Jr., Harold Beatty, Marlon Woods) 4:22
8. "Once Is Just Not Enough" (Edward Holland, Jr., Marlon Woods, Reginald Brown, Stafford Floyd) 5:03

== Personnel ==
- Ben Benay, Jay Graydon, Ray Parker Jr. - guitar
- Henry Davis, Scott Edwards, Tony Newton - bass
- John Barnes, Sylvester Rivers - keyboards
- James Gadson - drums
- Bob Zimmitti, Gary Coleman, Jules Wechter - percussion
- Bobbye Hall Porter - congas
- Gene Page, McKinley Jackson - arrangements
- Howard Deshong - photography
