= Hold On (High Inergy album) =

Studio album by High Inergy
- Released: 1980
- Studios: The Record Plant, Los Angeles, California; The Record Plant, Sausalito, California; Motown/Hitsville U.S.A. Recording Studios, Hollywood, California; Golden Sound Studio, Holywood, California; Rusk Sound Studios, Hollywood, California; Evergreen Recording Studio, Burbank, California; Kendun Recorders, Burbank, California; Rumbo Recorders, Canoga Park, California
- Genre: R&B
- Label: Gordy G7-996 M1
- Producer: Numerous

High Inergy chronology
Frenzy (1979)	Hold On (1980)	High Inergy (1981)

Professional ratings
Review scores
Source	Rating
AllMusic	3/5 stars

Hold On is the fifth album by High Inergy. Like their previous three albums, this one was a commercial and critical disappointment. It peaked at #70 on Billboard's R&B Album charts and failed to make the Top 200 Pop Album charts. The album spawned one chart single, a cover of Bettye Swann's #1 R&B hit, "Make Me Yours", which Andrew Hamilton in his All Music Guide review described as "better-than-the-original." Unfortunately, High Inergy's version failed to achieve the chart success of the original, peaking at just #68.

== Track listing ==
The following is the track listing from the original vinyl LP.

Side one

1. "I Just Can't Help Myself" (Donnell Jones, Anthony Mason) - 4:29
2. "Sweet Man" (Marvin Augustus, Patricia Scott) - 4:32
3. "Make Me Yours" (Bettye J. Champion) - 3:30
4. "Hold On to My Love" (Bobby DeBarge, Bunny DeBarge) - 5:03 (High Inergy & Switch)

Side two

1. "If I Love You Tonight" (Eddie Coleman, Jr., Gwen Gordy Fuqua, Gwendolyn Fuller) - 3:53
2. "Boomerang Love" (Angelo Bond, William Weatherspoon) - 3:30
3. "I'm a Believer" (Narada Michael Walden) - 3:50
4. "It Was You Babe" (McKinley Jackson, Angelo Bond, Barbara Mitchell) - 5:04

== Production ==
The following information comes from the original vinyl LP.

- Producers: Angelo Bond, Eddie Coleman, Jr., Bobby DeBarge, Gwen Gordy Fuqua (co-producer), Gambler's Productions, McKinley Jackson, Narada Michael Walden and William Weatherspoon
- Executive Producer: Berry Gordy

== Session musicians (partial list) ==
The following information comes from the original vinyl LP.

- Eddie "Bongo" Brown - percussion
- Ollie E. Brown - drums
- Paulinho DaCosta - percussion
- Bobby DeBarge - piano
- Tommy DeBarge - bass
- Quentin Dennard - drums
- Nathan East - bass
- Phillip Ingram - percussion
- Paul M. Jackson, Jr. - guitar
- Randy Jackson - bass
- Melvin "Wah Wah" Ragin - guitar
- Narada Michael Walden - drums
