= Pure Pleasure (Dynamic Superiors album) =

Studio album by The Dynamic Superiors
- Released: 1975
- Recorded: A&R Recording, New York City
- Genre: Soul, funk
- Label: Motown Records
- Producer: Ashford & Simpson

The Dynamic Superiors chronology
The Dynamic Superiors (1975)	Pure Pleasure (1975)	You Name It (1976)

Pure Pleasure is the second album from The Dynamic Superiors on Motown Records. It was released in 1975. After a 35-year wait, in 2010, this album was finally released on CD in a 2-for-1 set with The Superiors' first Motown album, The Dynamic Superiors, not by Motown, but by Universal's Soul Music.com imprint. The album was arranged by Horace Ott, Al Gorgoni, William Eaton and Paul Riser. The cover photography is by Olivier Ferrand.

== Track listing ==
All tracks composed by Nickolas Ashford and Valerie Simpson; except where indicated

1. "Deception" 4:49
2. "Pleasure" 3:19
3. "Nobody's Gonna Change Me" 5:30
4. "Feeling Mellow" 4:13
5. "Face The Music" 3:08
6. "Hit and Run Lovers" 4:06
7. "A Better Way" (Bobby Gene Hall, Jr., Ray Simpson) 3:38
8. "Don't Give Up On Me Baby" 3:03
9. "Ain't Nothing Like The Real Thing" 4:13
