= Frenzy (High Inergy album) =

Studio album by High Inergy
- Released: 1979
- Studios: Total Experience (Hollywood, California); Crystal Sound (Hollywood, California); Motown (Hollywood, California); Paramount (Hollywood, California); 54 E. Sound (Pasadena, California)
- Genre: R&B
- Label: Gordy
- Producers: Tommy Gordy; Gwen Gordy Fuqua, Kent Washburn, Mel Bolton; Kent Washburn, Troy Laws; Donnell Jones, Eddie Coleman Jr. Charles Creath, Roger Dollerhide

High Inergy chronology
| Shoulda Gone Dancin' (1979) | Frenzy (1979) | Hold On (1980) |

Frenzy is an album by the American musical group High Inergy. It was released in 1979 on Motown's Gordy label.

== Critical reception ==
Professional ratings
Review scores
| Source | Rating |
|---|---|
| AllMusic | 2/5 stars |
| The Virgin Encyclopedia of R&B and Soul | 3/5 stars |

AllMusic wrote that "a few of the tunes are memorable, including the passionate 'Main Ingredient' and the Diana Ross-influenced 'Time of Your Life'."

== Track listing ==
1. "Skate to the Rhythm" (4:03)
2. "Main Ingredient" (3:43)
3. "I Love Makin' Love (To the Music)" (3:54)
4. "Will We Ever Love Again?" (3:27)
5. "Phantom" (3:33)
6. "Heartbeat" (4:19)
7. "Somebody, Somewhere" (4:31)
8. "Voulez-vous?" (4:31)
9. "Time of Your Life" (4:40)
