= Pops, We Love You (song) =

1978 single by Diana Ross, Marvin Gaye, Smokey Robinson and Stevie Wonder

Single by Diana Ross, Marvin Gaye, Smokey Robinson and Stevie Wonder

from the album "Pops We Love You"...The Album
- Released: December 8, 1978
- Recorded: 1978, Motown Recording Studios, Los Angeles
- Genre: Soul; disco; rhythm and blues
- Length: 6:23 (disco version); 3:59 (vocal version)
- Label: Motown
- Songwriters: Marilyn McLeod, Pam Sawyer
- Producers: Marilyn McLeod, Pam Sawyer

Diana Ross singles chronology
"Ease On down the Road" (1978)	"Pops, We Love You" (1978)	"A Brand New Day" (1979)

Marvin Gaye singles chronology
"Got To Give It Up" (1977)	"Pops, We Love You" (1978)	"Ego Tripping Out" (1979)

Stevie Wonder singles chronology
"As" (1977)	"Pops, We Love You" (1978)	"Send One Your Love" (1979)

Smokey Robinson singles chronology
"Ooh Baby Baby" (1977)	"Pops, We Love You" (1978)	"Get Ready" (1979)

"Pops, We Love You" is a 1978 single recorded and released by Motown stars Diana Ross, Marvin Gaye, Smokey Robinson and Stevie Wonder, as a tribute to Berry "Pops" Gordy Sr. (father of Motown founder Berry Gordy), who had died that year from cancer.

== Recording ==
For the duration of Motown Records' tenure in its native Detroit, Berry Gordy's father, Berry Gordy Sr., otherwise known as "Pops", was one of the overseers of his son's label and was one of many to guide its artists, most of which became famous following the release of successful records. Among those who he helped mentor were Diana Ross, Marvin Gaye, Smokey Robinson and Stevie Wonder. At one point, Gaye was Gordy's son-in-law after he married his daughter Anna.

When Gordy Sr. died that October, his son asked longtime Motown songwriters Marilyn McLeod and Pam Sawyer to compose a song in tribute to him and also began to produce a full-length album with other artists. For the title track, Ross, Gaye, Robinson and Wonder were called in to record the song. Ross, Gaye and Robinson recorded the track together in Motown's L.A. studios, but Wonder, who was busy at work on a mostly instrumental piece to a soundtrack for the movie, later called Journey Through the Secret Life of Plants, recorded his part separate from the rest of the trio. His voice was later dubbed. Ross and Gaye were sparked from the recording of the song that they agreed to add vocals to another McLeod/Sawyer composition, the lite funk-laden, socially conscious "I'll Keep My Light in My Window", marking their first studio duet since the Diana & Marvin sessions of 1972. Unlike the 1972 sessions, Gaye and Ross recorded the duet together.

== Reception ==
Billboard listed the single in its Top Single Picks, meaning that the magazine predicted that the single would reach the top 30 on the Hot 100. The reviewer wrote, "Outstanding vocal performances by these four premiere singers highlights this song written for Berry Gordy Sr.'s 90th birthday. However, rather the lyric content leaves something to be desired and takes away from the glittering vocals, especially Stevie Wonder's."

J. Randy Taraborrelli, writing in Diana Ross: A Biography, commented, "It would seem that a song such as 'Pops, We Love You,' featuring Motown's biggest superstars, couldn't miss. But, while Diana Ross, Marvin Gaye, Smokey Robinson and Stevie Wonder all turned in strong performances, this tribute to Berry Gordy's father was just too much of a novelty to be taken seriously." David Ritz, writing in Divided Soul: The Life of Marvin Gaye, said that Gaye, Wonder, Robinson, and Ross formed "a spirited quartet" and that the song was "infectious", noting that Gaye had "boundless love" for Pops Gordy. Gaye was quoted as saying, "'If Pops had been my father instead of Berry's, ... maybe I could have achieved as much as Berry.'"

== Release ==
The song was issued as a single in December 1978, just before the Christmas season. The 7-inch and 12-inch releases of the single had the song's 45rpm shaped around a red heart. The song was a mild hit upon its release reaching as high as number 59 on the Billboard Hot 100 in February 1979, while reaching number 66 on the UK Singles chart. It fared better on the U.S. R&B charts, peaking at number 26.

The disco version and the single version of the song were placed on the final track listing of the Pops, We Love You album.

Later in 1979, several department stores in Los Angeles used "Pops, We Love You" as the theme song of their promotional campaign for Father's Day.
