= Dynamic Superiors =

US musical group

The Dynamic Superiors are an American Motown group from Washington, D.C., United States.

The group formed in 1963 with members Tony Washington (lead), George Spann (first tenor), George Peterback Jr. (second tenor), Michael McCalpin (baritone), and Maurice Washington (bass). They recorded a 45 released on the New York SUE label in 1969, "I'd Rather Die". The song was written by the group's bass singer Maurice Washington (brother of lead singer Tony). They were discovered by Motown executive, Ewart Abner, at a 1972 DJ convention in Atlanta and signed to the label. After a slight name change to The Dynamic Superiors it was another two years before Motown released a record by the group. The songs on their first two albums were mostly written by Ashford & Simpson. They recorded with moderate success throughout the 1970s. One of their best selling hits was "Shoe Shoe Shine" in 1975. They were unique in that Tony Washington was openly gay, and sometimes dressed in drag onstage. The group's last recording came in 1980.

Original lead singer Tony Washington died in 1989.

Original member George Spann joined The Flamingos in 2001. The group was then reformed by George Spann in 2006, following the break-up of the Flamingos. The other members were three of the other Flamingos members: Larry Jordan, Earnest "Just Mike" Gilbert, and James Faison.

In 2010, Universal Music's subsidiary, Soul Music.Com Records, finally released The Dynamic Superiors' first two Motown albums, The Dynamic Superiors and Pure Pleasure on CD for the first time, in a 2-for-1 set (SMCR2 5003).

== Discography ==
All albums recorded on Motown Records, unless otherwise noted

- The Dynamic Superiors (1975)
- Pure Pleasure (1975)
- You Name It (1976)
- Give and Take (1977)
- The Sky's the Limit (1980, Venture Records)
