= Hitsville U.S.A. =

Nickname given to Motown's first headquarters

Coordinates: 42°21′51″N 83°5′18″W

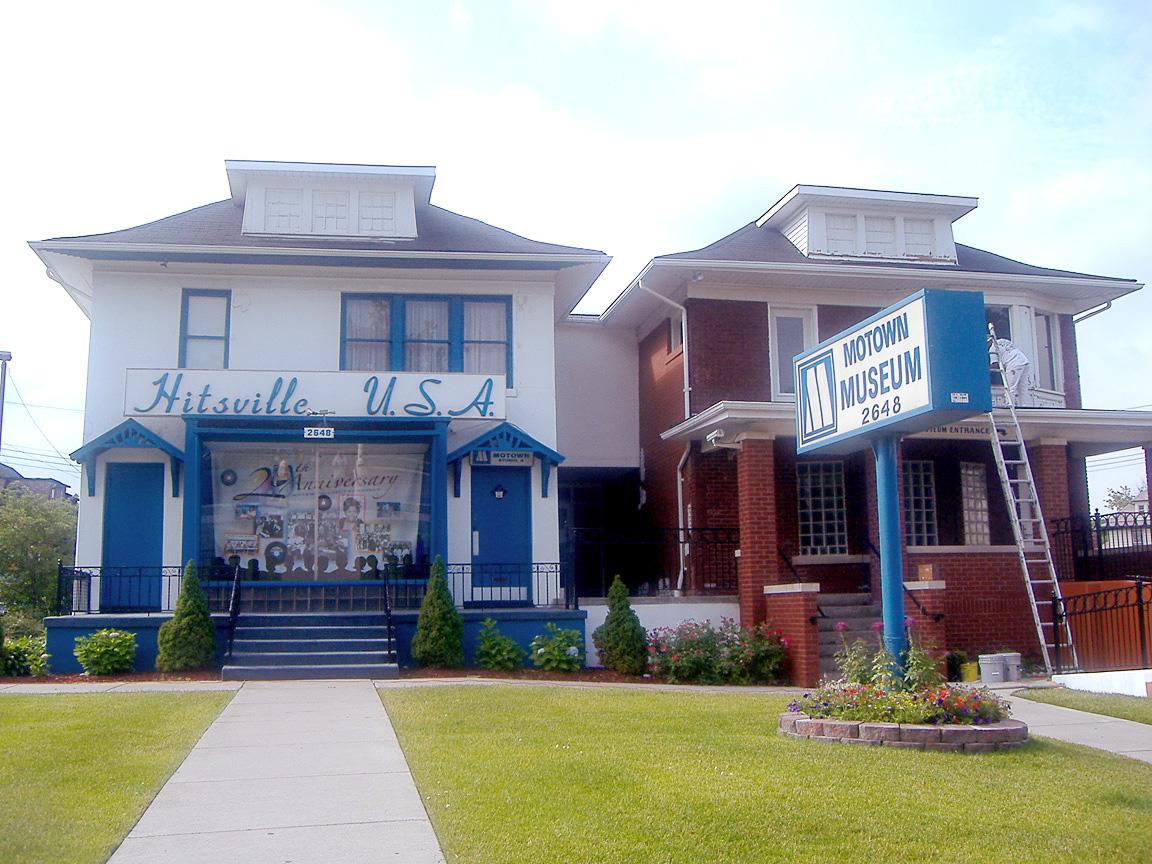
The Hitsville U.S.A. building in Detroit

"Hitsville U.S.A." is the nickname given to Motown's first headquarters and recording studio. The house (formerly a photographers' studio) is located at 2648 West Grand Boulevard in Detroit near the New Center area of the city. Motown founder Berry Gordy bought the house in 1959.

Gordy converted the house to use it as the record label's administrative building and recording studio. After finding mainstream success from the mid-1960s to the mid-1970s, Gordy moved the label to Los Angeles and established the Hitsville West studio working in television and film production as well as music production.

Today, the "Hitsville U.S.A." property operates as the Motown Museum, which is dedicated to the legacy of the record label's artists and music. The museum occupies the original house and an adjacent former residence.

== West Grand Boulevard ==
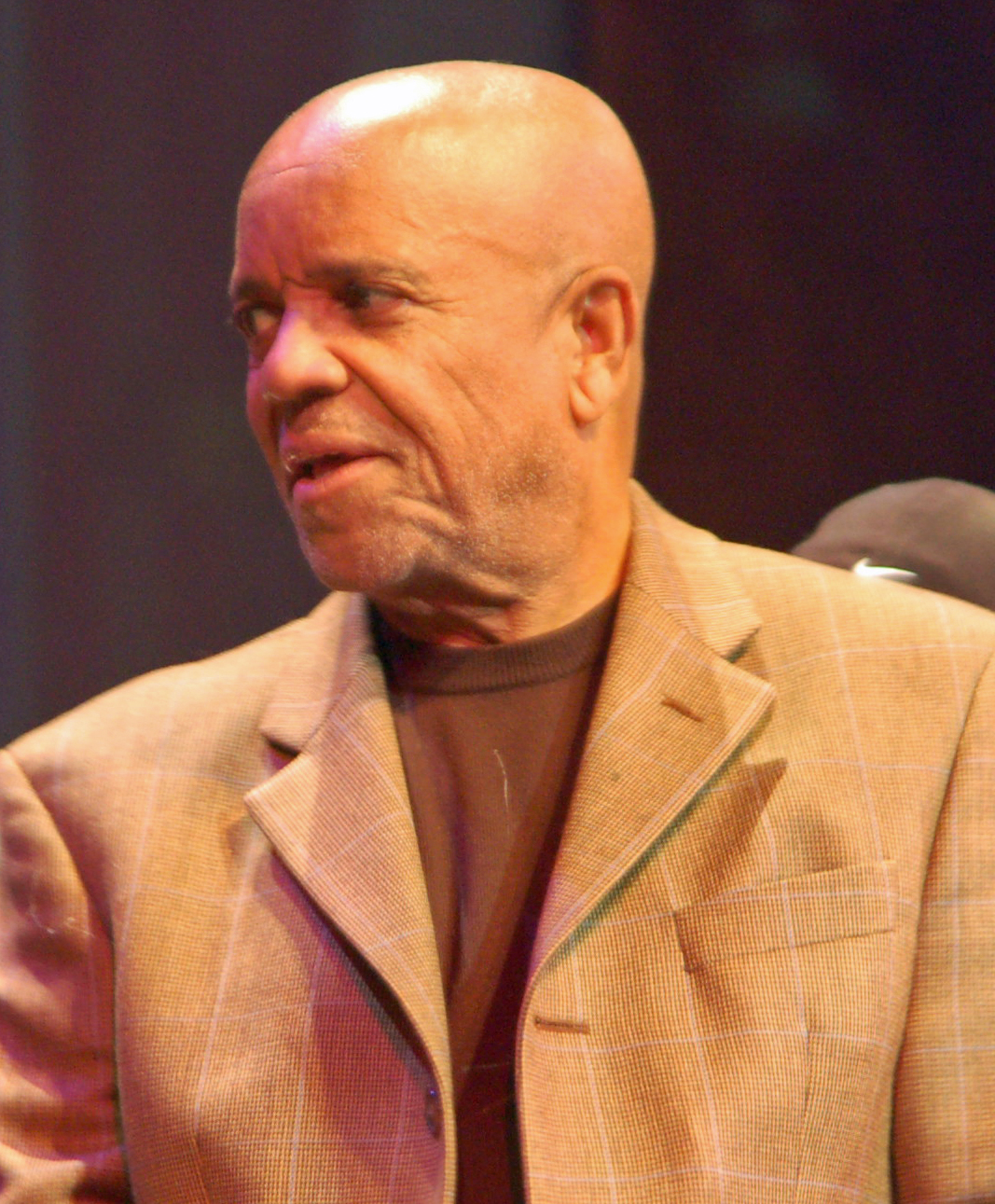
Berry Gordy Jr., 2010

In 1959, Gordy formed his first label, Tamla Records, and purchased the property that would become Motown's Hitsville U.S.A. studio. The photography studio located in the back of the property was modified into a small recording studio, which was open 22 hours a day (closing from 8 a.m. to 10 a.m. for maintenance), and the Gordys moved into the second-floor living quarters. Within seven years, Motown would occupy seven additional neighboring houses:

- Hitsville U.S.A., 1959: (ground floor) administrative office, tape library, control room, Studio A; (upper floor) Gordy living quarters (1959–1962), artists and repertoire (1962–1972)
- Jobete Publishing office, 1961: sales, billing, collections, shipping, and public relations
- Berry Gordy Jr. Enterprises, 1962: offices for Berry Gordy Jr. and his sister Esther Gordy Edwards
- Finance department, 1965: royalties and payroll
- Artist personal development, 1966: Harvey Fuqua (head of artist development and producer of stage performances), Maxine Powell (instructor in grooming, poise, and social graces for Motown artists), Maurice King (vocal coach, musical director and arranger), Cholly Atkins (house choreography), and rehearsal studios
- Two houses for administrative offices, 1966: sales and marketing, traveling and traffic, and mixing and mastering
- ITMI (International Talent Management Inc.) office, 1966: management

By the end of 1966, Motown had hired over 450 employees and had a gross income of $20 million.

=== Expansion and relocation ===
In 1967, Berry Gordy purchased what is now known as the Motown mansion, in Detroit's Boston-Edison Historic District, as his home, leaving his previous home to his sister Anna and her then-husband, Marvin Gaye (photos for the cover of his album What's Going On were taken there). In 1968, Gordy purchased the Donovan building, on the corner of Woodward Avenue and Interstate 75, and moved Motown's Detroit offices there (the Donovan building was demolished in January 2006 to provide parking spaces for Super Bowl XL). In the same year Gordy purchased Golden World Records and its recording studio became Motown's Studio B.

In 1972, Gordy relocated the Motown Records headquarters to Los Angeles. The original Hitsville studios, which had produced a long string of worldwide hits, is now the Motown Museum. The next year, he reorganized the company; it became Motown Industries, an entertainment conglomerate which would include record, movie, television and publishing divisions. Many Motown fans believed the company's heart and soul were lost following the move and that its golden age of creativity ended after its 13 years in Detroit. Esther Gordy Edwards refused to move to California and was put in charge of what was left of Motown's Detroit office in the Hitsville building.

=== Motown Museum ===
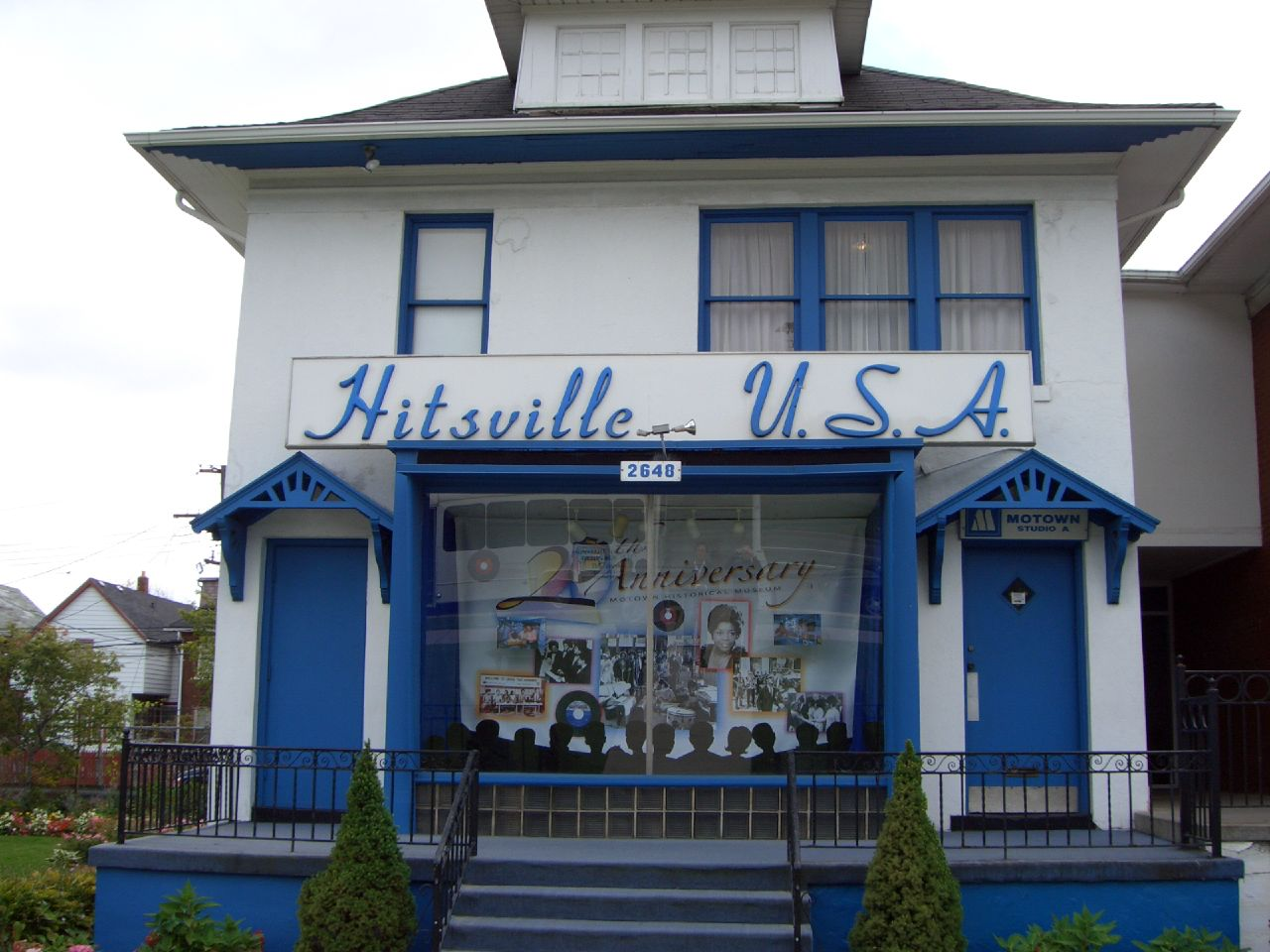
Motown Museum

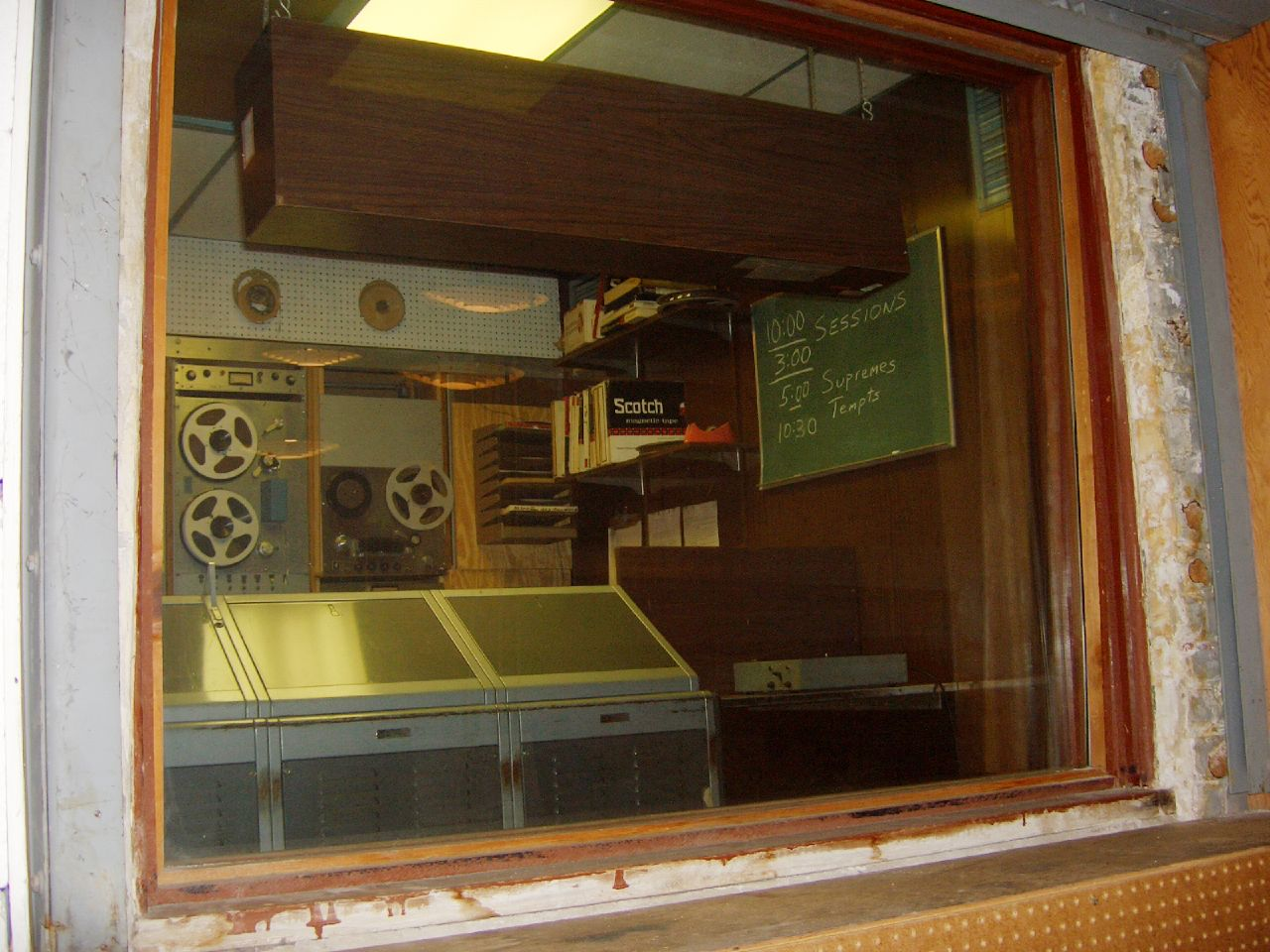
Studio A control room

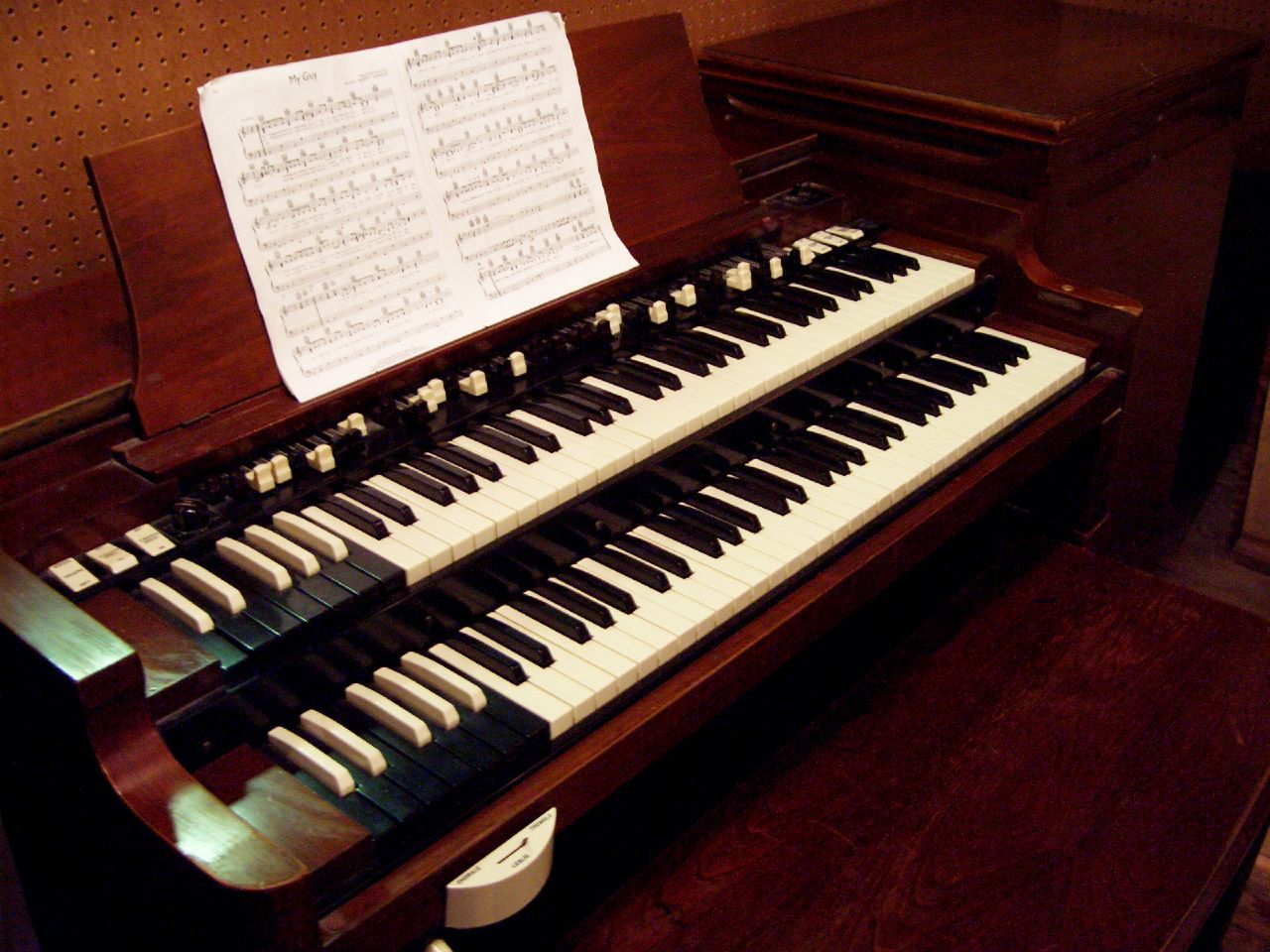
Hammond B3 organ

Edwards received several requests to visit the Hitsville building. She and her secretary put up posters and gold records. She also carefully preserved Studio A. Since 1985, the Hitsville U.S.A. building has been the site of the Motown Museum, dedicated to the legacy of the record label, its artists, and its music.

On October 23, 1988, Michael Jackson donated a black fedora and studded white right-hand glove, along with $125,000 which was the net proceeds of the first show of his Bad World Tour on October 24 in The Palace of Auburn Hills, to the Motown Museum. Edwards's granddaughter Robin Terry is involved as both the board chair and CEO.

Three of the original homes are used by the Motown Museum. Hitsville U.S.A. and the Jobete office are connected for the exhibit, which contains costumes, photos, and records from Motown's success era. Also featured are Motown's Studio A and Berry Gordy's upstairs apartment, decorated to appear as they did during the 1960s. The finance department is currently an administrative office. West Grand Boulevard was renamed "Berry Gordy, Jr. Boulevard" in the area where the Motown Historical Museum is located. The museum is one of Detroit's most popular tourist destinations.

In October 2016, the museum announced a $50-million-dollar expansion plan in order to create space for interactive exhibits and recording studios. Since the announcement, the museum has received donations from organizations like The Kresge Foundation, the AARP, and the W.K. Kellogg Foundation to help with both the expansion as well as community programming.

=== Motown's Steinway grand piano ===
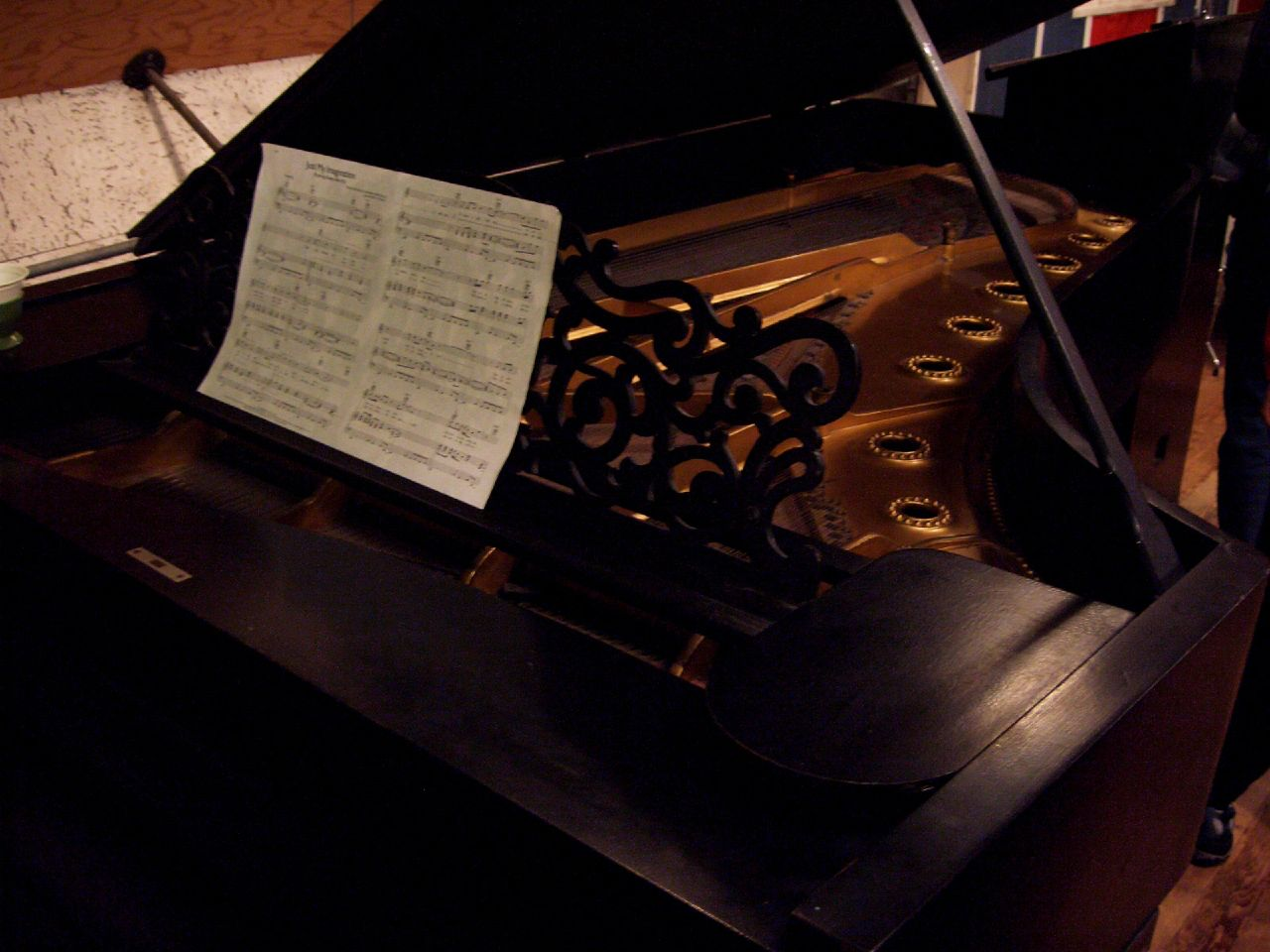
1877 Steinway & Sons Model D grand piano (exhibited on Studio A)

The Motown piano is an 1877 Steinway & Sons Model D grand piano, used by many musicians including the Funk Brothers studio band, at the Hitsville U.S.A. Studio B from 1967 to 1972. On July 24, 2011, Paul McCartney was in Detroit for a performance at Comerica Park, as part of his On the Run Tour; he visited the Motown Museum for a private guided tour. While touring Studio A, he asked to play the Motown piano, only to find that it was not in playing condition. McCartney supported a restoration by Steinway & Sons in 2012, and together with Berry Gordy played it during a charity event in September of that year.

The piano had come into Motown's possession when it bought Golden World Records in 1967. The Golden World studio then became Hitsville U.S.A. Studio B. The piano is on display in Studio A at the Motown Museum.

== Hitsville USA: The Motown Singles Collection ==
In 1992, Motown released two four-CD boxed sets compiling 104 singles released during its "Detroit era", entitled Hitsville USA: The Motown Singles Collection 1959–1971 and 76 singles from its "Los Angeles era", Hitsville USA: The Motown Singles Collection Volume 2 1972–1992.

== See also ==
- List of music museums
- Berry Gordy
- Esther Gordy Edwards
- Motown
- Music of Detroit
- The Funk Brothers
- Hitsville U.K.
