= Táta Vega =

American vocalist (born 1951)

- Born: Carmen Rosa Vega; October 7, 1951 (age 75); Jamaica, Queens, New York
- Genres: R&B, contemporary gospel
- Occupations: Singer, actress
- Instrument: Vocals
- Years active: 1969–present
- Labels: Tamla, Qwest, Prophesy
- Formerly of: Pollution; Earthquire
- Website: tatavega.com

Táta Vega (born Carmen Rosa Vega; October 7, 1951) is an American vocalist whose career spans theater, film, and a variety of musical genres.

== Early life ==
Vega was born in Jamaica, Queens, New York and raised between New York, Chicago, Texas, Panama and Puerto Rico. She is of Afro-Dominican, Puerto Rican, and Spanish descent. Her parents are Luis Alfredo De La Vega, who served in the United States Air Force, and Rosaura Maltés. As a result of her father's work, the family moved frequently. Before she was even a teenager, the family lived in Panama, Puerto Rico, San Antonio, Texas, and Colorado Springs, Colorado. Her father nicknamed her Táta, because that was the first word she uttered as a child. At the age of 17, she had her name legally changed.

== Career ==
Vega began her professional singing career in 1963. In California (1969–70) she was cast in the Los Angeles, California production of the Broadway musical, Hair. From there went on to join the group Pollution (managed by Max Baer Jr.), led by Dobie Gray (who also appeared in the Los Angeles cast of Hair). While performing in another group with vocalists Brie Brandt and Laurie Ann Bell at the Troubadour, Berry Gordy was in the audience and signed them on the spot. As Earthquire, the group released a self-titled album produced by Tom Wilson in 1972 on Motown's Natural Resources label. After the album failed to make a commercial impact, Motown dropped the group, but retained her.

After the demise of Earthquire, Vega continued to work steadily in Top 40 bands and occasionally with some former members of Pollution. After hearing her voice on a demo for Jobete, Motown's publishing wing, producer Winston Monseque and Motown executive Iris Gordy, were interested in managing her.

Vega went on to release four solo albums on the Tamla record label: Full Speed Ahead (1976), Totally Táta (1977), Try My Love (1978), and Givin' All My Love (1981).

She is probably best remembered in the UK for her 1979 release, "Get It Up for Love", from the album, Try My Love written by Ned Doheny. This was released a year later than the LP on 12" format (Motown 12 TMG 1140) as well as 45 RPM. It proved to be popular in the discos in the late 1970s in the UK.

She has had an active career as a lead backing vocalist, working with Russ Taff, Stevie Wonder, Andraé Crouch, Chaka Khan, Patti LaBelle, Michael Jackson, Ray Charles and Madonna, singing duets with Lou Rawls, Jermaine Jackson, Peter Rivera with Rare Earth and Michael Sembello. Vega is featured on the 2010 Elton John and Leon Russell CD The Union. She also worked in film, performing the voice of Shug Avery in The Color Purple; she is featured on four songs on the 1986 soundtrack album, one of which, "Miss Celie's Blues (Sister)", was nominated for an Academy Award in the Best Song category. Táta still remains uncredited for her contribution to writing some of the lyrics to 'Maybe God Is Trying To Tell You Something (Speak Lord)' for the film.

In 1985, Vega was nominated for Best Soul Female Gospel Performance at the 27th Annual Grammy Awards for her vocals on "Oh, It is Jesus", written by Andrae Crouch. In 1994, she recorded two Spanish versions of the song "Circle of Life" from Disney's The Lion King, one for Latin America ("Ciclo Sin Fin") and the other one for Spain ("El ciclo de la vida"). In 1998, she signed with Quincy Jones' Qwest Records and released a gospel album, Now I See, which was nominated for a Stellar Award.

In 2006, Vega signed with Do Rite Records, releasing a gospel album entitled This Joy on October 27, 2009.

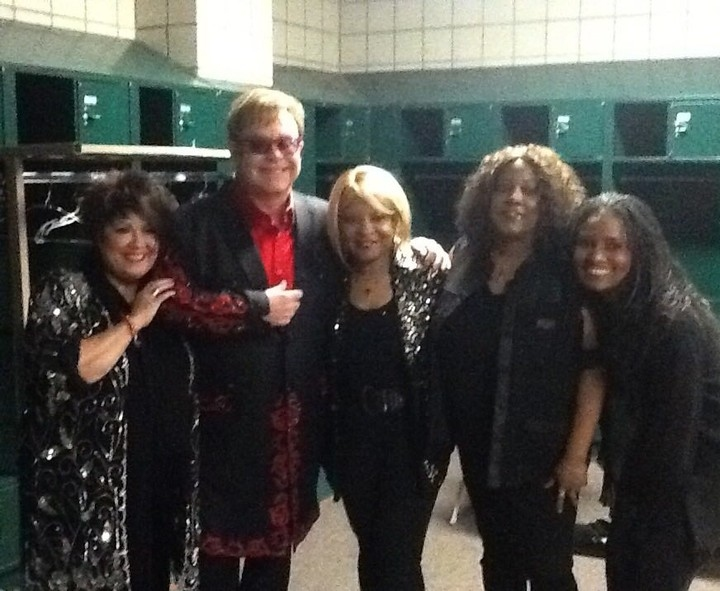
Vega with Elton John and other singers

In 2010 Tata joined Elton John's band as a full-time backing vocalist along with Rose Stone, Lisa Stone and Jean Johnson Witherspoon.

In 2011, her first two solo albums, Full Speed Ahead and Totally Táta (1977), were reissued on CD by soulmusic.com records.

On January 18, 2013, Vega, alongside Darlene Love, Merry Clayton, Lisa Fischer and Judith Hill, premiered 20 Feet from Stardom, a documentary about background singers, at Robert Redford's annual Sundance Film Festival.

On February 18, 2014, in the wake of 20 Feet from Stardom's success, her solo albums at Motown were released digitally.

Táta’s music has been sampled by Daft Punk and rappers such as Eminem, Drake and Jim Jones. Teena Marie credited both Táta and Iris Gordy for publishing one of her first songs on Táta’s debut album in 1976. Teena and Táta reconnected through her longtime manager, Lee Cadena, in the late 2000s and were in talks of forming a supergroup with Shirley Murdock shortly before Teena’s death.

In 2026, Táta Vega voiced both Grandma and Mrs. Dung Beetle in the animated film Swapped.

== Personal life ==
In 1975, while departing from a gas station in West Adams, Los Angeles, en route to a writing session with Carmen Twilie, Vega was shot in the back of the head by a young sniper on a shooting spree positioned atop a nearby building. Following the incident, Vega remarkably walked to a hospital located adjacent to the gas station.

Vega has two daughters, Angelica, Chloé and step son, Jeffrey. Vega was married to fellow musician Jeffery Vanderplate, whom she met at Andraé Crouch’s home. Vanderplate died in 2004 from small cell lung cancer.

== Discography ==
=== As group member ===
- 1971: Pollution; Pollution (Prophesy Records)
- 1972: Pollution; Pollution II (Prophesy)
- 1972: Earthquire; Earthquire (Natural Resources/Motown)

=== Solo albums ===
- 1976: Full Speed Ahead, Hollywood, Calif.: Tamla Motown, OCLC 33057917
- 1977: Totally Táta, Hollywood, Calif.: (Tamla Motown), OCLC 33057752
- 1978: Try My Love, Hollywood, Calif.: Tamla Motown, OCLC 6634273
- 1980: Givin' All My Love (Tamla Motown)
- 1988: Time's So Right
- 1998: Now I See, Burbank, CA: (Qwest Records), OCLC 40485132
- 2009: This Joy (Do Rite Records)

=== Appearances on other albums ===
- 1972: The Hot Rock OST, Quincy Jones
- 1979: Journey Through "The Secret Life of Plants", Stevie Wonder
- 1979: "Pops We Love You"...The Album, Various artists; guest vocalist
- 1985: The Color Purple (movie soundtrack)
- 1985: Mathematics, Melissa Manchester; background vocals
- 1985: Medals, Russ Taff; background vocals
- 1985: No Time to Lose, Andraé Crouch; "Right Now", "Oh, It Is Jesus"
- 1986: Frontline, Koinonia
- 1986: Someone, El DeBarge
- 1986: Without Walls, Michael Sembello
- 1986: Howard the Duck (soundtrack), Thomas Dolby; "I'm On My Way"
- 1988: Back to Avalon, Kenny Loggins
- 1988: Non Stop, Julio Iglesias; background vocals
- 1988: The Real Me, Patti Austin; background vocals
- 1990: Love Is the Reason, Engelbert Humperdinck
- 1991: Give in to the Rhythm, Arthur Baker; "Let There Be Love", "Inspiration"
- 1991: The Comfort Zone, Vanessa Williams; background vocals
- 1991: Turn It Up, Oaktown's 357; guest vocalist
- 1992: Live!, Patti LaBelle; background vocals
- 1993: My World, Ray Charles; background vocals
- 1994: The Gate To The Mind's Eye (soundtrack), Thomas Dolby; "Armageddon"
- 1994: A To a Higher Place, Tramaine Hawkins; background vocals
- 1994: El Rey León [Banda Sonora Original] [Spain], Hans Zimmer; "El ciclo de la vida"
- 1994: El Rey León [Música Original de la Película] [Latin America], Hans Zimmer; "Ciclo Sin Fin"
- 1994: Is There Anybody Out There?, Gloria Loring; background vocals
- 1994: Mercy, Andraé Crouch; background vocals
- 1994: Reach, Patti Austin; background vocals
- 1995: Sisters: The Story Goes On, various artists; "You Don't Have to Know Why"
- 1995: Am I Still in Your Heart, Chuck Negron; background vocals
- 1995: Gary Oliver Gary Oliver; background vocals
- 1986: Wildcats [Motion Picture Soundtrack]; "Love Lives Alone"
- 1997: Pray, Andraé Crouch
- 1998: The Gift of Christmas, Andraé Crouch
- 1999: Tropico/Seven the Hard Way, Pat Benatar
- 2001: If We Pray Anointed; background vocals
- 2001: Joy to the World, Chuck Negron
- 2001: Songs from the West Coast, Elton John; background vocals
- 2002: Life and Love, Philip Bailey; background vocals
- 2002: Night of Your Return, Fernando Ortega
- 2002: Real, Israel & New Breed
- 2002: The Gospel According to Jazz: Chapter 2, Kirk Whalum; "El Todopoderoso"
- 2005: Mighty Wind, Andraé Crouch; "I Was Glad"
- 2006: The Lord's Prayer: A Musical Tribute; "Give Us This Day Our Daily Bread" (with Sheila E.)
- 2006: Unbreakable Bond, GB5; "You Who Reigns"
- 2011: Low Country Blues, Gregg Allman; background vocals
- 2011: The Journey, Andraé Crouch; "Somebody Told Me About Jesus", "He Has a Plan For Me"
- 2013: Live in Los Angeles, Andraé Crouch; background vocals
- 2013: 20 Feet from Stardom soundtrack; featured vocalist and background vocals

== Filmography ==
Year	Film	Role
2013	20 Feet from Stardom	Herself
2026	Swapped	Ollie's grandmother/Mrs Dung Beetle (Voice)
