= The Dynamic Superiors (album) =

Studio album by The Dynamic Superiors
- Released: 1975
- Recorded: A&R Recording, New York City
- Genre: Soul, funk
- Label: Motown
- Producer: Ashford & Simpson

The Dynamic Superiors chronology
The Dynamic Superiors (1975)	Pure Pleasure (1975)

Professional ratings
Review scores
Source	Rating
Christgau's Record Guide	B

The Dynamic Superiors is the debut album for The Dynamic Superiors on Motown Records. Released in 1975, it contains the hits "Shoe Shoe Shine" and "Leave It Alone". After a 35-year wait, in 2010, this album was finally released on CD in a 2-for-1 set with The Superiors' second Motown album, Pure Pleasure, not by Motown, but by Universal's Soul Music.com imprint. Selected Tracks for the group's 2 album CD release. The album was arranged by Leon Pendarvis, Arthur Jenkins, Paul Riser and Richard Tee. It was written and produced by the husband-and-wife team of Nick Ashford and Valerie Simpson with Dick Ellescas credited for the cover illustration.

== Track listing ==
All tracks composed by Nick Ashford and Valerie Simpson; except where indicated

1. "Shoe Shoe Shine"
2. "Soon"
3. "Leave It Alone"
4. "Don't Send Nobody Else"
5. "Romeo"
6. "Star of my Life"
7. "Cry When You Want To"
8. "I Got Away" (Raymond Simpson)
9. "One-Nighter"
