= Vernessa Mitchell =

American singer

Vernessa Ann Mitchell (born January 1, 1959) is an American contemporary Christian and gospel recording artist whose vocal versatility has been heralded by R&B and House audiences.

== Early life ==
Mitchell was born on January 1, 1959, in Columbus, Georgia, as one of Ten siblings, whose father was a preacher. Mitchell was raised in Pasadena, California.

== Career ==
Mitchell began her career at the young age of 15, after being discovered by Berry Gordy of Motown Records. She and three other young ladies became a teen girl group called High Inergy and were signed by the label during the late 1970s. Their first album went gold and produced the hit single "You Can’t Turn Me Off (In The Middle of Turning Me On)".

The group was featured on American Bandstand, Soul Train and television shows hosted by Merv Griffin, Dinah Shore, and Mike Douglas. Billed as the next-generation Supremes, they worked with noted artists, such as Stevie Wonder, Smokey Robinson, and Michael Jackson.

Mitchell's solo debut album, “This Is My Story”, was released in 1985. The title cut on the project garnered Grammy and Dove Award nominations.

The 1987 follow-up album, "Higher Ground" became the impetus for nonprofit ministry, Higher Ground Ministries. That title single became her signature song as it gained nationwide airplay by Gospel disc jockeys. The project also featured hits such as "Rise and Shine" and "Trust in the Lord".

Her third album, “On A Mission”, which included the hits “Stand Up and Be Counted” and “Someone Loves You”, was much anticipated and built upon the success of “Higher Ground” and her critically acclaimed live performances that included presidential inaugurations and Salvation Army youth crusades.

Her 1992 release, “Destiny”, won the hearts of urban audiences throughout America and gained the attention of Dick Clark Productions and The Christian Athletic Association. “Destiny” acquired crossover success as its driving urban tone aggressively crossed religious barriers.

Hits such as “Reap” and “You Took My Life” caught the ear of renowned DJ, Junior Vasquez; and were remixed –becoming anthems within major urban clubs throughout the United States, Europe and South America. Vernessa's voice became a soaring instrument of hope and joy as her music climbed the Billboard charts. Singles such as “Took My Life” which peaked at number one on the Dance Music/Club Play charts and “Love Will Find A Way” peaking at number five, were followed by more than a dozen singles that dominated the dance charts from 1999 to 2010. Her single, “This Joy,” went triple platinum and was declared to be the most influential dance song of 1999.

Destiny acquired crossover success as its driving urban tone aggressively crossed religious barriers. Hits such as "Reap" and "You Took My Life" caught the ear of DJ Junior Vasquez; and were remixed – becoming anthems within major urban clubs throughout the United States, Europe and South America.

An evangelist, Vernessa established Higher Ground Ministries in 1985, and traveled both nationally and internationally with the goal of sharing her subscribed beliefs with thousands of pastors and congregations through word and song. She has ministered on national platforms with other leaders.

== Billboard charts ==
Although she had success as a gospel/CCM artist, Mitchell has also done well as a gospel dance diva. Her uplifting house songs have charted seven times on Billboard's Hot Dance Music/Club Play with gospel/inspirational themed dance songs "Reap (What You Sow)" (#19/1996), "This Joy" (#5/1998), "Issues" (#12/2000), "Serious" (#37/2003), "Took My Life" (#2/2004; #1 Club Play track in 2004 year-end chart) and "Accept Me"(#1/2005). Mitchell's 2006 single, "Love Will Find A Way" peaked at #5 on the Hot Dance Music/Club Play chart.

== Discography ==
=== Albums ===
- This Is My Story (1985) Top Gospel Albums #19
- Higher Ground (1988) Top Gospel Albums #32
- On a Mission (1990) Benson
- Destiny (1992) A&M
- Let Your Presence Fall (1998) Priority Sound
- Love Is The Message (2010) Continuous Cool

=== Singles ===
- "Reap (What You Sow)"
- "This Joy"
- "Higher"
- "Serious"
- "Took My Life"
- "Accept Me"
- "Trouble don't last always"
- "Love Will Find A Way"
- "Rise!"

== See also ==
- List of number-one dance hits (United States)
- List of artists who reached number one on the US Dance chart
