= "Pops We Love You"...The Album =

Compilation album by various artists
- Released: April 26, 1979
- Length: 35:02

Singles from "Pops We Love You"...The Album
- 1. "Pops, We Love You" Released: December 8, 1978

"Pops We Love You"...The Album is a 1979 compilation album by various Motown Records artists, including Marvin Gaye, Diana Ross, Stevie Wonder, Smokey Robinson, Jermaine Jackson, the Commodores, and Táta Vega. The title song is a tribute to Berry "Pops" Gordy Sr., father of Motown founder Berry Gordy. It was released on April 26, 1979.

== Track listing ==
No.	Title	Artist	Length
1.	"Pops, We Love You (Disco)"	Diana Ross, Marvin Gaye, Smokey Robinson & Stevie Wonder	5:48
2.	"God Is Love"	Marvin Gaye	3:14
3.	"I'll Keep My Light In My Window"	Diana Ross & Marvin Gaye	4:27
4.	"Mother's Son"	Smokey Robinson	5:15
5.	"This Is Your Life"	Commodores	3:12
6.	"You'll Never Rock Alone"	Jermaine Jackson & Táta Vega	3:38
7.	"Pops, We Love You"	Diana Ross, Marvin Gaye, Smokey Robinson & Stevie Wonder	3:30
8.	"Come In Heaven (Earth Is Calling)"	Tata Vega	3:39
9.	"Reach Out and Touch (Somebody's Hand)"	Diana Ross	3:00
