= You Can't Turn Me Off (In the Middle of Turning Me On) =

Single by High Inergy

from the album Turnin' On
- A-side: "You Can't Turn Me Off (In the Middle of Turning Me On)"
- B-side: "Save It for a Rainy Day"
- Released: 1977
- Recorded: 1977
- Genre: R&B
- Length: 5:09 (album version); 3:32 (7" version)
- Label: Gordy
- Songwriters: Marilyn McLeod, Pam Sawyer
- Producer: Kent Washburn

High Inergy singles chronology
"You Can't Turn Me Off (In the Middle of Turning Me On)" (1977)	"Love is All You Need" (1978)

"You Can't Turn Me Off (In the Middle of Turning Me On)" is the first single by the R&B girl group High Inergy, released in 1977. It was written by Pam Sawyer and Marilyn McLeod and was produced by Kent Washburn and arranged by Sylvester Rivers. It was from their first album, Turnin' On.

The song reached No. 2 on the Billboard Black Singles chart and No. 12 on the Hot 100 chart in December 1977.

The B-side, "Save It for a Rainy Day", was co-written by James Ingram.
