= Marilyn McLeod =

American singer-songwriter (1939-2021)

- McLeod in 1979
- Born: May 27, 1939; Detroit, Michigan, U.S.
- Died: November 24, 2021 (aged 82)
- Occupations: Songwriter; singer
- Known for: "Love Hangover"
- Relatives: Ernie Farrow (brother); Alice Coltrane (sister); Flying Lotus (grandson)

Marilyn McLeod (May 27, 1939 – November 24, 2021) was an American songwriter and occasional singer. McLeod began her career as a songwriter for Motown. Together with Pam Sawyer, she wrote the 1976 Diana Ross hit "Love Hangover".

== Early life ==
McLeod was born in Detroit, Michigan, in 1939 into a musical family – her half-brother Ernie Farrow became a noted jazz performer, and her sister Alice married John Coltrane and recorded many albums as a jazz keyboard player and harpist. Her family were acquainted with the Gordy family, partly due to Ernie Farrow's boxing activities.

== Career ==
McLeod first worked at Motown as a keypunch operator, before attracting attention in the company as a songwriter. Her first copyrighted songs for the Jobete publishing company at Motown were published in 1967, often co-written with others including William Weatherspoon before she established a friendship and writing partnership with Janie Bradford. She co-wrote Junior Walker's 1972 hit "Walk in the Night" with Johnny Bristol, and two tracks on the album Diana & Marvin, written with Mel Bolton. She also co-wrote Marvin Gaye's song "The World Is Rated X" with Bolton and others.

She moved with the company from Detroit to Los Angeles, and was teamed with lyricist Pam Sawyer. The pair co-wrote Diana Ross's 1976 hit "Love Hangover", and the High Inergy hit "You Can't Turn Me Off (in the Middle of Turning Me On)" the following year. In 1978, they co-wrote the tribute to Berry Gordy's father, "Pops, We Love You", recorded by Diana Ross, Marvin Gaye, Smokey Robinson and Stevie Wonder. Motown produced a promotional album of songs written by McLeod and Sawyer, almost all sung by McLeod and released under the band name Pure Magic.

In 1982, McLeod co-wrote Jermaine Jackson's hit with Devo, "Let Me Tickle Your Fancy", written with Sawyer, Jermaine Jackson, and Paul Jackson, Jr. McLeod left Motown in 1985, and, in the early 1990s, co-wrote several songs for Northern Soul DJ Ian Levine and his Motown revival label Motorcity Records. In 2010 she released the album I Believe In Me, a set of songs co-written with Janie Bradford.

== Personal life ==
In 2011, McLeod suffered a stroke which caused problems with her left side. A musical tribute event for her took place in March 2020, featuring Lamont Dozier, Freda Payne and Michelle Coltrane among others.

McLeod died on November 24, 2021, at the age of 82. Her grandson is the musician, producer and rapper Flying Lotus.
