= Winston Monseque =

- Born: January 1, 1939; Trinidad
- Died: November 30, 2019 (aged 80) Tacarigua, Trinidad
- Genres: R&B, funk
- Occupations: Record producer, record company president
- Years active: 1970s–1980s
- Labels: Motown, Lamar Records / Kiskidee Records in Trinidad W.I. (at Caribbean Sound basin President)

Winston Monseque was an American R&B producer and personal manager, best known for his association with Motown. He produced the top 15 US Billboard R&B chart hit single "She's Just a Groupie" by Bobby Nunn and the critically acclaimed Táta Vega album, Totally Táta. He was also one of the first producers to work with Teena Marie after she arrived at the label.

== Life and career ==
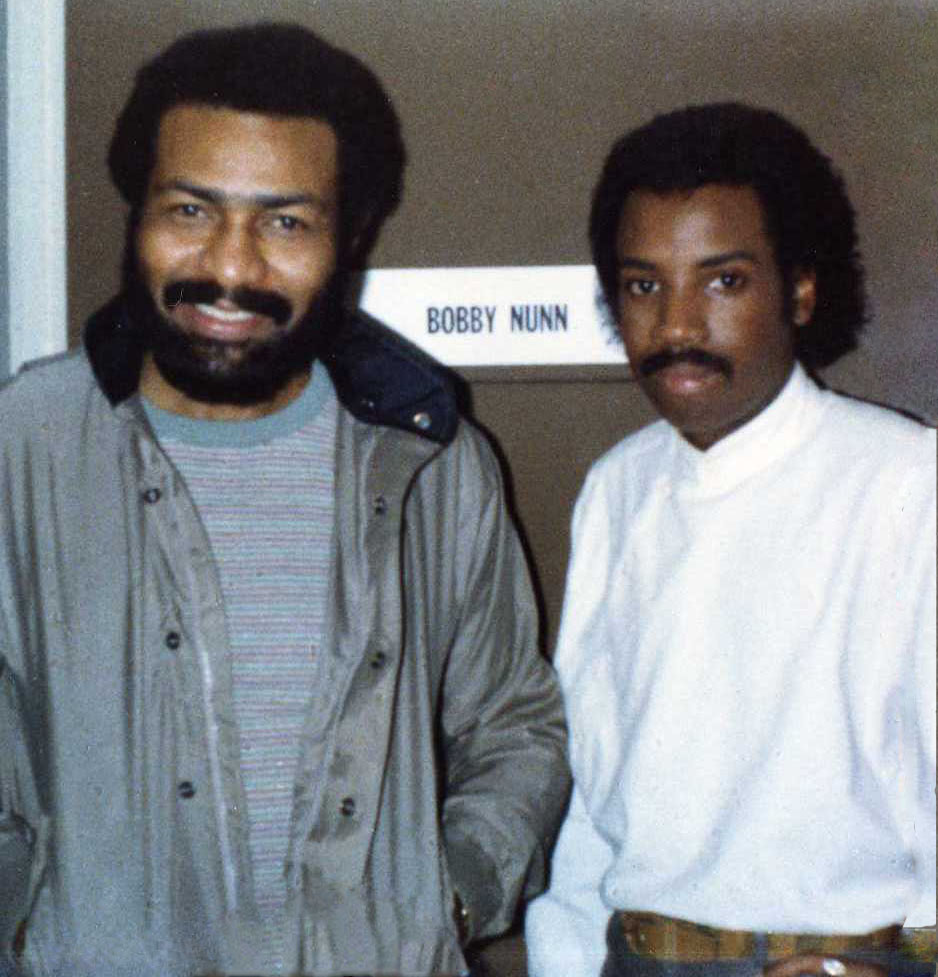
Winston Monseque and Bobby Nunn backstage at American Bandstand

Winston Carlos Monseque was a native of Trinidad.

Andrew Hamilton, in his four star review in the AllMusic Guide stated that Táta Vegas's album, "Totally Táta is a marvelous production by Winston Monseque."
