= Ned Doheny =

American singer, songwriter, and guitarist

- Born: Patrick Anson Doheny; March 26, 1948 (age 78); Malibu, California, U.S.
- Genres: Pop, rock, soft rock
- Occupation: Singer-songwriter
- Instruments: Guitar, vocals
- Years active: 1970–present
- Labels: Asylum, Arista, CBS
- Website: www.neddoheny.com
- Parents: Patrick Anson Doheny; Patricia Elizabeth "Pat" Halbriter Doheny

Patrick Anson "Ned" Doheny (born March 26, 1948) is an American singer, songwriter, and guitarist from Malibu, California, who has recorded eight albums and performed with other artists including Don Henley and Glenn Frey of the Eagles, JD Souther, Linda Ronstadt, and Jackson Browne, with whom he was once in a band. As of 2015, Doheny resides in Ventura County, California.

== Career ==
One of his earliest compositions, "On and On", was recorded by Dave Mason in 1971. Doheny, Mason, and Cass Elliott were in a trio for a time. Doheny was an early signee to David Geffen's Asylum label, which produced his first album Ned Doheny in 1972. His label mates included Jackson Browne, Joni Mitchell, David Blue, and other West Coast musicians of the day. Doheny toured multiple times with a band made up of several studio musicians.

His second album Hard Candy was released by CBS in 1976. It included the composition "A Love of Your Own", which was covered by the Average White Band. Chaka Khan also had a hit with a Doheny composition, "What Cha' Gonna Do For Me". Other Doheny songs such as "I've Got Your Number", "Get It Up For Love", and "To Prove My Love" have all charted in the US as well as the UK and Japan. His third CBS album Prone was recorded in 1977; the album has been described as a great example of the genre of yacht rock. It includes the smooth grooves, Fender Rhodes, subdued yet rhythmic drums, and relaxed vocal harmonies.

Doheny's next album, Life After Romance, was released in Japan in 1988 due to his popularity there. Between April 1990 and September 1993 he hosted a radio program called "Postcards from Hollywood" on Yokohama FM. His next studio album, Between Two Worlds, was released in 1993.

Though often categorized as a West Coast artist because of his Los Angeles roots and association with other West Coast artists, Doheny's music defies exact categorization, being variously described as pop, funk, jazz, and AOR.

In addition to original CD releases in Japan, both Hard Candy and Prone, produced by guitarist Steve Cropper, have been reissued as LP-replica CDs. All three albums are currently available as digital downloads online. In 1978, the British singer Elkie Brooks recorded "Learn to Love", written by Doheny, for her album, Shooting Star.

In 2014, the London-based reissue record label Be With Records, began an extensive vinyl-only reissue series of Doheny's albums. Hard Candy came first in September 2014 and in April 2015 they reissued the Japan-only Prone. The release was promoted via a tour of the UK and Europe.

== Discography ==
- Ned Doheny (1973)
- Hard Candy (1976)
- Prone (1979)
- Life After Romance (1988)
- Love Like Ours (1991)
- Postcards from Hollywood (live acoustic) (1991)
- Between Two Worlds (1993)
- The Darkness Beyond the Fire (2010)
- Separate Oceans (2014)
