= Pam Sawyer =

British-born American lyricist and songwriter

- Born: Pamela Joan Sawyer; 1938 (age 86–87); London, England
- Occupation: Songwriter
- Years active: Early 1960s–1980s
- Labels: Motown

Pamela Joan Sawyer (born 1938) is an English songwriter/lyricist, who started writing songs in the mid-1960s and whose credits as a co-writer at Motown included "Love Child", "If I Were Your Woman", "My Whole World Ended (The Moment You Left Me)", and "Love Hangover".

== Biography ==
She was born in London. Wanting to become a songwriter, she contacted Lew Grade in London, who was impressed and introduced her to visiting American pianist and composer Bob Mersey. She and Mersey married in 1958, and moved to New York City in 1961. After they separated, she worked as a songwriter/lyricist, initially with co-writers including Helen Miller and Mark Barkan, with whom she wrote Chuck Jackson's R&B hit "If I Didn't Love You". She then teamed up with musician and singer Lori Burton, and the pair wrote songs recorded successfully by Lulu ("Try to Understand", UK No. 25, 1965), Patti LaBelle and the Bluebelles ("All or Nothing", US No. 68, 1965), and The Young Rascals ("I Ain't Gonna Eat Out My Heart Anymore", US No. 52, 1966). Sawyer and Burton also wrote and recorded together as the Whyte Boots, with Burton as lead singer, though their record company promoted the act as a trio of female singers, none of whom actually appeared on the recordings.

In 1967, Sawyer and Burton auditioned for Holland–Dozier–Holland, who had them signed to Motown as a songwriting partnership. After a few months, Burton decided to end her relationship with Motown at the same time that Holland–Dozier–Holland left the organisation. Sawyer began working with Ivy Hunter, and then as part of the writing collective known as the Clan, with other writers including Henry Cosby and Frank Wilson. Sawyer, Cosby and Wilson co-wrote Diana Ross and the Supremes' 1968 hit "Love Child" with R. Dean Taylor and Deke Richards, which was followed up by "I'm Livin' in Shame", co-written by Sawyer with Cosby, Wilson, Taylor and Berry Gordy. The following year Sawyer co-wrote "My Whole World Ended" with James Roach, produced by Harvey Fuqua and Johnny Bristol for David Ruffin. Other hits followed at Motown, including Jr. Walker's "Got to Hold on to This Feeling", co-written with Johnny Bristol and Joe Hinton, and Sawyer encouraged the songwriting talents of singer Gloria Jones, co-writing Gladys Knight and the Pips' 1970 No. 1 R&B hit, "If I Were Your Woman" with Jones and Clay McMurray produced the song and Jr. Walker's "Take Me Girl, I'm Ready" with Jones and Johnny Bristol. She also wrote with Michael Masser, sharing writing credits on "Last Time I Saw Him", a hit for both Diana Ross and country singer Dottie West, and "My Mistake (Was to Love You)", recorded as a duet by Ross and Marvin Gaye. Writing with Marilyn McLeod, she wrote Ross's number one hit in 1976, "Love Hangover", and the pair also wrote "Pops, We Love You", the tribute to Berry Gordy's father recorded by Ross, Gaye, Stevie Wonder and Smokey Robinson.

Sawyer left Motown in the early 1980s, and set up her own companies, Pam Sawyer Productions and Barley Lane Music. She lives in Florida.

In 2023, Sawyer was inducted into the Women Songwriter's Hall of Fame.

== Selected songwriting credits ==
Song	Co-Writer(s)	Performer(s)
"If I Were Your Woman"	Gloria Jones; Clay McMurray	Gladys Knight & the Pips; Gloria Jones; Bettye LaVette; Stephanie Mills; Alicia Keys
"I Thought It Took a Little Time (But Today I Fell in Love)"	Michael Masser	Diana Ross
"It's So Hard for Me to Say Goodbye"	Frank Wilson	Eddie Kendricks; The Supremes
"Let Me Tickle Your Fancy"	Jermaine Jackson; Paul M. Jackson; Marilyn McLeod	Jermaine Jackson
"Love Child"	Deke Richards; R. Dean Taylor; Frank Wilson	Diana Ross and the Supremes; Booker T. & the M.G.'s; Sweet Sensation
"Love Hangover"	Marilyn McLeod	The Fifth Dimension; Diana Ross; Associates; Jody Watley; Players Association; Syleena Johnson
"My Mistake (Was to Love You)"	Gloria Jones	Marvin Gaye and Diana Ross
"My Whole World Ended (The Moment You Left Me)"	Johnny Bristol; Harvey Fuqua; Jimmy Roach	David Ruffin
"Touch"	Frank Wilson	The Supremes; Jackson 5
"You Can't Turn Me Off (In the Middle of Turning Me On)"	Marilyn McLeod	High Inergy
