= High Inergy =

American R&B and soul girl group

- Michelle Martin, Linda Howard, Barbara Mitchell (1979)

Background information
- Origin: Pasadena, California, U.S.
- Genres: Pop, R&B, soul, disco
- Years active: 1977–1983
- Labels: Gordy
- Past members: Linda Howard; Michelle Martin; Barbara Mitchell; Vernessa Mitchell (1977-1978)

High Inergy was an American R&B and soul girl group who found fame on Motown Records in the late 1970s. They are best known for the hit song, "You Can't Turn Me Off (In the Middle of Turning Me On)".

== History ==
High Inergy started in 1976 when the four founding singers were discovered by Gwen Gordy Fuqua during a Bicentennial show in Pasadena, California. The members of the group included lead singer Vernessa Mitchell, her sister Barbara Mitchell, Linda Howard and Michelle Martin (or Rumph). The Mitchell sisters were singers, while the remaining members were known primarily for their dancing.

Fashioned after Martha and the Vandellas and the Supremes, the group was signed to Motown's Gordy subsidiary in 1977. They quickly found success with the R&B/pop hit, "You Can't Turn Me Off (In the Middle of Turning Me On)," which reached R&B number 2 and U.S. number 12.

The group became a trio when Vernessa left after the second album to pursue a career in gospel music. Barbara Mitchell replaced her sister as lead singer. Michelle Martin was replaced by dancer Pat Douglas during rehearsals for Motown 25 in 1983, and made one more appearance with the group later on Soul Train. Shortly after this broadcast Barbara Mitchell went solo and Motown retired the group.

The group would score a total of nine R&B hits before disbanding for solo careers in 1984.

Group member Linda Howard died on December 9, 2012.

== Collaborations ==
On their 1980 album, Hold On, the group collaborated with labelmates Switch on the track "Hold On to My Love." The song features Switch member Bobby DeBarge as the male lead vocalist. DeBarge also produced and co-wrote the song.

Smokey Robinson performed two duets with Barbara Mitchell on Groove Patrol, High Inergy's last album, which was released in 1983.

== Discography ==
=== Albums ===
Year	Album	Cat. ref.	R&B	Pop
1977	Turnin' On	Gordy G6-978 S1	6	28
1978	Steppin' Out	Gordy G7-982 R1	46	42
1979	Shoulda Gone Dancin'	Gordy G7-987 R1	72	147
1979	Frenzy	Gordy G7-989 R1	—	205
1980	Hold On	Gordy G8-996 M1	70	208
1981	High Inergy	Gordy G8-1005 M1	—	203
1982	So Right	Gordy 6006GL	—	—
1983	Groove Patrol	Gordy 6041GL	62	206

=== Singles ===
Year	Single	Cat. ref.	R&B	Pop	Dance
1977	"You Can't Turn Me Off (In the Middle of Turning Me On)" b/w "Save It for a Rainy Day"	Gordy G 7155F	2	12	-
1978	"Love Is All You Need" b/w "Some Kinda Magic"	Gordy G 7157F	20	89	-
1978	"We Are the Future" b/w "High School"	Gordy G 7160F	77	-	-
1978	"Lovin' Fever" b/w "Beware"	Gordy G 7161F	51	-	-
1979	"Shoulda Gone Dancin'" b/w "Peaceland"	Gordy G 7166F	50	101	35
1980	"Make Me Yours" b/w "I Love Makin' Love (To the Music)"	Gordy G 7187F	68	-	-
1981	"Goin' Through the Motions"	Gordy	73	—	-
1982	"First Impressions" b/w "Could This Be Love"	Gordy 1613GF	50	-	-
1983	"He's a Pretender" b/w "Don't Let Up on the Groove"	Gordy 1662GF	62	82	25
