= Just Another Lonely Night =

1969 song by William "Mickey" Stevenson and Ivy Jo Hunter

Song by The Temptations

from the album The Temptin' Temptations
- Released: November 1, 1965
- Recorded: Hitsville USA (Studio A); 1965
- Genre: Soul
- Length: 3:03
- Label: Gordy
- Songwriter(s): William "Mickey" Stevenson; Ivy Jo Hunter
- Producer(s): William "Mickey" Stevenson; Ivy Jo Hunter

"Just Another Lonely Night"

Song by Four Tops

from the album Fourever
- Released: September 25, 2001
- Recorded: Hitsville USA (Studio A); June 10, 1965, July 4, 1965 and July 13, 1967
- Genre: Soul
- Length: 2:29
- Label: Motown
- Songwriter(s): William "Mickey" Stevenson; Ivy Jo Hunter
- Producer(s): William "Mickey" Stevenson; Ivy Jo Hunter

"Just Another Lonely Night"

Single by The Fantastic Four

from the album How Sweet He Is
- B-side: "Don't Care Why You Want Me (Long as You Want Me)"
- Released: September 23, 1969
- Recorded: 1969; Hitsville USA (Studio A); Golden World (Studio B) (Detroit, Michigan)
- Genre: Soul, R&B
- Length: 2:54
- Label: Soul; S35065
- Songwriter(s): William "Mickey" Stevenson; Ivy Jo Hunter
- Producer(s): Clay McMurray

The Fantastic Four singles chronology
"I Feel Like I'm Falling in Love Again" (1969)	"Just Another Lonely Night" (1969)	"On the Brighter Side of a Blue World" (1970)

"Just Another Lonely Night" is a 1965 song co-written and co-produced by William "Mickey" Stevenson and Ivy Jo Hunter. It was recorded by four Motown acts: The Temptations, Brenda Holloway, The Four Tops, and The Fantastic Four.

The Temptations first recorded in 1965 for the Gordy (Motown) label. Their version would be released as an album track on The Temptin' Temptations. It features a lead by Paul Williams, one of the group's original lead singers who by then had been eclipsed by David Ruffin and Eddie Kendricks as lead even on the group's album tracks and A B-sides. Although Williams still recorded several leads, they were often overlooked for release by the label. Williams and the other Temptations constantly complained about not allowing Williams more leads on album tracks, and singles, but Motown paid them no heed. The Andantes were added for additional backing vocals on the track.

Brenda Holloway later covered the song in 1966, and the Four Tops in 1967; the Andantes backed both recordings. In the Tops' case, lead singer Levi Stubbs recorded his lead soon after the Tempts completed their version, and the group (with the Andantes) dubbed backing vocals over the Tempts/Andantes original instrumental and vocal backing track. Joining the Andantes as backing vocals on Holloway's version were the Originals, who were signed to label earlier that year.

Detroit-based R&B group The Fantastic Four covered it as a 1969 single on Motown's Soul label, with the Andantes brought in once again to provide additional backing vocals. The group was one of the acts (along with Edwin Starr, J. J. Barnes, etc.) whose contracts were bought by Motown when they purchased both the Ric-Tic and Golden World labels. At Ric-Tic, the group was the label's most successful act, outselling Starr and the other acts signed. However, success would not follow them to Motown and the single failed to chart. "Just Another Lonely Night" was the second track on The Fantastic Four's cancelled and unreleased Motown album How Sweet He Is.

== Personnel ==
=== Temptations version ===
- Lead vocals by Paul Williams
- Background vocals by Eddie Kendricks, Melvin Franklin, Paul Williams, David Ruffin, Otis Williams, and The Andantes (Jackie Hicks, Marlene Barrow, and Louvain Demps)
- Instrumentation by The Funk Brothers

=== Brenda Holloway version ===
- Lead vocals by Brenda Holloway
- Background vocals by The Originals (Hank Dixon, C. P. Spencer, Walter Gaines, and Freddie Gorman) and The Andantes (Jackie Hicks, Marlene Barrow, and Louvain Demps)
- Instrumentation by The Funk Brothers

=== Four Tops version ===
- Lead vocals by Levi Stubbs
- Background Vocals by Renaldo "Obie" Benson, Lawrence Payton, and Abdul "Duke" Fakir, The Temptations (Eddie Kendricks, Melvin Franklin, Paul Williams, David Ruffin, and Otis Williams) and The Andantes (Jackie Hicks, Marlene Barrow, and Louvain Demps)
- Instrumentation by The Funk Brothers

=== Fantastic Four version ===
- Lead vocals by James Epps
- Background Vocals by Ralph Pruitt, Joseph Pruitt, Wallace "Toby" Childs, and The Andantes (Jackie Hicks, Marlene Barrow, and Louvain Demps)
- Instrumentation by The Funk Brothers
- Arranged by Paul Riser and Wade Marcus
