= A Cellarful of Motown! =

Compilation album series

A Cellarful of Motown! is a series of compilation albums of Motown rarities, containing versions of known songs by alternative artists, as well as demos of songs that were not released at the time, but had been shelved for various reasons.

Compiled by Paul Nixon, the series ran for four volumes before being cancelled by Universal Records. Some of them had failed to pass the selections by Motown executives, in other cases Motown's owner Berry Gordy had his personal reasons to withhold releases. Four examples out of many:

- "Danger, Heartbreak Dead Ahead" was a hit for the Marvelettes, but appears in a version by the Contours.
- Likewise, Smokey Robinson's "My Heart", once a minor hit for Caroline Crawford, is in this compilation performed by Tammi Terrell.
- From Patrice Holloway only one single was released by Motown; two demos she made for the company appear in this compilation.
- The Spinners' original song "Too Late I Learned" was recorded but never released, not as a single nor as an album track.

The series was revived for a fifth volume in September 2020, released by Universal subsidiary label Caroline Records.

== Volume 1 ==
A Cellarful of Motown! Volume 1

Compilation album by various artists
- Released: July 30, 2002
- Recorded: July 2, 1962 – December 1, 1969
- Genres: Soul; funk
- Label: Motown

Various artists chronology
A Cellarful of Motown! Volume 1 (2002)	Volume 2 (2005)

Professional ratings
Review scores
Source	Rating
AllMusic	5/5 stars

Source: Classic Motown, AllMusic

=== Disc one ===
No.	Title	Performing artist(s)	Length
1.	"Baby a Go-Go"	Barbara McNair	2:49
2.	"All Your Love"	Brenda Holloway	3:24
3.	"He Was Really Sayin' Somethin'"	Earl Van Dyke	2:33
4.	"Danger, Heartbreak Dead Ahead"	The Contours	2:38
5.	"Do I Love You (Indeed I Do)"	Chris Clark	2:30
6.	"Baby Hit and Run"	The Contours	3:02
7.	"How Can I"	Brenda Holloway	2:40
8.	"I Like Everything About You"	The Contours	2:54
9.	"All I Do Is Think About You"	Tammi Terrell	2:59
10.	"Lucky, Lucky Me"	Jimmy Ruffin	2:53
11.	"On the Avenue (In the Neighborhood)"	Jimmy Ruffin	2:27
12.	"My World Is Crumbling"	Brenda Holloway	3:09
13.	"Poor Little Rich Girl"	The Marvelettes	2:47
14.	"Save My Love for a Rainy Day"	Marv Johnson	2:54
15.	"Tell Me It's Just a Rumour Baby" (Instrumental)	The Funk Brothers	3:24
16.	"If You Ever Get Your Hands on Love"	Gladys Knight & the Pips	2:55
17.	"Are You Sure Love Is the Name of the Game"	Stevie Wonder	2:38
18.	"Until You Came Along"	Caroline Crawford	2:25
19.	"Before It's Over"	Sammy Ward	2:54
20.	"Long Gone Lover"	The Velvelettes	2:32

=== Disc two ===
No.	Title	Performing artist(s)	Length
1.	"My Sugar Baby"	Frank Wilson	2:41
2.	"Here Are the Pieces of Broken Heart" (Single reference mix)	Gladys Knight & the Pips	2:49
3.	"There's a Definite Change in You"	The Temptations	2:45
4.	"Who You Gonna Run To"	Brenda Holloway	3:13
5.	"(It's Easy to Fall in Love) With a Guy Like You"	Martha and the Vandellas	2:16
6.	"Touch of Venus"	Patrice Holloway	2:49
7.	"I Wish I Liked You (As Much as I Love You)"	Marvin Gaye	2:43
8.	"Trapped in a Love Affair"	Brenda Holloway	2:19
9.	"I Know How to Love Her"	Jimmy Ruffin	2:44
10.	"Riding High on Love"	Junior Walker & the All Stars	2:37
11.	"Why When Love Is Gone" (Single reference mix)	The Originals	2:52
12.	"If This World Were Mine" (Single reference mix)	The Fantastic Four	2:54
13.	"Don't Let Me Down"	Kim Weston	3:02
14.	"Don't Put Off Till Tomorrow What You Can Do Today" (Extended single mix)	The Monitors	3:47
15.	"(Tell Me) Ain't It the Truth"	J. J. Barnes	2:49
16.	"You Made Me Feel Like (Everything Is Alright)"	Syreeta	2:39
17.	"Weakspot in My Heart"	The Isley Brothers	2:41
18.	"Don't Make Me Live Without Your Love"	The Lewis Sisters	2:59
19.	"It Must Be Love Baby"	Chuck Jackson and Yvonne Fair	2:41
20.	"Ain't No Place Like Motown"	The Velvelettes	3:19

== Volume 2 ==
A Cellarful of Motown! Volume 2

Compilation album by various artists
- Released: July 4, 2005
- Recorded: September 10, 1964 – January 23, 1970
- Genres: Soul; funk
- Label: Motown

Various artists chronology
Volume 1 (2002)	A Cellarful of Motown! Volume 2 (2005)	Volume 3 (2007)

Professional ratings
Review scores
Source	Rating
AllMusic	4.5/5 stars

Source: Discogs, AllMusic

=== Disc one ===
No.	Title	Performing artist(s)	Length
1.	"All Day All Night"	Earl Van Dyke	2:32
2.	"Take Me in Your Arms (Rock Me a Little While)"	Eddie Holland	2:46
3.	"Everyday I'll Love You More Than Yesterday"	Gladys Knight & the Pips	2:24
4.	"Everytime I See You, I Go Wild!"	J. J. Barnes	2:58
5.	"My Two Arms – You = Tears"	The Elgins	2:30
6.	"Keep Stepping (Never Look Back)"	Caroline Crawford	2:24
7.	"Take My Hand"	The Dalton Boys	2:50
8.	"Boy from Crosstown" (Alternative mix)	The Marvelettes	2:44
9.	"I Can't Get Along Without You"	The Monitors	2:42
10.	"I Gave Up Quality for Quantity"	Stevie Wonder	2:51
11.	"Start With Joy in the Morning"	Martha and the Vandellas	3:10
12.	"What Am I Gonna Do Without You"	The Detroit Spinners	2:33
13.	"After the Rain"	Kim Weston	2:11
14.	"Let's Talk It Over"	Marv Johnson	2:22
15.	"Choo Choo Train"	Little Lisa	2:20
16.	"I've Got to Get Away"	Tommy Good	2:41
17.	"Show Girl"	The Vows	3:10
18.	"In the Dark"	The Creations	2:33
19.	"Love, Trouble, Heartache and Misery"	Hattie Littles	2:31
20.	"Positively Absolutely Right"	The Temptations	2:00
21.	"Woman Just Won't Do Right"	Shorty Long	3:20
22.	"Sound Clip"	Various	3:59

=== Disc two ===
No.	Title	Performing artist(s)	Length
1.	"Honey Bee (Keep Stinging Me)" (Out on the Floor mix)	Diana Ross and the Supremes	2:30
2.	"Everybody Needs Somebody (I Need You)"	J. J. Barnes	2:39
3.	"Hoping the Pause Is Helping the Cause"	Smokey Robinson & the Miracles	3:10
4.	"Baby Baby I'm in Love Again"	Debbie Dean	2:28
5.	"I Can't Go on Sharing Your Love"	The Isley Brothers	3:08
6.	"Breakaway"	The Lewis Sisters	2:31
7.	"It's a Lonely World Without Your Love"	Four Tops	2:46
8.	"Midnight Johnny"	Connie Haines	2:58
9.	"Take Him Back If It Makes You Happy"	The Contours	2:30
10.	"Sweet Lovin'"	Chris Clark	2:51
11.	"My Springtime"	Terry Johnson	2:31
12.	"Lone, Lonely Town"	Martha and the Vandellas	2:50
13.	"Nothing in This World Like My Baby"	The Originals	2:53
14.	"Words"	The Monitors	2:42
15.	"You've Got to Pay the Price"	The Supremes	3:27
16.	"Where Is the Love"	Rita Wright	2:54
17.	"Rescue Me"	Blinky	2:40
18.	"Those DJ Shows"	Patrice Holloway	2:33
19.	"My Heart"	Tammi Terrell	2:56
20.	"I Hope You Have Better Luck Than I Did"	The Marvelettes	2:51
21.	"Crying Game"	Brenda Holloway	2:16
22.	"Sound Clip"	Various	3:28

== Volume 3 ==
A Cellarful of Motown! Volume 3

Compilation album by various artists
- Released: October 15, 2007
- Genres: Soul; funk
- Label: Motown

Various artists chronology
Volume 2 (2005)	A Cellarful of Motown! Volume 3 (2007)	Volume 4 (2010)

Source: Discogs, AllMusic

=== Disc one ===
No.	Title	Performing artist(s)	Length
1.	"You're Walking Out with My Heart"	Brenda Holloway	2:59
2.	"This Love Will Never Die"	The Miracles	2:19
3.	"Get Ready"	San Remo Golden Strings	2:48
4.	"Love Is Good"	The Marvelettes	2:44
5.	"Jealousy Is Creeping Up on Me"	The Contours	2:46
6.	"Easier Said Than Done"	Dennis Edwards	2:55
7.	"At the Go Go"	Stevie Wonder	3:33
8.	"Memories of Her Love Keep Haunting Me"	The Spinners	2:30
9.	"I'm in Love Again"	Shorty Long	2:21
10.	"I Can't Let Him Go"	Yvonne Fair	2:52
11.	"Come On and See Me"	Chris Clark	2:40
12.	"Never Give You Up"	Blinky & Edwin Starr	3:02
13.	"Just Too Much to Hope For"	The Monitors	2:39
14.	"(Loving You) Is Hurting Me"	The Fantastic Four	3:33
15.	"SOS Girl in Distress"	Marv Johnson	3:13
16.	"Thief of Love"	Oma Page	2:03
17.	"Too Young, Too Long"	Caroline Crawford	2:39
18.	"You Stay on My Mind"	Clarence Paul	2:24
19.	"Come Back My Love"	The Temptations	2:49
20.	"A Chance with You"	Marvin Gaye	2:17
21.	"Watch Your Step"	Mike Varo	3:21
22.	"The Boy from Crosstown"	The Marvelettes	3:02

=== Disc two ===
No.	Title	Performing artist(s)	Length
1.	"We'll Keep On Rolling"	Brenda Holloway	2:19
2.	"I Can't Help Loving You Baby"	The Contours	2:46
3.	"I'm Here Now That You Need Me"	J. J. Barnes	2:45
4.	"Judge's Daughter"	The Originals	2:33
5.	"Something About You"	Debbie Dean	2:45
6.	"Soldier of Love"	Four Tops	3:30
7.	"I'm Gonna Get You"	Gladys Knight & the Pips	2:08
8.	"Don't Stop Loving Me"	Ivy Jo Hunter	2:48
9.	"Sweet Sweet Love"	The Lollipops	2:49
10.	"I'm Doing the Best I Can"	Junior Walker & the All Stars	2:56
11.	"Cindy"	Bobby Taylor	3:55
12.	"Little Girls Grow Up"	The Marvelettes	2:43
13.	"Too Late I Learned"	The Spinners	2:37
14.	"Beware of a Stranger"	Rita Wright	2:40
15.	"You Took Me This Far (Take Me All the Way)"	Edwin Starr	2:47
16.	"Can I Get a Witness"	Blinky	2:13
17.	"(There's Always Room For) Love in a Movie"	Bob Kayli	3:05
18.	"Farewell Is a Lonely Sound"	Paul Peterson	2:42
19.	"You've Made Me So Very Happy"	Little Miss Soul	3:06
20.	"Honey Hut"	Shorty Long	2:57
21.	"Honey Boy"	Little Lisa	2:43
22.	"This Is Goodbye"	The Headliners	2:38
23.	"Going to a Go-Go"	Brenda Holloway and The Supremes	2:52

== Volume 4 ==
A Cellarful of Motown! Volume 4

Compilation album by various artists
- Released: September 7, 2010
- Recorded: February 24, 1971 – September 21, 1971
- Genres: Soul; funk
- Label: Motown

Various artists chronology
Volume 3 (2007)	A Cellarful of Motown! Volume 4 (2010)

Professional ratings
Review scores
Source	Rating
AllMusic	4/5 stars

Source: Soulsource, AllMusic

=== Disc one ===
No.	Title	Performing artist(s)	Length
1.	"Kidnapped"	The Blackberries	2:46
2.	"Keep on Tryin' ('Til You Find Love)"	The Fantastic Four	3:17
3.	"Your Kiss Kiss"	Marvin Gaye, Oma Heard	2:24
4.	"My Baby Moves Me"	Brenda Holloway	2:33
5.	"Cool Cool Baby"	Junior Walker & the All Stars	3:01
6.	"The Girl I've Chosen to Be My Bride"	Joe Stubbs	2:55
7.	"You Didn't Show Girl"	The Temptations	2:53
8.	"My Baby Changes Like the Weather"	The Vows	2:40
9.	"Doctor of Love"	The Monitors	2:57
10.	"All I Need Is a Chance"	Robert Dobyne	2:18
11.	"The Day You Take One (You Have to Take the Other)"	Gladys Knight & the Pips	2:41
12.	"Ain't Gonna Tell You"	Frank Wilson	2:08
13.	"Dancing U.S.A."	The Contours	2:25
14.	"That's the Way I See Him"	The Marvelettes	2:44
15.	"Have a Little Patience (And Wait)"	Mary Wells	2:47
16.	"Three Time Loser"	Marvin Gaye	2:39
17.	"Lead Me and Guide Me"	Holland & Dozier	2:35
18.	"It's Company Time"	The Versatones	2:58
19.	"Twin Brother"	Eddie Holland	2:51
20.	"Think of the Times"	Caroline Crawford	2:35
21.	"You're What's Happening Baby"	Four Tops	3:11
22.	"I'll Turn to Stone"	Dennis Edwards	2:24
23.	"I Need You More Now Than Ever"	Paul Williams	3:40
24.	"Daddy, Cool"	Oma Heard	2:49
25.	"The Real You"	Barbara McNair	3:06

=== Disc two ===
No.	Title	Performing artist(s)	Length
1.	"Miss Lonely Heart"	Martha and the Vandellas	2:26
2.	"The House That Jack Built"	J. J. Barnes	2:36
3.	"The Philly Dog"	Earl Van Dyke & the Soul Brothers	3:02
4.	"Whole Lot of Shakin' in My Heart (Since I Met You)"	The Utopians	3:08
5.	"Only a Lonely Man Would Know"	Ivy Jo Hunter	3:00
6.	"It's Gonna Be Always"	Blinky	2:59
7.	"Somebody's Waiting for Me"	The Contours	2:51
8.	"A Bird in the Hand (Is Worth Two in the Bush)"	Gladys Knight & the Pips	3:04
9.	"Don't Let Me Be Lonely"	Tammi Terrell	3:01
10.	"Why Don't You Come Home"	Stevie Wonder	2:56
11.	"You Can Do It"	The Miracles	2:31
12.	"You Gave Me Love to Live For"	Debbie Dean	2:27
13.	"Head over Heels in Love with You Baby"	The Spinners	2:31
14.	"I'd Cry"	Chuck Jackson	2:57
15.	"In the Summer"	The Lollipops	3:14
16.	"Just Let Me Thank You for Loving Me"	The Originals	3:23
17.	"I Feel Like I'm Falling in Love Again"	Dennis Edwards	2:58
18.	"Sock It Too 'Um"	Junior Walker & the All Stars	2:56
19.	"Take Him Back If It Makes You Happy"	The Fantastic Four	2:34
20.	"Born to Be Bad"	Edwin Starr	3:10
21.	"She's All I Need (In This World)"	Marv Johnson	3:00
22.	"Mobile Lil the Dancing Witch"	Shorty Long	2:33
23.	"Hey Girl, Come on Do the Pearl"	The Agents	2:56
24.	"In the Cool of the Night"	David Ruffin	3:03
25.	"Little Miss Loser"	Brenda Holloway	2:29

== Volume 5 ==
Source: Allmusic

=== Disc one ===
No.	Title	Performing artist(s)	Length
1.	"A Toast to the Lady"	Frank Wilson	2:45
2.	"Don't Let Me Lose This Dream"	Martha & the Vandellas	2:32
3.	"I Gotta Find a Way (To Get You Back)"	The Temptations	2:49
4.	"True Fine Boy"	The Funk Brothers	2:28
5.	"Nothing But a Fool"	Gladys Knight & the Pips	3:00
6.	"There's No Love Left"	Eddie Holland	3:10
7.	"Whisper You Love Me Boy"	The Lewis Sisters	2:26
8.	"I Don't Want You Anymore"	Chris Clark	2:17
9.	"That'll Be the Day"	Marvin Gaye / Kim Weston	2:53
10.	"Without Love You Lose a Good Feelin'"	Brenda Holloway	3:27
11.	"Determination"	Ivy Jo Hunter	2:56
12.	"A World Without You"	Barbara McNair	2:32
13.	"What in the World's Going On"	R. Dean Taylor	3:07
14.	"Hold Me Oh My Darling"	Anne Bogan	2:37
15.	"It Feels Like I'm Falling in Love Again"	Jimmy Ruffin	3:19
16.	"It's All Over [Band Track]"	The Isley Brothers	2:45
17.	"I Don't Know What You Got"	Edwin Starr	2:19
18.	"Sweet Talkin' Guy"	The Marvelettes	3:14
19.	"I Want a Love I Can See"	The Underdogs	3:20
20.	"Don't Be Too Long"	Anita Knorl	2:30
21.	"All I Have Left Are Memories"	Sammy Turner	3:00

=== Disc two ===
No.	Title	Performing artist(s)	Length
1.	"Only You"	Brian Holland	2:40
2.	"There Are Things"	Anne Bogan	2:45
3.	"Then"	The Temptations	2:47
4.	"The Truth Does Hurt"	The Funk Brothers	3:19
5.	"All I Want Is a Little Bit of Love"	Barbara McNair	2:42
6.	"A Miracle Happened"	Johnny Bristol	2:35
7.	"In Your Heart"	Patrice Holloway	2:49
8.	"I Found My Love in You"	Tommy Good	2:51
9.	"When Someone's Good to You"	Oma Page	2:39
10.	"Tomorrow's Child"	Terry Johnson	3:57
11.	"Just Too Much to Hope For"	Marvin Gaye / Kim Weston	2:54
12.	"I Had a Woman"	Dalton Boys	2:52
13.	"It"	Little Lisa	3:07
14.	"(Come Round Here) I'm the One You Need"	Hearts of Stone	2:34
15.	"I Love the Way He Loves Me"	Martha & the Vandellas	2:22
16.	"Walk Down That Road"	Billy Eckstine	3:00
17.	"You Got a Little of Everything"	Brenda Holloway	2:36
18.	"Until You Love Someone"	Sammy Turner	2:28
19.	"You'll Never Cherish a Love So True (Til You Lose It)"	Blinky	3:19
20.	"While the City Sleeps"	The Spinners	2:49
21.	"I Wish I Liked You (As Much as I Love You)"	Connie Haines	2:45
22.	"Windmills of Your Mind"	Chuck Jackson	3:51
