= Baby, I'm for Real =

Single by The Originals

from the album Green Grow the Lilacs
- B-side: "Moment of Truth"
- Released: August 12, 1969
- Recorded: 1969, Hitsville USA (Studio A), Detroit, Michigan
- Genre: Soul
- Length: 3:22
- Label: Soul
- Songwriters: Marvin Gaye; Anna Gordy Gaye
- Producers: Marvin Gaye; Richard Morris

The Originals singles chronology
"You're the One" (1969)	"Baby, I'm for Real" (1969)	"The Bells" (1970)

"Baby, I'm for Real" is a soul ballad written by Marvin Gaye and Anna Gordy Gaye, produced by Marvin and recorded and released by American Motown vocal group The Originals for the Soul label issued in 1969.

== History ==
=== The Originals version ===
By the late sixties, male vocal quintet the Originals had been recording mostly background vocals for Motown artists most notably backing up brothers Jimmy Ruffin ("What Becomes of the Brokenhearted") and David Ruffin ("My Whole World Ended (The Moment You Left Me)") respectively. They also were as known for providing background vocals to some of Marvin Gaye's late sixties recordings such as "Chained". But their own singles up until then had failed to generate interest. Having befriended Gaye during recording sessions, the singer promised the group that he'll find them the hit they were searching for. With music written with his wife Anna, Marvin wrote the lyrics to a song called "The Bells I Hear" by Bobby Taylor with The Originals taking the place of The Vancouvers as background vocalists. Different from most Motown recordings of the period, directed by the psychedelic soul productions of Norman Whitfield, the song was a return to a back-to-basics doo-wop inspired approach which was championed by Gaye, who took creative control of the recording as the song's producer. Shelving the song and rewriting it as "Baby I'm For Real" and its follow-up "The Bells", Gaye had each member of the band provide a lead vocal on each of the verses while also singing along in the background. The singer would also produce another song titled "You're the One". While that song failed to chart, he pushed ahead for "...Real". Gaye had protested to Motown CEO Berry Gordy that he wanted to produce his own material and he used the Originals to help get his point across that he can provide a hit as he eventually did for the Originals as "Baby I'm For Real" reached number one on the Billboard Top Black Singles chart and reached number fourteen on the Pop Singles chart, eventually selling over a million copies and putting the Originals on the map for a brief period as recording artists. The song's success paved the way for two more successful Gaye-helmed productions: the follow-up "The Bells" (1970) and "We Can Make It, Baby".

== Cover versions ==
=== Esther Phillips version ===
Esther Phillips recorded a version which peaked at position 38 on Billboard's R&B chart in 1972.

=== Bohannon version ===
In 1980, percussionist Hamilton Bohannon recorded it as a duet with Caroline Crawford and the tune appeared on his Music In The Air LP.

=== Sherrick version ===
Los Angeles–based R&B singer/balladeer Sherrick, released a version of the song on single, which peaked at #53 on Billboard's Hot R&B\Hip-Hop Singles & Tracks chart. It was taken from his 1987 album entitled Sherrick for Warner Bros. Records. On January 22, 1999, Sherrick died at the age of 41, of unknown causes in Los Angeles, California.

=== After 7 version ===
In 1992, R&B group After 7 sought to revive this song while recording their Takin' My Time album. Issued as the first release off that album, they also covered parts of Bloodstone's "Natural High". The song returned to the upper reaches of the R&B charts some twenty-three years after it was first recorded, eventually peaking at number five.

=== "Baby, I'm for Real - '82" ===
The Originals themselves rerecorded the song for the independent Phase II label in 1982. The song was released as "Baby, I'm for Real - '82", and was credited to The Originals featuring group member Hank Dixon. The song was produced by former Motown musician Hamilton Bohannon. It proved to be the group's last single before disbanding.

== Personnel ==
=== The Originals version ===
- Lead and background vocals by The Originals: C. P. Spencer, Henry Dixon, Freddie Gorman and Walter Gaines
- Produced by Marvin Gaye and Richard Morris
- Instrumentation by The Funk Brothers, Marvin Gaye (drums) and the Detroit Symphony Orchestra

=== After 7 version ===
- Lead and background vocals by Melvin Edmonds, Keith Mitchell and Kevon Edmonds
