= Freddie Gorman =

American singer-songwriter

- Born: Frederick Cortez Gorman; April 11, 1939
- Origin: Detroit, Michigan, US
- Died: June 13, 2006 (aged 67)
- Genres: R&B/soul
- Occupations: Singer, songwriter, musician, record producer
- Years active: 1955–2006
- Labels: Motown, Fantasy, Golden World, Ric-Tic

Freddie Gorman (born Frederick Cortez Gorman, April 11, 1939 – June 13, 2006) was an American musician and record producer, most famous as a singer, songwriter for the Motown label in the late 1960s and mid 1970s.

He was a native of Detroit, Michigan. A member of the Motown quartet The Originals, Freddie Gorman was also a vital unsung component of the Motown label's formative development. He co-wrote the label's first #1 pop hit "Please Mr. Postman", by the Marvelettes. In 1964 the biggest selling group of all time, the Beatles released their version, and in 1975 the Carpenters took it back to #1 again. In 2006, "Please Mr. Postman" was inducted into the Songwriters Hall of Fame.

== Biography ==
=== Before Motown ===
Born in Detroit on April 11, 1939, Gorman developed his bass harmonizing on local street corners, and was still in high school when he made his recorded debut on the Qualitones' 1955 Josie Records single "Tears of Love". Two years later Gorman and longtime best friends Brian Holland and Sonny Sanders formed the Fideletones. After issuing "Pretty Girl" on Aladdin Records in 1959, the group splintered and Gorman resumed his day job as a mail carrier.

=== Songwriter and artist for Motown ===
Gorman eventually met with fledgling record impresario Berry Gordy while on his route. In time Gordy hired Holland as a staff writer and producer, teaming him with fellow producer Robert Bateman to cut a single for the Motown girl group the Marvelettes. When Marvelette Georgia Dobbins suggested the title "Please Mr. Postman," Holland conscripted Gorman for help with the lyrics, although his contributions to the song went unnoted for decades. "Please Mr. Postman" was nevertheless a hit, topping the Billboard pop chart in the fall of 1961, and Gordy returned the favor by releasing the Gorman solo single "The Day Will Come" on Motown's Miracle Records subsidiary. Holland and Gorman also continued their songwriting partnership, with collaboration with Berry Gordy for The Supremes' first single "I Want a Guy". Then, Holland and Gorman expanded to a triumvirate with the addition of Lamont Dozier to make it Holland–Dozier–Gorman. After a series of Motown productions including Mary Wells' "Old Love", Smokey Robinson & the Miracles "Mr. Misery (Let Me Be)", The Contours' "Pa, I Need a Car", the Marvelettes' "Forever", "Someday Someway", "Goddess of Love", "Strange I Know", and then Gorman was edged out in favor of Holland's brother Edward, and without any contractual leverage in his favor, he continued to his post office position, dropping from sight for a couple of years. Even though he was edged out by Edward Holland, Freddie and Edward wrote Martha Reeves & the Vandellas's "There He Is (At My Door)".

=== Songwriter and artist for Golden World ===
After leaving Motown, Gorman resurfaced that same year in 1964 writing another top 10 pop hit. But for Motown's rival Golden World Records, their blue-eyed soul/doo-wop group The Reflections song "(Just Like) Romeo and Juliet" was a hit. Then Gorman cut some solo singles, "In a Bad Way" "Take Me Back" "There Can be Too Much" and "Can't Get It Out of My Mind", for Golden World's sister label Ric-Tic.

=== Returns to Motown with The Originals ===
When Gordy acquired Golden World's holdings, Gorman was absorbed back into the Motown ranks and in 1966 was added to the lineup of The Originals, a new vocal group also comprising lead tenor C. P. Spencer, second tenor Hank Dixon, former Anna Records A&R executive and founding member baritone Walter Gaines, and albeit briefly, Joe Stubbs, brother of the Four Tops' renowned lead Levi Stubbs, who exited to pursue a solo career in the wake of the Originals' debut release, a rendition of the Lead Belly perennial "Goodnight Irene". The remaining quartet spent the next two years singing backgrounds for recordings artists, such as Jimmy Ruffin ("What Becomes of the Brokenhearted"), Stevie Wonder ("For Once in My Life" and "Yester-Me, Yester-You, Yesterday"), David Ruffin ("My Whole World Ended (The Moment You Left Me)"), Marvin Gaye ("Chained" and "Just to Keep You Satisfied"), Edwin Starr ("War" and "Twenty-Five Miles"), and many more.

Just before capturing the attention of Gorman's jogging partner Marvin Gaye, who teamed with wife Anna Gordy to write the soulful ballad "Baby I'm for Real". After topping the R&B chart, the single crossed over to pop radio, ascending to the number 14 spot. Gaye also delivered the Originals' follow-up, "The Bells", which reached the R&B Top Five and fell shy of the pop Top Ten in 1970. Because of some creative conflicts with Gaye and his brother-in-law Berry Gordy, the group's commercial fortunes nosedived in the years to follow. In the early 1970s, C.P Spencer left the group to pursue a solo career, therefore leaving former Glass House member Ty Hunter to step in.

=== Life after Motown ===
Although in 1976 The Originals topped the disco charts with the dance floor classic "Down to Love Town", the first-ever 12" single released via the Motown imprint, their 1978 through 1981 albums with other independent record labels, generated minimal interest, and the group's recording career essentially ground to a halt by the mid-1980s, although they continued touring and recording for small independent labels for years to follow.

In 1988, People magazine wrote an illuminating spread about Freddie Gorman.

In 1997, Gorman's son Dillon F. Gorman wrote and produced Freddie's independent solo album, It's All About Love.

=== Transition of The Originals and Gorman's death ===
Ty Hunter died on February 24, 1981, followed by Joe Stubbs on February 5, 1998. He was with the group for about six months in the 1966, as well as a member of The Falcons, The Contours and 100 Proof. C.P. Spencer died from a heart attack on October 20, 2004, and Freddie Gorman died, of lung cancer, on June 13, 2006, at the age of 67. Walter Gaines died January 17, 2012, after a long illness. Dixon is now the only surviving, and active, founding member of the original group.

== Re-formation of The Originals ==
Following the death of Gorman in 2006, longtime member Hank Dixon and Hank's daughter Terrie Dixon re-formed the Originals as a live touring act with Freddie's son songwriter and producer Dillon F. Gorman and son of Gene Chandler. Defrantz Forrest was added to complete the line up.

== See also ==
- List of number-one dance hits (United States)
- List of artists who reached number one on the US Dance chart
