= The Flaming Ember =

American blue-eyed soul band

- Genres: Pop music, soul
- Years active: 1964 – early 1970s
- Labels: Hot Wax Records, Ric-Tic Records

The Flaming Ember was an American blue-eyed soul band from Detroit, Michigan, United States, who found commercial success starting in the late 1960s.

The group originally formed in Detroit in 1964. At that time they were known as The Flaming Embers, named for a local Detroit restaurant. They recorded for Ed Wingate's Ric-Tic label in 1967, scoring an R&B hit written by George Clinton, "Hey Mama Whatcha Got Good For Daddy." When Berry Gordy, Jr.'s Motown Records purchased Golden World Records/Ric-Tic from Wingate, the Flaming Ember chose not to sign with Motown. In 1969, they signed with Hot Wax Records, (the label founded by Brian Holland, Lamont Dozier, and Edward Holland, Jr.), after the band had recorded for a number of smaller Detroit-area labels since 1965. Said Dozier years later, "Their drummer Jerry Plunk was a fantastic, emotional singer."

They dropped the "s" from the band's name and scored a pop and rhythm and blues hit with "Mind, Body and Soul" in 1969, reaching number 26 on the US Billboard pop singles chart. They charted again with their signature song (and heartland rock antecedent) "Westbound #9" (number 24 US pop, number 15 US Billboard R&B chart), and "I'm Not My Brother's Keeper" (number 34 pop, number 12 R&B). The three songs were all released between late 1969 and late 1970.

Follow-up efforts such as 1971's "Stop the World and Let Me Off" were not as successful. After changing their name to "Mind, Body and Soul," they spent the rest of the 1970s playing the Detroit bar circuit.

The band was inducted into the Rockabilly Hall of Fame in 1999.

Reviewing the 1999 compilation Westbound No. 9: The Hot Wax Sessions in AllMusic, Stephen Thomas Erlewine wrote of the band, "At their best, they were a fiery, inspired soul band, taking inspiration from classic Southern soul, Motown, psychedelia, and album rock, resulting in a heady rush of sound where gritty vocals sit next to paisley-colored electric sitars."

== Members ==
- Joe Sladich, guitar (replaced by Mark McCoy in 1972, and in recent reunion), died from throat cancer
- Bill Ellis, keyboards
- John Goins, keyboard, backup vocals from late 1960s to mid-1970s, died December 26, 2018, from kidney failure
- Jim Bugnel, bass guitar (replaced Mike Jackson in 1966)
- Jerry Plunk, drums and lead vocals
- Dennis Mills, bass guitar (early to mid 1970s), played in the group Mind, Body and Soul (not Flaming Ember)
- Larry Gregg, drums, died on 20 April 2010
