= Sherrick (disambiguation) =

Sherrick may refer to:

== People ==
- Sherrick (1957–1999), American soul singer and musician
- Sherrick McManis (born 1987), American football cornerback
- Johnson Sherrick (1841–1914), American politician and businessman from Ohio

== Other ==
- Sherrick (album), self-titled album by Sherrick
- Sherrick Run (Jacobs Creek tributary), water body in Westmoreland County, Pennsylvania
