= The Bells (The Originals song) =

Single by The Originals

from the album Portrait of the Originals
- B-side: "I'll Wait For You"
- Released: January 8, 1970
- Recorded: 1969, Hitsville, USA (Studio A), Detroit, Michigan
- Genre: Soul
- Length: 3:02
- Label: Soul (Motown); S 35069
- Songwriters: Marvin Gaye; Anna Gordy Gaye; Iris Gordy; Elgie Stover
- Producer: Marvin Gaye

The Originals singles chronology
"Baby, I'm for Real" (1969)	"The Bells" (1970)	"We Can Make It, Baby" (1970)

"The Bells" is a 1970 single recorded by The Originals for Motown's Soul label, produced by Marvin Gaye and co-written by Gaye, his wife Anna Gordy Gaye, Iris Gordy, and Elgie Stover.

== History ==
Shortly after the release of the Originals' first hit "Baby, I'm for Real", Motown issued this similarly produced record, which was a Marvin Gaye production. Gaye had proved skeptics at the label wrong by producing a hit song for another act. Both "Baby I'm for Real" and "The Bells" set the precedent for Gaye's 1971 landmark album What's Going On.

Primarily functioning as background session singers at Motown during much of the 1960s, The Originals would continue to provide background vocals for Gaye until 1973.

"The Bells" peaked at number 12 on the Billboard Hot 100 in the United States, and reached number four on the Hot Black Singles chart. It remains the most successful single of the group's career, the rest of which included several more Gaye-produced R&B hits and the Frank Wilson and Michael B. Sutton's disco dance hit "Down to Love Town".

=== Chart performance ===
Chart (1970)	Peak position
US Billboard Hot 100	12
US Billboard Best Selling Soul Singles	4

== Personnel ==
- Lead vocals by Walter Gaines, Henry Dixon and C.P. Spencer
- Background vocals by The Originals: Freddie Gorman, Walter Gaines, Henry Dixon and C.P. Spencer
- Spoken interlude by Freddie Gorman
- Instrumentation by The Funk Brothers, Marvin Gaye (drums) and the Detroit Symphony Orchestra

== Other covers ==
=== Laura Nyro version ===
On her 1971 album Gonna Take a Miracle, singer-songwriter Laura Nyro performed a version of "The Bells" with backing vocals by the group Labelle.

=== Color Me Badd version ===
Two decades later, 1990s R&B band Color Me Badd covered the song on their 1993 album, Time and Chance. Much like After 7's cover of "Baby I'm for Real" two years prior, the song entered the R&B charts again, but didn't prove to be as successful as After 7's venture.
