= Eddie Wingate =

Ed Wingate Jr. (13 February 1919 – 5 May 2006) was an African-American record label owner based in Detroit in the 1960s. Although never convicted, he was implicated as a major figure in the illegal numbers game in Detroit.

Wingate was born on 13 February 1919 in Moultrie, Georgia. In the 1930s, his family relocated to Detroit, where he pursued his passion to write and produce music, co-founding Golden World Records in 1961. He developed a roster of artists that included Edwin Starr, The Parliaments, The Fantastic Four, J.J. Barnes, Laura Lee, The Reflections, and Gino Washington, eventually growing his family of entertainment ventures to include Golden World Records, Golden World Studios, and the Ric-Tic label. He sold the Golden World brand to his local competitor, Motown's Berry Gordy, in 1968.

== Music industry career ==
In 1961, after rejecting a previous offer to become a partner in the prominent African-American owned label Motown, Wingate partnered with Joanne Bratton to launch Golden World Records. The company consisted of a record label and publishing company, differentiating itself from its competitors by advertising for the talent they were representing. By 1963, the company had become comparable to Motown. Wingate and Bratton formed separate record labels within the Golden World brand, including Wingate, J&W, and Ric-Tic. They also set up their own recording facilities and launched local artists. In 1968, after five years of operation, Golden World and Ric-Tic were acquired by Berry Gordy and absorbed into Motown.

== "Detroit Numbers" ==
In 1928, the numbers game had become so popular in Detroit that winning numbers were published in the local newspapers to stimulate sales. By the 1960s, many African-Americans who had been shut out of traditional employment within Detroit were drawn to entrepreneurship and became involved in numbers games. This involved the acceptance and collection of bets, drawing the winning numbers, and if a customer got lucky and "hit", a "banker" would be responsible for paying out the winnings.

FBI informants within the Detroit numbers game named Eddie Wingate, Clarence Williams, John Judson White, Walter Simmons, and Burrell "Junior" Pace as main numbers operators within the city. Informants also stated that Wingate started off a "small man" and quickly rose to fame because he was able to take over the Black market, which had been run by Italian players. In her book, Bridgett Davis discusses her mother's experience working with Wingate in the numbers game, and spoke of him as intimidating and extremely demanding in instances when the numbers were not turned in and winnings were not distributed properly.

== Death and legacy ==
Wingate died in Las Vegas, Nevada on 5 May 2006. He was 86 years old. Many Detroit artists remember him for his record label, which was considered a powerhouse that many viewed as a threat to Motown Records.

In the online guestbook attached to Wingate's death notice on the websites of the Detroit Free Press and Detroit News, Laura Lee wrote, "I have Ed Wingate to thank for giving me my first hit record 'To Win Your Heart.' He will be truly missed." Furthermore, Don Davis, chairman of First Independence Bank in Detroit claimed Wingate told him "he loved me like a son and I told him I loved him like a father." Davis even said he wanted to write a book that would illustrate how many black entrepreneurs were mentored, helped, and influenced by Wingate. "He was the go-to guy to get anything done of any magnitude if you were black," said Davis. "The guy who held the community together".

== See also ==
- Detroit Partnership
- The 20 Grand
- Berry Gordy
