= The Whole World Is a Stage =

Single by The Fantastic Four

from the album (The Best of) The Fantastic Four
- B-side: "Ain't Love Wonderful"
- Released: March 1967
- Recorded: 1966; Golden World (Studio B) (Detroit, Michigan)
- Genre: Soul, R&B
- Length: 2:45
- Label: Ric-Tic; RT122
- Songwriter(s): Albert Hamilton; Ronnie Savoy; Edward Wingate
- Producer(s): Al Kent; Ed Wingate

The Fantastic Four singles chronology
"Can't Stop Looking for My Baby" (1966)	"The Whole World Is a Stage" (1967)	"You Gave Me Something" (1967)

"The Whole World Is a Stage" is a 1966 song recorded by American R&B music group the Fantastic Four for the Ric-Tic label. It was written by Albert "Al" Hamilton, Eugene Hamilton (under the pseudonym of Ronnie Savoy), and Ed Wingate and produced by Al Kent (a pseudonym for Al Hamilton) and Wingate. Group member "Sweet" James Epps led the recording and was backed by Ralph Pruitt, Joseph Pruitt, and Wallace "Toby" Childs.

The group's third single, "The Whole World Is a Stage," was their only big hit single, peaking at number 6 on the US Billboard R&B chart in 1967. It also charted on the U.S. Billboard Hot 100, peaking at number 63.
