= Stop-N-Go =

Stop-N-Go may refer to:

- National Convenience Stores' primary subsidiary "Stop-n-Go"
- Stop–N–Go, a regional chain acquired by Kwik Trip
- Stop & Go, a 1973 studio album by Hamilton Bohannon
- "Stop-N-Go", a song on the 2007 album Underground Kingz by UGK
- Stop N Go Light, nickname for a traffic light
