= Love Child (The Supremes album) =

Studio album by Diana Ross & the Supremes
- Released: November 13, 1968
- Recorded: February 17 – October 2, 1968
- Genres: Pop; R&B
- Labels: Motown; MS 670
- Producers: Berry Gordy; Frank Wilson; R. Dean Taylor; Deke Richards; Henry Cosby; Smokey Robinson; Nickolas Ashford & Valerie Simpson; Marv Johnson; George Gordy; Harvey Fuqua; Johnny Bristol

Diana Ross & the Supremes chronology
Diana Ross & the Supremes Join The Temptations (1968)	Love Child (1968)	TCB (1968)

Singles from Love Child
- 1. "Some Things You Never Get Used To" Released: May 21, 1968; 2. "Love Child" Released: September 30, 1968

Professional ratings
Review scores
Source	Rating
Allmusic	4/5 stars

Love Child is the fifteenth studio album released by Diana Ross & the Supremes for the Motown label in 1968. The LP was the group's first studio LP (excepting covers and tribute albums) not to include any songs written or produced by any member of the Holland–Dozier–Holland production team, who had previously overseen most of the Supremes' releases.

== Track listing ==
=== Side one ===
1. "Love Child" (Pam Sawyer, R. Dean Taylor, Frank Wilson, Deke Richards) – 2:55
2. "Keep an Eye" (Nickolas Ashford, Valerie Simpson) – 2:59
3. "How Long Has That Evening Train Been Gone" (Sawyer, Wilson) – 2:46
4. "Does Your Mama Know About Me" (Tom Baird, Tommy Chong) – 2:52
5. "Honey Bee (Keep on Stinging Me)" (Janie Bradford, Debbie Dean, Richards) – 2:20
6. "Some Things You Never Get Used To" (Ashford, Simpson) – 2:24

=== Side two ===
1. "He's My Sunny Boy" (Smokey Robinson) – 2:18
2. "You've Been So Wonderful to Me" (Anna Gordy Gaye, George Gordy, Allen Story) – 2:31
3. "(Don't Break These) Chains of Love" (George Beauchamp, Harvey Fuqua, Johnny Bristol) – 2:23
4. "You Ain't Livin' Till You're Lovin'" (Ashford, Simpson) – 2:41
5. "I'll Set You Free" (Gwen Fuqua, B. Gordy, Ivy Jo Hunter, Renee Tener) – 2:37
6. "Can't Shake It Loose" (Sidney Barnes, George Clinton, Joanne Jackson, Rose Marie McCoy) – 2:07

=== Unused Recordings from the Love Child timeframe (March – November 1968) ===
1. "The Beginning Of The End Of Love" (Richards-Taylor-Dean)
2. "Sweet Thing" (Robinson-Johnson-Cleveland)
3. "In The Evening Of Our Love" (Miner)
4. "Wish I Knew" (Richards-Dean)
5. "If You Should Walk Away" (Wilson-Gordy)
6. "I Can't Give Back The Love I Feel For You" (Ashford-Simpson-Holland)
7. "Ain't No Sun Since You've Been Gone" (Whitfield-Moy-Grant)
8. "Those Precious Memories" (Wilson-Sawyer)
9. "Can't You See It's Me" (Goga-Hunter-Sawyer) (Released on their 1969 Cream of the Crop album.)
10. "When It's To The Top (Still I Won't Stop Giving You Love)" (Dean-Weatherspoon-Weatherspoon) (Released on their 1969 Cream of the Crop album.)

== Personnel ==
=== Performers ===
- Diana Ross – lead vocals
- Mary Wilson – backing vocals (side 1: track 3–4; side 2: tracks 1, 2, and 5–6)
- Cindy Birdsong – backing vocals (side 1: track 3–4; side 2: tracks 1, 2, and 5–6)
- The Andantes – backing vocals (side 1: tracks 1, 3–5; side 2: track 3)
- Nickolas Ashford – backing vocals (side 1: tracks 2 and 6; side 2: tracks 4 and 6)
- Valerie Simpson – backing vocals (side 1: tracks 2 and 6; side 2: tracks 4 and 6)
- The Funk Brothers – instrumentation (side 1: tracks 1 – 3, 5 and 6; all of side 2)
- Detroit Symphony Orchestra – instrumentation (side 1: tracks 1 – 3, 5 and 6; side 2: tracks 2–5)
- Los Angeles-area session musicians – instrumentation (side 1: track 4)

=== Production ===
- Nickolas Ashford, Valerie Simpson – producers, "Keep an Eye", "Some Things You'll Never Get Used To", "You Ain't Livin' Until You're Lovin'"
- R. Dean Taylor – producer, "Love Child"
- Frank Wilson – producer, "How Long Has That Evening Train Been Gone", "Does Your Mama Know About Me", "Love Child"
- Deke Richards – producer, "Honey Bee (Keep on Stinging Me)", "Does Your Mama Know About Me", "Love Child"
- Smokey Robinson – producer, "He's My Sunny Boy"
- George Gordy – producer, "You've Been So Wonderful to Me"
- Harvey Fuqua – producer, "(Don't Break These) Chains Of Love"
- Johnny Bristol – producer, "(Don't Break These) Chains Of Love"
- Berry Gordy, Jr. – producer, "I'll Set You Free", "Love Child"
- Henry Cosby – producer, "Can't Shake It Loose", "Love Child"

== Charts ==
=== Weekly charts ===
Chart (1968–69)	Peak position
Canada Top Albums/CDs (RPM)	11
Norwegian Albums (VG-lista)	10
UK Albums (Official Charts)	13
UK R&B Albums (Record Mirror)	2
US Billboard 200	14
US Top R&B/Hip-Hop Albums (Billboard)	13

=== Year-end charts ===
Chart (1969)	Rank
US Top R&B/Hip-Hop Albums (Billboard)	40
US Cashbox Top 100	82
