= Stop-and-go =

A stop-and-go may refer to:

- Stop-and-go route, in American football
- Stop-go, a penalty in motorsport; see Formula One regulations § Penalties
- Stop & Go, a 1973 album by American musician Hamilton Bohannon
- Traffic wave

== See also ==
- Go-Stop, a Korean card game
