= Some Things You Never Get Used To =

- Solid center variant of the UK single

Single by Diana Ross & the Supremes

from the album Love Child
- B-side: "You've Been So Wonderful to Me"
- Released: May 21, 1968
- Recorded: Hitsville U.S.A. (Studio A); 1968
- Genre: Pop, psychedelic pop, soul
- Length: 2:23
- Label: Motown; M 1126
- Songwriter: Nickolas Ashford; Valerie Simpson
- Producers: Ashford & Simpson

Diana Ross & the Supremes singles chronology
"Forever Came Today" (1968)	"Some Things You Never Get Used To" (1968)	"Love Child" (1968)

Love Child track listing
- 12 tracks Side one: 1. "Love Child"; 2. "Keep an Eye"; 3. "How Long Has That Evening Train Been Gone"; 4. "Does Your Mama Know About Me"; 5. "Honey Bee (Keep on Stinging Me)"; 6. "Some Things You Never Get Used To"; Side two: 7. "He's My Sunny Boy"; 8. "You've Been So Wonderful to Me"; 9. "(Don't Break These) Chains of Love"; 10. "You Ain't Livin' Till You're Lovin'"; 11. "I'll Set You Free"; 12. "Can't Shake It Loose"

"Some Things You Never Get Used To" is a song released in 1968 by Diana Ross & the Supremes on the Motown label. The single stalled for three weeks at number 30 on the U.S. Billboard pop chart in July 1968. It became the lowest-charting Supremes single since 1963 and became the catalyst for Berry Gordy to revamp songwriting for The Supremes since the loss of Motown's premier production team Holland–Dozier–Holland, which Gordy had assigned as the group's sole producers after the success of "When the Lovelight Starts Shining Through His Eyes."

Cash Box praised the "charming performance from Diana Ross, and here-and-there sound effect splashes."

== Personnel ==
- Lead vocals by Diana Ross
- Background vocals by Ashford & Simpson
- Instrumentation by The Funk Brothers and the Detroit Symphony Orchestra

== Track listing ==
- 7" single (21 May 1968) (North America/United Kingdom)
1. "Some Things You Never Get Used To" – 2:23
2. "You've Been So Wonderful to Me" – 2:28

== Charts ==
Chart (1968)	Peak position
Australia (Kent Music Report)	98
Canada Top Singles (RPM)	25
UK Singles (Official Charts)	34
UK R&B (Record Mirror)	9
US Billboard Hot 100	30
US Hot R&B/Hip-Hop Songs (Billboard)	43
US Cashbox Top 100	22
US Cashbox R&B	26
US Record World 100 Top Pops	21
US Record World Top 50 R&B	17

== Covers ==
The song has never had a high-profile remake. Motown singer Frances Nero recorded a version of the song several decades after she left the company, for Ian Levine and his Motorcity Records project.

It should not be confused with a 1965 song (with the same title), written by Van McCoy and recorded by Cilla Black, Irma Thomas, local Detroit singer Juanita Williams, and Detroit band The San Remo Strings.
