= Mind, Body and Soul =

Single by Flaming Ember

from the album Westbound #9
- B-side: "Filet De Soul"
- Released: September 1969 (U.S.)
- Recorded: 1969
- Genre: Soul
- Length: 2:57
- Label: Hot Wax Records
- Songwriters: R. Dunbar, E. Wayne
- Producer: R. Dunbar

Flaming Ember singles chronology
"Mind, Body and Soul" (1969)	"Shades of Green" (1970)

"Mind, Body and Soul" is a song written by Ron Dunbar and “Edyth Wayne” (pseudonym for Holland, Dozier and Holland) and originally recorded by Detroit-based R&B group the Flaming Ember in 1969. It was the first of three singles released from their Westbound #9 LP.

The song reached number 26 on the U.S. Billboard Hot 100 and number 19 on Cash Box. In Canada, it spent two weeks at number 13.

== Chart history ==
Chart (1969)	Peak position
Canada RPM Top Singles	13
US Billboard Hot 100	26
US Cash Box Top 100	19

== Other versions ==
Jerry Walsh recorded a version of the song. Backed with "Early in the Morning", it was released on Allied International PPX 306.
