= Love Child (song) =

- Side A of the Canadian single

Single by Diana Ross & the Supremes

from the album Love Child
- B-side: "Will This Be the Day"
- Released: September 30, 1968
- Recorded: September 17, 19-20, 1968
- Studio: Hitsville U.S.A. (Studio A), Detroit, Michigan
- Genre: Psychedelic soul; psychedelic pop
- Length: 2:54 (album/single version); 3:14 (2003 remix)
- Label: Motown; M 1135
- Songwriters: R. Dean Taylor; Frank Wilson; Pam Sawyer; Deke Richards
- Producers: "The Clan" (Taylor/Wilson/Sawyer/Richards); Henry Cosby

Diana Ross & the Supremes singles chronology
"Some Things You Never Get Used To" (1968)	"Love Child" (1968)	"I'm Gonna Make You Love Me" (1968)

Love Child track listing
- 12 tracks Side one: 1. "Love Child"; 2. "Keep an Eye"; 3. "How Long Has That Evening Train Been Gone"; 4. "Does Your Mama Know About Me"; 5. "Honey Bee (Keep on Stinging Me)"; 6. "Some Things You Never Get Used To"; Side two: 7. "He's My Sunny Boy"; 8. "You've Been So Wonderful to Me"; 9. "(Don't Break These) Chains of Love"; 10. "You Ain't Livin' Till You're Lovin'"; 11. "I'll Set You Free"; 12. "Can't Shake It Loose"

External media
- "Love Child" (audio) on YouTube
- "Love Child" (The Ed Sullivan Show, January 5, 1969) on YouTube

"Love Child" is a 1968 song released by the Motown label for Diana Ross & the Supremes. The second single and title track from their album Love Child, it became the Supremes' 11th number-one single in the United States, where it sold 500,000 copies in its first week and 2 million copies by year's end.

The record took just three weeks to reach the Top Ten of Billboard's Hot 100 pop chart, which eventually it topped for two weeks (issues dated November 30 and December 7, 1968), before being dethroned by an even bigger Motown single, Marvin Gaye's "I Heard It Through the Grapevine". "Love Child" also performed well on the soul chart — where it spent three weeks at no. 2 (behind Johnnie Taylor's "Who's Making Love") — and paved new ground for a major pop hit with its then-controversial subject matter of illegitimacy. It is also the single that finally knocked the Beatles' "Hey Jude" off the top spot in the United States after its nine-week run. The Supremes debuted the dynamic and intense song on the season premiere of the CBS variety program The Ed Sullivan Show on Sunday, September 29, 1968. In Billboard's special 2015 chart of the Top 40 Biggest Girl Groups of All Time on the Billboard Hot 100, "Love Child" ranked highest among the Supremes' six entries.

== History ==
=== Recording ===
In 1967, Diana Ross & the Supremes dropped Florence Ballard, engaged new member Cindy Birdsong and added Ross's name to the billing. Following this string of changes, the Supremes had mixed success on the pop charts. "Reflections" peaked at no. 2 on the Billboard's Hot 100 and "In and Out of Love" peaked at 9, but the group's next two singles did not reach the Top 20.

This prompted Motown label chief Berry Gordy to hold a special meeting in a room at the Pontchartrain Hotel in Detroit, which was attended by a team of writers and producers at the label, including R. Dean Taylor, Frank Wilson, Pam Sawyer, Deke Richards, and Henry Cosby. The group, calling themselves the Clan, set to work on a hit single for Diana Ross & the Supremes. Instead of composing another love-based song, the team decided to craft a tune about a woman who is asking her boyfriend not to pressure her into sleeping with him, for fear they would conceive a "love child". The woman, portrayed on the record by Diana Ross, is herself a love child, and, besides not having a father at home, had to endure wearing rags to school and growing up in an "old, cold, run-down tenement slum." The background vocals echo this sentiment, asking the boyfriend to please "wait/wait won't you wait now/hold on/wait/just a little bit longer."

As was nearly always the case on singles released under the "Diana Ross & the Supremes" name, Supremes members Mary Wilson and Cindy Birdsong do not perform on the record; Motown session singers The Andantes performed the background vocals. All lead vocals were by Diana Ross, who would leave the group in a year for a solo career.

=== Reaction and response ===
The public responded immediately to "Love Child" when it was released as a single on September 30, 1968, reaching number one on Billboard's Hot 100 and becoming the third biggest selling Supremes' single behind "Baby Love" and "Someday We'll Be Together." The feat was repeated in Canada, where it also reached number one in the RPM 100 national singles chart. In the UK singles chart, the record peaked at no. 15, and no. 3 in Australia. Given that the single spent a then lengthy 11 weeks in the Top Ten of Billboard's Hot 100 (the longest of any Supremes hit), its 1968 year-end ranking of 27 is low-seeming. But the ranking, which covers the period up to and including the issue dated December 14, 1968, is based on only nine of its 16 weeks on the Hot 100 (and four of the unused seven weeks were spent in the Top Ten). The track's parent LP Love Child was released on November 13, 1968.

Cash Box said that "Diana Ross clicks with a contemporary narrative message which (accompanied by up-tempo beat and pop arrangements) open up a new top forty image for the act."

== Track listing ==
- 7" single (30 September 1968) (North America/United Kingdom)
1. "Love Child" – 2:59
2. "Will This Be the Day" – 2:50
- 7" single (1968) (Netherlands)
1. "Love Child" – 2:59
2. "Misery Makes Its Home in My Heart " – 2:52

== Personnel ==
- Lead vocals by Diana Ross
- Background vocals by the Andantes: Jackie Hicks, Marlene Barrow, and Louvain Demps
- Instrumentation by the Funk Brothers and the Detroit Symphony Orchestra

== Charts ==
=== Weekly charts ===
Chart (1968–1969)	Peak position
Australia (Go-Set)	4
Australia (Kent Music Report)	2
Canada Top Singles (RPM)	1
Ireland (IRMA)	12
Japan (Oricon)	23
Netherlands (Dutch Top 40)	18
Netherlands (Single Top 100)	19
New Zealand (Listener)	1
Sweden (Kvällstoppen)	7
Switzerland (Schweizer Hitparade)	7
UK Singles (Official Charts)	15
UK R&B (Record Mirror)	1
US Billboard Hot 100	1
US Hot R&B/Hip-Hop Songs (Billboard)	2
US Cash Box Top 100	1
US Cash Box R&B	1
US Record World 100 Top Pops	1
US Record World Top 50 R&B	1

=== Year-end charts ===
Chart (1968)	Rank
Australia (Kent Music Report)	19
Canada Top Singles (RPM)	61
US Billboard Hot 100	27
Chart (1969)	Rank
Canada Top Singles (RPM)	93
Japan Foreign Hits (Billboard)	21
US Cash Box Top 100	30
US Cash Box R&B	19

== Certifications and sales ==
Region	Certification	Certified units/sales
United States	—	2,000,000

== Notable cover versions ==
- It was covered in 1990 by Sweet Sensation. Their cover peaked at number 13 in May 1990 on the Billboard Hot 100.

== Use in popular culture ==
In 2010 Korean-born American professional skateboarder Daewon Song recreated the first part of his Love Child run trick-for-trick for a DVS Shoes promotional video.

== See also ==
- List of Hot 100 number-one singles of 1968 (U.S.)
- Illegitimacy in fiction

== Bibliography ==
- Chin, Brian and Nathan, David (2000). "Reflections Of..." The Supremes [CD Box Set]. New York: Motown Record Co./Universal Music.
- Posner, Gerald (2002). Motown : Music, Money, Sex, and Power. New York: Random House. ISBN 0-375-50062-6.
- Wilson, Mary and Romanowski, Patricia (1986, 1990, 2000). Dreamgirl & Supreme Faith: My Life as a Supreme. New York: Cooper Square Publishers. ISBN 0-8154-1000-X.
