= J. J. Barnes =

American singer-songwriter (1943–2022)

J.J. Barnes

Background information
- Born: James Jay Barnes; November 30, 1943; Detroit, Michigan, U.S.
- Died: December 10, 2022 (aged 79)
- Genres: Soul, pop, R&B
- Occupation: Singer
- Instrument: Vocals
- Years active: 1960–2022
- Labels: Motown; Ric-Tic; Micay Records; Groovesville; Buddah; Contempo Records

James Jay Barnes (November 30, 1943 – December 10, 2022) was an American R&B singer and songwriter.

== Biography ==
He recorded several singles, starting in 1960. His early releases including "Just One More Time" and "Please Let Me In", on the record labels Mickay and Ric-Tic, had relatively little success, but were subsequently picked up as Northern soul favorites in the UK. He was later signed to Motown Records, where he contributed as a songwriter but did not have any recordings released as a singer. Some of his Motown material has subsequently been released on the A Cellarful of Motown! compilation album series.

Barnes was a member of the Holidays, a trio which also included Edwin Starr and Steve Mancha. They had a #7 R&B hit in June 1966 with "I'll Love You Forever" (#43 in Canada). Barnes' biggest hit single came in 1967 with "Baby Please Come Back Home" on the Groovesville label, which, like many of his records, he co-wrote. The song reached No. 9 on the US Billboard R&B chart, and No. 25 in Canada. However, subsequent singles on a variety of labels, including covers of "Black Ivory" on Today/Perception Records, failed to repeat the success.

On the recommendation of his friend Edwin Starr, Barnes moved to England in the 1970s, becoming popular. Starr had arranged for Barnes to appear on a series of shows, which led to him signing a deal with Contempo Records. He became a favorite artist of the UK Northern soul scene, and performed frequently in the UK. Early recordings from Barnes, such as "Please Let Me In" and "Real Humdinger", were re-released in the UK on the Tamla Motown label to cater for the buyers of Northern soul records.

In the 1970s, Contempo Records released seven singles and an album, Sara Smile from Barnes, all without chart success. In the 1980s, he released five more records including a version of the Northern soul favorite by Frank Wilson, "Do I Love You (Indeed I Do)", and he recorded with producer Ian Levine in the 1990s.

His song "Chains of Love", originally the B-side of his 1967 hit "Baby Please Come Back Home", achieved further renown when it was covered by the Dirtbombs on their Ultraglide in Black album in 2001.

Barnes died on December 10, 2022, at the age of 79.
