= Sherrick (album) =

Studio album by Sherrick
- Released: 1987
- Genres: R&B, Soul
- Length: 36:41
- Label: Warner Bros.
- Producers: Michael Stokes, Sherrick; Bobby Sandstrom (track 7); Steve Barri (track 7)

Sherrick is the only studio album from American soul singer and musician Sherrick, released by Warner Bros. in 1987. It was largely produced by Michael Stokes and Sherrick, except two tracks, one which was produced solely by Sherrick and another by Bobby Sandstrom and Steve Barri.

== Background ==
Although it failed to enter the US Billboard 200 chart, Sherrick reached No. 44 on the R&B/Hip-Hop Albums Chart. In the UK, the album reached No. 27.

== Singles ==
Five singles were released from the album. "Just Call" was the most successful single, reaching No. 8 on the Billboard Hot R&B/Hip-Hop Singles & Tracks chart, No. 26 in Ireland, and No. 23 in the UK. "Let's Be Lovers Tonight" was a UK only release which peaked at No. 63. A cover of The Originals Marvin/Anna Gaye-penned track "Baby I'm for Real" managed to peak at No. 53 on the Billboard Hot R&B/Hip-Hop Singles & Tracks chart. The next single was the US release of "Tell Me What It Is", which failed to make any charting impact, while "This Must Be Love" was released in the UK only as a promotional 12" vinyl single.

== Reception ==
Professional ratings
Review scores
Source	Rating
AllMusic	3/5 stars
The Philadelphia Inquirer	2/4 stars
Record Mirror	4.5/5 stars

Upon release, Billboard wrote: "'Just Call' is a pop hit in the UK, boding well for crossover here. Rest of the material hews to the mainstream as well, but lingering soullessness of arrangements often offsets appeal of Sherrick's impressive vocals." The Philadelphia Inquirer commented: "This singer possesses a big, burly croon reminiscent of Teddy Pendergrass, and shares that singer's weakness - poor material. Even strong, charming singing cannot save the series of macho-man-in-love scenarios he seems to favor all too much."

In a retrospective review, Andrew Hamilton of AllMusic stated: "Sherrick's only solo shot displayed the problematic singer's compelling way with words, music, and writing skills. His strong tenor caresses and entices on "Just Call" and a strong rendition of "Baby I'm for Real". Mike Stokes and Sherrick contributed the bulk of the original songs that speak of love, love, and more love."

== Track listing ==
No.	Title	Writer(s)	Length
1.	"Tell Me What It Is"	Sherrick	3:53
2.	"Just Call"	Sherrick, Ralph Hawkins, Jr.	4:13
3.	"Baby I'm for Real"	Marvin Gaye, Anna Gordy Gaye	4:20
4.	"This Must Be Love"	Sherrick, Michael Stokes	3:20
5.	"Do You Baby"	Sherrick, N. Johnson, R. Leigh	3:24
6.	"All Because of You"	Sherrick, Stokes	4:33
7.	"Let's Be Lovers Tonight"	Michael Price, Bobby Sandstrom, Steve Barri	4:02
8.	"Lady You Are"	Sherrick, Stokes, R. Singleton, D. Fletcher	4:54
9.	"Send for Me"	Sherrick	3:52

== Charts ==
Album

Chart (1987)	Peak position
UK Albums Chart	27
US Billboard R&B Albums	44

=== Singles ===
Just Call

Chart (1987)	Peak position
Ireland Singles Chart	26
UK Singles Chart	23
US Billboard Hot Black Singles	8

Let's Be Lovers Tonight

Chart (1987)	Peak position
UK Singles Chart	63

Baby I'm for Real

Chart (1987)	Peak position
US Billboard Hot Black Singles	53

== Personnel ==
- Producers – Michael Stokes (tracks 1–6, 8), Sherrick (tracks 1–6, 8, 9), Bobby Sandstrom (track 7), Steve Barri (track 7)
- Executive Producer – Benny Medina, Ray Singleton
- Mastering – Brian Gardner
- Rhythm Arrangements Arrangement - Michael Stokes (tracks 1–6, 8, 9), Sherrick (tracks 1–6, 8, 9), Richard Elliot (track 7)
- String Arrangements – Gene Page, Sherrick
- Vocal Arrangements – Sherrick
- Art Direction, Logo Design – Kav Deluxe
- Clothing For G.H.Q. (cover photography) – Axis
- Hair (cover photography) – Alison Greenpalm, Toni Greene
- Make-Up (cover photography) – Tara Posey
- Nails (cover photography) – Renee
- Photography – Jeff Katz
