= The Reflections (Detroit band) =

1960s Detroit blue-eyed soul group

The Reflections are an American blue-eyed soul/doo-wop group from Detroit, Michigan, United States. They had one hit single in 1964 called "(Just Like) Romeo and Juliet", written by Bob Hamilton and Freddie Gorman. The song was produced by Rob Reeco on Golden World Records. The disc reached number 6 on the Billboard Hot 100 chart, and number 9 on the Cash Box chart. The record was even more popular in rhythm and blues locations, reaching number 3 on that Cashbox chart, and was featured on American Bandstand as a "spotlight dance". A cover version by new wave band Mental As Anything hit number 27 on the Australian charts in 1980.

"(Just Like) Romeo and Juliet" and "Adam and Eve" were popular on the Northern soul scene. After a few more records that were moderate successes on the national charts, Ray Steinberg left the group for other interests. As a foursome, The Reflections continued recording and making TV appearances. In 1965, they made their one and only movie appearance in Winter-A-Go-Go, performing "I'm Sweet On You". They were signed to the same Detroit R&B label as their blue-eyed soul peers, The Flaming Ember and The Shades Of Blue.

== Original group members ==
- Tony Micale — lead vocals, born August 23, 1942, in Bronx, New York
- Phil Castrodale — first tenor, born April 2, 1942, in Detroit, Michigan
- Dan Bennie — second tenor, born Daniel Hunter Bennie, March 13, 1940, in Johnstone, Scotland – died April 7, 2008.
- Ray Steinberg — baritone, born October 29, 1942, in Washington, Pennsylvania
- John Dean — bass, born November 9, 1941, in Detroit, Michigan – died March 8, 2022.
- Frank Amodeo — lead vocals, replaced Tony Micale in 1966. Born December 16, 1938, in Brooklyn, New York – died 2009.

== Discography with Billboard (BB) & Cashbox (CB) chart positions ==
=== Singles ===
- "Helpless" / "You Said Goodbye" — Kay-Ko 1003 — 1963
- "(Just Like) Romeo & Juliet" (BB number 6, CB number 9)/"Can't You Tell By The Look In My Eyes" — Golden World 8/9 — 3/64
- "Like Columbus Did" (BB number 96, CB number 83)/"Lonely Girl" — Golden World 12 — 6/64
- "Talkin' About my Girl" / "Oowee Now Now" — Golden World 15 — 8/64
- "(I'm Just) A Henpecked Guy" (BB number 123)/"Don't Do That to Me" — Golden World 16 — 9/64
- "Shabby Little Hut" (BB number 121, CB number 80)/"You're my Baby (And Don't You Forget It)" — Golden World 19 — 11/64
- "Poor Man's Son" (BB number 55, CB number 55)/"Comin' at You" — Golden World 20 — 2/65
- "Deborah Ann" / "Wheelin' & Dealin'" — Golden World 22 — 6/65
- "Out of the Picture" / "June Bride" — Golden World 24 — 7/65
- "Girl in the Candy Store" / "Your Kind of Love" — Golden World 29 — 9/65
- "Like Adam & Eve" / "Vito's House" — ABC-Paramount 10794 — 1966 [Lead vocals sung by Frank Amodeo]
- "You're Gonna Find Out (You Need Me)" / "The Long Cigarette" — ABC-Paramount 10822 — 1966 [Lead vocals sung by Frank Amodeo]

=== Album ===
- (Just Like) Romeo & Juliet — Golden World GW LPM-300 (Released in mono only)

==== Side 1 ====
1. "(Just Like) Romeo & Juliet"
2. "Talkin' About My Girl"
3. "Can't You Tell By the Look in my Eyes"
4. "Deborah Ann"
5. "On Broadway"
6. "Don't Do That to Me"

==== Side 2 ====
1. "Like Columbus Did"
2. "June Bride"
3. "Gonna Turn the Place Out"
4. "Lonely Girl"
5. "Oowee Now Now"
6. "Couldn't Make It Like That"

== See also ==
- List of 1960s one-hit wonders in the United States
- List of doo-wop musicians
- List of acts who appeared on American Bandstand
