= Sherrick =

American soul singer (1957–1999)

- Born: Lamotte Smith; July 6, 1957; Sacramento, California, United States
- Died: January 22, 1999 (aged 41) Los Angeles, California
- Genres: R&B, soul
- Occupation: Singer–songwriter
- Instrument: Vocals
- Years active: 1985–1999
- Label: Warner Bros. Records

Sherrick (July 6, 1957 – January 22, 1999) was an American soul singer and musician.

== Biography ==
He was born F Lamonte-Smith; or Lamotte Smith in 1957 in Sacramento, California, United States.

Sherrick was given his professional break by producer Raynoma Gordy Singleton (née Mayberry), former wife of Motown founder Berry Gordy. Sherrick was the lead singer of the Motown group, Kagny, who recorded a song for the Motown movie, The Last Dragon in 1985.

He signed with Warner Bros. Records in 1987, co-producing an album with Michael Stokes and with Ray Singleton as an executive producer. The album, titled Sherrick, included "Just Call" which reached number 8 in the US Billboard R&B chart. A version of the Originals' major hit of the late 1960s, "Baby I'm for Real" also charted, peaking at number 53. He also had two entries in the UK Singles Chart in 1987. These were "Just Call" (number 23) and "Let's Be Lovers Tonight" (number 63). In addition, his album, Sherrick reached number 27 in the UK Albums Chart the same year.

Sherrick attended rehab sessions while finishing up his debut album (1987). He decided to do a promotional tour across the USA where his album and singles' success was limited, to garner interest. However, he went on 'cocaine-finding missions' in every city on the itinerary for the tour not having returned and missing subsequent engagements. It became clear that he had an issue with cocaine addiction after he eventually returned. He worked on what was to become his second album although its production ended prematurely after he took thousands of dollars in advance money. His second album was never completed causing Raynoma Gordy Singleton to absolve herself from further assistance in its production. It caused her to write a chapter in her book entitled The Untold Story: Berry, Me, and Motown. Sherrick disappeared from public eye a year later in 1988 and didn't re-appear

== Proposed comeback and death ==
In 1999, he stated that he was "drug-free and working on new material". However his proposed comeback ended, when he died in Los Angeles, California, on January 22, 1999, at the age of 41. He died of unknown causes. He is survived by his widow Lynne Conner-Smith and three children, Kiriandra, Paris and Chance Smith.

== Rape accusation ==
In January 2021, Wendy Williams alleged that Sherrick date raped her in the 1980s. Williams said that after she interviewed Sherrick, he invited her to an album release party and raped her. The event is depicted in her biopic Wendy Williams: The Movie. The character named as the rapist in the movie goes by the moniker of "Rick Tony" and is played by Nykeem Provo.

== Discography ==
=== Albums ===
Year	Album	UK
1987	Sherrick	27

=== Singles ===
Year	Single	Peak chart positions	
Year	Single	UK	US R&B
1987	"Just Call"	23	8
1987	"Let's Be Lovers Tonight"	63	—
1987	"Tell Me What It Is"	—	—
1987	"This Must Be Love"	—	—
1987	"Baby I'm for Real"	110	53
"—" denotes releases that did not chart.
