= Hamilton Bohannon =

American percussionist (1942–2020)

- Also known as: Bohannon
- Born: Hamilton Frederick Bohannon; March 7, 1942; Newnan, Georgia, U.S.
- Died: April 24, 2020 (aged 78) Atlanta, Georgia, U.S.
- Genres: R&B; disco; funk; soul
- Occupations: Musician; drummer; songwriter; record producer
- Instruments: Vocals; drums; percussion
- Years active: 1964–1990
- Labels: Motown; Dakar/Brunswick Records; Mercury Records

Hamilton Frederick Bohannon (March 7, 1942 – April 24, 2020), also credited mononymously as Bohannon, was an American drummer, percussionist, bandleader, songwriter, arranger, and record producer who was a leading figure in 1970s disco and funk music. He worked with Marvin Gaye, Stevie Wonder, the Temptations, Wah Wah Watson, Ray Parker Jr., the Counts and Carolyn Crawford.

== Life and career ==
He was born in Newnan, Georgia, and learned the drums at school. He began playing in local bands, one of which featured guitarist Jimi Hendrix, before graduating from Clark College with a degree in music and secondary education. After a brief period as a schoolteacher, he was recruited in 1964 as drummer in 13-year-old Stevie Wonder's touring band. He moved to Detroit in 1967, where he was employed by Motown as the leader and arranger of Bohannon & The Motown Sound, who provided backing for many of the label's top acts on tour, including Marvin Gaye, Stevie Wonder, the Temptations, Diana Ross and the Supremes, the Four Tops and others.

When Motown moved from Detroit to Los Angeles, Bohannon stayed behind to form his own ensemble, featuring members of local band The Fabulous Counts and including such musicians as Ray Parker Jr. and Dennis Coffey. He signed in 1972 with the Dakar label run by producer Carl Davis, and released his debut album Stop & Go in early 1973. This was followed by five more albums for the label over the next two years, on which he "perfected his formula of heavy, thudding bass accents and aggressive rhythms". Although several of his tracks were club hits, he had limited chart success. His first hit single, in 1974, was "South African Man", which reached No. 78 on the Billboard R&B chart, but had more success in the UK, where it reached No. 22 on the UK Singles Chart. This was followed up in 1975 by "Foot Stompin Music" – his only record to reach the US Billboard Hot 100 – and "Disco Stomp", his biggest hit in the UK where it reached No. 6, and was later cited by Johnny Marr as a major influence on the Smiths’ song “How Soon Is Now?”

In 1976, Bohannon signed with Mercury Records and two years later had one of his biggest successes with "Let’s Start the Dance", which reached No. 9 on the R&B chart and No. 7 on the disco chart. "Let's Start the Dance" featured singer Carolyn Crawford, whose subsequent albums Bohannon went on to produce. In 1981, he released a new mix of "Let's Start the Dance" called "Let's Start II Dance (Rap Version)", featuring rap by Dr. Perri Johnson, a legendary Philadelphia R&B DJ. It was successful, peaking at #41 on the R&B charts and #49 on the UK Singles chart. In 1980, he established Phase II Records, and continued to have minor hits on the R&B chart for the next three years, using new vocalists Liz Lands and Altrinna Grayson. He signed with MCA Records in 1984 and released several more albums. His last album, It's Time to Jam, was issued on the South Bound label in 1990.

Much of his music has been widely sampled, most notably on Chicago DJ/producer Paul Johnson's 1999 hit "Get Get Down" which heavily sampled Bohannon's "Me and the Gang". Other musicians who have used samples of his music include Jay Z, Digable Planets, and Snoop Dogg. His name was also repeatedly invoked in the Tom Tom Club song "Genius of Love". His composition "Ooh!" was included on Mary J. Blige's album Love & Life in 2003.

In later years Bohannon produced a new singer, Governor, on Atlantic Records, as well as working on material with his son, Hamilton Bohannon II, and publishing an audiobook memoir of his early years in the music business, Bohannon Speaks from the Beginning.

Bohannon was a devout Christian and dedicated his album Dance Your Ass Off to "God, my master, savior and Jesus Christ". The album also included a disclaimer that "Dance Your Ass Off is not used in the sense of profanity."

In 2017, Peachtree Street in Newnan was renamed Bohannon Drive by the city council in his honor.

He died on April 24, 2020, at his home in Atlanta at the age of 78.

== Discography ==
=== Studio albums ===
Label	Year	Title	Catalog #	Peak chart positions		
Label	Year	Title	Catalog #	US Pop	US R&B	CAN
Dakar Records	1973	Stop & Go	DK 76903	—	—	—
Dakar Records	1974	Keep On Dancin'	DK 76910	—	49	—
Dakar Records	1975	Insides Out	DK 76916	—	28	—
Dakar Records	1975	Bohannon	DK 76917	—	21	—
Dakar Records	1976	Dance Your Ass Off	DK 76919	—	47	—
Dakar Records	1976	Gittin' Off	DK 76921	—	—	—
Mercury Records	1977	Phase II	SRM-1-1159	—	46	—
Mercury Records	1978	On My Way	SRM-1-3710	—	—	—
Mercury Records	1978	Summertime Groove	SRM-1-3728	58	14	2
Mercury Records	1979	Cut Loose	SRM-1-3762	—	34	—
Mercury Records	1979	Too Hot to Hold	SRM-1-3778	—	—	—
Mercury Records	1980	Music in the Air	SRM-1-3813	—	72	—
Phase II Records	1980	One Step Ahead	JW 36867	—	—	—
Phase II Records	1981	Going for Another One	JW 37076	—	—	—
Phase II Records	1981	Alive	JW 37699	—	—	—
Phase II Records	1982	Bohannon Fever	JW 38113	—	—	—
Compleat Records	1983	Make Your Body Move	CPL-1-1003	—	—	—
Compleat Records	1983	The Bohannon Drive	CPL-1-1005	—	—	—
MCA Records	1989	Here Comes Bohannon	MCA 42310	—	—	—
"—" denotes releases that did not chart or were not released in that territory.

=== Compilation albums ===
Label	Year	Title	Catalog #
Southbound	1990	It's Time to Jam	SEW 033

=== Alternative name album releases ===
Label	Year	Title	Catalog #	Original title
Brunswick Records	1974	South African Man	640 050	Keep On Dancin'
Brunswick Records	1975	The Mighty Bohannon	840 073	Bohannon

=== Singles ===
Year	Single	Chart positions			
Year	Single	US Pop	US R&B	CAN D.U.	UK
1973	"Stop & Go"	—	—	—	—
1974	"South African Man"	—	78	—	22
1975	"Foot Stompin Music"	98	39	—	23
1975	"Disco Stomp"	—	62	—	6
1975	"Happy Feeling"	—	—	—	49
1976	"Bohannon's Beat"	—	65	—	58 (Note: Chart position is from the official UK "Breakers List".)
1977	"Bohannon Disco Symphony"	—	67	—	—
1978	"Let's Start the Dance"	101	9	1	56
1979	"Me and the Gang"	—	82	—	—
1979	"Cut Loose"	—	43	—	—
1979	"The Groove Machine"	—	60	—	—
1980	"Baby I'm for Real"	—	54	—	—
1980	"Throw Down the Groove"	—	59	—	—
1980	"Dance, Dance, Dance All Night"	—	76	—	—
1981	"Don't Be Ashame to Call My Name"	—	54	—	—
1981	"Goin' for Another One"	—	91	—	—
1981	"Let's Start II Dance Again" feat. Dr. Perri Johnson	—	41	—	49
1982	"I've Got the Dance Fever"	—	72	—	—
1982	"The Party Train"	—	69	—	—
1983	"Make Your Body Move"	—	63	—	—
1983	"Wake Up"	—	87	—	—
"—" denotes releases that did not chart or were not released in that territory.
