= Down to Love Town =

Single by The Originals

from the album Communique
- B-side: "Just to Be Closer to You"
- Released: 1976
- Recorded: 1975
- Genre: Disco, soul
- Label: Soul (Motown); S 35119F; Tamla Motown (UK); TMG 1038
- Songwriters: Don Daniels, Michael Sutton, Kathy Wakefield
- Producers: Frank Wilson, Michael Sutton

The Originals singles chronology
"Touch" (1975)	"Down to Love Town" (1976)	"Call on Your Six-Million Dollar Man" (1976)

"Down to Love Town" is a 1976 disco single by The Originals, a Motown group that peaked in popularity in the late 1960s and early 1970s. Although the single reached the #1 spot on the disco/dance chart for one week, it hit #93 on the Soul Charts (where The Originals had previously found their success) but had a better showing on the Hot 100, peaking at #47. The song was written by Don Daniels, Michael B. Sutton and Kathy Wakefield. It was originally a track on their 1976 album, Communique. Following its success as a single, the track became the title track of their 1977 album of the same name., which was their final album for Motown.
