= Do I Love You (Indeed I Do) =

1965 single by Frank Wilson

Single by Frank Wilson
- B-side: "Sweeter As the Days Go By"
- Released: 1965
- Genre: Soul, northern soul
- Length: 2:31
- Label: Motown
- Songwriter: Frank Wilson
- Producers: Hal Davis and Marc Gordon

"Do I Love You (Indeed I Do)" is a song and single by American soul singer Frank Wilson first pressed in 1965 on the Motown subsidiary label Soul. It is Wilson's only Motown single and is a prized item among collectors.

== Record history ==
Approximately 250 demo 45s of the song were pressed in 1965 and scheduled for release on 23 December 1965. Owing to a combination of Wilson deciding that he would rather focus on producing and Motown's Berry Gordy's lukewarm reception of the vocals and wish to prevent his producers from having a successful recording career, the demos were destroyed. At least two, and maybe as many as five, copies survived, one of which fetched £25,742 in April 2009. One is rumoured to be owned by Berry Gordy. Due to its scarcity it remains one of the most collectable discs especially by followers of Northern soul. Owing to the demand caused by it being played at the famous English Northern soul nightclub, Wigan Casino, it was first officially released in the UK in 1979 on the Tamla-Motown label, and again in 2004 with a version of the same song by Chris Clark on the B-side.

On CD, the mono Frank Wilson version was issued on The Complete Motown Singles, Volume 5: 1965 (Hip-O Select), while the stereo version appears on the British compilation This Is Northern Soul: The Motown Sound Volume 1 (Motown). The Chris Clark version (in an alternate mono mix) was issued on the British "A Cellarful of Motown!", the first volume of four double discs documenting unreleased Motown songs.

== Bruce Springsteen version ==
"Do I Love You (Indeed I Do)"

Single by Bruce Springsteen

from the album Only the Strong Survive
- Released: 2022
- Studio: Thrill Hill Recording, New Jersey, US
- Genre: Soul
- Length: 2:27
- Label: Columbia
- Songwriter: Frank Wilson
- Producers: Ron Aniello and Bruce Springsteen

Bruce Springsteen singles chronology
"Dustland" (2021)	"Do I Love You (Indeed I Do)" (2022)	"Nightshift" (2022)

Music video
- Do I Love You (Indeed I Do) on Youtube.com

Bruce Springsteen, on his 2022 studio album Only the Strong Survive, recorded the song and released it as a single and music video.

== Certifications ==
Certifications for "Do I Love You (Indeed I Do)"
Region	Certification	Certified units/sales
United Kingdom (BPI)	Gold	400,000^{‡}
^{‡} Sales+streaming figures based on certification alone.

== Popular culture ==
- The song has featured in an commercials for KFC, and The Happy Egg Company.
