= Caroline Crawford =

American singer

- Born: Carolyn Crawford; July 19, 1949 (age 77)
- Origin: Detroit, Michigan, U.S.
- Occupation: Singer
- Years active: 1963–present
- Label: Motown

Caroline Crawford (born July 19, 1949) is an American rhythm and blues, pop, soul, and disco singer who recorded as Carolyn Crawford for Motown Records in the early-mid 1960s, and for other labels later in her career.

== Career ==
In 1963, at about age 14, she won a talent contest held by Detroit radio station WCHB, the prize for which was a contract with Motown Records. She recorded three singles for the label, an unsuccessful first release of "Forget About Me" (Motown 1050), followed by "My Smile Is Just a Frown (Turned Upside Down)" (Motown 1064), written by Smokey Robinson. The record reached #39 on the Billboard rhythm and blues chart. She also sang backup vocals for some of the Motown artists. Her final record for Motown, "When Someone's Good to You" (Motown 1070), released in December 1964, failed to chart and her contract was not renewed, although the record later became a favorite among British soul fans.

A few years later, Crawford joined a girl group, Hodges, James, Smith and Crawford, put together in 1972 by William "Mickey" Stevenson. She released two singles with them, "Nobody" and "Let's Pick Up The Pieces", before leaving the group. (The group went on to achieve some success as Hodges, James & Smith). Crawford then joined the group Chapter 8, but left in 1976 to start a solo career; she was replaced in the group by Anita Baker.

In the late 1970s, and through the early 1980s, Crawford was featured vocalist on several of Hamilton Bohannon's singles and six of his albums, including his biggest US single hit "Let's Start the Dance". She also signed a solo contract with Mercury Records (spelling her name as "Caroline"), and released the single "Coming On Strong", which reached # 66 on the R&B chart at the start of 1979. In addition, she released two albums, My Name Is Caroline (1978) and Nice And Soulful (1979), both produced by Bohannon.

In 1989, using the spelling "Carolyn", she joined Ian Levine's Motorcity project and recorded the album Heartaches, including the single "Timeless", which later became a favourite on the UK Northern soul circuit. She was reported to be still performing (as Caroline Crawford) in Detroit clubs in 2007.

More recently, Crawford has also worked as an actress. She voiced the character of Mrs. Lovat in the 2009 stop-motion film Coraline, and appeared in the TV series Leverage.

Several of her earlier recordings, including recordings for Motown which went unreleased at the time, have been included on later compilation albums. Her best known recording, "My Smile Is Just a Frown (Turned Upside Down)", is featured in the UK-Irish drama-documentary Dreams of a Life, released in December 2011.

== Discography ==
=== Motown Singles ===
- "Forget About Me" / "Devil In His Heart" (1963)
- "My Smile Is Just a Frown (Turned Upside Down)" / "I'll Come Running" (1964) R&B: #39
- "When Someone's Good to You" / "My Heart" (1964)

=== Albums ===
- My Name Is Caroline (LP) (1978) (Mercury) (as Caroline Crawford)
- Nice and Soulful (LP) (1979) (Mercury) (as Caroline Crawford)
- Heartaches (1990) (as Carolyn Crawford)
