= San Remo Golden Strings =

The San Remo Golden Strings
- Origin: Detroit, Michigan
- Genres: Orchestra soul
- Years active: 1965 - 1971
- Labels: Ric-Tic, Gordy, Motown

The San Remo Golden Strings were a studio group from Detroit, Michigan. A number of its members also played in the Detroit Symphony Orchestra, while others were members of the Motown backing band, The Funk Brothers. Their albums were released on Ric-Tic, Motown and Gordy labels. They scored two hits in the U.S. in 1965: "Hungry for Love" (U.S. Pop #27, U.S. AC #3) and "I'm Satisfied" (U.S. Pop #89). In 1971, they had some success, as the "San Remo Strings" with "Festival Time", which reached #39 in the UK Singles Chart and was popular on the UK's Northern soul music scene.

== Discography ==
- Hungry for Love (Ric-Tic, 1965) (SEPT 18 CKLG SURVEY Vancouver Canada)
- Hungry for Love (Motown, 1967)
- Swing (Gordy Records, 1968)
- Festival Time (Tamla Motown, 1967) TMG 795
- Anthology-Hungry For Love(2-Lp Set) (Gordy,1973)
