= Frank Wilson (musician) =

American singer-songwriter (1940–2012)

Background information
- Born: Frank Edward Wilson; December 5, 1940; Houston, Texas
- Died: September 27, 2012 (aged 71) Duarte, California
- Genres: Soul, gospel
- Occupations: Songwriter, record producer
- Instrument: Vocals
- Years active: 1965–2012
- Label: Motown Records

Frank Edward Wilson (December 5, 1940 – September 27, 2012) was an American songwriter, singer, and record producer for Motown Records.

== Early life and education ==
Wilson was born on December 5, 1940, in Houston, Texas, to James Wilson and Samanther Gibbs. Wilson attended Southern University in Baton Rouge but only for one year; he had participated in a civil rights protest and lost his scholarship in his sophomore year. While still in his teens, he moved to Los Angeles, California.

== Career ==
In 1963, Berry Gordy asked the producers Hal Davis and Marc Gordon to set up an office of Motown in Los Angeles. Wilson accepted an offer to join the team. In December 1963, "Stevie" by Patrice Holloway (V.I.P. 25001) was the first single released from the West Coast operation and featured Wilson in the songwriting credits. Asked by Gordy to re-locate to Detroit, Wilson went on to write and produce hit records for Brenda Holloway, Marvin Gaye, the Supremes, the Miracles, the Four Tops, the Temptations, Eddie Kendricks, and more. He became particularly important after Holland-Dozier-Holland left the company. Additionally, after leaving Motown, Wilson produced a gold disc earning album by Lenny Williams, former lead singer for Tower of Power, Marilyn McCoo & Billy Davis Jr., former members of the Fifth Dimension, Alton McClain & Destiny, New Birth and the Grammy nominated album, Motown Comes Home.

He also launched his own publishing firms, Traco Music and Specolite Music, Ascap and BMI companies. During the next four years, Wilson recorded, released and published more than 40 copyrighted compositions, including, "It Must Be Love", by Judy Wieder & John Footman, "Stares and Whispers" by Terry McFadden and John Footman, "Star Love" by Judy Wieder and John Footman, and "You Got Me Running" by Judy Wieder and Clay Drayton.

Earlier, Wilson had also tried his hand at being a recording artist himself, recording the single "Do I Love You (Indeed I Do)" for release on the Motown subsidiary label 'Soul.' Supposedly 250 demo 45s were pressed, but by that time Wilson decided he would rather focus on producing and he had the demos trashed. Somehow at least two known copies survived, one of which fetched over £25,000 in May 2009. Because of the scarcity of the original single and the high quality of the music (it was one of the most popular records in the Northern soul movement), it is one of the rarest and most valuable records in history (along with other extremely rare records by such acts as Bessie Smith, Louis Armstrong, and the Five Sharps).

Wilson left Motown in 1976 and became a born again Christian. He became a minister, traveling and writing books with his wife Bunny Wilson, and was also involved in the production of gospel music. In 2004, was awarded an Honorary Doctorate of Divinity from Vision International University in Ramona, California, and founded the New Dawn Christian Village in Los Angeles.

== Books ==
Wilson is the author of The Master Degree-Majoring in Your Marriage and Unmasking the Lone Ranger, a best seller for men. Both were published by Harvest House Publishers. He conducted Unmasking the Lone Ranger and Master's Degree seminars nationally and internationally based upon his books. Wilson has also appeared on numerous television talk shows including, Two on the Town, The Other Half, and The Oprah Winfrey Show.

== Personal life ==
His first marriage was to singer Barbara Jean Dedmon, who died in 1966. His second wife was Bunny Wilson; together they had four daughters including the author, Fawn Weaver. He also had one son from a prior relationship.

Wilson died on September 27, 2012, in Duarte, California, after a long battle with prostate cancer, at the age of 71.

== Discography ==
Frank Wilson performances
Year	Title	Album title	Album type	Notes
1965	Do I Love You (Indeed I Do)	Single	L.P.	Approx. only 250 demo 45s of the song were pressed
1966	Do I Love You (Indeed I Do) / Sweeter As The Days Go By		L.P. 7"	Soul Records
1978	Anatole			
1999	Songs Of Dayspring (album)	Songs Of Dayspring	Audio CD	Gospel album, Ava-Avalon Label Group
2002	"My Sugar Baby"	A Cellarful of Motown! (various artists)	Audio CD	Previously unreleased Motown Records recording, issued on album A Cellarful of Motown! (UK only)
2016	"My Sugar Baby"	Northern Soul All-Nighter (various artists)	Audio CD boxset	On the album Northern Soul All-Nighter, various artists
2016	"I'll Be Satisfied"	One Track Mind! (various artists)	Audio CD	Kent Records UK. Previously Unreleased Motown recording cut in L.A. with the Wrecking Crew.

== Songwriting and song production highlights ==
=== Albums ===
Albums
Year	Album production title	Artist	Notes
1967	The Temptations in a Mellow Mood	The Temptations	
1968	Diana Ross & the Supremes Join The Temptations	Diana Ross & the Supremes and The Temptations	
1970	New Ways but Love Stays	The Supremes	
1971	Touch	The Supremes	
1977	The Two of Us	Marilyn McCoo & Billy Davis Jr.	Frank Wilson as album composer.
1994	Motown Comes Home	Various artists	Motown Record Company

=== Singles ===
Singles
Year	Songwriting title	Artist(s)	Notes
1963	"Stevie"	Patrice Holloway	
1965	"Castles In the Sand"	Stevie Wonder	
1965	"Somebody Needs You"	Ike & Tina Turner	Catalog number Loma 2015
1965	"I'm So Thankful"	Ikettes	
1965	"Do I Love You (Indeed I Do)	Frank Wilson	
1965	"Do I Love You (Indeed I Do)"	Chris Clark	
1966	"Whole Lot Of Shakin' In My Heart (Since I Met You)"	The Miracles	
1966	"It's Easy to Fall in Love With a Guy Like You"	Martha Reeves & the Vandellas	
1967	"Just Look What You've Done"	Brenda Holloway	
1967	"You've Made Me So Very Happy"	Brenda Holloway, later covered by Blood, Sweat & Tears	
1967	"All I Need"	The Temptations	
1967	"I Can't Turn Around"	The Marvelettes	
1967	"Chained"	Marvin Gaye	
1967	"Every Now and Then"	Marvin Gaye	
1968	"All Because I Love You"	The Isley Brothers	
1968	"Love Child"	Diana Ross & the Supremes	
1969	"I'm Gonna Make You Love Me"	Diana Ross & the Supremes and The Temptations	
1969	"I'm Livin' in Shame"	Diana Ross & the Supremes	
1970	"Up the Ladder to the Roof"	The Supremes	
1970	"Everybody's Got The Right To Love"	The Supremes	
1970	"Still Water (Love)"	Four Tops	
1970	"Stoned Love"	The Supremes	
1970	"It's Time to Break Down"	The Supremes	
1970	"Bridge Over Troubled Water"	The Supremes	
1971	"It's the Way Nature Planned It"	Four Tops	
1971	"Nathan Jones"	The Supremes	
1971	"Touch"	The Supremes	Mary Wilson shared vocals with lead singer Jean Terrell
1971	"This Is The Story"	The Supremes	
1971	"Here Comes The Sunrise"	The Supremes	Written by Clifton Davis
1971	"Can I"	Eddie Kendricks	
1972	"If You Let Me"	Eddie Kendricks	
1972	"Girl You Need A Change of Mind"	Eddie Kendricks	
1973	"Love Train"	The Supremes	
1973	"Darling Come Back Home	Eddie Kendricks	
1973	"Keep on Truckin'"	Eddie Kendricks	
1974	"Boogie Down"	Eddie Kendricks	
1975	"Down to Love Town"	The Originals	
1977	"If I Didn't Have You"	Lakeside	
1977	"I'll Be There Knocking"	Lakeside	
1977	"It Must Be Love"	Alton McClain and Destiny	
1977	"Deeper"	New Birth	
1977	"Choosing You"	Lenny Williams	
1977	"Love Magnet"	Freda Payne	
1978	"Cause I Love You"	Lenny Williams	
1978	"Stares and Whispers"	Renee Geyer	
1978	"Be There in the Morning"	Renee Geyer	
1978	"You Got Me Running"	Lenny Williams	
1978	"When I'm Dancing"	Lenny Williams	
2002	"Lights, Camera, Action"	Mr. Cheeks	
2006	"Each Day Gets Better"	John Legend	
2012	"Do I Love You (Indeed I Do)"	Angelica	
