= The Fantastic Four (band) =

Detroit band

- Origin: Detroit, Michigan, United States.
- Genre: R&B/pop/soul
- Years active: 1965–2023
- Labels: Ric-Tic, Motown, Soul, Westbound
- Members: Jerry Brooks; Eddie Hughes; Darryl Nunlee; Ray Ward.
- Past members: James Epps; Leroy Seabrook Jr. J.W.Campbell; Joseph Pruitt; Ernest Newsome; Wallace Childs; Ralph Pruitt; Paul Edward Scott; Cleveland Horne

The Fantastic Four (also known as Sweet James and The Fantastic Four) were a Detroit based soul vocal group, formed in 1965. "Sweet" James Epps, brothers Ralph and Joseph Pruitt, and Wallace "Toby" Childs were the original members. Childs and Ralph Pruitt later departed, and were replaced by Cleveland Horne and Ernest Newsome. The latter was replaced by Paul Edward Scott after their 1975 album Alvin Stone (The Birth and Death of a Gangster).

== Career ==
Their first single on Ric-Tic, "The Whole World Is a Stage," was their only big hit single, peaking at number 6 on the US Billboard R&B chart in 1967. The next release, "You Gave Me Something (And Everything's Alright)," reached number 12 that same year. Motown eventually purchased Ric-Tic, and they had another Top 20 R&B hit with "I Love You Madly," which came out in 1968 and was also issued on Soul. Before the Motown takeover, The Fantastic Four were the Ric-Tic label's biggest-selling act, outselling Edwin Starr in the US. Their songs were regularly played on Detroit/Windsor's 50,000 watt powerhouse station, CKLW (The Big 8). They continued to record for Motown, releasing several singles under its Soul subsidiary label, until 1970, when they went into semi-retirement.

Several years later Armen Boladian persuaded them to sign with his Westbound label. There they enjoyed renewed appeal during the disco era, with some singles that were moderately successful, among them "Alvin Stone (The Birth & Death of a Gangster)" and "I Got to Have Your Love." Motown guitarist Dennis Coffey produced "B.Y.O.F. (Bring Your Own Funk)" in 1979, although they did not have much success with it. The song did become their only entry in the UK Singles Chart, peaking at number 62 in February 1979.

The Fantastic Four remained active and released Working on a Building of Love in 1990 for the UK's Motorcity label. The group's only Motown album, Best of The Fantastic Four, was released on CD by Motown in the early 1990s. It was a compilation of the group's Ric-Tic hit singles, prior to Motown's takeover of that label, and now is a highly sought-after collector's item. In November 2013, Motown Records and Universal Music re-released the CD Best of The Fantastic Four, featuring the original tracks, which were remastered for the release. In 2015, Ace Records released The Lost Motown Album, on its Kent Soul label, including the LP that Motown had prepared for release (entitled How Sweet He Is) and other previously unheard songs.

The Fantastic Four long-time member Cleveland Horne suffered a heart attack and died on April 13, 2000.

The group's original lead singer, "Sweet James" Epps (born March 30, 1947, in Detroit, Michigan) also died of a heart attack on September 11, 2000.

Original member Ralph Pruitt (born May 4, 1940, in Detroit, Michigan) died on June 3, 2014, of natural causes. He was 74. Paul Edward Scott (born February 5, 1943) died on April 16, 2017, aged 74.

Before he died, Ralph Pruitt put together a new Fantastic Four consisting of Jerry Brooks, Leroy Seabrooks Jr., J.W. Calvin and Rory Ward.

== Discography ==
=== Selected singles ===
- "Girl Have Pity" / "(I'm Gonna) Live Up to What She Thinks" (1966) (Ric-Tic)
- "Can't Stop Looking for My Baby" / "Just the Lonely" (1966)
- "The Whole World is a Stage"/ "Ain't Love Wonderful" (1967)
- "You Gave Me Something (and Everything's Alright)"/ Love Theme From Romeo And Juliet (I Don't Wanna Live Without You)
- "As Long as I Live (I Live for You)" / "To Share Your Love"
- "Goddess of Love" / "As Long as the Feeling is There"
- "Goddess of Love" / "Love is a Many Splendored Thing"
- "Man in Love" / "No Love Like Your Love" (1968)
- "I've Got to Have You" / "Win or Lose (I'm Going to Love You)"
- "I Love You Madly" / "I Love You Madly (Instrumental)" (1968) (Ric-Tic, Soul)
- "I Feel Like I'm Falling in Love Again" / "Pin Point You Down" (Soul)
- "Just Another Lonely Night" / "Don't Care Why You Want Me (Long as You Want Me)" (1969)
- "On the Brighter Side of a Blue World" / "I'm Gonna Carry On" (1970)
- "I Had This Whole World to Choose From (and I Chose You)" / "If You Need Me, Call Me (and I'll Come Running) (1973) (Eastbound)
- "I'm Falling in Love (I Feel Good All Over)" / "I Believe in Miracles (I Believe in You)"
- "Alvin Stone (The Birth and Death of a Gangster)" / "I Believe in Miracles (I Believe in You)" (1975) (Westbound)
- "Better By The Pound" / "Stuffs And Things"
- "Hideaway" / "They Took the Show on the Road" (1976)
- "They Took the Show on the Road" / "Don't Risk Your Happiness on Foolishness"
- "I Got to Have Your Love" / "Ain't I Been Good to You" (1977)
- "Disco Pool Blues" / "Mixed Up Moods & Attitudes" (1978)
- "Sexy Lady" / "If This is Love"
- "B.Y.O.F. (Bring Your Own Funk)" / "If This is Love"
- "Working on a Building of Love" / "Working on a Building of Love (Motor-Town Dub Mix)" (12-inch) (1990) (Motor City)

=== Albums ===
List of Albums, with selected details
Title	Record label	Album details	Year
(Best of) The Fantastic Four	Soul/Tamla Motown	—	1969
Alvin Stone (The Birth and Death of a Gangster)	Westbound/20th Century	written by co-songwriter, Calvin Colbert	1975
Night People	Westbound	—	1976
Got to Have Your Love	Westbound	—	1977
B.Y.O.F. (Bring Your Own Funk)	Westbound	—	1978
Back in Circulation	Motorcity	—	1992
The Lost Motown Album	Kent	—	2015
