= Stop & Go =

Studio album by Hamilton Bohannon
- Released: 1973
- Recorded: 1973
- Genre: Funk, soul
- Label: Dakar/Brunswick
- Producer: Hamilton Bohannon

Hamilton Bohannon chronology
Stop & Go (1973)	Keep on Dancin (1974)

Professional ratings
Review scores
Source	Rating
The Rolling Stone Record Guide	3/5 stars

Stop & Go is the first studio album by the American musician Hamilton Bohannon. It was recorded and released in 1973 by Dakar/Brunswick Records. Music from the album was sampled on "Cashmere Thoughts", by Jay-Z.

== Track listing ==
1. "The Pimp Walk" - 4:02
2. "Run It On Down Mr. DJ" - 6:43
3. "Save Their Souls" - 4:54
4. "Singing a Song for My Mother" - 6:27
5. "It's Time for Peace" - 2:17
6. "Happiness" - 4:00
7. "The Stop and Go" - 3:34
8. "Getting to the Other Side" - 3:17

== Personnel ==
- Hamilton Bohannon - Drums, percussion
- Ray Parker Jr. - Guitar
- Wah Wah Watson - Guitar
- Eddie Watkins- Bass
- Danny Turner - Flute, tenor saxophone
- Mose Davis - Organ
- Leroy Emmanuel - Guitar, bongos, spoons
- Leslie Bass - Percussion
- Travis Biggs - Violin [electric]
- Kitty Haywood Singers - Vocals
