= Chained (Marvin Gaye song) =

Single by Marvin Gaye

from the album In the Groove/I Heard It Through the Grapevine
- Released: August 20, 1968
- Recorded: February 24; March 7; April 22, 23 & 25; May 2; June 20, 1968
- Genre: Soul
- Length: 2:38
- Label: Tamla
- Songwriter(s): Frank Wilson
- Producer(s): Frank Wilson

Marvin Gaye singles chronology
"Keep On Lovin' Me Honey" (1968)	"Chained" (1968)	"His Eye is on the Sparrow" (1968)

"Chained" is a 1968 single released by soul singer Marvin Gaye. The song peaked at number 32 on the Billboard Top 100 on November 1, 1968.

Cash Box said that it has a "towering dance rhythm and a splendid vocal vector."

== Chart history ==
Chart (1968)	Peak position
U.S. Billboard Hot 100	32
U.S. Billboard Hot R&B Singles	8
