= Ric-Tic Records =

- Founded: 1962
- Founder: Joanne Bratton; Ed Wingate
- Status: Defunct
- Genre: R&B, Soul, Northern Soul
- Country of origin: United States
- Location: Detroit, Michigan

Ric-Tic Records was a record label set up in the 1960s in Detroit, Michigan, United States by Joanne Bratton and Eddie Wingate. Twinned with the Golden World label, Ric-Tic featured many soul music artists and was seen as an early competitor for fellow Detroit label Motown. Motown's owner, Berry Gordy was unhappy with the success of Ric-Tic and in 1968 paid $1 million for the signature of many of the label's artists.

In 2003, it was established that Ric-Tic was named for the deceased son of co-founder Bratton and her then husband, boxer Johnny Bratton. The boy, named Derek and known to his family as Ricky, Ric, or Ric-Tic, died at the age of 11 in 1962.

== Recording artists ==
Many early recordings on the Ric-Tic label by artists such as Freddie Gorman, Edwin Starr, and J. J. Barnes were re-released in the 1970s by Motown to coincide with the popularity of the Northern soul music scene in the UK. The group The Fantastic Four were also signed to the Ric-Tic, and became the label's best-selling act, outselling Edwin Starr in the United States. Much like Starr, they continued to record under Motown when Ric-Tic was absorbed by the record company. The Detroit Emeralds (having just moved to Detroit and added the word "Detroit" to their group name) recorded briefly for Ric-Tic, achieving their first R&B Chart (#22) success with "Show Time", released in 1967. They then joined Westbound Records in 1970.
