= The Originals (group) =

American R&B and soul group

- Origin: Detroit, Michigan, U.S.
- Genres: R&B, soul, disco
- Years active: 1966–1982, 1989–present
- Label: Soul (Motown)
- Members: Hank Dixon; Dillon Gorman; Terrie Dixon; Defrantz Forrest
- Past members: Freddie Gorman; Walter Gaines; Ty Hunter; C. P. Spencer; Joe Stubbs

The Originals, often called "Motown's best-kept secret", were a successful Motown R&B and soul group during the late 1960s and the 1970s, most notable for the hits "Baby I'm for Real", "The Bells", and the disco classic "Down to Love Town". Formed in 1966, the group originally consisted of baritone singer Freddie Gorman, tenor/falsetto Walter Gaines, and tenors C. P. Spencer and Hank Dixon (and briefly Joe Stubbs). Ty Hunter replaced Spencer when he left to go solo in the early 1970s. They had all previously sung in other Detroit groups, Spencer having been an original member of the (Detroit) Spinners and Hunter having sung with the Supremes member Scherrie Payne in the group Glass House. Spencer, Gaines, Hunter, and Dixon (at one time or another) were also members of the Voice Masters.

== History ==
The group found success in the latter half of the 1960s as background singers for recordings by artists such as Jimmy Ruffin's "What Becomes of the Brokenhearted", Stevie Wonder's "For Once in My Life" and "Yester-Me, Yester-You, Yesterday", David Ruffin's "My Whole World Ended (The Moment You Left Me)", Marvin Gaye's "Chained" and "Just to Keep You Satisfied", Edwin Starr's "War" and "25 Miles", and many more. Much like the Andantes, Motown's in-house female backing group, they are on countless Motown recordings but were never credited.

They recorded their own material for Motown but saw only one single release before 1969. A cover of Lead Belly's "Goodnight Irene" was released in 1966, backed with "Need Your Lovin'" (both featuring Joe Stubbs on lead) but failed to chart. They recorded the song "Suspicion" in 1966, but it was never released as a single. Nevertheless, it has become a Northern soul classic. The track has since been featured on many of their compilation albums and many Northern Soul compilations. The group saw the release of two more singles, "We've Got a Way Out of Love" and "Green Grow the Lilacs", which failed to chart, in 1969.

The group found their biggest commercial success under the guidance of Marvin Gaye, who co-wrote and produced two of the group's hit singles, the doo-wop influenced ballads "Baby, I'm for Real" and "The Bells". The former was such a hit that the group's debut album, 1969's Green Grow the Lilacs, was soon reissued as Baby, I'm for Real. The latter disc, from 1970s Portrait of the Originals, sold more than one million copies and received a gold disc awarded by the R.I.A.A. Both songs became seminal soul music recordings, and both have since been covered: 1990s R&B group After 7 re-recorded "Baby, I'm for Real" and made it a hit again in 1992, while another 1990s R&B group, Color Me Badd, re-recorded "The Bells" for one of their albums.

The release of their singles remained constant throughout the early 1970s, although chartings proved lower and more sporadic. The year 1970 saw two album releases and four singles, all of which were top 20 R&B Hits. Ballads like "We Can Make It, Baby" and "God Bless Whoever Sent You", both from Naturally Together, continued the group's hit-making streak. "Don't Stop Now", an uptempo number produced by Smokey Robinson, also became popular, despite not being released as a single.

Chart appearances subsequently became less frequent, with only two appearances on any US charts between 1971 and 1975. In this time the group went through changes in personnel and style, with C.P. Spencer leaving in 1972 and being replaced by former the Glass House member Ty Hunter (July 14, 1940 – February 24, 1981). 1974's Game Called Love saw them experimenting with a more country sound (surprisingly the title track was written and produced by Stevie Wonder) and 1975's California Sunset was an album of modern soul written and produced entirely by Lamont Dozier. Communique from 1976 marked the group's first foray into disco, expanded on with 1977's Down to Love Town. In total the group released some eight albums during their tenure at Motown.

Although the group went on to have more modest success in both the soul and disco fields near the end of the decade, including "Down to Love Town", a No. 1 dance chart hit, and their early hit songs. The group had left Motown in 1977, releasing two albums for Columbia and their final album for the independent label Phase II. Spencer returned briefly in the late 1970s, but after the death of Ty Hunter, on February 24, 1981, who died of lung cancer, the group ceased recording and disbanded the following year. They later reunited and recorded for Ian Levine's Motorcity Records; the group recorded several songs together including "Take the Only Way Out" which was scheduled for a single release, and individual members (including former member Joe Stubbs) also made some solo recordings. The group duetted with former Motown labelmates the Supremes for one single, "Back by Popular Demand" in 1991. Freddie Gorman also released a handful of solo singles in the 1980s and later released a solo CD (as Freddi G) entitled It's All About Love (1997).

Joe Stubbs, brother of Four Tops lead Levi Stubbs, died on February 5, 1998. He had been with the group for about six months in 1966, as well a member of the Falcons, the Contours, and 100 Proof (Aged In Soul). C. P. Spencer died on October 20, 2004, and the group's spokesman, Freddie Gorman, followed on June 13, 2006. Walter Gaines died January 17, 2012, after a long illness. Dixon is now the only surviving, and active, founding member of the original group.

== Reformation ==
Following the death of Freddie Gorman in 2006, longtime member Hank Dixon and Hank's daughter Terrie Dixon reformed the Originals as a live touring act, with Freddie's son songwriter and producer Dillon F. Gorman, plus the son of Gene Chandler, Defrantz Forrest, to complete the line-up.

== Discography ==
=== Studio albums ===
Year	Album	Chart positions		Record label
Year	Album	US	US R&B	Record label
1969	Green Grow the Lilacs ^{[A]}	174	18	Soul
1970	Portrait of the Originals	198	47	Soul
1970	Naturally Together	—	44	Soul
1972	Def·i·ni·tions	—	—	Soul
1974	Game Called Love	—	—	Soul
1975	California Sunset	—	51	Motown
1976	Communique	—	—	Soul
1977	Down to Love Town	—	—	Soul
1978	Another Time, Another Place	—	—	Fantasy
1979	Come Away with Me	—	—	Fantasy
1981	Yesterday and Today	—	—	Phase II
"—" denotes releases that did not chart.

- ^{A} Album was later reissued as Baby, I'm for Real

=== Compilation albums ===
Year	Album	Chart positions		Record label
Year	Album	US	US R&B	Record label
1990	Baby, I'm for Real	—	—	Motown
1999	The Very Best of the Originals	—	—	Motown
2002	The Essential Collection	—	—	Spectrum
"—" denotes releases that did not chart.

=== Singles ===
Year	Single (A-side, B-side) Both sides from same album except where indicated	Peak chart positions			Album
Year	Single (A-side, B-side) Both sides from same album except where indicated	US	US R&B	US Dance	Album
1967	"Good Night Irene" b/w "Need Your Lovin' (Want You Back)"	—	—	—	Non-album tracks
1969	"We've Got a Way Out Love" b/w "You're the One"	—	—	—	Green Grow the Lilacs
1969	"Green Grow the Lilacs" b/w "You're the One"	—	—	—	Green Grow the Lilacs
1969	"Baby, I'm for Real" b/w "Moment of Truth"	14	1	—	Green Grow the Lilacs
1970	"The Bells" b/w "I'll Wait for You"	12	4	—	Portrait of the Originals
1970	"We Can Make It Baby" /	74	20	—	Naturally Together
1970	"I Like Your Style"	—	20	—	Portrait of the Originals
1970	"God Bless Whoever Sent You" b/w "Desperate Young Man" (non-album single)	53	14	—	Naturally Together
1971	"Keep Me" b/w "A Man Without Love" (from Naturally Together)	—	—	—	Definitions
1972	"I'm Someone Who Cares" b/w "Once I Have You (I Will Never Let You Go)" (from Naturally Together)	113	—	—	Definitions
1973	"Be My Love" b/w "Endlessly Love"	—	—	—	Game Called Love
1973	"There's a Chance When You Love You'll Lose" b/w "First Lady (Sweet Mother's Love)"	—	—	—	Non-album tracks
1974	"Supernatural Voodoo Woman" (Part 1) b/w Part 2 (Non-album track)	—	—	—	Game Called Love
1974	"Game Called Love" b/w "Ooh You (Put a Crush on Me)"	—	—	—	Game Called Love
1974	"You're My Only World" b/w "So Near (And Yet So Far)"	—	—	—	Game Called Love
1975	"Good Lovin' Is Just a Dime Away" b/w "Nothing Can Take the Place (Of Your Love)"	—	53	—	California Sunset
1975	"Fifty Years" b/w "Financial Affair"; Unreleased	—	—	—	California Sunset
1975	"Everybody's Got to Do Something" b/w Instrumental version of A-side	—	—	—	Communique
1976	"Touch" b/w "Ooh You (Put a Crush on Me)" (from Game of Love)	—	—	—	Communique
1976	"Down To Love Town" b/w "Just to Be Closer to You"	47	93	1	Communique
1977	"Call on Your Six-Million Dollar Man" b/w "Mother Nature's Best"	—	—	6	Down to Love Town
1978	"Temporarily Out of Order" b/w "It's Alright"	—	—	—	Another Time, Another Place
1979	"Blue Moon" b/w "Ladies (We Need You)" (from Another Time, Another Place)	—	—	—	Come Away with Me
1979	"J-E-A-L-O-U-S (Means I Love You)" b/w "Jezebel (You Got Me Under Your Spell)"	—	—	—	Come Away with Me
1981	Medley: "Waitin' on a Letter"/"Mr. Postman" b/w "The Magic Is You"	—	74	—	Yesterday and Today
1981	"The Magic Is You" b/w "Let Me Dance"	—	—	—	Yesterday and Today
1982	"Baby, I'm for Real - '82" b/w "The Magic Is You"	—	—	—	Yesterday and Today
"—" denotes releases that did not chart.

=== As background vocalists ===
- 1966: "What Becomes of the Brokenhearted" (Jimmy Ruffin; Soul)
- 1966: "A Place In The Sun" (Stevie Wonder; Tamla)
- 1968: "Twenty-Five Miles" (Edwin Starr; Gordy)
- 1968: "Does Your Mama Know About Me" (Bobby Taylor and the Vancouvers; Gordy)
- 1968: "Malinda" (Bobby Taylor and the Vancouvers; Gordy)
- 1968: "For Once in My Life" (Stevie Wonder; Tamla)
- 1968: "Chained" (Marvin Gaye; Tamla)
- 1969: "Yester-Me, Yester-You, Yesterday" (Stevie Wonder; Tamla)
- 1969: "My Whole World Ended (The Moment You Left Me)" (David Ruffin; Motown)
- 1969: "What Does It Take (To Win Your Love)" (Jr. Walker; Soul)
- 1970: "War" (Edwin Star; Gordy)
- 1973: "Just to Keep You Satisfied" (from the album "Let's Get It On"; Marvin Gaye; Tamla)

== See also ==
- List of number-one dance hits (United States)
- List of artists who reached number one on the US Dance chart
