= C. P. Spencer =

American musical artist (1938–2004)

- Born: Crathman Plato Spencer; January 13, 1938
- Origin: Detroit, Michigan, U.S.
- Died: October 20, 2004 (aged 66)
- Genres: R&B; soul
- Occupations: Singer; songwriter; musician; record producer
- Years active: 1953–2004
- Labels: Motown; Fantasy; Motorcity

Crathman Plato Spencer (January 13, 1938 – October 20, 2004) was an American musician, singer, songwriter, and record producer for the Motown label in the late 1960s and early 1970s. He was a native of Detroit, Michigan. Best known for being a member of the Motown quartet The Originals. He was also an original member of both The Spinners and The Voice Masters.

C. P. Spencer died from a heart attack on October 20, 2004. As of April 2013, Originals' Hank Dixon is now the only surviving, and active, founding member of that original group; with the Spinners' Henry Fambrough having been the last founding member of that group until his death in February 2024. Dixon is also the only surviving member of the Voice Masters.
