= Golden World Records =

American record label

Golden World Records was an American record label owned by Eddie Wingate and Joanne Bratton (née Jackson, former wife of boxing champion Johnny Bratton). The recording studio was located in Detroit, Michigan, United States. The studio's national hits included "Oh How Happy" by Shades of Blue and "(Just Like) Romeo and Juliet" by The Reflections. The early, pre-Motown songs of Edwin Starr, such as "Agent Double-O-Soul", were recorded at the Golden World studio.

Golden World Records operated from 1962 to 1968.

The label and its subsidiaries were purchased by Berry Gordy in 1966 and folded into the Motown Record Corporation. The Golden World studio became Motown's "Studio B", working in support of the original Motown recording studio (Studio A) at Hitsville USA. Before its purchase by Gordy, the studio's recordings often included moonlighting Motown back-up musicians, including James Jamerson on bass and George McGregor on percussion.

The famous clock that hung in Golden World Records is currently owned by Melodies and Memories in Eastpointe, Michigan, and is on display there. A restored old Steinway piano that Motown inherited from Golden World is now on display at the Motown Museum.

== Discography ==
=== Singles ===
| 1 | Willie Kendrick | "Stop This Train" "Fine As Wine" | Nov 1963 |
| 2 | Sue Perrin | "Candy Store Man" "Recipe Of Love" | Feb 1964 |
| 3 | | No release | Mar 1964 |
| 4; 5 | Adorables | "Deep Freeze" "Daddy Please" | Mar 1964 |
| 6; 7 | Patti Gilson | "Pulling Petals (From A Daisy)" "Don't You Tell A Lie" | Mar 1964 |
| 8/9 | The Reflections | "Can't You Tell By The Look In My Eyes" "(Just Like) Romeo And Juliet" | Mar 1964 |
| 10 | Adorables | "Be" "School's All Over" | May 1964 |
| 11 | Elliott Baron | "Man To Man" "The Spare Rib" | May 1964 |
| 12 | The Reflections | "Like Columbus Did" "Lonely Girl" | Jun 1964 |
| 13 | | No release | Jun 1964 |
| 14 | Manhattans | "Just A Little Loving" "Beautiful Brown Eyes" | Jul 1964 |
| 15 | The Reflections | "Talkin' Bout My Girl" "Oowee Now Now" | Aug 1964 |
| 16 | The Reflections | "(I'm A) Henpecked Guy" "Don't Do That To Me" | Sep 1964 |
| 17 | Debonaires | "A Little Too Long" "Please Don't Say We're Through" | Oct 1964 |
| 18 | Juanita Williams | "Baby Boy" "You Knew What You Was Gettin'" | Sep 1964 |
| 19 | The Reflections | "You're My Baby (And Don't You Forget It)" "Shabby Little Hut" | Nov 1964 |
| 20 | Reflections | "Poor Man's Son" "Comin' At You" | Feb 1965 |
| 21 | Barbara Mercer | "Hey!!" "Can't Stop Loving You Baby" | Jul 1965 |
| 22 | The Reflections | "Wheelin' & Dealin'" "Deborah Ann" | Jun 1965 |
| 23 | Carl Carlton | "Nothin' No Sweeter Than Love" "I Love True Love" | Jul 1965 |
| 24 | The Reflections | "Out Of The Picture" "June Bride" | Jul 1965 |
| 25 | The Adorables | "Ooh Boy!" "Devil In His Eyes" | Jul 1965 |
| 26 | Debonaires | "Eenie Meenie Gypsaleenie" "Please Don't Say We're Through" | Aug 1965 |
| 27 | Barbara Mercer | "The Things We Do Together" "Hungry For Love (Instrumental)" | Sep 1965 |
| 28 | Barbara Mercer | "Doin' Things Together With You" "Nobody Loves You Like Me" | Sep 1965 |
| 29 | The Reflections | "Girl In The Candy Store" "Your Kind Of Love" | Sep 1965 |
| 30 | | No release | Sep 1965 |
| 31 | Sunliners | "The Swingin' Kind" "All Alone" | Nov 1965 |
| 32 | Gino Parks | "My Sophisticated Lady" "Talkin' About My Baby" | Jan 1966 |
| 33 | Rose Batiste | "Sweetheart Darling" "That's What He Told Me" | Jan 1966 |
| 34 | | No release | Feb 1966 |
| 35 | | No release | Feb 1966 |
| 36 | Holidays | "I'll Love You Forever" "Makin' Up Time" | Mar 1966 |
| 37 | Larry Knight & The Upsetters | "Everything's Gone Wrong" "Hurt Me" | May 1966 |
| 38 | Debonaires | "Big Time Fun" "How's Your New Love Treating You?" | Jun 1966 |
| 39 | | No release | Jun 1966 |
| 40 | Tamiko Jones | "I'm Spellbound" "Am I Glad Now" | Jul 1966 |
| 41 | Tony Michaels (Tony Micale of The Reflections) | "Picture Me & You" "I Love The Life I Live (And Live The Life I Love)" | Aug 1966 |
| 42 | Pat Lewis | "Let's Go Together" "Can't Shake It Loose" | Aug 1966 |
| 43 | Theresa Lindsey | "Daddy-O" "I'll Bet You" | Sep 1966 |
| 44 | Debonaires | "C.O.D. (Collect On Delivery)" "How's Your New Love Treating You?" | Oct 1966 |
| 45 | Dickie & The Ebb Tides | "One Boy One Girl" "I've Got A Shadow" | Oct 1966 |
| 46 | Parliaments | "That Was My Girl" "Heart Trouble" | Nov 1966 |
| 47 | Holidays | "No Greater Love" "Watch Out Girl" | Dec 1966 |
| 115 | Modern Times | "Stompin' Crazy Legg" "Happy Man" | Mar 1973 |

=== Albums ===
Only one album was released on the Golden World label:

- (Just Like) Romeo & Juliet—The Reflections—GWLPM-300—1964

== See also ==
- List of record labels
