= Gordy family =

American family of businesspeople and music industry executives

Gordy
- Current region: Detroit, Michigan, U.S. Los Angeles, California, U.S.
- Origin: Georgia, U.S.
- Members: Berry Gordy; Esther Gordy Edwards; Anna Gordy Gaye; Gwen Gordy Fuqua; Robert Gordy; Kerry Gordy; Kennedy William Gordy; Rhonda Ross Kendrick; Stefan Kendal Gordy; Denise Gordy; Bianca Lawson; Skyler Austen Gordy; Kamille Gordy
- Connected families: Bristol; Brown; Bullock; Carter; Cash; Fuqua; Gaye; Jackson; Kendrick; Knowles; Lawson; Ross; Wakefield
- Estate: Motown Historical Museum

The Gordys are an African-American family of businesspeople and music industry executives. They were born to Georgia-reared parents Berry "Pops" Gordy Sr. (born Berry Gordy II) and Bertha (née Fuller) Gordy and raised in Detroit, where most of the siblings played a pivotal role in the international acceptance of rhythm and blues music as a crossover phenomenon in the 1960s. The accomplishment is attributable to the creation of Motown, a company founded by the seventh-oldest sibling, Berry Gordy Jr. (born Berry Gordy III).

== Origins ==
Berry Gordy I was the son of Georgia slave owner James Thomas Gordy and one of his female slaves, Esther Johnson. In addition, James Gordy had a son, James Jackson Gordy, with his legal wife; as the father of Lillian Gordy Carter, the younger James was the maternal grandfather of former U.S. president Jimmy Carter, making Jimmy and Berry III and his siblings half-second cousins. Berry II was born and raised in Georgia, but later left for Detroit both for job opportunities offered by the booming automotive businesses as well as worries over the racist atmosphere of the American South; in the first twenty years of the 20th century alone there were over 1,500 lynchings, most of them committed by the Ku Klux Klan targeting black men.

== Family members ==
- Berry "Pops" Gordy Sr./II (father) – deceased
- Bertha Fuller Gordy (mother) – deceased
- Fuller Gordy (oldest, sibling #1) – deceased
- Esther Gordy (sibling #2) – deceased
- Anna Ruby Gordy (sibling #3) – deceased
- Loucye Gordy (sibling #4) – deceased
- George Gordy (sibling #5) – deceased
- Gwen Gordy (sibling #6) – deceased
- Berry Gordy Jr./III (sibling #7)
- Robert Gordy (sibling #8) – deceased

== Businesspeople, musicians, recording artists and executives within the family ==
=== Berry and Bertha Gordy ===
As a couple, Berry and Bertha owned several businesses, including a successful painting business that they established, and a construction firm. Berry Sr. (or Berry II) established a Booker T. Washington grocery store in Detroit, while Bertha co-founded the Friendship Mutual Life Insurance Company. Later, Berry Sr. mentored several recording acts for his son's Motown label.

Bertha died in 1975. Berry II died in 1978. A tribute album, "Pops We Love You"...The Album, and single, called "Pops, We Love You," were released later that year in his memory.

=== Fuller Berry Gordy ===
The eldest Gordy child, Fuller B. Gordy (September 9, 1918 – November 9, 1991), born in Georgia, was an executive alongside his younger siblings in their brother Berry's Motown music company. Fuller was also a professional in bowling. His daughter Iris was married to singer Johnny Bristol.

=== Esther Gordy Edwards ===
The eldest Gordy daughter, Esther (April 25, 1920 – August 24, 2011), born in Georgia, established herself early in business as a political campaigner for her husband, Detroit politician George Edwards. She was in charge of the family's savings fund which they called the "Ber-Berry" Co-op (a combination of the parents names "Bertha" and "Berry"). In 1959, her brother Berry wanted to borrow $1000 from the family savings fund to start a record company. Esther was skeptical, but ultimately Berry did get an $800 loan to start Tamla Records. Esther Gordy Edwards served as head of the art department and was the head of the artist management arm at Motown during the 1960s. Edwards also served as mentor, adviser, and vice president of Motown's main offices from 1961 until 1972, when Berry moved the entire operation to Los Angeles. In 1985, she founded the Motown Historical Museum at the site of the former Hitsville U.S.A. studios, where many of Motown's successful recording artists recorded. Esther died in 2011 at the age of 91.

=== Anna Gordy Gaye ===
Though she is often remembered more for her volatile marriage to Motown legend Marvin Gaye, Anna Ruby Gordy (January 28, 1922 – January 31, 2014), the third and last child born in Georgia prior to the family's move to Detroit, was one of Motown's earliest songwriters, penning several hits mainly for her first (and only) husband. Anna also co-founded a self-named music label (Anna Records) that would establish Motown's records nationally, such as Barrett Strong's "Money (That's What I Want)". In the late 1960s and early 1970s, Anna co-wrote The Originals' biggest hits, "Baby I'm For Real" and "The Bells", alongside Marvin. She also co-wrote "God Is Love" and "Flying High (In the Friendly Sky)" on Marvin's famed What's Going On album. Despite an acrimonious divorce in 1977, Gordy remained friends with Gaye until his 1984 death, after which Anna retreated into seclusion, only coming out briefly to celebrate Marvin's music career by attending ceremonies, including Marvin's 1987 induction to the Rock & Roll Hall of Fame. Anna died in 2014 at the age of 92.

=== Loucye Gordy Wakefield ===
Another astute businesswoman, Loucye (1924 – July 24, 1965) was named head of Jobete Music, Motown's main publishing division created by Berry. Loucye headed the division until her sudden death from brain cancer in 1965. Her youngest brother Robert succeeded her as the publishing company's head. At the time of her death on July 24, 1965, she went by the name Loucye S. Gordy Wakefield.

=== George Gordy ===
George Weldon Gordy Sr. (January 7, 1926 – July 27, 2011) started several short businesses before joining his brother's Motown label in 1960, where he was a co-writer of several songs released by Motown artists and produced some sessions by The Spinners. By his wife Rosemary (who died in 1980), he had six sons and two daughters. He died in his sleep at the age of 85.

=== Gwen Gordy Fuqua ===
Another important member of Motown's growing success was Gwendolyn Gordy (November 26, 1927 – November 8, 1999). Gwen partnered with her brother Berry and then-boyfriend Billy Davis to co-pen several hits for Jackie Wilson in the mid-1950s. In 1959, Gwen, Billy and sister Anna formed Anna Records in Detroit. Anna would be the site where the hit song, "Money (That's What I Want)", then a regional single for Berry's Tamla Records, would get its first national distribution. Two years later, Anna Records was absorbed by Motown. In 1961, Gwen married The Moonglows' Harvey Fuqua and the two presided over the labels Harvey Records and Tri-Phi Records; the latter label represented acts such as The Spinners. By 1964, Gwen joined Motown's staff songwriting team, later writing "Distant Lover" for her brother-in-law, Marvin Gaye, and discovering the disco group High Inergy in 1976. Gwen died of cancer in 1999 at the age of 72.

=== Berry Gordy ===
A former boxer and jazz record store owner, Berry Gordy, Jr. (born November 28, 1929) first got involved with producing and writing R&B songs in 1955. Amongst Gordy's earliest songwriting successes were songs he penned as one-third of the songwriting team behind Jackie Wilson's first legion of solo hits, including "Reet Petite", "To Be Loved" and "Lonely Teardrops". By 1959, Gordy, fed up with not being paid royalties for his work with Wilson and other acts, decided to form a record label. He convinced his sister Esther to lend him $800 from the tuition fund his father had established for him and formed Tamla Records in January of that year. The label didn't become national until later that year after the success of Barrett Strong's "Money (That's What I Want)", and the label changed its name to Motown Records in December. Its first national release was The Miracles' "Way Over There". After 1964, Motown became one of the most successful recording labels in the business and "The Motown Sound", partially cultivated by Gordy, began to dominate popular music and pop culture. Gordy soon developed Motown Industries in 1968, which developed television specials and variety shows. By 1973, Motown had produced more than 100 top ten and number-one singles on various Billboard charts and had become the most successful black business company ever. By founding Motown Records, Gordy became the first African-American owner of a major recording label. He retired from being president of Motown Records in 1973 and from Motown Industries in 1988; he sold Motown's interest for $61 million to MCA Records and Boston Ventures. Gordy retained Motown's music publishing division, including Jobete Music Co., and Motown's film and television production company, Gordy was inducted to the Rock & Roll Hall of Fame for his musical achievements the same year he sold Motown. In September 2019, 2 months before his 90th birthday, Gordy announced his retirement during the Motown 60th anniversary program in Detroit.

=== Robert Gordy ===
Robert Louis Gordy (born July 15, 1931 – October 21, 2022) is best known for playing a cameo in the Diana Ross-starring vehicle Lady Sings the Blues, playing a drug dealer named "Hawk". Also an early songwriter of several songs for the Motown label, Gordy recorded a 1958 novelty hit, titled "Everyone Was There", under the stage name Bob Kayli. He replaced Loucye Gordy as head of Jobete Music Publishing in 1965 after Loucye's death. Gordy is the father of Robert Louis Gordy Jr. He died on October 21, 2022, at the age of 91.

== Music groups formed consisting of family members ==
=== Apollo ===
A quintet formed by Kerry Gordy and his friends. Also in this group was Kerry's half-brother Cliff Liles, a son by Raynoma Mayberry Liles and Charles Liles.

=== LMFAO ===
A duo consisting of Skyler Austen ("Sky Blu") Gordy (born August 23, 1986), grandson of Berry Gordy Jr. and Thelma Coleman through their son Berry Gordy IV and his wife Valerie Robeson, and Stefan Kendal ("Redfoo") Gordy (born September 3, 1975), son of Berry Gordy Jr. and Nancy Leiviska.

== Other family members ==
=== Iris Gordy ===
Iris Gordy (born 1943) served as a vice president at Motown, where she helped launch the careers of DeBarge, Teena Marie, and Rick James. She currently sits on the board of the Rhythm and Blues Foundation. Iris is the daughter of Fuller Gordy.

=== Kerry Gordy ===
Kerry Gordy (known as KG) is the son of Berry Gordy Jr. and his second wife, Raynoma Mayberry. He was a member of the band Apollo, which released an album on Gordy Records in 1979. Later, he worked as a staff writer and producer at Motown under his given name, Kerry Ashby. He was responsible for breaking his brother Rockwell's 1984 smash hit "Somebody's Watching Me." He was the Former Vice President of A&R and Urban Division Vice President at Warner Bros. Records. He co-founded "Siebers Style with Debbie Siebers" in 2004. They struck a deal with BEACHBODY to license her "Debbie Siebers' Slim in 6" weight loss program which grossed an excess of $250 million. He was the co-president of Prince's label, Paisley Park Records, alongside John Dukakis. KG was also Rick James' manager from 1996 until his death in 2004. He is now the CEO of KGIP, Inc., an intellectual property management and consulting firm, which specializes in copyright recapture, sync licensing, and brand revitalization. As of 2021, KG has partnered with Dakia-Global and Dakia-Universal to form Dakia-Gordy, IP., a venture geared toward the revitalization, re-imagination, and re-monetization of existing intellectual properties, as well as the development of new intellectual properties and partnerships through television and film production, experiential musical innovation, and artist development.

=== Rockwell ===
Kennedy William Gordy, known by the stage name Rockwell, is the son of Berry Gordy Jr. and former girlfriend Margaret Norton, Kennedy William Gordy changed his name to Rockwell in 1983 to become a rock star. The singer, who earned his deal with Motown without his father's knowledge, recorded his biggest hit, 1984's "Somebody's Watching Me", which included background vocals by his labelmates Michael Jackson and Jermaine Jackson. The song rose to number-two on the Billboard Hot 100. Rockwell had one more hit, Obscene Phone Caller, and after two more albums, he retired from music in the late 1980s.

=== Rhonda Ross Kendrick ===
Rhonda Ross Kendrick is the daughter of Berry Gordy Jr. and Diana Ross, Rhonda garnered fame as an actress, first in the daytime soap Another World for which she was nominated for a Daytime Emmy and later in films such as The Temptations, where she played Temptations original member Paul Williams' wife. She later embarked on a jazz career, which continues currently.

=== Redfoo ===
Son of Berry Gordy Jr. and Nancy Leiviska, who is white, Stefan Kendal Gordy is better known by his stage name Redfoo. Performing alongside his nephew Skyler Gordy, who himself is known as Sky Blu, he is a singer, rapper and dancer best known as part of the musical duo LMFAO. The two of them created their act in 2006 and released two studio albums.

=== Denise Gordy ===
Denise Gordy is the daughter of George and Rosemary Gordy, sister of Gregory, Patrice and Phillip Gordy (among others), mother of Marvin Gaye III and Bianca Lawson, and grandmother of Marvin IV and Dylan Gaye. Denise appeared in television and theatrical productions throughout the 1970s and 1980s.

=== Bianca Lawson ===
Daughter of Denise Gordy and Richard Lawson, Bianca, like her parents, achieved fame as an actress appearing in numerous television productions and theatrical releases. Acting alongside Rhonda Ross Kendrick, she played Diana Ross in the television miniseries The Temptations and also appeared as "Darla" in the OWN series Queen Sugar.

=== Sky Blu ===
Son of Berry Gordy IV (Berry Gordy's son) and Valerie Robeson, who is white. Skyler Austen Gordy is better known by his stage name Sky Blu. Performing alongside his uncle Stefan Gordy, who himself is known as Redfoo, he is a singer, rapper and dancer best known as part of the musical duo LMFAO. The two of them created their act in 2006 and have since released two studio albums. Sky Blu is also the brother of Mahogany "LOX" Cheyenne Gordy (born October 4, 1994).

== Family ties ==
The Gordys have at a few times been connected to other famous musicians and other notables over the years, mainly through Berry Gordy, either through marriage or relationships:

- Johnny Bristol: married Berry Gordy's niece Iris Gordy
- Marvin Gaye: married Berry Gordy's sister Anna Gordy in 1962; divorced in 1977
- Richard Lawson: married Berry Gordy's niece Denise Gordy in 1978, divorced in 1989; he later married and divorced Tina Knowles, who is the mother of Beyoncé and Solange Knowles.
- Harvey Fuqua: married sister Gwen Gordy in 1961; divorced in 1968
- Jermaine Jackson: married Berry Gordy's daughter Hazel Gordy in 1973; divorced in 1988
- Raynoma Mayberry Liles: married to Berry Gordy from 1960 to 1964
- Diana Ross: dated Berry Gordy between 1965 and 1970
- Rodney Kendrick: married to Berry Gordy and Diana Ross's daughter Rhonda Ross Kendrick since 1996
- Bessie Lillian Gordy, mother of former United States president Jimmy Carter: She was a biological half first-cousin of Berry Gordy Sr.

== Philanthropy ==
In 2019, Berry Gordy donated $4 million towards the expansion of the Motown Museum in Detroit, helping to fund the creation of a performance theatre and interactive spaces. This is considered as Gordy's most significant financial contribution to Detroit since 1972, when he relocated Motown Records to Los Angeles.
