= The Soulful Moods of Marvin Gaye =

Studio album by Marvin Gaye
- Released: June 8, 1961
- Genre: Jazz; traditional pop; R&B
- Length: 33:04
- Label: Tamla
- Producer: Berry Gordy

Marvin Gaye chronology
The Soulful Moods of Marvin Gaye (1961)	That Stubborn Kinda Fellow (1962)

Singles from The Soulful Moods of Marvin Gaye
- 1. "Let Your Conscience Be Your Guide" Released: May 25, 1961

The Soulful Moods of Marvin Gaye is the debut studio album by Marvin Gaye, released in 1961, and the second long-playing album (TM-221) released by Motown. The first was Hi... We're the Miracles (TM-220). It is most notable as the album that caused the first known struggle of Gaye's turbulent tenure with the label.

== Background ==
Between his release from the U.S. Air Force in 1957 and signing with Motown Records's Tamla label in 1961, Marvin Gaye was struggling to find his identity in the music business. A long admirer of different forms of music from early rock 'n' roll, blues, jazz and doo-wop, Gaye sought to mix the styles of Nat King Cole, Billy Eckstine, Little Willie John and Jesse Belvin, first getting involved in groups such as the Marquees, which he joined following his honorable discharge from a tenure in the Air Forces, which soon replaced the original members of Harvey Fuqua's group The Moonglows under the moniker, Harvey and the New Moonglows, with Reese Palmer doing most of the leads though Gaye did take some lead vocal parts, including speaking in the intro and ending of the single, "The Twelve Months of the Year", and sung all lead in the song, "Mama Loochie". Both songs were released on the Chess label in 1959 and during this period the group sung background for notable Chess acts including Chuck Berry on the song "Almost Grown", and Etta James' "Chained to My Rocking Chair".

After living in Chicago for two years and following a tour in Detroit, Fuqua decided to split up the group and take Gaye with him to help get him work in the musically-developing city. Fuqua then signed Gaye to a contract with his Harvey and Tri-Phi Records and also assigned him to work with his then-girlfriend Gwen Gordy's Anna label. Gaye would do drumming work for acts on Tri-Phi and Harvey including, most notably, The Spinners, on their debut hit, "That's What Girls Are Made For".

In December 1960, Gaye introduced himself to Motown CEO Berry Gordy at Motown's annual Christmas party by playing piano and singing "Mr. Sandman". Gordy was impressed with Gaye and later began working out a negotiation deal with Fuqua to sign the young singer to Gordy's Motown empire. Fuqua agreed to sell 50% of his interest in Gaye to Gordy, which led to Gordy presenting Gaye with a lucrative deal, which he signed with the following month. Gaye was then assigned to Motown's Tamla label, for which he'd record with for the next 20 years. In the meantime, Gaye met and fell in love with one of Gordy's sisters, Anna Gordy and the couple would begin dating during the spring of 1961, marrying within a year.

== Recording and release ==
Shortly after Gaye signed to Tamla, the label and the young singer soon clashed with musical direction. While the label was recording R&B music for teenagers, Marvin, who admired Nat King Cole and Ray Charles, wanted to record more "adult" music, including jazz and pop standards. Gaye had noted that Cole and Charles had found bigger success recording more adult music and after seeing that Charles had had success recording jazz music, rather than just R&B, he felt he could do similar. Gaye, who later admitted that growing up, he was told not to dance, also wanted to "sit on a stool and croon" rather than "shake my ass onstage" saying that his voice was what people paid attention to and not his dancing. After much push, Gaye finally was allowed to record an album of jazz standards with a compromise that he'd record a couple of songs with an R&B feel. Recording his vocals in a relaxed tone, Gaye also played drums and piano on the album while Berry Gordy oversaw much of the album's production. Anna Gordy was another collaborator, co-writing the R&B song "Never Let You Go (Sha-Lu-Bop)" for her boyfriend. The album was recorded over two weeks and was released on June 8, 1961. Before the release of his first single, the Berry Gordy-composed ballad "Let Your Conscience Be Your Guide", Gaye added an extra 'e' to his last name, to look "more professional".

The album was not given much attention upon its release. "Let Your Conscience Be Your Guide" failed to become a major hit, though it was a regional hit in the Midwest and on the West Coast. The label released two more singles from the album, which featured Gaye still singing in a smooth tenor. His style soon changed to include gospel inflections, which helped to bring him success after he released his first hit, "Stubborn Kind of Fellow", in 1962. Motown Records, at the time of this album's release, was still a fledgling operation, with only the Miracles, the Marvelettes, and Mary Wells as successful acts. Gaye's jazz ambitions continued after the album's release and throughout the 1960s. He recorded three more albums featuring jazz covers, none of which resonated well with audiences used to the singer's grittier R&B work during the sixties.

== Track listing ==
No.	Title	Writer(s)	Length
1.	"(I'm Afraid) The Masquerade Is Over"	Herbert Magidson, Allie Wrubel	5:08
2.	"My Funny Valentine"	Richard Rodgers, Lorenz Hart	3:26
3.	"Witchcraft"	Cy Coleman, Carolyn Leigh	2:22
4.	"Easy Living"	Ralph Rainger, Leo Robin	3:05
5.	"How Deep Is the Ocean (How High Is the Sky)"	Irving Berlin	3:08
6.	"Love for Sale"	Cole Porter	2:54
7.	"Always"	Irving Berlin	2:58
8.	"How High the Moon"	Nancy Hamilton, Morgan Lewis	2:28
9.	"Let Your Conscience Be Your Guide"	Berry Gordy	3:01
10.	"Never Let You Go"	Harvey Fuqua, Anna Gordy Gaye	2:41
11.	"You Don't Know What Love Is"	Gene DePaul, Don Raye	3:53
