= Esther Gordy Edwards =

American business executive (1920–2011)

- Edwards in 1988
- Born: April 25, 1920; Washington County, Georgia, U.S.
- Died: August 24, 2011 (aged 91); Detroit, Michigan, U.S.
- Burial place: Woodlawn Cemetery
- Other name: Esther Gordy
- Education: Cass Technical High School
- Occupation: Businesswoman
- Relatives: Anna Gordy Gaye (sister); Gwen Gordy Fuqua (sister); Berry Gordy (brother); Robert Gordy (brother)

Esther Gordy Edwards (née Gordy; April 25, 1920 – August 24, 2011) was a staff member and associate of her younger brother Berry Gordy's Motown label during the 1960s. Edwards created the Motown Museum, Hitsville U.S.A., by preserving the label's Detroit studio. She also served as president of the Motown Museum and has been called the "Mother of Motown". Edwards was posthumously inducted into the Michigan Women's Hall of Fame in 2022.

== Biography ==
Esther Gordy Edwards was born to Berry Gordy, Sr. and Bertha Fuller Gordy in Washington County, Georgia. She was the couple's second oldest child and eldest daughter. When she was two years old, her parents moved to Detroit, Michigan. Edwards' younger siblings included sisters Anna, the late Loucye, and Gwen, as well as brothers Fuller, George, Berry and Robert, who was the youngest of the family. Edwards attended Detroit's prestigious Cass Technical High School. She later graduated from Howard University. Esther married Detroit politician George Edwards in 1951. From a previous relationship, she has a son by Robert Theron Bullock named Robert Berry Bullock, and through him has three granddaughters named Robin, Elesha and Gwen and grandson Alejandro Quinn, a Major in the United States Marine Corps.

=== Career ===
Edwards founded the Gordy Printing Company with two of her brothers in the mid-1940s. With her husband, they created the Ber-Berry Co-Op, which was intended to provide loans to family members. Her younger brother Berry reportedly asked for an $800 loan to help start Motown Records in 1959. After Motown became established, Edwards took an active role in management and booking tours, and founded the legendary Motortown Revue in the 1962. While at Motown, Edwards took on a motherly role towards some of the label's younger acts. In the mid-1960s, she served as Motown's vice president and chief executive officer. She was succeeded in this role by Smokey Robinson in 1972. Edwards later served on the board for the Detroit Bank of Commonwealth and the Greater Detroit Chamber of Commerce.

In 1985, Edwards became the director of the Motown Historical Museum (Hitsville U.S.A.) and has since been credited with carefully maintaining the original studios of Motown. Edwards is often described as "the pillar of Motown".

=== Death ===
Esther died surrounded by family and friends, following a long illness, at her Detroit Towers Condominium (located on Jefferson Avenue) home in Detroit on August 24, 2011. She was 91 years old.
