= Gwen Gordy Fuqua =

American songwriter

- Born: Gwendolyn Gordy; November 26, 1927; Detroit, Michigan, U.S.
- Died: November 8, 1999 (aged 71) San Diego, California, U.S.
- Genres: R&B, soul
- Occupations: Songwriter composer businesswoman
- Labels: Anna, Tri-Phi, Harvey, Motown

Gwen Fuqua (born Gwendolyn Gordy; November 26, 1927 – November 8, 1999) was an American businesswoman, songwriter and composer, most notably writing hit songs such as "Lonely Teardrops", "All I Could Do Was Cry" and "Distant Lover". She acquired her full name after marrying Harvey Fuqua and kept the name after their divorce.

== Biography ==
=== Early life and career ===
Gwen Gordy was born to Berry Gordy Sr. and Bertha Ida (née Fuller) Gordy in Detroit, Michigan. She was the youngest of the four Gordy sisters (Esther, Anna and Loucye) and the third youngest of the entire family (brothers Berry and Robert were born after her).

Following graduation from high school, Gwen owned the photo concession at Detroit's popular Flame Show Bar, which helped to make her a celebrity in Detroit's nightlife. By the late 1950s, Gordy had also become a cheerleader for brother Berry's musical efforts. She provided Berry with his first important music business contact when she introduced him to the manager of the club, a white man named Al Green. Green managed music stars like Johnnie Ray and LaVern Baker and he had just signed a new singer from Detroit named Jackie Wilson.

Green also owned a music publishing company and was looking for new material. She had a songwriting partnership with her brother Berry Gordy and Roquel "Billy" Davis, a childhood friend who had connections with Chess Records in Chicago. The partners started out with a bang by writing "Jim Dandy Got Married" for LaVern Baker on the Atlantic label and "All I Could Do Was Cry" for Etta James on Argo, a Chess subsidiary label. By far, however, their greatest early success was writing the first big hits for Jackie Wilson.

Starting with "Reet Petite", Gwen, Berry and Davis penned five consecutive Jackie Wilson hits. "Lonely Teardrops", "That's Why (I Love You So)", "To Be Loved", and "I'll Be Satisfied" all established Wilson as one of rock and roll's hottest new stars. However, Gordy earned small pay during this period of her work with Wilson's label Brunswick.

Although Berry, Gwen, and Roquel had provided five consecutive hits for Jackie Wilson, they had to split the songwriting royalties three ways. To bring in more income, Berry demanded that some of their songs be used for the B sides on Wilson's recordings. After he was turned down by manager Nat Tarnopol, the trio decided to end their association with Jackie.

Gwen Gordy was the first to put the idea of starting a record company into action. She formed a label with Roquel Davis and named the company Anna, after her sister. Davis then used his contacts to make a deal with Chess Records to distribute their new Anna label nationally. Gwen and Roquel both wanted Berry to become a partner with them. However, Berry decided to go out on his own. The label helped to distribute the local Tamla Records single, Barrett Strong's "Money (That's What I Want)", which became a top 40 hit in 1960.

That year, Gordy co-wrote the ballad "All I Could Do Was Cry", which was originally offered to Erma Franklin (Aretha's sister), who almost signed with Anna Records but was rebuffed by her father, C. L. Franklin. The song eventually was sold by Chess Records who recorded the song with Etta James. Shortly after meeting Harvey Fuqua, they founded the labels Harvey Records and Tri-Phi Records, the latter label including The Spinners, who recorded their first hit with the Gordy/Fuqua composition, "That's What Girls Are Made For".

In 1961, Motown absorbed Anna Records, signing Marvin Gaye in the process. The Harvey and Tri-Phi labels were absorbed by Motown two years later after that and Gordy and Fuqua accepted staff jobs with Motown, with Gordy handling business affairs, while Fuqua became a staff writer and producer. Alongside sister Anna, she co-headed Motown's Artist Development course and by the mid-1960s was managing acts such as the Spinners, Shorty Long, Junior Walker & the All Stars and Tammi Terrell, who signed to Motown in 1965. Gordy convinced Motown to allow Terrell to perform duets with Gaye.

In 1973, Gordy had a hand in adding lyrics to Marvin Gaye's composition, "Distant Lover", which became a hit single a year later after Motown released a live recording of the song. In 1977, Gordy founded Gwen Glenn Productions and produced for Motown acts such as High Inergy before retiring from the music business in the early 1980s.

== Personal life ==
Gordy dated fellow composer Billy Davis for a number of years. However, the relationship imploded after Gordy got involved with Harvey Fuqua. Gordy and Fuqua married in 1961, and Gordy was known afterwards as Gwen Gordy Fuqua for the duration of her life. She and Fuqua divorced in 1968. After most of the Spinners left Motown for Atlantic Records in 1972, she struck up a romance with ex-Spinners bandmate G.C. Cameron, managed his career, and later married him.

The couple separated in the late 1970s after Cameron left Motown. Her production company Gwen Glenn was named after Gwen's son Glenn Gordy. She moved to California in the early 1970s, where she remained until her death and lived comfortably off royalties after her career ended in the early 1980s.

=== Death ===
Gwen Gordy succumbed to cancer at her home in San Diego, California, on November 8, 1999, at the age of 71.
