= Anna Records =

Defunct record label

Anna Records was a short-lived record label, known as a forerunner of Motown, founded by sisters Anna and Gwen Gordy and Roquel Billy Davis in 1959 and located in Detroit, Michigan. Gwen Gordy and Davis had written hit songs for Jackie Wilson and Etta James prior to founding the label. Anna Records recorded acts like David Ruffin, future lead singer of the Temptations, Joe Tex, Herman Griffin, Johnny Bristol and his partner Jackey Beavers (the original duo behind The Supremes' "Someday We'll Be Together"), and future Motown hit-making songwriter-producer Lamont Dozier (who went by the name Lamont Anthony at the time). They hired future Motown star Marvin Gaye as drummer for the label.

Anna Records is most notable for issuing the first national Motown hit, "Money (That's What I Want)", recorded by singer-songwriter Barrett Strong, which hit number two on the R&B chart in early 1960. The label wasn't so successful afterwards and in 1961 Anna and all its artists were absorbed by Gwen and Anna's brother Berry Gordy into Motown. Gaye, in particular, became a solo artist and signed with the corporation's oldest label Tamla while still serving as a session drummer, and Ruffin later joined the Temptations, having signed a separate contract with the Gordy subsidiary just prior to signing with Anna. Ruffin's brother Jimmy also briefly recorded for the label.

The label had national distribution through Chess Records. The label issued no albums.

After the label wound up, Anna Gordy joined Motown's staff writing team and Gwen later separated from Davis, going on to form a partnership with singer Harvey Fuqua, whom she married. The couple later formed Harvey Records and Tri-Phi Records. Both labels were also absorbed by Motown in 1963. Gwen and Harvey later joined the Motown songwriting staff. Davis found success as a staff songwriter for Chess Records shortly after Etta James released his co-composition, "All I Could Do Was Cry".

== Discography ==
=== Singles ===
Year	Month	Title		Artist	Catalogue Number
Year	Month	A-side	B-side	Artist	Catalogue Number
1959	Apr	"Hope and Pray"	"Oop's I'm Sorry"	Voice Masters	Anna A-1101
1959	Apr	"Needed"	"Needed (For Lovers Only)"	Voice Masters	Anna A-1102
1959	Jun	"Hit and Run Away Love"	"Advertising for Love"	Hill Sisters	Anna A-1103
1959	Aug	"Peppermint (You Know What to Do)"	"Never More"	Bob Kayli	Anna A-1104
1959	Oct	"All I Want Is You"	"Take Me Back (I Was Wrong)"	Wreg Tracey	Anna A-1105
1959	Dec	"The Hunch"	"Hot Cross Buns"	Paul Gayten	Anna A-1106
1959	Dec	"Hot Cross Buns"	"The Hunch"	Paul Gayten	Anna A-1107
1960	Feb	"Lonely and Blue"	"Let's Go to a Movie Baby"	Johnny & Jackey	Anna A-1108
1960	Feb	"With Tears in My Eyes"	"I'll Get Along Somehow"	Larry Darnell	Anna A-1109
1960	Feb	"Just for Your Love"	"This Heart of Mine"	Falcons	Anna A-1110
1960	Mar	"Money (That's What I Want)"	"Oh! I Apologize"	Barrett Strong	Anna A-1111
1960	Mar	"Beatnick Beat"	"Scratch Back"	Paul Gayten & his Orchestra	Anna A-1112
1960	May	"I Need You"	"I Got That Feeling"	Letha Jones with The Rivals	Anna A-1113 (first issue)
1960	May	"I Need You"	"Black Clouds"	Letha Jones with The Rivals	Anna A-1113 (second issue)
1960	Jul	"Orphan Boy"	"Everything About You"	Ty Hunter with The Voice Masters	Anna A-1114
1960	May	"Hurry Up and Marry Me"	"Do You Want to See My Baby"	Herman Griffin & The Mello-Dees	Anna A-1115
1960	Jun	"Yes, No, Maybe So"	"You Knows What to Do"	Barrett Strong	Anna A-1116
1960	Jul	"I Feel It"	"So Good"	Ruben Fort	Anna A-1117
1960	Jul	"Blue Moon"	"Don't"	Allen "Bo" Story	Anna A-1118
1960	Aug	"All I Could Do Was Cry Pt. 1"	"All I Could Do Was Cry Pt. 2"	Joe Tex	Anna A-1119
1960	Sep	"Hoy Hoy"	"No One Else But You"	Johnny & Jackey	Anna A-1120
1960	Sep	"The Big Time Spender Part I"	"The Big Time Spender Part II"	Bill Murray & George Copeland	Anna A-1121
1960	Oct	"Tight Skirts & Crazy Sweaters"	"I'm Afraid"	Cap-tans	Anna A-1122
1960	Dec	"Free"	"Everytime"	Ty Hunter & The Voice Masters	Anna A-1123
1961	Jan	"I'll Never Break Your Heart, Pt. 1"	"I'll Never Break Your Heart, Pt. 2"	Joe Tex & The Vibrators	Anna A-1124
1961	Jan	"Popeye (The Sailor Man)"	"Let's Talk It Over"	Lamont Anthony	Anna A-1125 (first issue - withdrawn)
1961	Feb	"Benny the Skinny Man"	"Let's Talk It Over"	Lamont Anthony	Anna A-1125 (second issue)
1960	Dec	"All I Want for Christmas (Is Your Love)"	"Take Me Back (I Was Wrong)"	Wreg Tracey	Anna A-1126
1961	Feb	"I'm In Love"	"One of These Days"	David Ruffin	Anna A-1127
1961	Mar	"Ain't I a Mess"	"Baby You're Right"	Joe Tex	Anna A-1128

== See also ==
- List of record labels
- Motown Records
- Gordy family
