= Heated (Beyoncé song) =

Song by Beyoncé

from the album Renaissance
- Released: July 29, 2022
- Studio: Juicy Juicy; Parkwood West (Los Angeles)
- Genre: Afrobeat; dancehall
- Length: 4:20
- Label: Parkwood; Columbia
- Songwriters: Sean Seaton; Rupert Thomas Jr.; Jahaan Sweet; Matthew Samuels; Oliver Rodigan; Travis Garland; Aviel Calev Hirschfield; Jeremy Reeves; Jonathan Yip; Malcolm McDaniel; Ray Charles McCullough II; Ray Romulus; Aubrey Graham; Ricky Lawson; Clarence Coffee Jr.
- Producers: Beyoncé; Neenyo; Sevn Thomas; Sweet; Boi-1da

Lyric Video
- "Heated" on YouTube

"Heated" is a song recorded by American singer Beyoncé. It is the eleventh track on her seventh studio album, Renaissance (2022), which was released on July 29, 2022, through Parkwood and Columbia.

== Composition and lyrics ==
The song was written by Beyoncé herself with Drake, Neenyo, Sevn Thomas, Jahaan Sweet, Matthew Samuels, Oliver Rodigan,, Ricky Lawson, Clarence Coffee Jr., Jonathan Yip, Travis Garland, Aviel Calev Hirschfield and Malcolm McDaniel. The song contains a sample of "Where to Land", written by Travis Garland, Jonathan Yip, Ray Romulus, Jeremy Reeves and Ray Charles McCullough II and performed by Travis Garland.

Pitchfork writer Julianne Escobedo Shepherd described the song as an "a pulsing afrobeats track". Michaelangelo Matos of The New York Times described as a "neo-dancehall form over a slinky, wood-block-heavy groove". The song also features elements of ballroom music.

"Heated" referred to Beyoncé's "Uncle" Jonny, her gay cousin who introduced her to post-1970s Black ball culture, dance music and club culture, concept of Renaissance. The song was considered a tribute to "Uncle" Jonny, who helped raise her until his death during the AIDS epidemic.

== Controversy ==
The song was met with criticism online for its use of the word "spaz" in its lyrics, which disability advocates said is an ableist slur. Other users online said that "spaz" has a different meaning in African-American English and is synonymous with "freaking out". Beyoncé announced the following day that the word would be removed from the song, with the word soon being replaced with "blast".

== Critical reception ==
The song received positive reviews from music critics in the album reviews. Ranking Renaissance's tracks, Billboard wrote that although Drake's writing influence "looms heavily" over the first half of the track, it "features some of the most important moments" of the record project, with "Beyoncé nails the tongue-in-cheek braggadocio of the ballroom scene with this celebratory ode to her late Uncle Johnny". Rolling Stone ranked the song 42nd on its list of the singer's best songs, describing it as a "propulsive, effervescent riddim" in which "Beyoncé backs herself up with her own rhythmic chants as she unfurls a litany of thoughts".

Select year-end rankings of Heated
| Publication | List | Rank | Ref. |
|---|---|---|---|
| The Hollywood Reporter | The 10 Best Songs of 2022 | 1 | |
| Entertainment Weekly | The 10 Best Songs of 2022 | 2 | |

== Live performance ==
Beyoncé first performed "Heated" in Stockholm, Sweden on the opening night of the Renaissance World Tour, including it on the setlist for the duration of the tour. The robot arms from the "Cozy" performance returned to the stage holding mechanical fans, referring to the line "I gotta fan myself off." Pyrotechnics went off throughout the song.

Beyoncé retained "Heated" for the Cowboy Carter Tour in 2025. It immediately followed "Cuff It" and has her returning to the main stage on a flying, glowing horseshoe. The song is mashed with "Boots on the Ground" by 803Fresh, continuing the connection to fans with the "Where them fans at?" line.

== Charts ==
=== Weekly charts ===
Weekly chart performance for "Heated"
| Chart (2022) | Peak position |
|---|---|
| Canada Hot 100 (Billboard) | 69 |
| Global 200 (Billboard) | 52 |
| South Africa Streaming (TOSAC) | 26 |
| UK Singles (Official Charts) | 68 |
| US Billboard Hot 100 | 51 |
| US Hot R&B/Hip-Hop Songs (Billboard) | 20 |

== Certifications ==
Certifications for "Heated"
| Region | Certification | Certified units/sales |
|---|---|---|
| Brazil (Pro-Música Brasil) | 3× Platinum | 120,000^{‡} |
| Canada (Music Canada) | Gold | 40,000^{‡} |
| United Kingdom (BPI) | Silver | 200,000^{‡} |
| United States (RIAA) | Gold | 500,000^{‡} |
^{‡} Sales+streaming figures based on certification alone.
