= Let Your Conscience Be Your Guide =

Single by Marvin Gaye

from the album The Soulful Moods of Marvin Gaye
- B-side: "Never Let You Go (Sha-Lu Bop)"
- Released: May 25, 1961
- Recorded: Hitsville USA, Detroit, Michigan, 1961
- Genre: Rhythm and blues
- Length: 3:01
- Label: Tamla; T 54041
- Songwriter: Berry Gordy
- Producer: Berry Gordy

Marvin Gaye singles chronology
| "Let Your Conscience Be Your Guide" (1961) | "Sandman" (1962) |

"Let Your Conscience Be Your Guide" is the debut single for singer Marvin Gaye, released as Tamla 54041, in May 1961. It was also the first release off Gaye's debut album, The Soulful Moods of Marvin Gaye, in which most of the material was the singer's failed attempt at making an 'adult' record compared to Motown's younger R&B sound.

== Overview ==
=== Background ===
In 1960, Marvin Gaye moved to Detroit with his mentor Harvey Fuqua, who had first booked him as a co-lead singer of "Harvey & the Moonglows", a splinter version of the popular fifties doo-wop group, the Moonglows. Fuqua and Gaye met up with several members of the Gordy family, and before long both of them were dating the female Gordy members Gwen and Anna respectively. Around that fall, Marvin was introduced to Motown Records CEO Berry Gordy after Gaye walked in during a party at the local Hitsville studios and played around on the piano. Gordy later signed Gaye first as a session drummer for Anna Records and eventually signed him into Motown's Tamla label as an artist. After several arguments over the direction of the album - the headstrong Marvin wanted to record a "Frank Sinatra-styled pop album" while Gordy wanted him to record R&B, the two came to a compromise, while most of Soulful Moods featured covers of jazz songs and Broadway tunes, three of the final songs on the album were produced in a rhythm and blues mode.

=== Song style ===
This song was inspired by a Ray Charles ballad and featured background vocals by The Andantes. During the song Marvin mixes a smooth tenor with a few falsetto whoops.

=== Release ===
Gordy released it with the b-side being the Anna Gordy and Harvey Fuqua-penned "Never Let You Go (Sha-Lu Bop)" in May 1961, a month after Marvin's 22nd birthday. Before its release, however, Marvin sought to begin his solo career with a new name. Inspired by Sam Cooke, Marvin added an "e" to his last name therefore becoming forever known as Marvin Gaye. Despite regional success in Detroit, the song failed to enter either the pop or R&B chart on the national Billboard magazine. Mary Wells later covered the song for her own debut Motown release, Bye Bye Baby I Don't Want to Take a Chance.

== Credits ==
- Lead vocals by Marvin Gaye
- Background vocals by The Andantes
- Instrumentation by The Funk Brothers
- Written and produced by Berry Gordy
