= Matriarch: A Memoir =

2025 memoir by Tina Knowles

- Author: Tina Knowles; Kevin Carr O'Leary
- Audio read by: Tina Knowles
- Language: English
- Subject: Memoir
- Publisher: One World; Dialogue Books (UK)
- Publication date: April 22, 2025
- Media type: Print (hardcover, paperback); Digital; Audiobook
- Pages: 432 (hardcover)
- ISBN: 978-0593597408

Matriarch: A Memoir is a memoir by Tina Knowles, released on April 22, 2025.

== Overview ==
It was written with Kevin Carr O'Leary, and was published by One World and Dialogue Books in the United Kingdom.

The book details Knowles' upbringing in Galveston, Texas and raising her daughters Beyoncé and Solange Knowles.

== Reception ==
The book was a commercial success, as it was a number-one New York Times Best Seller. The book was also chosen as the official selection of Oprah Winfrey's Oprah Book Club for April 2025. Knowles also embarked on a nine-city tour in 2025 to promote the book, moderated by special guests including Michelle Obama.
