= House of Deréon =

Former ready-to-wear fashion line

House of Deréon logo.

House of Deréon was a ready-to-wear fashion line introduced by singer and actress Beyoncé and her mother and then-stylist Tina Knowles. The style and concept was inspired by three generations of women in their family, with the name "Deréon" paying tribute to Beyoncé's maternal grandmother, Agnéz Deréon (mother of Tina Knowles). House of Deréon discontinued its junior line in 2012, and was unofficially discontinued in the following years.

== History ==
=== Launch ===
I grew up in a fabric store. Fortunately, my mother would say: 'Come on let's go to the fabric store,' and she would make all of these beautiful clothes for myself and the other ladies of Destiny's Child, and after so many years my fans said we want to buy these clothes somewhere, so it was a natural thing for us to do this line, and it's so great for us to be able to do it together, number one because we get to spend time together, and two because we have such respect for each others' taste.

— Beyoncé talking about the House of Deréon.

The House of Deréon was introduced on The Oprah Winfrey Show in 2005, and was also featured on The Tyra Banks Show. The clothing mixed hip-hop influences, such as its use of denim, with ultra-feminine flourishes like embroidery and ruffles. In an interview with Ebony magazine, Beyoncé said "I love the clothes from the '70s, my mother's clothes. I love clothes from the '40s, my grandmother's style, so elegant. We wanted to take elements from my grandmother's legacy—the beaded lace, lush colors, fine fabrics—and mix them with clothes from my mother's generation and my generation."

The symbol for House of Deréon was often featured on the back pockets of jeans. Additionally included in the line's design were styles that alluded to Agnéz Deréon's era, such as retro pencil skirts. In 2005, it was reported that Beyoncé had an active role in the House of Deréon's design department, approving and discussing fashion designs and ideas. The brand's junior line, Deréon, was introduced in 2006, with the tag line, "Where the sidewalk and catwalk meet". The Deréon line included casualwear, such as sweatpants and embroidered hooded sweatshirts. In 2008, Tina Knowles designed a House of Deréon collection of vintage-inspired dresses that were made available at Bloomingdale's. The collection was based on the 1950s-style dresses that Beyoncé wore for her role as Etta James in the film Cadillac Records.

=== Advertisement controversy ===
In May 2008, the fashion line released advertisements for its girls line called "The Deréon Girls Collection". The fashion line infuriated critics when the advertisement displayed seven-year-old girls in full makeup and high heels. A poll online on the Washington Post website stated that 62% of the readers believed the advertisements oversexualized young girls.

=== London launch ===
Following her appearance at New York Fashion Week, Beyoncé traveled to London, England, to debut the House of Deréon Autumn/Winter "Global Nomad" collection at Selfridges during London Fashion Week. Celebrities like Chipmunk, Ellie Goulding, Alexandra Burke, and Rita Ora attended the show. Beyoncé appeared wearing a black sequin suit with her mother Tina on stage.

September 17, 2011 marked the official launch in London at Selfridges of House of Deréon International Collection by Beyoncé and Tina Knowles via a fashion show featuring both the Autumn-Winter and Holiday 2011 collections. The House of Deréon fashion collection launch at Selfridges was a global exclusive as the line was previously only available in the United States.

=== Closing ===
In 2012, House of Deréon reduced staff and discontinued its junior line, Deréon. The rest of the line was unofficially discontinued in the following years.
