= Tina Knowles =

American businesswoman and fashion designer (born 1954)

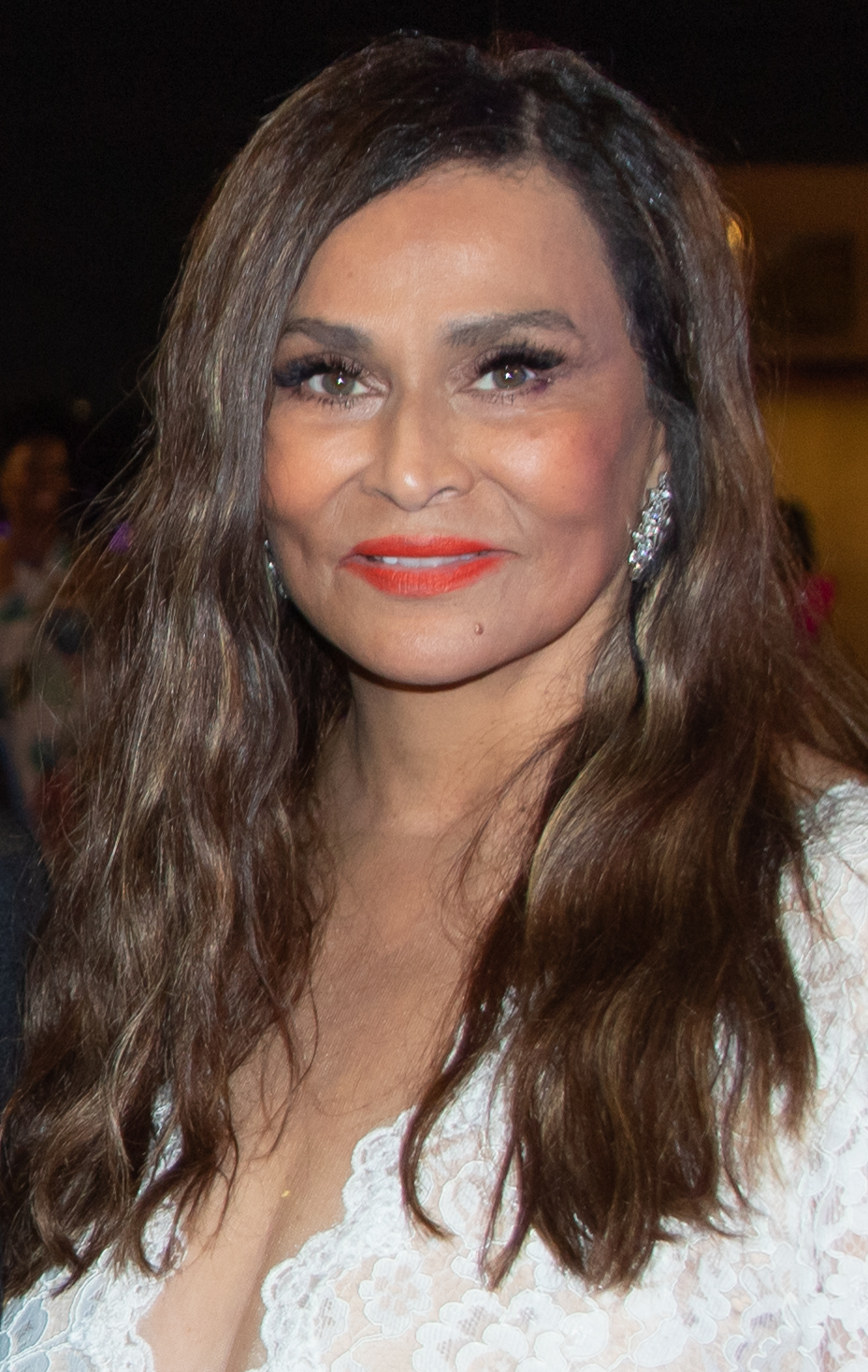
- Knowles in 2023
- Born: Celestine Ann Beyoncé; January 4, 1954 (age 72); Galveston, Texas, US
- Other names: Tina Lawson; Tina Knowles-Lawson
- Years active: 1985–present
- Label(s): House of Deréon
- Spouses: Mathew Knowles (m. 1980; div. 2011); Richard Lawson (m. 2015; div. 2024)
- Children: Beyoncé; Solange Knowles
- Relatives: Blue Ivy Carter (granddaughter); Angela Beyincé (niece)

Celestine (Note: Also spelled "Célestine".) Ann "Tina" Beyoncé Knowles (née Beyoncé, born January 4, 1954) is an American businesswoman, fashion designer, author, and philanthropist known for establishing the brands House of Deréon and Miss Tina by Tina Knowles. She is the mother of singers Beyoncé and Solange Knowles and was married until 2011 to their father Mathew Knowles, the manager of Destiny's Child. For her contribution to the fashion business, Knowles was honored at the Accessories Council Excellence Awards in 2001.

== Personal life and family ==
Celestine Ann Beyoncé was born in Galveston, Texas, the youngest of seven siblings. Her mother, Agnéz Beyincé (née Deréon) (1909–1980), was a seamstress. Her father, Lumis Albert Beyincé (1910–1982), was a longshoreman. Due to a clerical error on her birth certificate, her surname (Beyoncé) is spelled "one letter different" from that of other members of her family. She is of Louisiana Creole heritage. Knowles was raised Catholic and attended Catholic school. Her family's roots are from New Iberia, Louisiana. She is a descendant of Acadian leader Joseph Broussard and French military officer Jean-Vincent d'Abbadie de Saint-Castin. While in high school, Knowles was a part of a singing group called the Veltones, inspired by the Supremes.

On January 5, 1980, she married Mathew Knowles, a Xerox salesman who would later quit his job to manage Destiny's Child. The pair divorced in November 2011, and share two children: Beyoncé (born 1981) and Solange (born 1986).

In the summer of 2013, she started dating actor Richard Lawson. Prior to dating, Knowles had been friends with Lawson for more than 30 years. They initially met through her friendship with his late sister. In a 2018 interview, Lawson stated that he had "always admired her from afar and up close too." The couple were married in Newport Beach, California, on April 12, 2015. Knowles filed for divorce from Lawson in July 2023, citing irreconcilable differences, and it was finalized in 2024.

Through her marriage with Lawson, Knowles became a stepmother to his daughter Bianca Lawson and his son Ricky. She also often refers to Destiny's Child member Kelly Rowland as her daughter, whom she helped raise from the age of 11 when Rowland began living with the Knowles family. In an open letter published by Time magazine in 2015, Knowles stated "I gave birth to two of you, but I have four incredible daughters" referring to Beyoncé, Solange, Kelly Rowland, and her niece Angie Beyincé.

Knowles has four grandchildren, including Blue Ivy Carter. In addition to her grandchildren through daughters Beyoncé and Solange, she also considers herself a grandmother to Kelly's two children.

In late 2024, Knowles was successfully treated for stage 1 breast cancer.

== Career ==
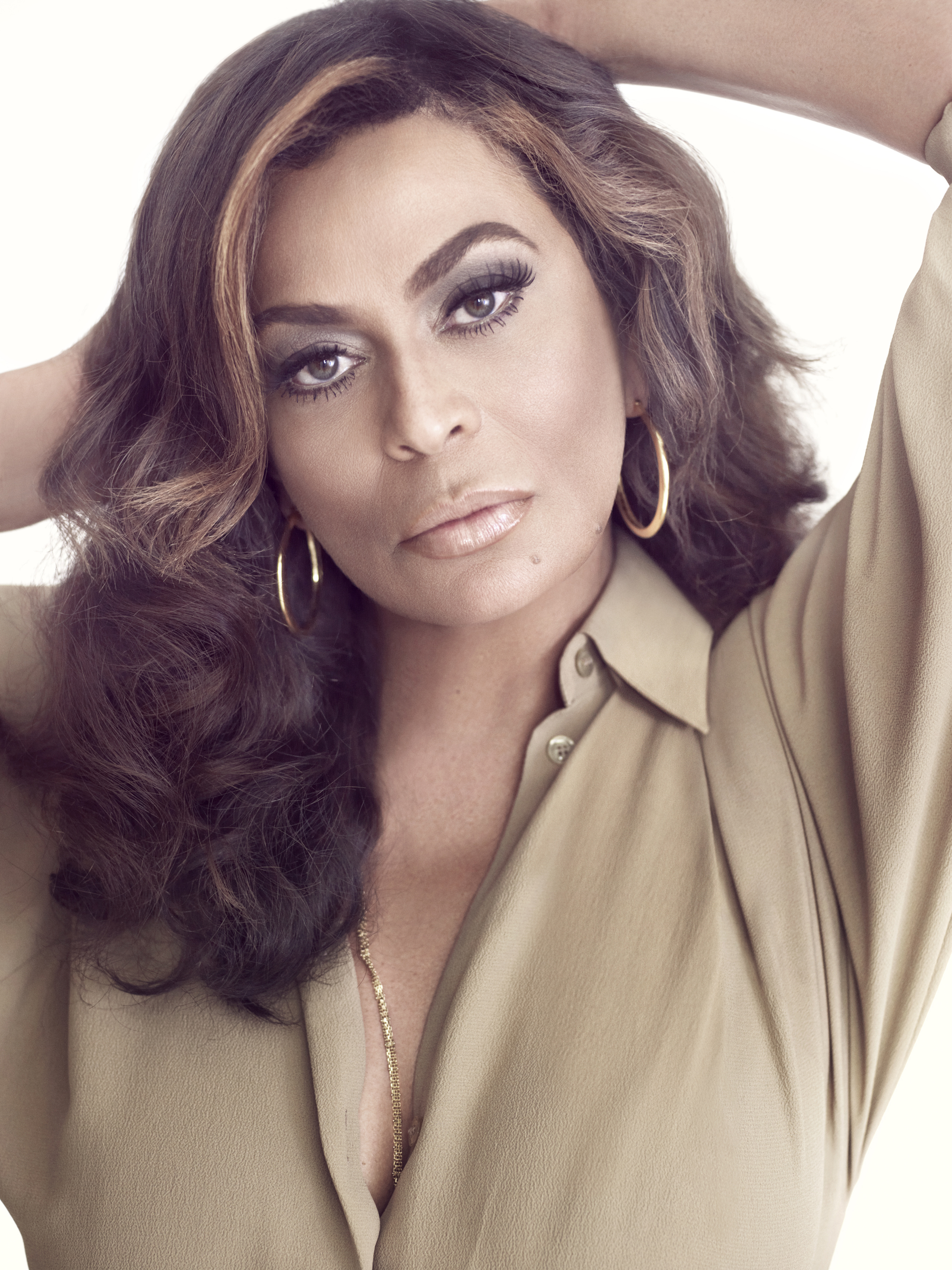
Knowles in 2010

As a fashion designer, Knowles has been featured in publications such as Vogue, Cosmopolitan, Harper’s Bazaar, L'Officiel, InStyle, and Sports Illustrated. She has also designed costumes for a number of films including Dreamgirls, Pink Panther, Austin Powers in Goldmember, Obsessed, and Cadillac Records.

She began her career at the age of 19 when she moved to California to work as a makeup artist for Shiseido Cosmetics. However, she returned home when her parents fell ill. Knowles then worked as a dance choreographer for University of Alabama at Birmingham and later a beautician in Birmingham, Alabama. In 1990, she opened Headliners, a 12-seat hair salon located in Houston, Texas. The salon went on to become one of the most famous hair businesses in Houston. Knowles's rise to prominence came as costume designer for Destiny's Child. In the early days of the group's career, she created outfits that the members wore on-stage and to events "out of necessity" because money was limited. She also styled the girls' hair, and they practiced their routines at her shop.

In 2002, she published a book titled Destiny's Style: Bootylicious Fashion, Beauty and Lifestyle Secrets From Destiny's Child in which she discussed how fashion affected Destiny's Child's success. The book was published by HarperCollins. In 2004, Knowles launched the clothing line House of Deréon alongside Beyoncé, naming it after her mother Agnes Deréon. On November 22, 2010, Knowles appeared with Beyoncé on The View to promote her clothing line called "Miss Tina by Tina Knowles". In 2010, she expanded the line to Walmart after it was previously being sold on the Home Shopping Network. Discussing her style of designing for the line, Knowles revealed she aimed to "hide flaws and create a slimming silhouette", adding, "Everything is created like a foundation garment, even the dresses. The pieces are designed to make the woman look leaner and taller."

In 2013, Knowles appeared in Beyoncé's Life Is But a Dream, and was credited as director of wardrobe. In 2016, she made a cameo in Beyoncé: Lemonade, appearing in the visual for the song "All Night", which includes shots of her with then-husband Richard Lawson on their wedding day. In 2019, she appeared briefly in the background of a few shots in Beyoncé's Homecoming, a concert film about the singer's 2018 Coachella Valley Music and Arts Festival performances.

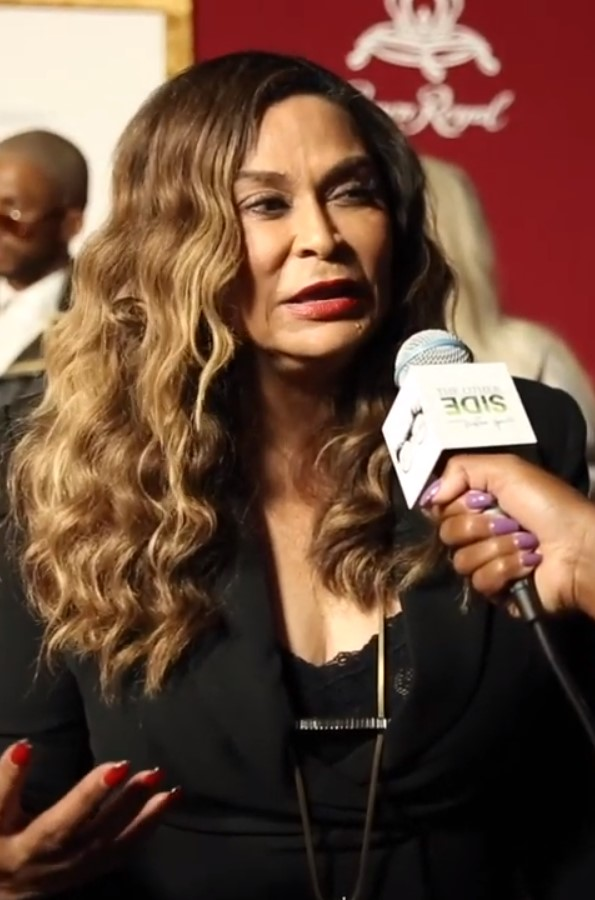
Knowles at the premiere of Shaft in 2019

In July 2020, Knowles made a cameo in Beyoncé's Disney+ film Black Is King, which incorporates music from soundtrack album The Lion King: The Gift. Knowles makes appearances in the visuals for the songs "Mood 4 Eva" and "Brown Skin Girl." Before the film's release, she revealed she had let her daughter borrow art pieces for the project. Thus, she is credited as an art curator on the film. That same month, Knowles appeared on The Today Show to promote her Instagram show "Talks with Mama Tina", which addresses voter suppression, race relations and other social issues.

On May 23, 2021, Knowles presented rapper Trae tha Truth with the Change Maker Award and introduced Padma Lakshmi at the Billboard Music Awards. On June 16, 2021, Knowles appeared in Facebook's Lift Black Voices Hub, in which she revealed what Juneteenth means to her family. In August 2021, it was announced that Knowles would be producing an upcoming program for Discovery, Inc. and the Oprah Winfrey Network, which aims to show the difficulties Black men face today, while highlighting and celebrating the triumphs and successes of everyday living. The docuseries titled Profiled: The Black Man aired in early 2022.

In December 2021, Knowles announced her show "Talks with Mama Tina" would begin airing on Facebook and include interviews with celebrities, such as Ciara and Zendaya. The first episode premiered on December 22, with Beyoncé and her children performing the show's theme song. The song was nominated for Outstanding Original Song at the 49th Daytime Emmy Awards.

In April 2022, Knowles made her acting debut on The Proud Family: Louder and Prouder. That same month, she had a role in the Lifetime thriller movie Wrath: A Seven Deadly Sins Story, starring Michelle Williams, Antonio Cupo and Romeo Miller.

In February 2024, Knowles began serving as the vice chairperson of Cécred, an American hair care brand, founded by Beyoncé.

In October 2024, Knowles announced her memoir, Matriarch, which was published in April 2025. It was chosen by Oprah Winfrey as the April 2025 selection for Oprah's Book Club 2.0.

In March 2026, Knowles sold gumbo at the Houston Livestock Show and Rodeo. Her namesake booth was cleared to resume operations following a brief closure by local health inspectors after a customer reported a complaint.

In September 2026, Knowles appeared in her first solo fashion campaign as the face of American luxury brand St. John Knits.

== Philanthropy ==
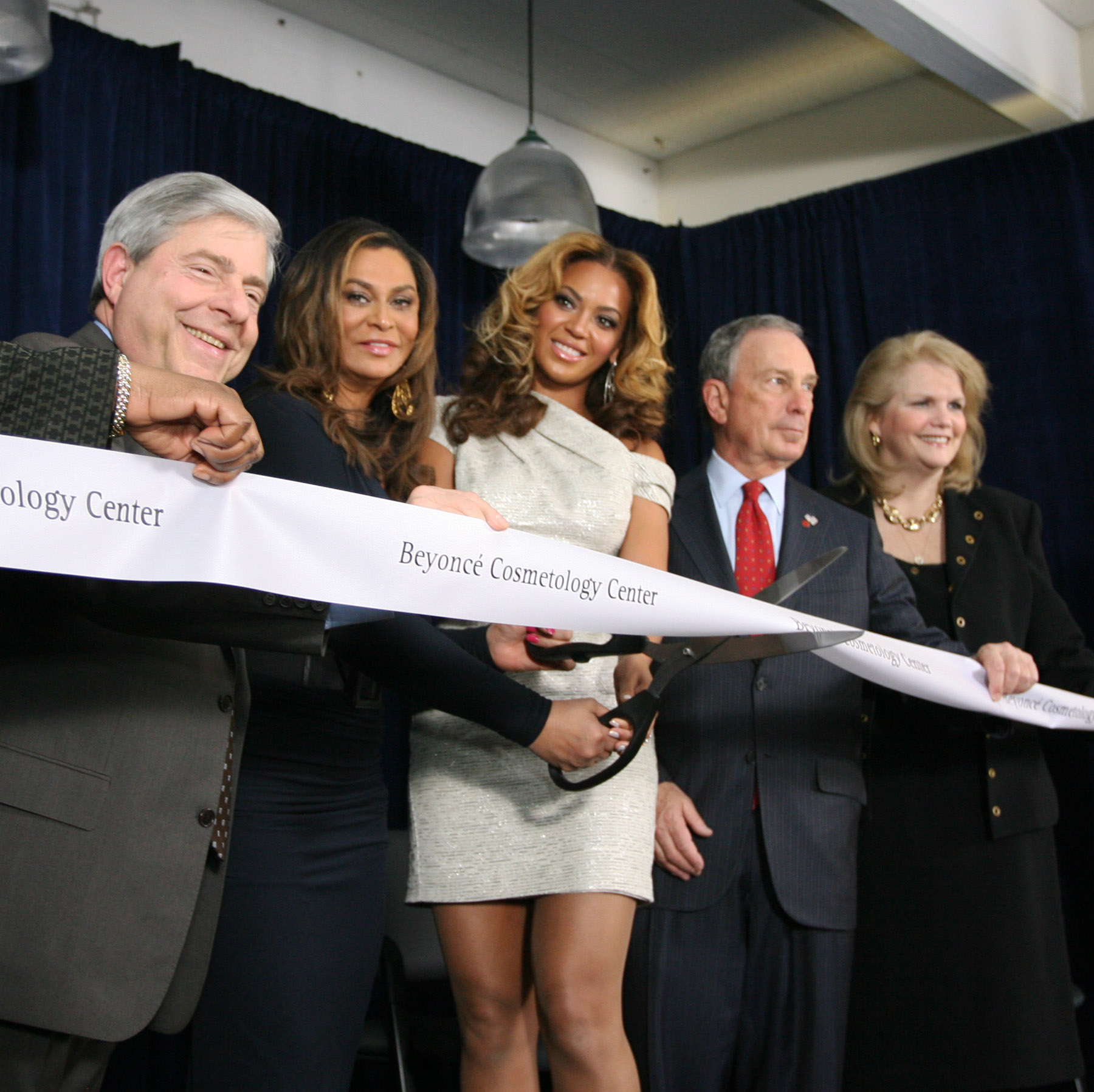
Knowles and Beyoncé Knowles-Carter pictured during the opening of the Beyoncé Cosmetology Center in March 2010

=== Humanitarian aid ===
In 2002, Tina Knowles, Beyoncé, and Kelly Rowland opened the Knowles-Rowland Center for Youth, a community center in Downtown Houston.

After witnessing the effects of Hurricane Katrina in 2005, Knowles co-founded the Survivor Foundation along with Mathew Knowles, Beyoncé, Solange, and Rowland, in order to provide transitional housing for hurricane victims and storm evacuees.

In 2010, Knowles and Beyoncé established the Beyoncé Cosmetology Center, which offers a seven-month cosmetology training course at the Phoenix House, a non-profit drug and alcohol rehabilitation organization in Brooklyn.

In 2020, following the COVID-19 pandemic, Knowles took action with Beyoncé's charity foundation BeyGood through the #IDidMyPart campaign. Knowles proposed the initiative, following the high number of deaths as a result of contracting the virus in the African-American community in Houston. Knowles has spoken to raise COVID-19 awareness on US television and news programs, including CBS News and ABC News.

=== Politics and civil rights ===
Throughout the years, Knowles has supported movements promoting civil rights and opposing gender inequality in the United States, especially with regard to African Americans and the LGBT community. Knowles is a philanthropic supporter of political and cultural movements, such as Black Lives Matter, African Pride, Still I Vote, and Mothers of the Movement. Knowles has also spoken out against police brutality and violence against women in the United States.

In 2020, Knowles was a part of the Leadership Conference on Civil and Human Rights movement, which advocates for the passage of the Health and Economic Recovery Omnibus Emergency Solutions Act to ensure health care, economic security, justice system reform, housing and voting access in the U.S., in the wake of the economic crisis following the COVID-19 pandemic. Knowles wrote an open letter to United States Senate leaders Mitch McConnell and Chuck Schumer, urging passage of the bill, with support from her daughters, Viola Davis, Whoopi Goldberg, Octavia Spencer and Jada Pinkett Smith.

=== Where Art Can Occur (WACO) Theater Center ===
In 2017, Knowles and her then-husband Richard founded the Where Art Can Occur (WACO) Theater Center, a non-profit "dedicated to the empowerment of artists, and people in general" in Los Angeles. Beyoncé, Kelly Rowland, and Solange make up the WACO Theater Center's Advisory Board.

== Honors ==
In 2001, Knowles was a recipient at the ACE Awards, which honors individuals who "help raise awareness of the accessories industry with a positive impact".

In 2020, she was honored with the Inspiring Leadership Award at Essence Festival's Empowerment Experience.

== Filmography ==
=== Film ===
| Year | Title | Role | Notes | Ref |
|---|---|---|---|---|
| 2020 | Black Is King | Herself | Visual album, released on Disney+ | |
| 2022 | Wrath: A Seven Deadly Sins Story | Sarah | Television film | |
| 2023 | Black Terror | Herself | Executive producer | |

=== Television ===
| Year | Title | Role | Notes | Ref |
|---|---|---|---|---|
| 2020 | I Got the Mic! | Herself | | |
| 2021 | RuPaul's Drag Race All Stars (season 6) | Herself | Guest judge, Episode: "Snatch Game of Love" | |
| 2021 | Friday Night Vibes | Herself | 1 episode | |
| 2021–2022 | Talks with Mama Tina | Herself | Facebook Talk-Show, co-producer | |
| 2022 | The Proud Family: Louder and Prouder | Ms. Gina (voice) | Episode: "Raging Bully" | |
| 2022 | Profiled: The Black Man | | Television docuseries, co-producer | |

=== Music videos ===
| Year | Title | Artist | Role | Ref |
|---|---|---|---|---|
| 2013 | "Grown Woman" | Beyoncé | Herself | |
| 2016 | "All Night" | Beyoncé | Herself | |
| 2020 | "Love One Another" | Tay Da Prince, John Legend | Herself | |
| 2020 | "Brown Skin Girl" | Beyoncé, Blue Ivy, SAINt JHN, WizKid | Herself | |
| 2021 | "Have Mercy" | Chlöe | Herself | |

== See also ==
- House of Deréon
- Cécred
- List of women company founders

== Bibliography ==
- Knowles, Tina (2002). Destiny's Style: Bootylicious Fashion, Beauty and Lifestyle Secrets From Destiny's Child. New York City: HarperCollins Publishers LLC. ISBN 0060097779.
- Tina Knowles at IMDb
- Tina Knowles at AllMusic. Retrieved 9 May 2022.
