= Bianca Lawson =

American actress

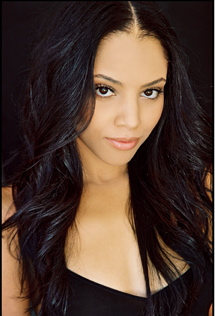
- Lawson in 2008
- Born: March 20, 1979 (age 47); Los Angeles, California, U.S.
- Education: Stella Adler Studio of Acting; Marymount High School; University of Southern California
- Occupation: Actress
- Years active: 1988–present
- Parents: Richard Lawson; Denise Gordy
- Relatives: Ricky Lawson (half-brother); Berry Gordy (great-uncle); Sky Blu (second cousin); Jason Carter (fourth cousin)
- Family: Gordy family

Bianca Lawson (born March 20, 1979) is an American actress. Lawson is known for her regular roles in the television series Saved by the Bell: The New Class, Goode Behavior, Pretty Little Liars, and Rogue. She has also had recurring roles in the series Sister, Sister, Buffy the Vampire Slayer, The Steve Harvey Show, Dawson's Creek, The Secret Life of the American Teenager, The Vampire Diaries, Teen Wolf, and Witches of East End. In 2016, Lawson began starring in the Oprah Winfrey Network drama series Queen Sugar.

== Early life ==
Lawson was born on March 20, 1979 in Los Angeles. She is the daughter of Denise (née Gordy) and actor Richard Lawson, making her the stepdaughter to Lawson's second ex-wife Tina Knowles, and former step-sister to singers Beyoncé and Solange Knowles. Lawson is also a great-niece of Motown founder Berry Gordy. She attended the Stella Adler Studio of Acting and graduated from Marymount High School, a Catholic school in Los Angeles. She then went on to study film and psychology at University of Southern California. Lawson's parents are both African-American, and she also has Italian, Native American, Portuguese, and Creole ancestry.

== Career ==
Lawson began acting at the age of nine, having appeared in commercials for Barbie and Revlon. In 1993, she was cast in the television series Saved by the Bell: The New Class as series regular Megan Jones. She appeared in multiple episodes of The WB sitcoms Sister, Sister as Rhonda Coley and The Steve Harvey Show as Rosalind. In 1996, she co-starred in the UPN sitcom Goode Behavior—which lasted for just one season—as Bianca Goode, the teenage daughter of the titular family. In 1997, she appeared in Buffy the Vampire Slayer as vampire slayer Kendra Young. In 1999, she appeared in The WB's Dawson's Creek as rival character Nikki Green.

In 2009, Lawson was cast as Shawna in The Secret Life of the American Teenager. That same year, she was cast in the CW television series The Vampire Diaries, as witch Emily Bennett. In December 2009, she was cast as Maya St. Germain in the ABC Family series Pretty Little Liars, based on the book series by Sara Shepard. She appeared in that show from June 2010 through August 2012. Since 2012, she has had a recurring role as Ms. Morell in the MTV television series Teen Wolf, based on the original film from 1985. In 2014, Lawson had a recurring role as Eva in Witches of East End. In 2015, she was cast as series regular Talia Freeman in season three of Rogue.

Lawson has made appearances in two different television miniseries. In 1998, she appeared in The Temptations as Diana Ross (whom Lawson is related to through Ross's daughter Rhonda Ross Kendrick); and in 2001, she was cast as Anna Bella Monroe in Anne Rice's The Feast of All Saints. Some of Lawson's film credits to date include Primary Colors (1998), Save the Last Dance (2001), Bones (2001) and Breakin' All the Rules (2004). Aside from film and television, Lawson provided her voice to the 2011 video game Star Wars: The Old Republic. In 2016, Lawson was cast in the Oprah Winfrey Network drama series Queen Sugar, created by Ava DuVernay.

== Filmography ==
=== Film ===
Year	Title	Role	Notes
1998	Twice the Fear	Girlfriend	Video
1998	Primary Colors	Loretta	
2000	Big Monster on Campus	Darien Stompanato	
2000	The Pavilion	Mary	
2001	Save the Last Dance	Nikki	
2001	Bones	Cynthia	
2001	The Feast of All Saints	Anna Bella Monroe	TV movie
2004	Dead & Breakfast	Kate	
2004	Breakin' All the Rules	Helen Sharp	
2004	The Pavilion	Mary	TV movie
2005	Flip the Script	Angel	
2006	Broken	Mia	
2006	National Lampoon's Pledge This!	Monique	
2007	Supergator	Carla Masters	Video
2009	The Killing of Wendy	Brooke	
2010	Don't Fade Away	Alison Johnson	
2011	Heavenly	Sasha Grant	TV movie
2012	All About Christmas Eve	Lila	TV movie
2014	House of Secrets	Julie	

=== Television ===
Year	Title	Role	Notes
1993–94	Saved by the Bell: The New Class	Megan Jones	Main cast: Seasons 1–2
1994	What'z Up?	Herself/co-host	TV series
1994	My So-Called Life	Third Bathroom Girl	Episode: "Pilot"
1995	Me and the Boys	Girl	Episode: "The Age of Reason"
1995	In the House	Rachel	Episode: "The Final Cut"
1995–96	Sister, Sister	Rhonda Coley	Recurring cast: season 3
1996–97	Goode Behavior	Bianca Goode	Main cast
1997	Smart Guy	Shirley	Episode: "Baby, It's You and You and You"
1997	The Parent 'Hood	Jasmine	Episode: "Zaria Peterson's Day Off" & "Bad Rap"
1997–98	Buffy the Vampire Slayer	Kendra Young	Recurring cast: Season 2
1998	Silk Stalkings	Renee	Episode: "Rage"
1998	The Steve Harvey Show	Rosalind	Recurring cast: season 2
1998	The Temptations	Diana Ross	Episode: "Episode #1.1 & #1.2"
1999	Smart Guy	Tracy	Episode: "It Takes Two"
1999–2000	Dawson's Creek	Nikki Green	Recurring cast: season 3
2001	Strong Medicine	Esperenza Maldonaldo	Episode: "Control Group"
2002	For the People	Asia Portman	Episode: "Textbook Perfect"
2002	Haunted	Brandi Combs	Episode: "Blind Witness"
2003	Loose Lips	Herself	TV series documentary
2004	The Division	Marilynn Resiser	Episode: "Play Ball"
2004	The Big House	Angela	Episode: "Almost Touched by an Angel"
2004	Fearless	Harmony Kaye	Episode: "Pilot"
2006	Living in TV Land	Herself	Episode: "Sherman Hemsley"
2008	The Cleaner	Jeannie	Episode: "Meet the Joneses" & "The Eleventh Hour"
2009	Bones	Albie	Episode: "Fire in the Ice"
2009	The Secret Life of the American Teenager	Shawna	Recurring cast: Season 1
2009–14	The Vampire Diaries	Emily Bennett	Recurring cast: season 1–2, 5
2010	Nikita	Emily Robinson	Episode: "The Guardian"
2010–12	Pretty Little Liars	Maya St. Germain	Main cast: season 1-2, recurring cast: Season 3
2011	American Horror Story	Abby	Episode: "Pilot"
2012	Beauty & the Beast	Lafferty	Episode: "Trapped"
2012	2 Broke Girls	Stacy	Episode: "And the Silent Partner"
2012–14	Teen Wolf	Marin Morrell	Recurring cast: Season 2–3
2013	Good Day L.A.	Herself	TV series
2014	Wolf Watch	Herself	Episode: "Episode #1.8"
2014	Witches of East End	Eva/Selina	Recurring cast: Season 2
2015	Chicago P.D.	Kylie Rosales	Episode: "We Don't Work Together Anymore"
2015	Rogue	Talia Freeman	Main cast: season 3
2016–22	Queen Sugar	Darla	Recurring cast: season 1, main cast: season 2–7

=== Video games ===
Year	Title	Role	Notes
2011	Star Wars: The Old Republic	(voice)	Provided additional voices

== Awards and nominations ==
Year	Award	Category	Title	Result	Refs
2001	Teen Choice Awards	Choice Movie: Fight Scene (shared with Julia Stiles)	Save the Last Dance	Won	
2018	Black Reel Awards for Television	Outstanding Supporting Actress, Drama Series	Queen Sugar	Nominated	
2022	NAACP Image Awards	Outstanding Supporting Actress in a Drama Series	Queen Sugar	Nominated	
2023	NAACP Image Awards	Outstanding Supporting Actress in a Drama Series	Queen Sugar	Nominated	
