= Anna Gordy Gaye =

American record executive (1922–2014)

- Born: Anna Ruby Gordy; January 28, 1922; Oconee, Georgia, U.S.
- Died: January 31, 2014 (aged 92); Los Angeles, California, U.S.
- Resting place: Forest Lawn Memorial Park (Hollywood Hills); 34.1496°N 118.3202°W
- Occupations: Songwriter, composer, businessperson
- Years active: 1956–1979
- Spouse: Marvin Gaye (m. 1963; div. 1977)
- Children: Marvin Pentz Gaye III (adopted)
- Parents: Berry Gordy II; Bertha Ida Fuller
- Relatives: Esther Gordy Edwards (sister); Gwen Gordy Fuqua (sister); Berry Gordy (brother); Robert Gordy (brother)
- Family: Gordy
- Musical career
- Origin: Detroit, Michigan, U.S.
- Genres: R&B; soul
- Labels: Anna; Motown

Anna Ruby Gaye (née Gordy; January 28, 1922 – January 31, 2014) was an American businesswoman, composer and songwriter. An elder sister of Motown founder Berry Gordy, she became a record executive in the mid-to-late 1950s distributing records released on Checker and Gone Records before forming the Anna label with Billy Davis and her sister Gwen Gordy Fuqua. Gordy later became known as a songwriter for several hits including the Originals' "Baby, I'm for Real", and "God Is Love" from Marvin Gaye's What's Going On album. The first wife of Gaye, their turbulent marriage later served as inspiration for Gaye's 14th studio album, Here, My Dear.

== Life and career ==
Born Anna Ruby Gordy on January 28, 1922, in Oconee, Georgia, she was the third-eldest child of Berry Gordy Sr. (Berry Gordy II) and Bertha Ida (née Fuller) Gordy's eight children. Into her first year, Gordy's family relocated to Detroit. Following graduation from high school in 1940, Gordy relocated to California, which is where Gordy's younger brother Berry moved after he dropped out of high school to form a boxing career. Returning to Detroit in the mid-1950s, she and younger sister Gwen became operators of the photo concession at Detroit's Flame Show Bar.

By the late 1950s, members of the Gordy clan were getting involved with the music business. In 1956, Anna began her career distributing records for Checker Records. In about 1957, she distributed a few recordings for Gone Records. In 1958, Anna and Gordy's younger sister Gwen founded the label Anna Records with musician Billy Davis, a year before Berry launched Tamla Records. Anna distributed Tamla's first national hit, Barrett Strong's "Money (That's What I Want)". Artists such as David Ruffin and Joe Tex also recorded for the label, and Marvin Gaye became a session musician with the company. After the label was absorbed as a subsidiary of Motown in 1961, Gordy joined Motown as a songwriter. Some of her early compositions were recorded by Gaye and Mary Wells. In 1965, Gordy co-wrote Stevie Wonder's "What Christmas Means to Me".

Gordy later co-composed the Originals' hits "Baby, I'm for Real" and "The Bells" with Marvin Gaye. Gordy's name was included as a co-songwriter on two songs on Gaye's 1971 album, What's Going On, including "Flyin' High (In the Friendly Sky)" and "God Is Love". In 1973, Gordy's name was included in the credits to the song "Just to Keep You Satisfied", which was originally recorded in 1969 by the Monitors, and recorded by the Originals two years later. Gaye's version was overdubbed from the Originals recording and reversed the song's romantic lyrics for a more solemn view of the end of a marriage. Gordy left Motown at the end of the 1970s and retired from the music industry.

== Personal life ==
Gordy met Marvin Gaye in 1959 when he was 20 years old and singing with Harvey and the New Moonglows. Gaye soon began working at Anna Records and soon developed an attraction to Gordy. They eventually began dating in 1960. After a three-year courtship, they married in June 1963.

Inspired by their romance, Marvin penned hit singles about Anna including "Stubborn Kind of Fellow" and "Pride & Joy." Of "Pride and Joy", Gaye said, "When I composed 'Pride and Joy', I was head over heels in love with Anna. I just wrote what I felt about her, and what she did for me. She was my pride and joy."

The marriage between Marvin and Anna was reportedly turbulent, including two public spats. In order to bring some stability to their home life, Anna and Marvin adopted a boy born on November 17, 1966, who was named Marvin Pentz Gaye III, after his adoptive father. The boy was said to have been naturally conceived by Anna and Marvin in Motown's public relations stories of the couple, but Marvin confirmed his adoption in David Ritz's biography, Divided Soul: The Life of Marvin Gaye. In later years, the identity of the mother was revealed to be Denise Gordy, Anna's niece.

In 1971, the couple moved to Hollywood. Two years later, they filed for legal separation. Gaye settled in with a young woman named Janis Hunter, with whom he had two children. In November 1975, Gordy filed for divorce. After nearly two years, the case was settled in Gordy's favor after Gaye agreed to remit a portion of his royalties from his next album to her. The resulting album, Here, My Dear, gave audiences a view of the marriage from Marvin's point of view. After its release in December 1978, Gordy threatened to sue Marvin for $5 million for the invasion of privacy. Nothing came of her threat.

In the 1980s, Marvin and Anna reconciled as friends, and Anna accompanied Marvin to industry events following the release of his comeback album Midnight Love, in 1982. Anna attended the Grammy Awards in 1983, at which Marvin was awarded two trophies. Marvin's death in 1984 devastated Anna; later she and Marvin's three children scattered most of his ashes near the Pacific Ocean, while she kept a portion. When Marvin was honored with induction into the Rock and Roll Hall of Fame, Anna and Marvin Gaye III accepted on his behalf.

Gordy never remarried. Her last public appearance was in June 2008. She attended a Cedars-Sinai Medical Center Heart Foundation event at which her brother Berry was honored.

== Death ==
Gordy died of natural causes on January 31, 2014, three days after her 92nd birthday. She is buried at Forest Lawn Memorial Park – Hollywood Hills, Courts of Remembrance, Sanctuary of Enduring Protection.
