= Denise Gordy =

American actress and singer

- Born: Denise Georgette Gordy; Detroit, Michigan, U.S.
- Occupations: Actress, singer
- Years active: 1972–1991
- Spouse: Richard Lawson (m. 1978; div. 1989)
- Children: 2, including Bianca Lawson
- Relatives: Rockwell (cousin); Redfoo (cousin); Jimmy Carter (second cousin once removed)
- Family: Gordy

Denise Georgette Gordy is an American former film and television actress and singer. She is a niece of Motown founder Berry Gordy and the mother of actress Bianca Lawson.

== Family and career ==
Denise Georgette Gordy was born in Detroit, Michigan, the daughter of George and Rosemary Gordy. She has several siblings, including a brother named George Gordy, Jr., and a sister named Patrice. Motown founder Berry Gordy is her uncle; Anna Gordy Gaye is her aunt. Gordy has appeared in numerous television and theatrical features, beginning in 1972 with her role in Lady Sings the Blues as a dancer in the nightclub chorus. In 1974, Gordy appeared in Black Fist (originally titled Bogard). She contributed vocals to the soundtrack album for the film, recording the song "Let's Do It Again". Gordy retired from acting, following her role in Toy Soldiers (1991).

== Personal life ==
Gordy was married to actor Richard Lawson from December 31, 1978 until 1989. They share one child, actress Bianca Lawson. Gordy is also the biological mother of Marvin Gaye III, who was born on November 17, 1965, when she was a teenager. Gordy's 43-year-old aunt Anna Gordy Gaye, who was married to singer Marvin Gaye at the time, was unable to conceive. Thus, shortly after Marvin III's birth, Anna and Marvin adopted him.

== Filmography ==
Film and television
Year	Show	Role	Notes
1972	Lady Sings the Blues	Dancer	Film
1974	Black Fist	Bea	Film
1975	Mahogany	Uncredited role	Film
1976	Starsky & Hutch	Hooker	TV series
1976	Charlie's Angels	Nikki	TV series
1977	Little Ladies of the Night	Foxy Lady	TV film
1977	Scott Joplin	The Girl	Film
1981	Enos	Laura	TV series
1983	At Ease	Commando Girl	TV series
1983	Bare Essence		TV series
1983	D.C. Cab	Denise	Film
1984	Fantasy Island	1st Nurse	TV series
1984	Getting Physical	Video Lady No. 2	TV film
1985	My Man Adam	Willette	Film
1985	It's a Living	Customer	TV series
1986	Reform School Girls	Claudie	Film
1991	Toy Soldiers	Parent	Film
