= All I Could Do Was Cry =

Single by Etta James

from the album At Last!
- B-side: "Boy of My Dreams"
- Released: 1960
- Recorded: 1960
- Genre: Doo-wop, R&B, Blues
- Length: 2:35
- Label: Chess
- Songwriters: Billy Davis, Berry Gordy, Gwen Gordy

Etta James singles chronology
"Spoonful" (1960)	"All I Could Do Was Cry" (1960)	"My Dearest Darling" (1960)

"All I Could Do Was Cry" is a doo-wop/rhythm and blues single recorded in 1960, and released in March that year by the singer Etta James. It was written for James by Chess songwriter Billy Davis, Berry Gordy and his sister Gwen Gordy. The song eventually peaked at number 2 on the US Billboard R&B chart and number 33 on the pop chart. James would later re-record the song in the early 1990s.

== Background ==
The song was said to be inspired by James' former boyfriend Harvey Fuqua dating Davis' former girlfriend, who was Gwen. Gordy and Fuqua later married the same year the song was recorded, which likely added to the tension in James' bluesy vocals.

== Chart performance ==
Etta James version

Chart (1960)	Peak position
US Billboard 100	33
US Billboard Hot R&B Sides	2

== Cover versions ==
- Ike & Tina Turner released a version of the song on their live album The Ike & Tina Turner Show - Vol. 2 in 1965. They also included another live rendition on their 1969 live album In Person, and a previously unissued studio version was released on the compilation album The Kent Years in 2000.
- Beyoncé covered the song while filming her role depicting James in the 2008 film, Cadillac Records.
- Motown vocalist Yvonne Fair covered this standard in 1969, but the recording wasn't released until it appeared on the "Motown Unreleased 1969" CD series, released in 2019.
