= Ricky Lawson (songwriter) =

American A&R, songwriter

Richard "Ricky" Landon Lawson
- Born: 1992 (age 33–34)
- Parent: Richard Lawson (father)
- Relatives: Bianca Lawson (half-sister)
- Musical career
- Genres: R&B; pop
- Occupations: A&R; songwriter
- Label: Parkwood Entertainment

Richard "Ricky" Landon Lawson (born 1992) is a Grammy-nominated American songwriter and A&R. Lawson is the son of actor Richard Lawson and the younger half-brother of actress Bianca Lawson. He is best known for co-writing the Billboard Hot 100-charting songs "Heated" and "Summer Renaissance" from Beyoncé's 2022 album Renaissance and managing projects such as Chloe x Halle's "Ungodly Hour" visual for Beyoncé's company Parkwood Entertainment, as well as her film Black Is King and the Renaissance World Tour.

== Songwriting/production credits ==
Credits are courtesy of Discogs and Tidal.

Title	Year	Artist	Album
"Bigger"	2019	Beyoncé	The Lion King: The Gift
"Heated"	2022	Beyoncé	Renaissance
"Summer Renaissance"	2022	Beyoncé	Renaissance
"Amen"	2024	Beyoncé	Cowboy Carter

== Project management/A&R credits ==
Project	Year	Artist
The Lion King: The Gift	2019	Beyoncé
Ungodly Hour	2020	Chloe x Halle
Black Is King	2020	Beyoncé
"Savage Remix" (Featuring Beyoncé)	2020	Megan Thee Stallion
Renaissance	2022	Beyoncé
Renaissance World Tour	2023	Beyoncé
Cowboy Carter	2024	Beyoncé
Resurrection (with Timbaland)	2026	Chloe Bailey
B'Day: 20th Anniversary Edition	2026	Beyoncé

== Awards and nominations ==
Year	Ceremony	Award	Result	Ref
2023	65th Annual Grammy Awards	Grammy Award for Album of the Year (Renaissance)	Nominated	
