= Richard Lawson (actor) =

American actor (born 1947)

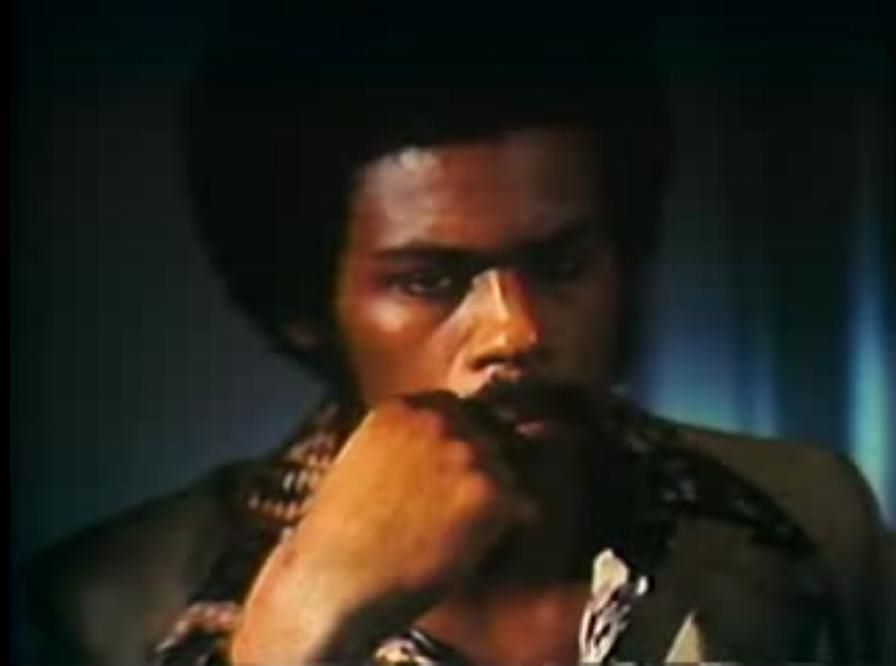
- Lawson in Black Fist (1974)
- Born: Rickey Lee Lawson; March 7, 1947 (age 79); Loma Linda, California, U.S.
- Other name: Rick Lawson
- Occupation: Actor
- Years active: 1969–present
- Spouse(s): Denise Gordy (m. 1978; div. 1989) Tina Knowles (m. 2015; div. 2024)
- Children: Bianca Lawson; Ricky Lawson
- Website: richardlawson.net

Rickey Lee Lawson (born March 7, 1947) is an American actor who has starred in movies and on television. He is perhaps best known for his roles in genre films; he portrayed Ryan in the 1982 film Poltergeist, and Dr. Ben Taylor in the 1983 NBC miniseries V.

== Early life and career ==
Born Rickey Lee Lawson in Loma Linda, California, Lawson was drafted into the United States Army and became a medic. He served 21 months in Vietnam during the Vietnam War and was wounded in action. After completing his military duty, he embarked on an acting career. His first feature film role (uncredited) was that of a gay man targeted for murder in the 1971 movie Dirty Harry. In 1973, he played Willis in Scream Blacula Scream. His other well known roles include the 1979 movie The Main Event, and the 1984 drama Streets of Fire, where he played Officer Ed Price. Lawson's first ongoing starring role in a television series was in Australian drama Hotel Story in 1977, however, that series was cancelled before the first episode aired. He later starred in the 1980s series Chicago Story; he took the ongoing role of Nick Kimball on the prime time soap opera Dynasty from 1986 to 1987, appeared in The Days and Nights of Molly Dodd as Detective Nathaniel Hawthorne from 1989 to 1991, and was in the daytime soap opera All My Children as Lucas Barnes from 1992 to 1994. Lawson has made many guest appearances on television, including roles on Kojak, Get Christie Love!, Sister, Sister, Soul Food, The Bernie Mac Show, The Division, All in the Family and Strong Medicine.

== Personal life ==
Lawson was married to his first wife, actress Denise Gordy, from New Year's Eve 1978 until 1989. They have one daughter, actress Bianca Lawson, born in 1979. Lawson also has a son named Ricky, born in 1992. On March 22, 1992, Lawson survived the USAir Flight 405 plane crash, after take-off from LaGuardia Airport, in Queens, New York City. During the summer of 2013, he began dating Tina Knowles, fashion designer and mother of singers Beyoncé and Solange Knowles. Lawson and Knowles had known each other for over 30 years, as she was the best friend of his late sister. As a result, Lawson stated that he had "always admired her from afar and up close too." The couple married on April 12, 2015. Knowles filed for divorce in July 2023, and it was finalized in 2024.

== Filmography ==
=== Film ===
Year	Title	Role	Notes
1971	Dirty Harry	Homosexual	
1973	Scream Blacula Scream	Willis Daniels	
1973	Fox Style	Little Henry	
1974	Sugar Hill	Lt. Valentine	
1974	Bogard	Leroy Fisk	
1975	Crossfire	Officer Ken Dillard	TV movie
1977	Audrey Rose	Policeman #1	
1978	Coming Home	Pat	
1979	Charleston	James Harris	TV movie
1979	The Jericho Mile	R.C. Stiles	TV movie
1979	Buffalo Soldiers	Caleb Holiday	TV movie
1979	The Main Event	Hector Mantilla	
1980	The Golden Moment: An Olympic Love Story	Gene Davis	TV movie
1982	Poltergeist	Ryan	
1982	Leadfoot	Officer Venchek	TV movie
1984	Streets of Fire	Officer Ed Price	
1985	Stick	Cornell	
1986	Under the Influence	Dr. Duran	TV movie
1986	Johnnie Mae Gibson: FBI	Adam Prentice	TV movie
1989	The Forgotten	Sergeant Frank 'Doc' McDermott	TV movie
1989	Double Your Pleasure	Dash	TV movie
1997	Wag the Dog	CIA Agent	
1998	How Stella Got Her Groove Back	Jack	
1999	Justice	Gus	TV movie
1999	Jackie's Back	Milkman Summers (Jackie's Ex-Husband #1)	TV movie
2000	Mars and Beyond	Mission Flight Director Maynard Nixon	Short
2001	Blue Hill Avenue	Uncle Rob	
2003	Black Listed	Agent Gordon	Video
2003	Maniac Magee	Mr. Beale	TV movie
2003	Out of the Rain	Donald	
2004	Christmas at Water's Edge	Mr. Turner	TV movie
2005	Guess Who	Marcus	
2006	The Last Stand	Winston	
2007	I'm Through with White Girls	James Evans	
2008	Love for Sale	Uncle Mac	
2009	The Business of Show	Special Thanks	Short
2010	For Colored Girls	Frank	
2010	Massacre	Rich Cannon	
2015	Royal Family Thanksgiving	Leighton Royal	TV movie
2015	Royal Family Christmas	Leighton Royal	TV movie
2017	Searching for Neverland	Joe Jackson	TV movie
2019	From Zero to I Love You	Ron Logsdon	
2019	Always a Bridesmaid	Carlton Blakeston Sr	
2020	Old Dog	Curtis Winters	Short
2021	The Corner Store	Marvin	Short
2021	North Hollywood	Adolf's Dad	
2021	Not Alone	Dr. James Clay	
2021	A Holiday Chance	Garvin	
2024	Divorce in the Black	Clarence	
2025	Aftershock: The Nicole P Bell Story	Al Sharpton	

=== Television ===
Year	Title	Role	Notes
1973	Shaft	Don Lewis	Episode: "The Enforcers"
1973	Kojak	1st Suspect	Episode: "One for the Morgue"
1974	Get Christie Love!	Rick Allen	Episode: "Fatal Image"
1975	The Streets of San Francisco	Eddie Hill	Episode: "Endgame"
1975	Medical Center	Andy Willis	Episode: "Survivors"
1976	Bert D'Angelo/Superstar	Hutchins	Episode: "The Brown Horse Connection"
1976	Most Wanted	Carl Webster	Episode: "Pilot"
1977	Police Woman	Skeet	Episode: "Once a Snitch"
1977	All in the Family	Angry Black Man	Episode: "Mike the Pacifist"
1977	The Fantastic Journey	Barker	Episode: "Funhouse"
1977–78	Hotel Story		Main cast
1978	Good Times	Raymond	Episode: "I Had a Dream"
1978	Julie Farr, M.D.	Bert Rollins	Episode: "Old Friends"
1978	What Really Happened to the Class of '65?	Lt. Sawyer	Episode: "Reunion in Terror"
1981	The White Shadow	David Mackey	Episode: "Burnout"
1982	T. J. Hooker	Officer David McNeil	Episode: "The Protectors"
1982	Chicago Story	Det. O.Z. Tate	Main cast
1983	V	Dr. Ben Taylor	Miniseries
1983	Hardcastle and McCormick	Kid Calico	Episode: "The Boxer"
1984	Magnum, P.I.	Gerald Calvin	Episode: "Under World"
1985	St. Elsewhere	The Messiah	Episode: "Cheers"
1985	Remington Steele	Monroe Henderson	Episode: "Premium Steele"
1986	Comedy Factory	Dr. Julius Pepper	Episode: "The Faculty"
1986–87	Dynasty	Nick Kimball	Recurring cast: Season 7
1987	Amen	Dr. Jonathan Wallace	Episode: "Thelma's Birthday"
1988	CBS Summer Playhouse	Nick Scott	Episode: "Silent Whisper"
1988	Wiseguy	Thurman McGill	Episode: "Last of the True Believers"
1988	227	Raymond Blake	Episode: "A Yen for Lester"
1988–91	The Days and Nights of Molly Dodd	Det. Nathaniel Hawthorne	Recurring cast
1989	1st & Ten: The Championship	Coleman King	Episode: "Final Bow" & "Out of the Past"
1989–91	MacGyver	Jesse Colton	3 episodes
1991	Father Dowling Mysteries	Brad Whitfield	Episode: "The Joyful Noise Mystery"
1991	The Cosby Show	Mr. Bostic	Episode: "Pam Applies to College"
1992–93	All My Children	Lucas Barnes	Regular cast
1993	Saved by the Bell: The New Class	Judge Thurston Jones	Episode: "Good-bye Megan"
1995	Picket Fences	Dale "Sky" Betts	Episode: "Bloodbrothers"
1996	Pandora's Clock	Captain Daniel Robb	Episode: "Episode #1.1 & 1.2"
1997	Good News	Percy Shepperd	Episode: "Show Me the Money: Part 1 & 2"
1997	Moesha	Marlon James	Episode: "Talk to the Town"
1998	The Parent 'Hood	T.K.'s Father	Episode: "Color Him Father"
1998	L.A. Doctors	Gary Miller	Episode: "The Code"
1999	Sister, Sister	Victor Sims	Recurring cast: season 6
1999	Judging Amy	Thomas Horne	Episode: "An Impartial Bias"
2000	Family Law	Chuck	Episode: "One Mistake"
2001	JAG	Sgt. Dan Craig	Episode: "Baby, It's Cold Outside"
2001	Touched by an Angel	Nicholas Freeman	Episode: "The Sign of the Dove"
2001	Soul Food	Reverend Bobby Baxter	Episode: "Games People Play"
2001	Strong Medicine	Alton Clayborne	Episode: "Systemic"
2001	The Bernie Mac Show	Bishop	Episode: "Saving Bernie Mac"
2002	The District	Commander Richard Gray	Episode: "Shades of Gray" & "Payback"
2002	For the People	Clay Portman	Episode: "Textbook Perfect"
2003	Half & Half	Ben	Episode: "The Big How the Ex Stole Christmas Episode"
2004	The Division	LaBon	Episode: "Hail, Hail, the Gang's All Here"
2004	Dead Like Me	William Garrett	Episode: "Hurry"
2004	NYPD Blue	Agent Wycoff	Episode: "Divorce, Detective Style"
2005	E-Ring		Episode: "Pilot"
2006	All of Us	Luther Brody	Episode: "Like Father, Like Son... Like Hell!" & "My Two Dads"
2008	Numb3rs	Clay Porter, Sr.	Episode: "End Game"
2011	Angry Boys	Shwayne Senior	Recurring cast
2013–16	Real Husbands of Hollywood	Detective Smith	Episode: "Hook, Lie & Sink Her" & "Hart in the Hood"
2015	Being Mary Jane	Charles	Episode: "Sparrow"
2016	Saints & Sinners	Pastor Evan Johnson	Episode: "Power Is Our Religion"
2017	Stitchers	Admiral Decker	Episode: "Out of the Shadows" & "Maternis"
2017–21	Grey's Anatomy	Bill Pierce	3 episodes
2018	In Contempt	Earl Sullivan	Recurring cast
2019	Mixed-ish	Lynwood	Episode: "Do They Know It's Christmas?"
2021	Partners in Rhyme	Windell	Episode: "F.O.E."
2022	The Ms. Pat Show	Major	Episode: "Parents Just Don't Understand"
2024–25	Beauty in Black	Norman	Series regular
