= Robert Gordy =

American music publishing executive (1931–2022)

- Born: Robert Louis Gordy; July 15, 1931; Detroit, Michigan, U.S.
- Died: October 21, 2022 (aged 91); Marina del Rey, California, U.S.
- Occupations: Songwriter, music publishing executive, recording artist
- Family: Berry Gordy (brother); Redfoo (nephew); Sky Blu (great-nephew)

Robert Louis Gordy (July 15, 1931 – October 21, 2022) was an American songwriter, music publishing executive, and recording artist under the stage name Bob Kayli. He released the minor hit song "Everyone Was There" in 1958. He was the brother of Motown founder Berry Gordy Jr. and uncle of Redfoo.

== Early life ==
Gordy was born in Detroit, Michigan, on July 15, 1931. He was the youngest of eight children of Berry "Pops" Gordy Sr. and Bertha Fuller. Gordy followed in the footsteps of his brother Berry and became a boxer. He later performed at local music venues like the Flame Show Bar, where he also managed the darkroom for his sister Gwen.

== Career ==
Gordy had a brief career as a recording artist and had a minor hit as Bob Kayli with the novelty song "Everyone Was There" (1958), co-written with his brother Berry and leased by him to the Carlton label. The record reached number 96 on the Billboard Hot 100 in November 1958 and he performed it on the Dick Clark TV Show. However, the song's popularity declined precipitously when the public found out that he was African American.

Gordy recorded a second single on Gordy's Anna label in 1959, "Never More", before working for a time in the postal service. As his older brother's Motown company expanded, Robert returned to work for it, initially as a recording engineer. He also recorded two further singles as Bob Kayli, "Small Sad Sam" (a cover of Phil McLean's answer record to "Big Bad John", Tamla, 1961) and "Hold On Pearl" (Gordy, 1962). Neither was successful and his career as a recording artist ended.

From 1961, Gordy worked in Motown's publishing arm Jobete Music Publishing. In 1965 at age 34, he took over as general manager and vice-president of Jobete Music Publishing for more than 20 years following the death of his sister Loucye and being recognized as the number 1 chart publisher for 14 years. As a songwriter, he co-wrote several songs for early Motown artists such as "You're What's Happening (In the World Today)", the B-side to "I Heard it Through the Grapevine", Motown's biggest single up until that time. As an actor, Robert Gordy also played the drug pusher character "Hawk" in his first acting role in the 1972 film Lady Sings the Blues. By 1974 when Mr. Gordy was 54, Jobete had a catalog of over 7,000 songs, with Robert Gordy stating that his aim for the company was to have a "well-rounded stable" of songs, including country and western as well as its established repertoire. He moved Jobete from a holder of copyrights into a highly profitable international publishing company. He continued to head Jobete until 1985.

== Personal life ==
Gordy was married to Theresa until her death. Together, they had four children. One of them, Robert Jr., predeceased Gordy in June 2021. One of Gordy's nephews was singer/rapper Redfoo.

Gordy died on October 21, 2022, at his home in Marina del Rey, California. He was 91, and died of natural causes.

== Selected songwriting credits ==
| Song | Co-writer(s) | Performer(s) | Ref(s) |
|---|---|---|---|
| "Everyone Was There" | Berry Gordy | Bob Kayli | |
| "Minnie the Ugly Duckling" | None | The Contours | |
| "The World Is Rated X" | Ezra Bolton, Mel Bolton, Marilyn McLeod | Marvin Gaye | |
| "You're What's Happening (in the World Today)" | George Gordy, Allen Story | Marvin Gaye | |
| "Your Kiss of Fire" | Harvey Fuqua | The Supremes | |
