= Smokey Robinson discography =

- Studio albums: 24
- Singles: 58

The following is the solo discography of Smokey Robinson from 1973 to the present day. For information about Robinson's recorded output as a member of The Miracles, see The Miracles discography. For a list of successful songs written by Robinson, see List of songs written by Smokey Robinson.

== Albums ==
Tamla Motown releases
Year	Album	Peak chart positions			Certifications
Year	Album	US	US R&B	UK	Certifications
1973	Smokey	70	10	—	
1974	Pure Smokey	99	12	—	
1975	A Quiet Storm	36	7	—	
1976	Smokey's Family Robinson	57	9	—	
1977	Deep in My Soul	47	16	—	
1977	Big Time (Original Motion Picture Soundtrack)	—	39	—	
1978	Love Breeze	75	19	—	
1979	Where There's Smoke...	17	8	—	
1980	Warm Thoughts	14	4	—	
1981	Being with You	10	1	17	RIAA: Gold
1982	Yes It's You Lady	33	6	—	
1983	Touch the Sky	50	8	—	
1984	Essar	141	35	—	
1986	Smoke Signals	104	23	—	
"—" denotes releases that did not chart

Motown releases
Year	Album	Peak chart positions		Certification
Year	Album	US	US R&B	Certification
1987	One Heartbeat	26	1	RIAA: Gold
1990	Love, Smokey	112	23	
1999	Intimate	134	28	
2005	My World (The Definitive Collection)	64	19	

Other label releases
Year	Album	Peak chart positions		
Year	Album	US	US R&B	UK
1991	Double Good Everything: Label: SBK	—	64	—
2004	Food for the Spirit: Label: Liquid 8	—	44	—
2006	Timeless Love: Label: Universal	109	18	—
2009	Time Flies When You're Having Fun: Label: Robso	59	10	—
2014	Smokey & Friends: Label: Verve	12	2	21
2017	Christmas Everyday (Amazon Original): Label: Smokey Robinson	—	—	—
2023	Gasms: Label: TLR	—	—	—
2025	What the World Needs Now: Label: Gaither Music Group	—	—	—
"—" denotes releases that did not chart

== Singles ==
Year	Title	Peak chart positions					Certification
Year	Title	US BB	US R&B	US CB	US AC	UK	
1973	"Sweet Harmony"	48	31	—	60	—	
1973	"Baby Come Close"	27	7	—	36	—	
1974	"It's Her Turn to Live" /	82	29	—	69	—	
1974	"Just My Soul Responding"	—	—	—	—	35	
1974	"Virgin Man"	56	12	—	70	—	
1975	"I Am I Am"	56	6	—	60	—	
1975	"Baby That's Backatcha"	26	1	—	38	—	
1975	"The Agony and the Ecstasy"	36	7	—	50	—	
1976	"Quiet Storm"	61	25	—	77	—	
1976	"Open"	81	10	—	102	—	
1976	"When You Came" (Canada only)	—	—	—	—	—	
1976	"An Old Fashioned Man"	—	—	—	—	—	
1977	"There Will Come a Day (I'm Gonna Happen to You)"	42	7	—	66	—	
1977	"Vitamin U"	101	18	—	—	—	
1977	"Theme from Big Time, Part I"	—	38	—	—	—	
1978	"Daylight and Darkness" /	75	9	—	90	—	
1978	"Why You Wanna See My Bad Side"	—	52	—	—	—	
1978	"Shoe Soul"	—	68	—	—	—	
1978	"Ooo Baby Baby"	—	—	—	—	—	
1979	"Pops, We Love You" (Diana Ross, Marvin Gaye, Smokey Robinson and Stevie Wonder)	59	26	—	65	66	
1979	"Get Ready"	—	82	—	—	—	
1979	"Cruisin'"	4	4	1	34	—	
1980	"Let Me Be the Clock"	31	4	—	37	—	
1980	"Heavy on Pride (Light on Love)"	—	34	—	—	—	
1980	"Wine, Women and Song" (duet with Claudette Robinson)	—	—	—	—	—	
1981	"Being with You"	2	1	4	1	1	RIAA: Gold; BPI: Gold
1981	"Aquí Con Tigo" ("Being with You" Spanish version)	—	—	—	—	—	
1981	"You are Forever"	59	31	—	66	—	
1981	"Who's Sad"	—	62	—	—	—	
1982	"Tell Me Tomorrow - Part I"	33	3	31	29	51	
1982	"Old Fashioned Love"	60	17	32	70	—	
1982	"Yes It's You Lady"	107	—	—	—	—	
1983	"Blame It on Love" (Smokey Robinson with High Inergy; credited as Smokey Robinson & Barbara Mitchell on charts)	48	35	5	49	—	
1983	"I've Made Love to You a Thousand Times"	101	8	—	—	—	
1983	"Don't Play Another Love Song"	103	75	36	—	—	
1983	"Touch the Sky"	110	68	—	—	—	
1984	"Ebony Eyes" (Rick James featuring Smokey Robinson)	43	22	35	45	96	
1984	"And I Don't Love You"	106	33	—	—	90	
1984	"I Can't Find"	109	41	—	—	—	
1985	"First Time on a Ferris Wheel" (Smokey Robinson and Syreeta Wright)	—	—	—	—	—	
1986	"Hold on to Your Love"	—	11	18	—	83	
1986	"Sleepless Nights"	—	51	—	—	—	
1986	"Because of You (It's The Best It's Ever Been)"	—	—	—	—	—	
1986	"Love Will Set You Free (Theme from Solarbabies)" (Canada only; last Tamla release)	—	—	—	—	—	
1987	"Just to See Her"	8	2	1	7	52	
1987	"One Heartbeat"	10	3	2	11	—	
1987	"What's Too Much"	79	16	15	80	—	
1988	"I Know You by Heart" (Dolly Parton with Smokey Robinson)	—	—	22	—	—	
1988	"Love Don't Give No Reason"	—	31	24	—	89	
1989	"We've Saved the Best for Last" (Kenny G with Smokey Robinson)	47	18	4	40	—	
1990	"Everything You Touch"	—	4	2	—	—	
1990	"(It's the) Same Old Love"	—	68	32	—	—	
1990	"Take Me Through the Night"	—	—	34	—	—	
1991	"Double Good Everything"	91	23	—	84	102	
1992	"I Love Your Face"	—	57	—	—	—	
1992	"Rewind"	—	56	—	106	—	
1999	"Easy to Love"	—	67	—	—	—	
2006	"Our Love Is Here To Stay" (Digital single release)	—	—	—	—	—	
2009	"You're the One for Me" (duet with Joss Stone) (Digital single release)	—	—	—	—	—	
2009	"Don't Know Why" (Digital single release)	—	—	—	—	—	
2010	"Love Bath"	—	83	—	—	—	
2011	"Mama You're My Daddy Too" (Digital single release)	—	—	—	—	—	
"—" denotes releases that did not chart

=== Billboard Year-End performances ===
Year	Song	Year-End position
1980	"Cruisin'"	13
1981	"Being with You"	13
1987	"Just to See Her"	87

== Other appearances ==
Year	Song	Album
2010	"The Tracks of My Tears" (with Stevie Wonder)	The 25th Anniversary Rock & Roll Hall Of Fame Concerts
2019	Make It Better (Anderson Paak featuring Smokey Robinson)	Ventura
