= My World (The Definitive Collection) =

Greatest hits album by Smokey Robinson
- Released: May 3, 2005
- Recorded: 1960s to 2004
- Genre: Soul
- Length: 74:24
- Language: English
- Label: Motown
- Producer: William "Mickey" Stevenson; Harry Weinger

Smokey Robinson chronology
Food for the Spirit (2004)	My World (The Definitive Collection) (2005)	Timeless Love (2006)

My World (The Definitive Collection) is a 2005 greatest hits compilation from American soul music singer Smokey Robinson, sometimes featuring his earlier group the Miracles. It has received positive reviews from critics. The compilation was produced by William "Mickey" Stevenson and Harry Weinger and features two new tracks. The original recordings were digitally remastered by Ellen Fitton at Universal Mastering Studios-East.

== Reception ==
Editors of AllMusic Guide rated this compilation four out of five stars, with critic Steve Leggett calling it "absurd" to imagine that a single compact disc could definitively catalog the singer's career, but calling it "a collection that spans four decades of elegantly arranged romantic pop in just over 70 minutes" that listeners will find enjoyable.

== Track listing ==
All tracks are Robinson solo recordings, except where noted.

1. "My World" (Timothy Bloom and Smokey Robinson) – 3:17
2. "Fallin'" (Bloom and Robinson) – 3:54
3. "Cruisin'" (Robinson and Marvin Tarplin) – 5:54
4. "Just to See Her Again" (Jimmy George and Lou Pardini) – 4:00
5. "The Tears of a Clown" (Henry Cosby, Robinson, and Stevie Wonder) by Smokey Robinson & The Miracles – 3:00
6. "You've Really Got a Hold On Me" by Smokey Robinson & The Miracles – 3:11
7. "Going to a Go-Go" (Warren "Pete" Moore, Robinson, Bobby Rogers, and Tarplin) by Smokey Robinson & The Miracles – 2:46
8. "Mickey's Monkey" (Lamont Dozier, Brian Holland, Eddie Holland) – Smokey Robinson & The Miracles – 3:12
9. "Shop Around" (Berry Gordy, Jr. and Robinson) by Smokey Robinson & The Miracles – 2:48
10. "The Tracks of My Tears" (Moore, Robinson, and Tarplin) by Smokey Robinson & The Miracles – 2:55
11. "Being with You" (Robinson) – 4:07
12. "Baby That's Backatcha" (Robinson) – 3:39
13. "I Second That Emotion" (Al Cleveland and Robinson) by Smokey Robinson & The Miracles – 2:46
14. "More Love" (Robinson) by Smokey Robinson & The Miracles – 2:46
15. "Yester Love" (Cleveland and Robinson) by Smokey Robinson & The Miracles – 2:18
16. "Ooo Baby Baby" (Moore and Robinson) by Smokey Robinson & The Miracles – 2:45
17. "Baby Come Close" (Robinson and Tarplin) – 3:27
18. "I've Made Love to You a Thousand Times" (Robinson and Tarplin) – 4:21
19. "Quiet Storm" (Robinson) – 4:02
20. "Let Me Be the Clock" (Robinson) – 5:14
21. "One Heartbeat" (Brian Ray) – 4:02

== Chart performance ==
My World (The Definitive Collection) reached 19 on Billboard's Top R&B/Hip-Hop Albums and 64 on the Billboard 200.

== See also ==
- List of 2005 albums
