= James Gadson =

American drummer (1939–2026)

- Born: June 17, 1939; Kansas City, Missouri, U.S.
- Died: April 2, 2026 (aged 86) Los Angeles, California
- Genres: R&B; soul; funk; rock
- Occupations: Musician; singer; songwriter; producer
- Instruments: Drums; percussion
- Years active: 1968–2026

James Edward Gadson (June 17, 1939 – April 2, 2026) was an American drummer and session musician. Beginning his career in the late 1960s, Gadson became one of the most-recorded drummers in the history of R&B. He was also a singer and songwriter.

== Life and career ==
Born in Kansas City, Missouri, on June 17, 1939, and raised there, Gadson, who was of African American heritage, played with the first line-up of Charles Wright's Watts 103rd Street Rhythm Band, and recorded three albums with them between 1968 and 1970. Along with other members of Wright's band, he went on to appear on many hit records, including with Dyke & the Blazers. Gadson started to become well known as a drummer following the release of the album Still Bill by Bill Withers, released by Sussex Records in 1972. He played on the Temptations album 1990, released on the Motown label in 1973.

In 1975, he played with Freddie King on Larger Than Life and went on to record with Martha Reeves, Randy Crawford, Quincy Jones, Herbie Hancock, B.B. King, Albert King, Rose Royce, Elkie Brooks and many more artists. In 1975, he anchored the Motown classic double platinum album City Of Angels, recorded by Billy Griffin & The Miracles.

Gadson was also the drummer on Marvin Gaye's "I Want You" in 1976 and Diana Ross's hit 1976 single "Love Hangover". He drummed on Thelma Houston's breakout disco hit, "Don't Leave Me This Way" (1976), recorded at Motown's West Hollywood studio complex.

He appeared on two tracks, "At the Mercy" and "Riding to Vanity Fair", on the 2005 Paul McCartney album Chaos and Creation in the Backyard.

Gadson had a brief appearance in the 2009 Adam Sandler film Funny People as a member of the jam band that Sandler's character hires to play with him.

In April 2009, Gadson joined Alex Dixon, grandson of Willie Dixon, on his 2009 release Rising from the Bushes, appearing on the tracks "Fantasy" and Willie Dixon's song "Spoonful".

In June 2009, Gadson joined Beck, Wilco, Feist and Jamie Lidell covering Skip Spence's Oar as part of Beck's Record Club series, with videos appearing on Beck's website beginning November 2009. He has drummed on Beck's albums Sea Change, The Information and Morning Phase, as well as Jamie Lidell's 2010 album Compass. Gadson played drums, as well as hambone (slapping his legs), on the D'Angelo song "Sugah Daddy", on the Black Messiah album (2014). He appeared in the 2016 video for "Mama Can't Help You No More", by Doyle Bramhall II.

In 2019, Gadson, who resided in Los Angeles, was featured on Gordon Ramsay's 24 Hours to Hell and Back as his paternal niece's and nephew-in-law's restaurant, Bayou on the Vine, was renamed "Gadson's Restaurant & Jazz Club", named after him and his late brother, guitarist Thomas Maurice 'Tutty' Gadson (died 2014).

Gadson died on April 2, 2026, at the age of 86.

== Discography ==
=== Singles ===
- "Express Yourself" (Charles Wright & the Watts 103rd Street Band) – (1970)
- "Lean On Me" (Bill Withers) – (1972)
- "Use Me" (Bill Withers) – (1972)
- "Got To Find My Baby" / "Let The Feeling Belong" (James Gadson) – Cream Records 1014 – (1972)
- "Good Vibrations" / "Just To Love You Girl" (James Gadson)– Cream Records 1019 – (1972)
- "Dancing Machine" (Jackson 5) – (1974)
- "I Want You" (Marvin Gaye) – (1976)
- "Love Hangover" (Diana Ross) – (1976)
- "Go By What's In Your Heart" / "Go By What's In Your Heart" (James Gadson) – United Artists UA-XW815-Y – (1976)
- "More Than a Woman" (Tavares) – (1978)
- "Got To Be Real" (Cheryl Lynn) – (1978)
- "Reunited" (Peaches & Herb) – (1979)
- "I Will Survive" (Gloria Gaynor) – (1979)
- "Get Up" (Vernon Burch) – (1979)
- "If You Think You're Lonely Now" (Bobby Womack) – (1981)

James Gadson & Lou Washington

- Gadson & Washington – "Ain't No Way To Live" / "Indian Village" – B And W Records – BW-011, B And W Records – BW-012 (12-inch 33 rpm single)

=== As sideman ===
With Mindi Abair

- In Hi-Fi Stereo (Heads Up, 2010)
- Wild Heart (Heads Up, 2014)

With Arthur Adams

- Back on Track (Blind Pig, 1999)
- Soul of the Blues (PM Records, 2004)
- Stomp the Floor (Delta Groove, 2009)
- Here to Make You Feel Good (Cleopatra, 2019)
- Kick Up Some Dust (Cleopatra, 2023)

With Alessi Brothers

- Driftin' (A&M Records, 1979)

With Herb Alpert

- Herb Alpert / Hugh Masekela (Horizon, 1978)

With Corinne Bailey Rae

- The Heart Speaks in Whispers (Virgin Records, 2016)

With Philip Bailey

- Continuation (Columbia Records, 1983)

With Anita Baker

- The Songstress (Elektra Records, 1983)

With Jimmy Barnes

- Soul Deeper... Songs From the Deep South (Mushroom Records, 2000)
- The Rhythm and the Blues (Liberation Records, 2009)

With Beck

- Sea Change (Geffen, 2002)
- The Information (Interscope Records, 2006)
- Morning Phase (Capitol Records, 2014)

With Booker T. & the M.G.'s

- That's the Way It Should Be (Columbia, 1994)

With Doyle Bramhall II

- Rich Man (Concord Records, 2016)

With Dianne Brooks

- Back Stairs in My Life (Reprise Records, 1976)

With Elkie Brooks

- Live and Learn (A&M Records, 1979)

With Randy Brown

- Intimately (Parachute, 1979)

With Peabo Bryson and Natalie Cole

- We're the Best of Friends (Capitol Records, 1979)

With Solomon Burke

- Make Do with What You Got (Shout! Factory, 2005)

With Jerry Butler

- Power Of Love (Mercury Records, 1973)

With Terry Callier

- Fire on Ice (Elektra, 1979)

With G. C. Cameron

- You're What's Missing in My Life (Motown, 1977)

With Jean Carn

- Sweet and Wonderful (TSOP, 1981)

With David Castle

- Castle in the Sky (Casablanca, 1977)
- Love You Forever (Casablanca, 1979)

With Paddy Casey

- Addicted to Company Pt. 1 (Victor Records, 2007)

With Ray Charles

- Wish You Were Here Tonight (Columbia, 1983)
- Do I Ever Cross Your Mind (Columbia, 1984)

With Kelly Clarkson

- Wrapped in Red (RCA Records, 2013)

With Jimmy Cliff

- Follow My Mind (Reprise, 1975)

With Joe Cocker

- Hymn for My Soul (EMI, 2007)

With Adam Cohen

- Adam Cohen (Columbia Records, 1998)

With Leonard Cohen

- The Future (Columbia Records, 1992)

With Natalie Cole

- Thankful (Capitol Records, 1977)
- Don't Look Back (Capitol Records, 1980)

With Nikka Costa

- Pebble to a Pearl (Stax Records, 2008)

With Randy Crawford

- Everything Must Change (Warner Bros. Records, 1976)
- Raw Silk (Warner Bros. Records, 1979)
- Nightline (Warner Bros. Records, 1983)

With Jamie Cullum

- Catching Tales (Verve, 2005)

With D'Angelo

- Black Messiah (RCA Records, 2014)

With Lana Del Rey

- Paradise (Polydor Records, 2012)

With Jackie DeShannon

- You're the Only Dancer (Amherst Records, 1977)

With Marcella Detroit

- The Vehicle (Right, 2013)

With The 5th Dimension

- High on Sunshine (Motown, 1978)

With Donovan

- Lady of the Stars (RCA Records, 1984)

With Yvonne Elliman

- Love Me (RSO Records, 1977)
- Night Flight (RSO Records, 1978)

With The Emotions

- Rejoice (Columbia, 1977)

With Enchantment

- Utopia (Columbia, 1983)

With Donald Fagen

- The Nightfly (Warner Bros. Records, 1982)

With Yvonne Fair

- The Bitch Is Black (Motown, 1975)

With José Feliciano

- José Feliciano (Motown, 1981)

With Four Tops

- The Show Must Go On (ABC, 1977)

With Aretha Franklin

- Sweet Passion (Atlantic Records, 1977)
- Aretha (Arista Records, 1986)

With Toko Furuuchi

- Hourglass (Sony Records, 1996)

With Charlotte Gainsbourg

- IRM (Beck, 2009)

With Terry Garthwaite

- Terry (Arista, 1975)

With Terry Garthwaite and Toni Brown

- The Joy (Fantasy, 1977)

With Marvin Gaye

- I Want You (Motown, 1976)
- Midnight Love (Columbia Records, 1982)

With Gloria Gaynor

- Love Tracks (Polydor Records, 1978)
- I Have a Right (Polydor Records, 1979)
- Stories (Polydor Records, 1980)

With Benny Golson

- Killer Joe (Columbia, 1977)

With Herbie Hancock

- Man-Child (Columbia, 1975)

With John Handy

- Hard Work (ABC, 1976)
- Carnival (ABC, 1977)

With High Inergy

- Steppin' Out (Gordy, 1978)
- Frenzy (Gordy, 1979)
- Shoulda Gone Dancin' (Gordy, 1979)
- High Inergy (Gordy, 1981)

With Thelma Houston and Jerry Butler

- Thelma & Jerry (Motown, 1977)

With Thelma Houston

- Ready to Roll (Motown, 1978)
- Breakwater Cat (RCA Records, 1980)

With The Hues Corporation

- Your Place or Mine (Warner Bros., 1978)

With Phyllis Hyman

- Can't We Fall in Love Again? (Arista, 1981)

With Jermaine Jackson

- Let Me Tickle Your Fancy (Motown, 1982)

With La Toya Jackson

- La Toya Jackson (Polydor, 1980)

With Norah Jones

- The Fall (Blue Note, 2009)

With Rickie Lee Jones

- The Evening of My Best Day (V2 Records, 2003)

With Al Johnson

- Back for More (Columbia, 1980)

With Margie Joseph

- Hear the Words, Feel the Feeling (Cotillion, 1976)
- Feeling My Way (Atlantic, 1978)

With The Keane Brothers

- Taking Off (ABC Records, 1979)

With Eddie Kendricks

- Boogie Down! (Tamla, 1974)
- The Hit Man (Tamla, 1975)

With Albert King

- Truckload of Lovin' (Tomato Records, 1976)

With Ben E. King

- Let Me Live in Your Life (Atlantic Records, 1978)

With B. B. King

- Midnight Believer (ABC Records, 1978)
- Take It Home (MCA Records, 1979)

With Elle King

- Love Stuff (RCA Records, 2015)

With Freddie King

- Larger Than Life (RSO Records, 1976)

With Gladys Knight

- Miss Gladys Knight (Buddah, 1978)

With Gladys Knight & the Pips

- At Last... The Pips (Casablanca, 1977)
- Touch (Columbia, 1981)

With Charles Kynard

- Charles Kynard (Mainstream, 1971)

With Labelle

- Chameleon (Epic, 1976)

With Patti LaBelle

- Patti LaBelle (Epic Records, 1977)
- Tasty (Epic Records, 1978)
- Winner in You (MCA Records, 1986)

With Amos Lee

- Amos Lee (Blue Note Records, 2005)
- Last Days at the Lodge (Blue Note Records, 2008)
- Mission Bell (Blue Note Records, 2011)

With Jamie Lidell

- Compass (Warp Records, 2010)

With Jon Lucien

- Romantico (Zamajo, 1980)

With Cheryl Lynn

- Cheryl Lynn (Columbia Records, 1978)
- In Love (Columbia Records, 1979)
- In the Night (Columbia Records, 1981)

With Florence and the Machine

- High as Hope (Virgin, 2018)

With Melissa Manchester

- Don't Cry Out Loud (Arista Records, 1978)

With Teena Marie

- Starchild (Epic Records, 1984)

With Ziggy Marley

- Fly Rasta (Tuff Gong Worldwide, 2014)

With Letta Mbulu

- There's Music in the Air (A&M, 1976)
- Letta (A&M, 1978)
- Sounds Of a Rainbow (Munjale, 1980)

With Paul McCartney

- Chaos and Creation in the Backyard (Parlophone, 2005)

With Marilyn McCoo and Billy Davis Jr.

- The Two of Us (ABC, 1977)
- Blackbird Lennon-McCartney Icons (BMG, 2021)

With Gwen McCrae

- On My Way (Atlantic, 1982)

With The McCrarys

- Loving is Living (Portrait, 1978)

With Lonette McKee

- Lonette (Sussex, 1974)
- Words and Music (Warner Bros., 1978)

With Shannon McNally

- Jukebox Sparrows (Capitol Records, 2002)

With Bette Midler

- Bette (Warner Bros. Records, 2000)

With The Miracles

- City of Angels (Tamla, 1975)
- The Power of Music (Tamla, 1976)

With Blue Mitchell

- Stratosonic Nuances (RCA, 1975)
- African Violet (Impulse!, 1977)
- Summer Soft (Impulse!, 1978)

With Barbara Morrison

- Love'n You (P.C.H., 1990)

With Ian Moss

- Soul on West 53rd (Liberation, 2009)

With Aaron Neville

- Bring It On Home... The Soul Classics (Sony Music, 2006)

With Paolo Nutini

- Caustic Love (Atlantic, 2014)

With David Oliver

- Mind Magic (Mercury, 1978)
- Rain Fire (Mercury, 1979)
- Here's To You (Mercury, 1980)

With The Originals

- Another Time, Another Place (Fantasy, 1978)

With Freda Payne

- Hot (Capitol, 1979)

With Peaches & Herb

- 2 Hot (Polydor, 1978)
- Twice the Fire (Polydor, 1979)
- Worth the Wait (Polydor, 1980)
- Sayin' Something (Polydor, 1981)

With Teddy Pendergrass

- Workin' It Back (Asylum Records, 1985)

With The Pointer Sisters

- Having a Party (ABC, 1977)
- Special Things (Planet, 1980)

With Billy Preston

- Late at Night (Motown, 1979)
- The Way I Am (Motown, 1981)
- Pressin' On (Motown, 1982)

With Margo Price

- That's How Rumors Get Started (Loma Vista, 2020)

With Helen Reddy

- Reddy (Capitol Records, 1979)

With Martha Reeves

- Martha Reeves (MCA Records, 1974)
- We Meet Again (Fantasy Records, 1978)

With Terry Reid

- Seed of Memory (ABC, 1976)

With LeAnn Rimes

- Today Is Christmas (Kobalt Label Service, 2015)

With Minnie Riperton

- Stay in Love (Epic Records, 1977)

With Smokey Robinson

- Love Breeze (Tamla, 1978)
- Where There's Smoke... (Tamla, 1979)
- Warm Thoughts (Motown, 1980)
- Being with You (Motown, 1981)
- Touch the Sky (Motown, 1983)
- Love, Smokey (Motown, 1990)

With Rockie Robbins

- Rockie Robbins (A&M, 1979)
- You and Me (A&M, 1980)

With David Ruffin

- Me 'n Rock 'n Roll Are Here to Stay (Motown, 1974)

With Patrice Rushen

- Shout It Out (Prestige, 1977)
- Patrice (Elektra, 1978)
- Pizzazz (Elektra, 1979)
- Posh (Elektra, 1980)
- Straight from the Heart (Elektra, 1982)

With Lara Saint Paul

- Saffo Music (Lasapa, 1977)

With Poncho Sanchez

- Latin Spirits (Concord, 2001)

With Evie Sands

- Suspended Animation (RCA Victor, 1979)

With Boz Scaggs

- Slow Dancer (Columbia Records, 1974)

With Lalo Schifrin

- Rollercoaster (MCA, 1977)

With Nancy Shanks

- Nancy Shanx (United Artists, 1977)

With Marlena Shaw

- Sweet Beginnings (Columbia Records, 1977)

With Michelle Shocked

- Mexican Standoff (Mighty Sound, 2005)

With Simply Red

- Home (Simplyred.com, 2003)

With Lynwood Slim

- Last Call (Delta Groove, 2006)

With Josh Smith

- I'm Gonna Be Ready (Crosscut, 2011)

With Phoebe Snow

- It Looks Like Snow (Columbia Records, 1976)

With Edwin Starr

- Clean (20th Century Fox, 1978)
- Stronger than You Think I Am (20th Century Fox, 1980)

With Barbra Streisand

- Wet (Columbia Records, 1979)

With Harry Styles

- Fine Line (Columbia Records, 2019)

With The Supremes

- High Energy (Motown, 1976)
- Mary, Scherrie & Susaye (Motown, 1976)

With The Sylvers

- Something Special (Capitol, 1976)

With Tavares

- Check It Out (Capitol, 1974)
- Sky High! (Capitol, 1976)
- Future Bound (Capitol, 1978)

With The Temptations

- 1990 (Gordy, 1973)
- A Song for You (Gordy, 1975)
- The Temptations Do The Temptations (Gordy, 1976)
- Power (Gordy, 1980)
- Back to Basics (Gordy, 1983)
- Milestone (Motown, 1991)

With Jean Terrell

- I Had to Fall in Love (A&M, 1978)

With Justin Timberlake

- FutureSex/LoveSounds (Jive Records, 2006)

With Diana Trask

- Believe Me Now or Believe Me Later (Dot, 1976)

With The Undisputed Truth

- Down to Earth (Gordy, 1974)
- Cosmic Truth (Gordy, 1975)
- Higher Than High (Gordy, 1975)
- Smokin (Whitfield, 1979)

With Keith Urban

- Ripcord (Capitol, 2016)

With Frankie Valli

- Heaven Above Me (MCA Records, 1980)

With Thijs Van Leer

- O My Love (Phillips Records, 1975)

With Kenny Vance

- Short Vacation (Gold Castle, 1988)

With Vulfpeck

- Mr Finish Line (Vulf, 2017)
- Running Away (Vulf, 2017)

With Leon Ware

- Musical Massage (Gordy, 1976)
- Leon Ware (Elektra, 1982)

With Was (Not Was)

- Boo! (Rykodisc, 2008)

With The Whispers

- Open Up Your Love (Soul Train, 1977)
- Whisper in Your Ear (Solar, 1979)

With Mary Wilson

- Mary Wilson (Motown, 1979)

With Lenny Williams

- Choosing You (ABC, 1977)
- Sparks of Love (ABC, 1978)
- Love Current (MCA, 1979)

With Bill Withers

- Still Bill (Sussex, 1972)
- +'Justments (Sussex, 1974)

With Womack & Womack

- Love Wars (Elektra, 1983)
- Radio M.U.S.C. Man (Elektra, 1985)

With Stevie Woods

- Take Me to Your Heaven (Cotillion, 1981)

With Bobby Womack

- Safety Zone (United Artists, 1975)
- The Poet (Beverly Glen Music, 1981)
- The Poet II (Beverly Glen Music, 1984)
- So Many Rivers (MCA, 1985)
- Someday We'll All Be Free (Beverly Glen, 1985)

With Charles Wright & the Watts 103rd Street Rhythm Band

- Express Yourself (Warner Bros., 1970)
- You're So Beautiful (Warner Bros., 1971)

With Syreeta Wright

- Rich Love, Poor Love (Motown, 1977)
- One to One (Motown, 1977)
- Set My Love in Motion (Motown, 1981)

With Michael Wycoff

- Love Conquers All (RCA Records, 1982)
- On the Line (RCA Records, 1983)

With Richard "Popcorn" Wylie

- Extrasensory Percepition (ABC, 1974)

== Bibliography ==
- Vincent, Rickey (1996). Funk: The Music, The People, and The Rhythm of The One. New York: St. Martin's Griffin. ISBN 0-312-13499-1. LCCN 95-32678. OCLC 1035141873.
