= Sweet Harmony =

Sweet Harmony may refer to:

- "Sweet Harmony" (Liquid song), 1992
- "Sweet Harmony" (The Beloved song), 1993
- Sweet Harmony (album), a 1976 album by Maria Muldaur
- "Sweet Harmony", a 2013 song by Slow Knights from the album Cosmos
- "Sweet Harmony", a 1973 song by Smokey Robinson from the album Smokey
