= Touch the Sky (Smokey Robinson album) =

Studio album by Smokey Robinson
- Released: 1983
- Recorded: 1982–1983 at Golden Sound Studios (Hollywood, California)
- Genre: R&B, soul
- Label: Motown
- Producer: Smokey Robinson and Reginald "Sonny" Burke

Smokey Robinson chronology
Yes It's You Lady (1982)	Touch the Sky (1983)	Essar (1984)

Touch the Sky is the eleventh studio album by American singer-songwriter Smokey Robinson, released in 1983. It was produced and arranged by Robinson with Reginald "Sonny" Burke, and recorded and mixed at Golden Sound Studios, Inc., Hollywood, California. The album was released on the Motown sub-label Tamla.

== Reception ==
Professional ratings
Review scores
Source	Rating
AllMusic	2/5 stars
The Rolling Stone Album Guide	3.5/5 stars

The album peaked at #50 on Billboard pop charts, and at #8 on R&B charts.

There were two singles released from this album. "I've Made Love to You A Thousand Times" peaked at #101 Billboard and #8 R&B charts, "Touch The Sky" at #110 Billboard and #68 R&B charts.

Robert Christgau gave the album a B+, giving a special recommendation to "cheating-song fans."

== Track listing ==
=== Side A ===
1. "Touch the Sky" (William "Smokey" Robinson) - 5:45
2. "Gimme What You Want" (Marvin Tarplin, William "Smokey" Robinson) - 4:00
3. "Even Tho'" (Forest Hairston) - 3:47
4. "Gone Again" (William "Smokey" Robinson) - 3:40

=== Side B ===
1. "All My Life's a Lie" (William "Smokey" Robinson) - 3:58
2. "Sad Time" (Scott D. Getlin, Stephen D. Tavani) - 4:21
3. "Dynamite" (Berry Gordy, William "Smokey" Robinson) - 4:37
4. "I've Made Love to You A Thousand Times" (Marvin Tarplin, William "Smokey" Robinson) - 5:38

== Personnel ==
Fellow Miracles members Claudette Robinson, then Smokey's wife, joins for background vocals on the title track, Marv Tarplin is featured on rhythm guitar and songwriting. Also featured are Robinson regulars Fred Smith and Michael Jacobsen (since A Quiet Storm – 1975), and Sonny Burke (since Smokey's Family Robinson – 1976). On "Dynamite" Robinson shares songwriting-credits with Berry Gordy, founder of Motown records (besides everything else).

- Smokey Robinson – lead vocals, backing vocals
- Reginald "Sonny" Burke – keyboards, synthesizers (1, 2, 5, 7, 8), drums (1, 2, 4–8)
- Paul Fox – synthesizer programming (1, 2, 7, 8)
- Michael Boddicker – synthesizer programming (5, 7)
- Charles Fearing – guitars (1, 5–7)
- Marvin Tarplin – guitars (2, 8)
- David T. Walker – guitars (4–7)
- Paul Jackson, Jr. – guitars (7)
- James Jamerson, Jr. – bass (1, 7)
- Scott Edwards – bass (2, 6)
- Nathan East – bass (3–5, 8)
- James Gadson – backing vocals (1), drums (4, 8)
- Paulinho da Costa – percussion (1, 2, 5, 7)
- Fred Smith – flute (5, 8)
- Ernie Watts – flute (6), saxophone (6, 7)
- Chuck Berghofer, Michael Jacobsen, Gareth Nuttycombe and David Schwartz – strings (3)
- Harry Bluestone – concertmaster (3)
- George Annis – music contractor
- Ivory Davis – backing vocals (1)
- Brenda Lee Eager – backing vocals (1)
- Patricia Henley – backing vocals (1)
- Claudette Robinson – backing vocals (1)
- James Sledge – backing vocals (1)
- Leon Ware – backing vocals (1)

=== Production ===
- Produced and Arranged by William "Smokey" Robinson, Jr. and Reginald "Sonny" Burke.
- Recording Engineer – Paul Ring
- Technical Engineer – Robert Biles
- Assistant Engineer – Gary Jaye
- Mixing – Gary Jaye, Paul Ring, William "Smokey" Robinson, Jr. and Reginald "Sonny" Burke.
- Mastered by Wally Traugott at Capitol Records (Hollywood, California).
- Album Coordinator – Randy Dunlap
- Art Direction – Johnny Lee and Terry Taylor
- Cover Photography – David Alexander
- Sleeve Photography – Sheri Hyatt
- Sleeve Photo Montage – Sarah Sakakibara
- Sleeve Design – Alana Coghlan
