= Now and Then (Smokey Robinson album) =

Studio album by Smokey Robinson
- Released: 2010
- Genre: Soul
- Length: 52:31
- Language: English
- Label: Saguaro Road Records

Smokey Robinson chronology
Time Flies When You're Having Fun (2009)	Now and Then (2010)	Smokey & Friends (2014)

Now and Then is the twenty-first studio album by American singer-songwriter Smokey Robinson, released in 2010. The album has received negative reviews from critics. The release was an exclusive at American restaurant Cracker Barrel and features six live recordings six alongside tracks from Robinson's 2009 release Time Flies When You're Having Fun.

== Reception ==
Editors of AllMusic Guide scored this release two out of five stars, with reviewer Stephen Thomas Erlewine criticizing "the too-crisp, too-hollow synths and Smokey’s notably diminished vocal range", summing up that they are "not terrible performances but they’re not noteworthy".

== Track listing ==
All songs written by Smokey Robinson, except where noted.

1. "Time Flies" – 4:59
2. "Won't Know Why" (Jesse Harris) – 3:54
3. "Girlfriend" – 4:25
4. "One Time" – 4:46
5. "That Place" – 4:53
6. "Love Bath" – 5:33
7. "Going to a Go-Go" (Warren "Pete" Moore, Robinson, and Robert Rogers) – 3:14
8. "I Second That Emotion" (Al Cleveland and Robinson) – 2:28
9. "Ooo Baby Baby" (Moore and Robinson) – 5:23
10. "The Tears of a Clown" (Henry Cosby, Robinson, and Stevie Wonder) – 2:24
11. "Being with You" – 5:44
12. "The Tracks of My Tears" (Moore, Robinson, and Marvin Tarplin) – 4:48

== Personnel ==
- Smokey Robinson – vocals

== Chart performance ==
Time Flies When You're Having Fun reached 19 on Billboard's Top R&B/Hip-Hop Albums and 131 on the Billboard 200.

== See also ==
- List of 2010 albums
