= Smokin' (Smokey Robinson album) =

Live album by Smokey Robinson
- Released: October 31, 1978
- Genre: R&B
- Label: Tamla
- Producer: Smokey Robinson; Berry Gordy, Mike & Brenda Sutton on Track 15.

Smokey Robinson chronology
Love Breeze (1978)	Smokin' (1978)	Where There's Smoke... (1979)

Professional ratings
Review scores
Source	Rating
AllMusic	3/5 stars
The Rolling Stone Album Guide	3/5 stars

Smokin' is a Smokey Robinson live album released in 1978.

== Track listing ==
1. "The Tracks of My Tears"
2. "Love So Fine"
3. "Baby That's Backatcha"
4. "The Agony and the Ecstasy"
5. "Quiet Storm"
6. "Why You Wanna See My Bad Side"
7. "Daylight and Darkness"
8. "Madam X"
9. "The Tears of a Clown"
10. "Bad Girl/You Can Depend on Me"
11. "Here I Go Again"
12. "Mickey's Monkey"
13. "You Really Got a Hold on Me"
14. "Shoe Soul"
15. "I Second That Emotion"
16. "Ooo Baby Baby"
17. "Vitamin U"
18. "Baby Come Close"

== Personnel ==
- Smokey Robinson – lead vocals
- Reginald "Sonny" Burke – keyboards
- Ron Rancifer – keyboards
- Marv Tarplin – guitars
- Wah Wah Watson – guitars
- James Jamerson – bass guitar
- Wayne Tweed – bass guitar
- Scotty Harris – drums
- James "Alibe" Sledge – congas, backing vocals
- Ivory Stone Davis – kettledrums, timpani, backing vocals
- Fred Smith – saxophone, flute
- Michael Jacobsen – saxophone, cello
- Patricia Henley – backing vocals

== Production ==
- Producers – Smokey Robinson (All tracks); Berry Gordy, Mike and Brenda Sutton (Track 15).
- Recording Engineers – Wally Heider and Russ Terrana
- Sound Engineers – Michael Lizzio and Danny Muldoon.
- Mixing – Michael Lizzio and Smokey Robinson
- Mix Assistant – Ernestine Madison
- Sound Coordinator – Randy Dunlap
- Mastered by Jack Andrews
- Mixed and Mastered at Motown Recording Studios (Los Angeles, CA).
- Product Manager – Brenda M. Boyce
- Art Direction and Design – Norm Ung
- Lettering – Debbie Ross
- Photography – Bob Holland (front cover) and Neil Zlozower (back cover/inside).
- Wardrobe Coordinator – Barbara Ramsey
