= Smokey & Friends =

Studio album by Smokey Robinson
- Released: August 19, 2014
- Genre: R&B, pop
- Length: 42:34
- Label: Verve
- Producer: Randy Jackson

Smokey Robinson chronology
| Now and Then (2010) | Smokey & Friends (2014) | Christmas Everyday (2017) |

Professional ratings
Aggregate scores
| Source | Rating |
|---|---|
| Metacritic | 55/100 |
Review scores
| Source | Rating |
| AllMusic | 2/5 stars |
| Mojo | 3/5 stars |

Smokey & Friends is the twenty-second studio album by American singer-songwriter Smokey Robinson. It was released in August 2014 under Verve Records. Reaching No. 12 on Billboard's album chart, it stands as Smokey's second most successful solo album.

== Track listing ==
| No. | Title | Writer(s) | Length |
|---|---|---|---|
| 1. | "The Tracks of My Tears" (featuring Elton John) | Warren Moore; Smokey Robinson; Marvin Tarplin | 3:27 |
| 2. | "You Really Got a Hold on Me" (featuring Steven Tyler) | Robinson | 3:25 |
| 3. | "My Girl" (featuring Aloe Blacc, JC Chasez, Miguel) | Robinson; Ronald White | 4:31 |
| 4. | "Cruisin'" (featuring Jessie J) | Robinson; Tarplin | 4:53 |
| 5. | "A Quiet Storm" (featuring John Legend) | Rose Ella Jones; Robinson | 4:55 |
| 6. | "The Way You Do (The Things You Do)" (featuring Cee Lo Green) | Robinson; Robert Rogers | 3:34 |
| 7. | "Being with You" (featuring Mary J. Blige) | Robinson | 4:15 |
| 8. | "Ain't That Peculiar" (featuring James Taylor) | Moore; Robinson; Rogers; Tarplin | 3:47 |
| 9. | "The Tears of a Clown" (featuring Sheryl Crow) | Henry Crosby; Robinson; Stevie Wonder | 3:23 |
| 10. | "Ooh Baby Baby" (featuring Ledisi) | Moore; Robinson | 3:00 |
| 11. | "Get Ready" (featuring Gary Barlow) | Robinson | 3:21 |

== Personnel ==
Lead vocalists

- Smokey Robinson (also backing vocals on 2)
- Elton John (1)
- Steven Tyler (2, also backing vocals)
- Aloe Blacc (3)
- JC Chasez (3)
- Miguel (3)
- Jessie J (4)
- John Legend (5)
- CeeLo Green (6)
- Mary J. Blige (7)
- James Taylor (8)
- Sheryl Crow (9)
- Ledisi (10)
- Gary Barlow (11)

Musicians and backing vocalists

- Wayne Linsey – keyboards (1, 5, 9)
- Chris Walden – synth strings (1), string arrangements (1)
- James "Big Jim" Wright – keyboards (2–4, 6, 7, 9)
- Jim Cox – Hammond B3 organ (2, 6, 11), acoustic piano (6), synth strings (6, 11)
- Theron Feemster – programming (3–7, 11), keyboards (6), synth horns (6), drums (10)
- Raymond Angry – keyboards (4)
- Loris Holland – keyboards (4)
- John Legend – acoustic piano (5)
- Jeff Babko – keyboards (5, 9), synth flutes (5), synth strings (5), string arrangements (5)
- Sason Sotoodehfar – programming (7, 11)
- Larry Goldings – Wurlitzer electric piano (8), organ (8)
- Raul Ferrando – synth strings (9)
- Tim Pierce – guitars (1–3, 5–7, 9–11)
- Doc Powell – guitars (1, 3, 5, 7, 9, 10)
- Phil X – guitars (2)
- John Mayer – guitar solo (3)
- Randy Bowland – guitars (4, 10)
- John Shanks – guitar solo (4)
- James Taylor – acoustic guitar (8)
- Michael Landau – electric guitar (8)
- Cornelius Mims – bass (1, 5, 9)
- Randy Jackson – bass (2, 3, 6, 10, 11)
- Mark Kelley – bass (4)
- Jimmy Johnson – bass (8)
- James Gamble – drums (1, 2, 5, 9)
- Jim Keltner – drums (8), percussion (8)
- Questlove – drums (10)
- Roger Squitero – tambourine (8)
- Beate Walden – violin (1)
- Songa Lee – violin (5)
- Terron Brooks – backing vocals (1, 2, 4, 6, 7, 10)
- Nicole Scherzinger – backing vocals (2)
- Mischke Butler – backing vocals (3, 5–7, 9–11)
- Sharlotte Gibson – backing vocals (4–7)
- Sarah West – backing vocals (5)
- Sheree Brown – backing vocals (11)

== Charts ==
=== Weekly charts ===
| Chart (2014) | Peak position |
|---|---|
| US Billboard 200 | 12 |
| US Top R&B/Hip-Hop Albums (Billboard) | 2 |

=== Year-end charts ===
| Chart (2014) | Position |
|---|---|
| US Top R&B/Hip-Hop Albums (Billboard) | 56 |
