= There Will Come a Day =

There Will Come a Day may refer to:

- There Will Come a Day (album), an album by Shirley Myers
- There Will Come a Day (film), a 2013 Italian drama film
- "There Will Come a Day", a song by Faith Hill from Breathe
- "There Will Come a Day (I'm Gonna Happen to You)", a song by Smokey Robinson from Deep in My Soul

See also

- "There Will Be a Day", a 2008 song by Jeremy Camp
