= Yes It's You Lady =

Studio album by Smokey Robinson
- Released: 1982
- Recorded: November–December, 1981 at Studio Sound Recorders (North Hollywood, California)
- Genre: R&B, Soul
- Label: Motown
- Producer: George Tobin in association with Mike Piccirillo

Smokey Robinson chronology
Being with You (1981)	Yes It's You Lady (1982)	Touch the Sky (1983)

Yes It's You Lady is the tenth studio album by American singer-songwriter Smokey Robinson, released in 1982. As with 1981's Being with You, it was produced by George Tobin in association with Mike Piccirillo and recorded and mixed at Studio Sound Recorders, North Hollywood, California. It was released on the Motown sub-label Tamla.

== Reception ==
Professional ratings
Review scores
Source	Rating
AllMusic	2/5 stars

The album peaked at #33 in Billboard pop charts, and at #6 on the R&B charts. The two follow-up singles to 1981's chart success' "Being with you" were notably not Robinson compositions: "Tell Me Tomorrow" peaked at #33 Billboard and #3 R&B charts, "Old Fashioned Love" at #60 Billboard and #17 R&B charts. The third and final single, Robinson's "Yes It's You Lady" only peaked at #107 Billboard, without entering the R&B charts.

Robert Christgau rated the album as B, praising Robinson's mature voice and singing, while complaining about the weakness of the "material". Concluding with "he almost gets away with it anyway".

== Track listing ==
=== Side A ===
1. "Tell Me Tomorrow" (Gary Goetzman, Mike Piccirillo) - 6:25
2. "Yes It's You Lady" (William "Smokey" Robinson) - 4:43
3. "Old Fashioned Love" (Gary Goetzman, Mike Piccirillo) - 3:12
4. "Are You Still Here" (William "Smokey" Robinson) - 2:33

=== Side B ===
1. "The Only Game In Town" (Gary Goetzman, Mike Piccirillo) - 4:50
2. "International Baby" (William "Smokey" Robinson) - 4:07
3. "Merry-Go-Ride" (Richard Williams) - 5:31
4. "I'll Try Something New" (William "Smokey" Robinson) - 3:34
5. "Destiny" (Forest Hairston) - 3:48

== Personnel ==
- Smokey Robinson – lead and backing vocals
- Bill Cuomo – keyboards
- Mike Piccirillo – synthesizers, guitars, bells, backing vocals
- Marv Tarplin – rhythm guitar (2, 7, 8)
- Scott Edwards – bass
- Ed Greene – drums
- Howard Lee Wolen – percussion
- Joel Peskin – saxophones
- David Stout – trombone
- Harry Kim – trumpet
- Bobby Bruce – violin
- Ivory Davis – backing vocals
- Claudette Robinson – backing vocals
- Julia Waters Tillman – backing vocals
- Maxine Waters Willard – backing vocals
- Yvonne Wilkins – backing vocals

=== Production ===
- Produced by George Tobin for George Tobin Productions, Inc.
- Associate Producer – Mike Piccirillo
- Production Coordinators – Allan Rinde and Theresa Abrook
- Arranged and mixed by George Tobin and Mike Piccirillo
- Engineers – Howard Lee Wolen and Mark Wolfson
- Assistant Engineers – Ira Rubnitz, John Volaitis and Richie Griffin.
- Mastered by Ken Perry at Capitol Records (Hollywood, CA).
- Album Coordinator – Barbara Ramsey
- Art Direction – Johnny Lee
- Artwork Design – Ginny Livingston
- Photography – David Alexander
