= Love Breeze =

Studio album by Smokey Robinson
- Released: 1978
- Label: Motown
- Producer: Smokey Robinson, Jerry Butler, Homer Talbert III, Mike & Brenda Sutton

Smokey Robinson chronology
Big Time (1977)	Love Breeze (1978)	Smokin' (1978)

Love Breeze is the sixth studio album by the American musician Smokey Robinson, released in 1978. It was arranged by Sonny Burke. It peaked at No. 75 on the Billboard 200.

== Critical reception ==
Professional ratings
Review scores
Source	Rating
AllMusic	4/5 stars
The Rolling Stone Album Guide	3/5 stars

The Bay State Banner determined that "Smokey is content to master today's wah-wah-ing and orchestral perfumery, as his production stretches the music so thin it nearly breaks: soloists' one-notes stand as alone as Smokey's voice." In 2011, The New Yorker wrote: "The record has uncomfortable duds, like 'Shoe Soul', which takes a pedestrian pun to absurd lengths, but also songs like 'Daylight and Darkness', which poses a number of increasingly pointed questions about a lover's mood swings. The music is smooth, easy listening unless you're really listening."

== Track listing ==
Side one

1. "Why You Wanna See My Bad Side" (Smokey Robinson, Janie Bradford) - (3:45)
2. "Love So Fine" (Smokey Robinson) - (4:34)
3. "Feeling You, Feeling Me" (Homer Talbert, Jerry Butler) - (3:52)
4. "Madam X" (words: Smokey Robinson; music: Marv Tarplin) - (6:28)

Side two

1. "Shoe Soul" (words: Smokey Robinson; music: Mike Sutton, Brenda Sutton) - (4:41)
2. "Trying It Again" (Smokey Robinson, Richard Williams) - (4:53)
3. "Daylight and Darkness" (Smokey Robinson, Rose Ella Jones) - (4:00)
4. "I'm Loving You Softly" (Kennis Jones) - (4:29)

== Personnel ==
- Smokey Robinson – lead and backing vocals
- John Barnes, Sylvester Rivers – keyboards
- James Bradford – bass piano
- Reginald "Sonny" Burke – keyboards, arrangements (1, 2, 4–8)
- Ronnie McNeir – Fender Rhodes
- Fred Ross – organ
- Michael Sutton – keyboards, clavinet
- Marlo Henderson, Rick Littlefield, Marvin Tarplin, Wah-Wah Watson, David T. Walker – guitar
- Scott Edwards, James Jamerson, Chuck Rainey, David Shields, Wayne Tweed – bass guitar
- James Gadson, Ed Greene, Scotty Harris – drums
- Paulinho da Costa – percussion
- James Sledge – congas, backing vocals
- Bob Zimmitti – percussion, vibraphone
- Fred Smith – flutes, reeds, solos
- Michael Jacobsen – cello
- Bob "Boogie" Bowles – arrangements (3)
- Kim Richmond – horn arrangements (5)
- Arthur G. Wright – rhythm and string arrangements (5)
- Melba Bradford – backing vocals
- Cheryl Cooper – backing vocals
- Ivory Davis – backing vocals
- Patricia Henley – backing vocals
- Jesse Richardson – backing vocals
- Claudette Robinson – backing vocals
- Brenda Sutton – backing vocals

Production

- Producers – Smokey Robinson (Tracks 1, 2, 4, 6, 7 & 8); Jerry Butler and Homer Talbert (Track 3); Mike and Brenda Sutton (Track 5)
- Engineers – Don Boehret, Michael Lizzio, Barney Perkins, Bob Robitaille, Michael Schuman, Art Stewart and Art White.
- Assistant Engineer – James Warmack
- Recorded at Motown Recording Studios (Hollywood, CA); ABC Recording Studios (Los Angeles, CA); Kendun Recorders (Burbank, CA).
- Mixed by Russ Terrana
- Mastered by Jack Andrews
- Mixed and Mastered at Motown Recording Studios (Hollywood, CA).
- Art Direction and Design – Wriston Jones
- Illustration – Brian Zick
