= Food for the Spirit (album) =

Studio album by Smokey Robinson
- Released: 2004
- Studio: Creative Source (Woodland Hills, California)
- Genre: Gospel music
- Length: 44:21
- Language: English
- Label: Liquid 8
- Producer: Michael Stokes

Smokey Robinson chronology
Intimate (1999)	Food for the Spirit (2004)	My World (The Definitive Collection) (2005)

Food for the Spirit is the eighteenth studio album by American singer-songwriter Smokey Robinson, released in 2004. The album marks his first gospel album, departing from his typical soul music work. The album received mixed reception and Robinson returned to soul after this release. The album also marks the second album not to be released by Motown (following Double Good Everything in 1991), instead being released by Liquid 8 Records.

== Reception ==
Editors at AllMusic Guide scored this release 2.5 out of five stars, with critic Thom Jurek calling it "a slick, very contemporary soul-gospel recording" and that Robinson has a "still gorgeous voice", but the performance competes with the production. Writing in Rolling Stone, Bud Scoppa gave this release three out of five stars, praising Robinson's vocals, but decrying "heavy-handed social commentary".

== Track listing ==
All songs written by Smokey Robinson

1. "Jesus Told Me to Love You" – 5:55
2. "Let Your Light Shine On Me" – 4:41
3. "The Road to Damascus" – 5:34
4. "Standing On Jesus" – 3:19
5. "He Can Fix Anything" – 3:50
6. "I Have Prayed On It" – 5:48
7. "Gang Bangin'" – 5:02
8. "I Praise & Worship You Father" – 4:29
9. "We Are the Warriors" – 5:43

== Personnel ==
- Smokey Robinson – vocals
- Michael Stokes – keyboards, acoustic piano, programming, arrangements, horn and string arrangements
- D'Andre Franklin – keyboards, acoustic piano, programming, horn and string arrangements
- Clint Stokes III – keyboards, acoustic piano, programming
- Kelvin Thomas – keyboards
- Sydney Stokes – guitars
- Rick Whitfield – guitars
- Andrew Gouche – bass guitar
- Alexandra Brown – backing vocals
- Carmen Carter – backing vocals
- Louis Price – backing vocals
- Jacquelyn L. Similey – backing vocals
- Oren Waters – backing vocals

=== Production ===
- Michael Stokes – producer, engineer, mixing
- D'Andre Franklin – associate producer, assistant engineer, mix assistant
- Clint Stokes III – associate producer
- Khaliq Glover – assistant engineer, mix assistant
- Bernie Grundman – mastering at Bernie Grundman Mastering (Hollywood, California)
- Sherman Keith Hill – art supervision
- Deja Daije and SKH – artwork, design
- Christina M. Lopez and SKH – art direction

== Chart performance ==
Food for the Spirit reached 44 on Billboard's Top R&B/Hip-Hop Albums.

== See also ==
- List of 2004 albums
