= Big Time (soundtrack) =

Soundtrack album by Smokey Robinson
- Released: June 28, 1977
- Recorded: 1976–1977
- Genre: R&B
- Label: Motown
- Producer: Smokey Robinson

Smokey Robinson chronology
Deep in My Soul (1977)	Big Time (1977)	Love Breeze (1978)

Professional ratings
Review scores
Source	Rating
Allmusic	link
Christgau's Record Guide	B−

Big Time is a Smokey Robinson soundtrack album released on June 28, 1977 for the film of the same name. It was arranged by Ronnie McNeir and Sonny Burke with Melvin "Wah Wah" Watson credited for guitar.

== Track listing ==
All songs written by William "Smokey" Robinson, except where noted.

1. "Theme from Big Time" - 9:31
2. "J.J.'s Theme" - 0:35
3. "Hip Trip" (Robinson, Janie Bradford) - 4:46
4. "He is the Light of the World" - 2:11
5. "So Nice to be with You" (Robinson, Rose Ella Jones) - 6:29
6. "Shana's Theme" with dialogue - 0:13
7. "If We're Gonna Act Like Lovers" (Robinson, Kennis Jones) - 5:19
8. "The Agony and the Ecstasy" - 2:34
9. "Theme from Big Time (Reprise)" - 2:20
