= Gasms =

Studio album by Smokey Robinson
- Released: April 28, 2023
- Genres: Soul; R&B
- Length: 40:41
- Language: English
- Label: TLR
- Producers: David Garfield; Gary Gold; Leon Lacy; Ivri Lider; Steve Luxenberg; Amon Nehesi; Smokey Robinson; Cory Rooney

Smokey Robinson chronology
Christmas Everyday (2017)	Gasms (2023)	What the World Needs Now (2025)

When people think of gasms, they think of orgasms first and foremost ... I tell everybody: 'Whatever your gasm is, that's exactly what I'm talking about.'

— Smokey Robinson on the meaning of the album title and its conceptual focus

Gasms is the twenty-fourth studio album by American singer-songwriter Smokey Robinson, released on April 28, 2023, by TLR Records. It was the first album of all-new material from Robinson since 2009. A concept album about sex and other forms of pleasure, the release has received controversy for its title and themes, as well as positive critical assessment. The song lyrics and titles include several sexual connotations.

== Recording, release, and promotion ==
Robinson worked on the music on this album for five or six years prior to release and worked intimately with J. J. Blair to mix the album. Sessions included songs that Robinson had written up to 20 years prior. Gasms was announced in January 2023 and was accompanied by the lead single "If We Don't Have Each Other"; "How You Make Me Feel" followed as a single. The album was released on April 28, 2023 by TLR Records. Robinson also toured behind the release.

== Reception ==
Professional ratings
Review scores
Source	Rating
AllMusic	2.5/5 stars
Pitchfork	7.2/10

Public reception of the album and song titles resulted in controversy and disbelief, as reported by Blavity and The Root, particularly since Robinson is known for milder romantic songs, rather than explicitly about sex. Although his wife and stepdaughter tried to talk him out of it, Robinson wanted to stir up controversy with the title, but interprets "gasms" as not only orgasms, but "anything that makes you feel good". His goal was to initiate controversy and curiosity about the music to encourage listeners to engage with it.

For NPR's All Songs Considered, critics Ayana Contreras, Christina Lee, Hazel Cills, and Robin Hilton highlighted this album as one of the best releases of the week. Contreras points out the sparse mixing and gentle singing that Robinson displays, allowing the strength of his vocals to shine on the recording. Editors of AllMusic Guide scored this release 2.5 out of five stars, with critic Andy Kellman praising the "humorously raunchy" tone present on some tracks among "a collection of clean and pleasant love songs" as well as the "low-key" instrumentation that complements his voice. Evan Rytlewski of Pitchfork gave this album a 7.2 out of 10, noting that Robinson is one of the very few musicians to remain vital into his eighties and "an indelible talent" who has "made the kind of record only he can".

== Track listing ==
All songs written by Smokey Robinson except where noted.

No.	Title	Writer(s)	Length
1.	"Gasms"		4:24
2.	"How You Make Me Feel"		4:28
3.	"I Wanna Know Your Body"	Gary Gold; Ivri Lider; Robinson	4:23
4.	"I Keep Callin' You"		4:03
5.	"Roll Around"		4:24
6.	"Beside You"	Junior Denby	4:34
7.	"If We Don't Have Each Other"	Steve Luxenberg; Amon Nehesi; Robinson	4:19
8.	"You Fill Me Up"		4:19
9.	"I Fit in There"		5:47
Total length:			40:41

== Personnel ==
Personnel adapted from AllMusic Guide.

- Smokey Robinson – vocals, mixing, production
- Brandon Behymer – engineering
- Karrie Benoit-Morales – vocals
- Bill Bergman – saxophone
- J. J. Blair – engineering, mixing
- Rick Braun – trumpet
- Brandon Brown – bass guitar
- Gorden Campbell – drums
- Eric Erickson – engineering
- Steve Ferrone – drums
- Chuck Findley – trumpet
- Brian French – engineering, mixing
- David Garfield – keyboards, piano, arrangement, string arrangement, production
- Roland Gajate Garcia – percussion
- Sharlotte Gibson – vocals
- Gary Gold – keyboards, drum programming, engineering, production
- James Harrah – guitar
- Kenya Hathaway – vocals
- Dorian Holley – vocals
- Paul Jackson, Jr. – guitar
- Leon Lacey – keyboards, drum programming, production
- Nick Lane – string arrangement
- Ivri Lider – keyboards, production
- Ricky Lawson – drums
- Steve Luxenberg – instrumentation, production
- Amon Nehesi – instrumentation, production
- Khari Parker – drums
- Ray Parker, Jr. – guitar
- Cory Rooney – keyboards, arrangement, drum programming, production
- Steve Sykes – engineering
- Freddie Washington – bass guitar
- David Williams – guitar
- Joe Zook – mixing

== Chart performance ==
Gasms spent one week on the Billboard Top Current Album Sales chart, placing 61 on May 13, 2023 and "If We Don't Have Each Other" peaked at 28 in six weeks on the Adult R&B Airplay chart.

== See also ==
- List of 2023 albums
