= Mike & Brenda Sutton =

Musical group

- Origin: United States
- Genres: Soul; boogie; dance-pop
- Years active: 1978–1984
- Labels: SAM Records (US); Virgin Records (UK)
- Past members: Michael B. Sutton and Brenda Sutton

Mike & Brenda Sutton was an American musical duo composed of Michael B. Sutton and Brenda Sutton. The duo are best known for both their songwriting-production work at Motown and their own recordings in the early 1980s, including the dance song "Don't Let Go of Me (Grip My Hips and Move Me)" as remixed by Shep Pettibone.

Discovered by Stevie Wonder, both became writers and producers at Motown Records, working there from 1974 to 1979. The duo produced numerous hits at the label, most notably "There Will Come a Day" by Smokey Robinson, "Stay with Me" by Jermaine Jackson, as well as songs by the group Switch. They are the recipients of one gold and two platinum albums for their work.

After leaving Motown they partnered with long-time friend Cheryl Lynn and wrote the Ray Parker-produced top 5 R&B hit "Shake It Up Tonight". The Suttons also recorded two albums of their own, Don't Hold Back in 1982, and So Good in 1984, scoring several R&B and dance hits. They later worked with Ian Levine for his Motown revival project and recorded the track "No Other Love".

== History ==
Back in the early 1970s, Michael B. Sutton wrote numerous songs for Motown artists including Thelma Houston, Smokey Robinson, Jermaine Jackson, and the Supremes.

Michael Sutton and Brenda Sutton were originally members of a disco/R&B group called Finished Touch. Together with Finished Touch, they recorded a few songs for the Motown label including "Need to Know You (Better)" and "I Love to See You Dance". After the band broke up in 1979, they signed to Sam Records and recorded the soul-tinged boogie-funk songs "Don't Let Go of Me" and "We'll Make It". Both songs entered the Billboard Club Play Singles chart, reaching numbers 37 and 49, respectively.

== Discography ==
=== Studio albums ===
Year	Album
1982	Don't Hold Back
1984	So Good

=== Singles ===
Year	Song	Label	Peak chart position
Year	Song	Label	U.S. Dance
1982	"We'll Make It"	SAM	49
1982	"Don't Let Go of Me"	SAM	37
1982	"Don't Hold Back"	SAM	—
1984	"Kraazy"	Rocshire	—
1984	"Live It Up (Love It Up)"	Rocshire	—
"—" denotes a single that did not chart or was not released in that region.
