= Where There's Smoke... =

Studio album by Smokey Robinson
- Released: May 22, 1979
- Recorded: 1978–1979
- Genre: Soul, disco
- Length: 35:06
- Label: Tamla
- Producer: Smokey Robinson, Jerry Butler, Stevie Wonder, Homer Alexander Talbert III

Smokey Robinson chronology
Smokin' (1978)	Where There's Smoke... (1979)	Warm Thoughts (1980)

Where There's Smoke... is the seventh studio album by American singer-songwriter Smokey Robinson, released on May 22, 1979, by Motown Records' Tamla label. It contains his Billboard Top 10 pop hit single "Cruisin'".

== Critical reception ==
Professional ratings
Review scores
Source	Rating
Christgau's Record Guide	A−
Smash Hits	6/10

Reviewing for The Village Voice in 1980, music critic Robert Christgau gave the album an "A−" and called it Robinson's best solo album. He said that, despite potential "cavils" from novice Motown purists about the disco version of "Get Ready", the songs on side one especially update Robinson's "concise, smoldering romanticism with a flair that seemed lost to him years ago". Stereo Review magazine's Phyl Garland commended him for remaining an unadorned composer and producer, and cleverly underplaying several tracks' "disco flavor". She found the songs pleasurable and consistent, and remarked that, although it may not be a milestone in Robinson's career, Where There's Smoke is "solid, ingratiating music that should wear well." Dave Marsh did view it as a turning point and "genuine creative breakthrough" for Robinson, who finally modernizes his style of soul music without "being compromised." Marsh also felt that he has matured as a vocalist, because of how he immerses his voice around rhythms and tries phrasings that were less evident in his early music. Red Starr, writing in Smash Hits, gave the album a mixed review and described it as "pleasant if tame and unremarkable stuff".

In a retrospective review, AllMusic's William Ruhlmann said that it may be inconsistent and slightly too "disco-ish in places," even though it restored Robinson's commercial viability. The Mojo Collection (2007) was more enthusiastic and wrote that Robinson had "hit a new vein of excellence" with Where There's Smoke..., "the most vibrant album he'd yet made, climaxing with the gorgeous hit, 'Cruisin''."

== Track listing ==
All tracks composed by Smokey Robinson, except where noted.

Side one - Smoke

1. "It's a Good Night" - 5:46
2. "I Love the Nearness of You" (Robinson, Stevie Wonder) - 4:30
3. "The Hurt's on You" (Lawrence Hanks, Rodney Massey) - 4:16
4. "Ever Had a Dream" (Robinson, Janie Bradford) - 3:47

Side two - Fire

5. "Get Ready" - 5:46
6. "Share It" - 4:58
7. "Cruisin'" (Robinson, Marv Tarplin) - 5:53

== Personnel ==
- Smokey Robinson – lead vocals
- Cheryl Cooper, Ivory Davis, Paula Dickerson, Patricia Henley Talbert, Bernard Ighner, Claudette Robinson, Smokey Robinson, James Sledge and Charles Wright – backing vocals

Musicians (Tracks 1 & 4–7)

- Reginald "Sonny" Burke – arrangements
- Reginald "Sonny" Burke, Ronnie McNeir, Ron Rancifer – keyboards
- Paul Jackson Jr., Rick Littlefield, Marv Tarplin, David T. Walker, Wah Wah Watson, Robert White – guitar
- Larry Davis, Chuck Rainey, Wayne Tweed – bass guitar
- James Gadson, Scotty Harris – drums
- Eddie "Bongo" Brown, James Sledge – bongos, congas
- Jack Ashford, Ivory Davis – tambourine
- Fred Smith – alto saxophone, flute, flute solos
- Michael Jacobsen – horns, strings

Track 2

- Stevie Wonder – rhythm arrangements
- Paul Riser – string arrangements
- Greg Phillinganes – Fender Rhodes
- Michael Sembello, Rick Zunigar – guitar
- Nathan Watts – bass guitar
- Dennis Davis – drums

Track 3

- Robert Bowles, Terry Fryer, Paul David Wilson – arrangements
- Terry Fryer, Lawrence Hanks, Roger Harris – keyboards
- Bryan Gregory, Danny Leake – guitar
- Bernard Reed – bass guitar
- Brian Grice – drums
- Reginald "Sonny" Burke – cowbell, spoon

== Production ==
- Producers – Smokey Robinson (Tracks 1, 2, & 4–7); Stevie Wonder (Track 2); Jerry Butler and Homer Talbert III (Track 3); Reginald "Sonny" Burke (Track 5).
- Engineers – Roger Dollarhide, Cal Harris and Michael Lizzio.
- Assistant Engineer – Gail Ritter
- Mixing – Michael Lizzio and Smokey Robinson
- Mix Assistants – Randy Dunlap and Gail Ritter
- Product Manager – Brenda M. Boyce
- Project Coordinator – Billie Jean Brown
- Art Direction – John Calbaka
- Design – Ginny Livingston
- Cover Photography – Claude Mougin

== Charts ==
=== Weekly charts ===
Chart (1979–1980)	Peak position
US Billboard 200	17
US Top R&B/Hip-Hop Albums (Billboard)	8

=== Year-end charts ===
Chart (1980)	Position
US Billboard 200	54
US Top R&B/Hip-Hop Albums (Billboard)	11

=== Singles ===
Single	Chart	Position
"Get Ready"	U.S. Billboard Hot R&B Singles	82
"Cruisin'"	U.S.Billboard Hot 100	4
"Cruisin'"	U.S. Billboard Adult Contemporary	34
"Cruisin'"	U.S. Billboard Hot R&B Singles	4
