= Warm Thoughts =

Studio album by Smokey Robinson
- Released: 1980
- Genre: R&B
- Label: Motown
- Producer: Smokey Robinson, Stevie Wonder

Smokey Robinson chronology
Where There's Smoke... (1979)	Warm Thoughts (1980)	Being with You (1981)

Warm Thoughts is the eighth studio album by the American musician Smokey Robinson, released in 1980. It features the top 40 hit, "Let Me Be The Clock". The album was arranged by Reginald "Sonny" Burke. This album also featured the semi-autobiographical tune "Wine, Women and Song", which proved to be the closest thing to a Miracles reunion that occurred in the 1980s, with Smokey doing a duet with his then-wife, former Miracle Claudette Robinson, and Miracle Marv Tarplin, with whom he shared songwriting credits, on guitar. The song "Travelin' Thru'" was written by Smokey's real-life sister, Rose Ella Jones, and "Melody Man" was written by Robinson with fellow Motown artist, Stevie Wonder. This album was a success, reaching the Top 20 of The Billboard 200 Pop Album chart, peaking at No. 14, and the Top 10 of Billboard's R&B Album Chart, peaking at No. 4.

== Critical reception ==
Professional ratings
Review scores
Source	Rating
AllMusic	3/5 stars
Billboard	(unrated)
Rolling Stone	(favorable)

The Boston Globe wrote that "Robinson's silky smooth tenor glides over a collection of eight cuts, most lush, heavily orchestrated ballads."

== Track listing ==
All tracks composed by Smokey Robinson, except where indicated.

1. "Let Me Be the Clock" - 5:10
2. "Heavy on Pride" - 4:07
3. "Into Each Rain Some Life Must Fall" (Doris Fisher, Allan Roberts) - 4:34
4. "Wine, Women and Song" (Robinson, Marv Tarplin, Pamela Moffett) - 4:45
5. "Melody Man" (Robinson, Stevie Wonder) - 4:53
6. "What's in Your Life for Me" (Robinson, Donny Soul) - 4:43
7. "I Want to Be Your Love" - 3:57
8. "Travelin' Thru'" (Rose Ella Jones) - 4:22

== Personnel ==
- Smokey Robinson – lead and backing vocals
- Reginald "Sonny" Burke – keyboards, arrangements (1–4, 6, 7, 8)
- Ron Rancifer – keyboards
- Marlo Henderson – guitars
- Melvin Ragin – guitars
- Marv Tarplin – guitars
- Phil Upchurch – guitars
- David T. Walker – guitars
- Keni Burke – bass
- Scott Edwards – bass
- Wayne Tweed – bass
- James Gadson – drums
- Scotty Harris – drums
- James Sledge – congas, backing vocals
- Fred Smith – flute, reeds, solos
- Michael Jacobson – cello
- Stevie Wonder – arrangements (5)
- Cheryl Cooper – backing vocals
- Ivory Davis – backing vocals
- Patricia Henley Talbert – backing vocals
- Claudette Robinson – backing vocals, lead vocals (4)

Production

- Producer – Smokey Robinson
- Co-Producer on Track 5 – Stevie Wonder
- Production Assistant – Randy Dunlap
- Engineer – Michael Lizzio
- Assistant Engineers – Ernestine Madison and Ginny Pallante
- Mixing – Michael Lizzio and Smokey Robinson
- Mix Assistants – Randy Dunlap and Ginny Pallante
- Mastered by John Matousek
- Recorded, Mixed and Mastered at Motown Recording Studios (Hollywood, CA).
- Recording Coordinator – Barbara Ramsey
- Talent Coordinator – Simone Sheffield
- Art Direction and Design – Ginny Livingston
- Cover Photo – Ron Slenzak
- Lettering – Vigon/Nahas/Vigon
