= Time Flies When You're Having Fun =

Studio album by Smokey Robinson
- Released: August 25, 2009
- Genre: Soul
- Length: 57:25
- Language: English
- Producer: Brian French; Gary Gold

Smokey Robinson chronology
Timeless Love (2006)	Time Flies When You're Having Fun (2009)	Now and Then (2010)

Time Flies When You're Having Fun is the twentieth studio album by American singer-songwriter Smokey Robinson, released in 2009. The release coincided with Robinson's 50th anniversary as a musician, with a return to the classic quiet storm sound that he pioneered in the 1970s and has received positive reviews from critics.

== Critical reception ==
Editors of AllMusic Guide scored this album three out of five stars, with critic Stephen Thomas Erlewine considering this album "a return to the coolly simmering quiet storm that was his stock in trade during the '70s and '80s" with "impeccably tailored vocals". Writing for Rolling Stone, Mark Kemp gave this album three out of five stars, noting the singer's "sterling tenor". In the Culture Desk segment of The New Yorker, this album was named Album of the Week, with the review opining "it’s not advisable to say that it’s good or bad, at least not in simple terms", as Robinson's quiet storm sound and vocals are always high quality. Lloyd Bradley of BBC News noted not only the singing, but Robinson's songwriting, exhorting readers to "take any one of this set’s 12, beautifully-crafted vignettes that deal with just about every aspect of love – lost, found, enjoyed, unrequited and so on – telling stories in a way that will mean something to just about anybody". Mikeal Wood of Billboard gave this album four out of five stars, calling this "mellow vintage-soul disc that finds the Motown maestro in remarkably fine voice as he flexes his signature falsetto over supple, unhurried live-band arrangements long on tasty licks and laid-back grooves".

== Track listing ==
All songs written by Smokey Robinson, except where noted

1. "Time Flies" – 4:59
2. "Don't Know Why" (Jesse Harris) – 3:54
3. "Girlfriend" – 4:26
4. "You're the One for Me" – 5:05
5. "One Time" – 4:48
6. "Please Don't Take Your Love" – 4:50
7. "That Place" – 4:54
8. "Love Bath" – 5:33
9. "Whatcha Gonna Do" (Terrence Bolden and Jeffrey Freeman) – 5:19
10. "Satisfy You" (Gary Gold) – 4:46
11. "You're Just My Life" – 4:09
12. "I Want You Back" (Deke Richards, Berry Gordy, Fonce Mizell, and Freddie Perren) – 4:43

== Personnel ==
- Smokey Robinson – vocals
- India.Arie – vocals on "You're Just My Life"
- Brian French – production
- Gary Gold – production
- Carlos Santana – guitar on "Please Don't Take Your Love"
- Joss Stone – vocals on "You're the One for Me"

== Chart performance ==
Time Flies When You're Having Fun reached 10 on Billboard's Top R&B/Hip-Hop Albums and 59 on the Billboard 200.

== See also ==
- List of 2009 albums
