= Intimate (Smokey Robinson album) =

Studio album by Smokey Robinson
- Released: 1999
- Recorded: 1999
- Studio: Creative Source (Woodland Hills, California); West Grand Media (West Hollywood, California); Chartmaker (Malibu, California); Barking Doctor (Mount Kisco, New York)
- Genre: R&B, soul
- Label: Motown
- Producer: Michael Stokes; Berry Gordy; Michael Lovesmith; David Foster

Smokey Robinson chronology
Double Good Everything (1991)	Intimate (1999)	Food for the Spirit (2004)

Intimate is the seventeenth studio album by American singer-songwriter Smokey Robinson, released in 1999 on Motown Records. The album rose to No. 28 on the Billboard Top R&B/Hip-Hop Albums chart.

It was nominated for a Grammy Award for Best Traditional R&B Vocal Performance.

== Overview ==
The album was his first in over seven years and marked a return to Motown Records. Artists such as The Emotions and Gerald Albright guested on the album.

The album had two singles: "Easy to Love" and "Sleepin' In". Music videos were made for both singles.

== Critical reception ==
Professional ratings
Review scores
Source	Rating
AllMusic	2.5/5 stars

Alan Light for Vibe feels the album relies "too heavily on dated synthesizer washes and 'romantic' tinkly percussion", but Robinson's voice is "just as lovely, just as pure and clean, as ever." Andrew Hamilton of AllMusic doesn't think Intimate rates with his albums from the 1970s, calling the results "merely adequate" but says it "is a fine comeback by Mr. Motown."

== Track listing ==
All tracks composed by Smokey Robinson and Michael Stokes; except where indicated.

1. "Sleepin' In" – 4:07
2. "Easy to Love" (Smokey Robinson) – 4:30
3. "Love Love Again" (David Foster, Junior Miles, Bruce Roberts) – 4:12
4. "Intimate" – 4:36
5. "I'm the One" (Berry Gordy, Jr., Michael Lovesmith) – 4:02
6. "Just Let Me Love You" (Berry Gordy, Jr., Michael Lovesmith) – 4:04
7. "All of Mine" – 3:50
8. "The Bottom Line" – 3:54
9. "Feelings Flowing" – 4:13
10. "Ready to Roll" (Berry Gordy, Jr., Michael Lovesmith) – 3:48
11. "Tu Me Besas Muy Rico" – 5:13
12. "Intimate" (Reprise) – 1:22

== Personnel ==
- Smokey Robinson – lead vocals, backing vocals
- Michael Stokes – keyboards, synthesizer programming, drum programming, percussion
- Michael Lovesmith – keyboards, synthesizer programming, drum programming, backing vocals
- Donny Nguyen – keyboards, synthesizer programming, drum programming
- Carl Rowan – keyboards, synthesizer programming, drum programming
- Clint Stokes III – keyboards, synthesizer programming, drum programming
- DeAndre Franklin – synthesizer programming, drums
- David Foster – keyboards (3), arrangements (3)
- Simon Franglen – Synclavier programming (3)
- Charles Fearing – guitars
- Paul Jackson Jr. – guitars
- Marlon McClain – guitars
- Michael Thompson – guitars (3)
- Paulinho da Costa – percussion
- Gerald Albright – saxophones
- Sylvia Cox – backing vocals
- Patricia Henley – backing vocals
- Robert Henley – backing vocals
- Ronald Henley – backing vocals
- Jeanette Hutchinson – backing vocals
- Sheila Hutchinson – backing vocals
- Wanda Hutchinson – backing vocals
- Denise Parker – backing vocals
- Linda Stokes – backing vocals
- Ivory Stone – backing vocals
- Joey Diggs – backing vocals (3)
- Ricky Jones – backing vocals (3)
- Jeff Pescetto – backing vocals (3)

Production

- Berry Gordy – executive producer, producer (5, 6, 10), arrangements (5, 6, 10)
- Michael Stokes – producer (1, 2, 4, 7–9, 11), arrangements (1, 2, 4, 7–9, 11), recording (1, 2, 4–11), mixing (1, 2, 4–11)
- Michael Lovesmith – associate producer (1, 2, 4, 7–9, 11), producer (5, 6, 10), arrangements (5, 6, 10), recording (5, 6, 10)
- DeAndre Franklin – associate producer (1, 2, 4, 7–9, 11)
- Donny Nguyen – associate producer (1, 2, 4, 7–9, 11)
- Carl Rowan – associate producer (1, 2, 4, 7–9, 11)
- Clint Stokes III – associate producer (1, 2, 4, 7–9, 11)
- David Foster – producer (3), arrangements (3)
- Felipe Elgueta – engineer (3)
- Ed Goodreau – assistant engineer (3)
- Mick Guzauski – mixing (3)
- David Boucher – mix assistant (3)
- Bernie Grundman – mastering at Bernie Grundman Mastering (Hollywood, California)
- Cheryl Jackson – production assistant (5, 6, 10)
- Petter Design – design
- James Hicks at Deborah Martin Agency – photography
