= Love, Smokey =

Studio album by Smokey Robinson
- Released: 1990
- Recorded: 1990
- Genre: R&B, soul
- Label: Motown
- Producer: Paul Laurence: Keith Andes; Larry Hatcher, Berry Gordy; Michael Stokes; Dennis Lambert; Fritz Cadet; Howard King, Iris Gordy; Robbie Buchanan; Smokey Robinson; George Duke; Leon Sylvers III

Smokey Robinson chronology
One Heartbeat (1987)	Love, Smokey (1990)	Double Good Everything (1991)

Professional ratings
Review scores
Source	Rating
People	(favourable)

Love, Smokey is the fifteenth studio album by American R&B singer-songwriter Smokey Robinson, released in 1990. Love, Smokey was the follow-up to Robinson's most successful album One Heartbeat. The first single was "Everything You Touch" which reached No. 2 on the Adult Contemporary chart. Stevie Wonder plays harmonica on the track "Easy".

== Track listing ==
1. "Love Is the Light" (David Ritz, Fred White, Kelly McNulty, Smokey Robinson) – 5:18
2. "(It's The) Same Old Love" (Brenda Madison, Ken Gold) – 4:45
3. "Love 'n Life" (Jeff Pescetto, Reed Vertelney) – 4:59
4. "I Can't Find" (Smokey Robinson) – 4:07
5. "Take Me Through the Night" (Pam Reswick, Steve Werfel) – 3:54
6. "Everything You Touch" (Pam Reswick, Steve Werfel) – 4:14
7. "Don't Wanna Be Just Physical" (Fritz Cadet, Howard King, Smokey Robinson) – 5:03
8. "Come to Me Soon" (Smokey Robinson) – 4:38
9. "You Made Me Feel Love" (Dave Loggins, Jon Goin) – 4:08
10. "Jasmin" (Smokey Robinson) – 4:28
11. "Easy" (Marv Tarplin, Smokey Robinson) – 4:40
12. "Just Another Kiss" (Scott Cutler, Roy Freeland) – 3:33 (CD Bonus track)
13. "Unless You Do It Again" (Smokey Robinson) – 3:36 (CD Bonus track)

== Personnel ==
- Smokey Robinson – lead vocals, arrangements (10, 11)
- Paul Laurence – keyboards (1), Audio Frame programming (1), backing vocals (1), arrangements (1)
- Darryl Sheppard – keyboards (1), AudioFrame programming (1)
- Keith Andes – keyboards (2, 3), drum programming (2, 3), percussion (2, 3), arrangements (2, 3), backing vocals (3)
- Johnny Davis – keyboards (2, 3), backing vocals (3)
- Larry Hatcher – keyboards (2, 3), percussion (2, 3), backing vocals (2, 3), arrangements (2, 3), BGV arrangements (2, 3)
- Michael Stokes – keyboard (4), arrangements (4)
- Johnny Allen – synthesizers (4)
- William Bryant – acoustic piano (4), synthesizers (4)
- Michael Rochelle – programming (4)
- Claude Gaudette – keyboards (5, 6), synthesizers (5, 6), arrangements (5, 6), bass (12)
- Fritz Cadet – keyboards (7), arrangements (7)
- Howard King – keyboards (7), drum programming (7), arrangements (7)
- Robbie Buchanan – keyboards (8, 12), synthesizers (8, 12), arrangements (8, 12)
- George Duke – arrangements (9–11), Yamaha TX816 Rhodes (9–11), Roland D-550 (9, 11), Synclavier (9–11), Yamaha DX7 (10), synthesizer effects (10), marimba (10), percussion (10), vibraphone (11)
- Jeff Fargus – keyboards (13), computer programming (13), arrangements (13)
- Tommy Organ – guitars (3)
- David Williams – guitars (4)
- Teddy Castellucci – guitars (5, 6)
- Michael Landau – guitars (8, 12), lead guitar (9)
- Paul Jackson Jr. – rhythm guitar (9), guitars (10, 12)
- Sheldon Reynolds – guitars (11)
- Marv Tarplin – guitars (11)
- Freddie Washington – bass (4, 9–11)
- Leon Sylvers III – bass (13), drum programming (13), arrangements (13)
- Tim Cornwell – drum programming (2)
- James Gadson – drums (4)
- John Robinson – drums (9, 10)
- Ricky Lawson – drums (11)
- Gary Coleman – percussion (4)
- Paulinho da Costa – percussion (4, 8)
- Terry Santiel – percussion (4)
- Luis Conte – percussion (5, 6)
- Romeo Stone – percussion (13)
- Felix Ramos – alto saxophone (2)
- Gerald Albright – saxophone (4), alto saxophone (9)
- Dave Boruff – saxophone (6)
- Kenny G – saxophone (12)
- Stevie Wonder – harmonica (11)
- Iris Gordy – BGV arrangements (2)
- Dennis Lambert – BGV arrangements (5, 6)
- Janice Dempsey – backing vocals (1)
- Joyce Vincent Wilson – backing vocals (2)
- Pamela Vincent – backing vocals (2)
- Michael Campbell – backing vocals (3)
- Abe Hatcher – backing vocals (3)
- Jackie Bell – backing vocals (4)
- Patricia Henley – backing vocals (4–6, 8, 11–13)
- Linda Stokes – backing vocals (4)
- Ivory Stone – backing vocals (4–6, 8, 11–13)
- Jeff Pescetto – backing vocals (5, 6, 12)
- Sandra St. Victor – backing vocals (7)
- Carmen Twillie – backing vocals (8)
- Mark Kibble – backing vocals (9)
- Claude V. McKnight III – backing vocals (9)
- David Thomas – backing vocals (9)
- Mervyn Warren – backing vocals (9)
- Alexandra Brown – backing vocals (11)
- Robert Henley – backing vocals (13)

Production

- Executive Producer – Iris Gordy
- Producers – Paul Laurence (Track 1); Keith Andes and Larry Hatcher (Tracks 2 & 3); Berry Gordy and Michael Stokes (Track 4); Dennis Lambert (Tracks 5 & 6); Fritz Cadet and Howard King (Track 7); Robbie Buchanan, Iris Gordy and Smokey Robinson (Tracks 8 & 12); George Duke (Tracks 9–11); Leon Sylvers III (Track 13).
- Associate Producer on Track 4 – Michael Rochelle
- Engineers – Ron Banks and Steve Goldman (Track 1); Eric Camp (Track 2); Al Phillips (Tracks 2 & 3); Warren Woods (Track 4); Doug Rider (Tracks 5 & 6); Fil Brown and Stephen Seltzer (Track 7); Steve MacMillan (Tracks 7 & 8); Jeff Balding and Ian Eales (Tracks 8 & 12); Erik Zobler (Tracks 9–11); Frank Wolf (Track 12); Derek Marcil (Track 13).
- Assistant Engineers – Randy Long (Tracks 2 & 3); Claudio Ordenas and Jeff Poe (Tracks 5 & 6); Andy Batwinas, Kyle Bess, Paula Max Garcia and Leroy Quintyn (Track 7); Kevin Fisher, Mitch Gibson, Steve Holroyd and Tom Perry (Tracks 9–11).
- Recorded at Giant Sound and Science Lab (New York, NY); Soundcastle, Hollywood Sound Recorders, Le Gonks West, Creative Source Studios and Summa Studios (Hollywood, CA); O'Henry Sound Studios (Burbank, CA); The Hop and Ocean Way Recording (Los Angeles, CA).
- Mixing – Ron Banks (Track 1); Gary Dobbins (Tracks 2 & 3); Brian Malouf (Track 4–6); Taavi Mote (Tracks 7 & 13); Erik Zobler (Tracks 8–11); Doug Rider (Track 12)
- Mixed at Ocean Way Recording, Elumba Recording and Lion Share Studios (Los Angeles, CA); Larrabee Sound Studios and Pacifique Recording Studios (Hollywood, CA); Can-Am Recorders (Tarzana, CA).
- Mastered by Steve Hall at Future Disc (Hollywood, CA).
- Production Assistants – Karla Dawn Bristol (Karla Gordy Bristol), Sharon Burston, D. Dee Click, Stephanie McCravey and Marriane L. Pellicci.
- Art Direction – Jeff Adamoff
- Design – Michael Diehl
- Photography – Randee St. Nicholas
- Wardrobe – Rick Pollack

== Charts ==
=== Weekly charts ===
Chart (1990)	Peak position
US Billboard 200	112
US Top R&B/Hip-Hop Albums (Billboard)	23

=== Year-end charts ===
Chart (1990)	Position
US Top R&B/Hip-Hop Albums (Billboard)	93
