= Being with You (album) =

Being With You

Studio album by Smokey Robinson
- Released: February 17, 1981
- Recorded: November 1980 – January 1981
- Studio: Studio Sound Recorders (North Hollywood, California); Motown Recording Studios (Los Angeles, California)
- Genre: R&B, soul
- Length: 32:38
- Label: Motown
- Producer: George Tobin in association with Mike Piccirillo

Smokey Robinson chronology
Warm Thoughts (1980)	Being With You (1981)	Yes It's You Lady (1982)

Professional ratings
Review scores
Source	Rating
AllMusic	3/5 stars
Rolling Stone	4/5 stars

Being With You is the ninth studio album by American singer-songwriter Smokey Robinson, released on February 17, 1981. It is one of the few Smokey Robinson solo albums that have been released in the CD format. It features the million-selling, Gold-certified single title track "Being With You", which hit #1 on the Cash Box Top 100. It just missed the #1 Pop position in Billboard, peaking at #2, making it Robinson's highest-charting solo hit after leaving the Miracles. It was also #1 for five consecutive weeks on the R&B Chart and for two weeks on the UK Singles Chart.

Smokey's first wife, fellow Miracles member Claudette Robinson, contributed background vocals to this album. This album has been Certified Gold by the RIAA. . It eventually sold over 900,000 copies in the United States.

== Track listing ==
All tracks composed by Smokey Robinson; except where indicated.

1. "Being With You" – 4:06
2. "Food For Thought" – 4:10
3. "If You Wanna Make Love (Come 'Round Here)" – 3:31
4. "Who's Sad" (Gary Goetzman, Mike Piccirillo) – 3:42
5. "Can't Fight Love" (Gary Goetzman, Mike Piccirillo) – 5:57
6. "You Are Forever" – 4:27
7. "As You Do" (Peter Kingsbery) – 3:13
8. "I Hear The Children Singing" (Forest Hairston) – 3:41

== Charts ==
Chart (1981)	Peak position
Australia (Kent Music Report)	71

== Personnel ==
- Smokey Robinson – lead vocals, backing vocals
- Bill Cuomo – keyboards (1–6, 8)
- Mike Piccirillo – synthesizers (1–6, 8), organ (1–6, 8), guitars (1–6, 8), additional keyboards (2), percussion (2), steel drums (2)
- Reginald "Sonny" Burke – keyboards (7), arrangements (7)
- Ronnie Rancifer – keyboards (7)
- Paul Jackson Jr. – guitars (7)
- Scott Edwards – bass (1–6, 8)
- Robert "Pops" Popwell – bass (7)
- Ed Greene – drums (1–6, 8)
- James Gadson – drums (7)
- Scotty Harris – drums (7)
- Howard Lee Wolen – percussion (1–6, 8)
- Mark Wolfson – percussion (1–6, 8)
- Joel Peskin – saxophones
- David Strout – trombone
- Harry Kim – trumpet
- George Tobin – arrangements (1–6, 8)
- Ivory Davis – backing vocals
- Patricia Henley – backing vocals
- Robert John – backing vocals
- Claudette Robinson – backing vocals
- Julia Waters Tillman – backing vocals
- Maxine Waters Willard – backing vocals

== Production ==
- Producers – George Tobin (Tracks 1–6 & 8); Smokey Robinson and Michael Lizzio (Track 7).
- Associate Producer – Mike Piccirillo for George Tobin Productions, Inc. (Tracks 1–6 & 8).
- Production Coordination – Lisa Marie (Tracks 1–6 & 8)
- Project Managers – Randy Dunlap and Barbara Ramsey (Track 7)
- Engineers – Howard Lee Wolen and Mark Wolfson (Tracks 1–6 & 8); Michael Lizzio (Track 7).
- Assistant Engineers – Richie Griffin (Tracks 1–6 & 8); Ginny Pallante (Track 7).
- Mixing – George Tobin and Mike Piccirillo (Tracks 1–6 & 8); Michael Lizzio (Track 7).
- Mastering by John Lemay at Capitol Mastering (Hollywood, CA).
- Art Direction – Johnny Lee
- Design – Ginny Livingston
- Photography – Gary Heery
