= Timeless Love (album) =

Studio album by Smokey Robinson
- Released: June 20, 2006
- Studio: Center Staging (Burbank, California)
- Genre: Funk, soul, pop
- Length: 55:50
- Label: New Door
- Producer: Smokey Robinson

Smokey Robinson chronology
| My World (The Definitive Collection) (2005) | Timeless Love (2006) | Time Flies When You're Having Fun (2009) |

Timeless Love is the nineteenth studio album by American singer-songwriter Smokey Robinson, released through New Door Records in 2006. It reached No. 109 on the Billboard album chart. In 2007, the album was nominated for but did not win a Grammy Award for Best Traditional Pop Vocal Album.

== Track listing ==
=== Standard edition ===
1. "You Go to My Head" (John Frederick Coots, Haven Gillespie) – 4:31
2. "I'm in the Mood for Love/Moody's Mood for Love" (Dorothy Fields, Jimmy McHugh) – 5:05
3. "Our Love Is Here to Stay" (George Gershwin, Ira Gershwin) – 5:29
4. "Fly Me to the Moon (In Other Words)" (Bart Howard) – 3:20
5. "Night and Day" (Cole Porter) – 5:51
6. "I'm Glad There Is You" (Jimmy Dorsey, Paul Mertz) – 3:40
7. "More Than You Know" (Edward Eliscu, Billy Rose, Vincent Youmans) – 3:17
8. "Speak Low" (Ogden Nash, Kurt Weill) – 4:09
9. "Time After Time" (Cahn, Rob Hyman, Styne) – 5:10
10. "I Can't Get You Anything But Love (Baby)" (Fields, McHugh) – 2:49
11. "I Love Your Face" (Smokey Robinson) – 2:56
12. "I've Got You Under My Skin" (Porter) – 4:29
13. "Tea for Two" (Irving Caesar, Youmans) – 5:04

=== Target edition ===
- All thirteen tracks from standard edition
- Bonus tracks
1. "You're In My Me" (Robinson) – 4:34
2. "Happy" (Robinson, Michel Legrand) – 4:46
3. "Smokey Robinson Interview" – 5:42

== Personnel ==
- Smokey Robinson – vocals, additional arrangements
- Reginald "Sonny" Burke – acoustic piano, vibraphone, string arrangements and conductor
- David Garfield – keyboards, additional arrangements
- Bob "Boogie" Bowles – guitars
- Paul Jackson Jr. – guitars
- Ken Rosser – guitars
- Marvin Tarplin – guitars
- Phil Upchurch – guitars
- Larry Ball – bass, additional arrangements
- Freddie Washington – bass
- Gary Gold – drums
- Ricky Lawson – drums
- Tony Lewis – drums, additional arrangements
- Paulinho da Costa – percussion
- Ken Gioffre – saxophones, flute
- Bobby Shew – trumpet
- Los Angeles Strings Orchestra – strings
- Harold Wheeler – additional arrangements
- Bill Hughes – string contractor, copyist

=== Production ===
- Smokey Robinson – producer, additional mixing
- Gary Gold – recording, mixing, production consultant
- Brian French – additional mixing, production consultant, production manager, art direction
- Bernie Grundman – mastering at Bernie Grundman Mastering (Hollywood, California)
- Harry Weinger – A&R coordinator
- Adam Abrams – production manager
- Mickey Cevallos – photography
- Meire Murakami – design
