= Christmas Everyday =

Studio album by Smokey Robinson
- Released: 2017
- Genre: Soul, Christmas music
- Language: English

Smokey Robinson chronology
Smokey & Friends (2014)	Christmas Everyday (2017)	Gasms (2023)

Christmas Everyday is the twenty-third studio album and first Christmas album from American singer-songwriter Smokey Robinson, released in 2017 as an exclusive work by Amazon.com.

== Reception ==
Entertainment Weekly briefly recommended the album twice: critic Eric Renner Brown rated it an A−, calling this set "as warm and inviting as a fireside mug of hot cocoa" and Sarah Weldon included it in a run-down of 17 holiday albums for readers to put on their playlists.

== Track listing ==
1. "Santa Claus Is Coming to Town"
2. "This Christmas"
3. "The Christmas Song"
4. "White Christmas"
5. "Silent Night"
6. "The Night That Baby Was Born"
7. "Please Come Home for Christmas"
8. "Christmas Everyday"
9. "You're My Present"
10. "O Holy Night"

== Personnel ==
- Smokey Robinson – vocals
- Mindi Abair – saxophone on "Silent Night"
- The Dap-Kings – backing band on "You're My Present"
- Trombone Shorty – horn on "Santa Claus Is Coming to Town"
- Take 6 – vocals on "O Holy Night"
- Us the Duo – vocals on "Christmas Everyday"

== Chart performance ==
Christmas Everyday spent one week on the Billboard Independent Album chart, placing 33 on December 30, 2017.
