= Pure Smokey =

Studio album by Smokey Robinson
- Released: March 15, 1974
- Recorded: September–December 1973
- Genre: Soul, funk
- Length: 39:29
- Label: Tamla
- Producer: Smokey Robinson

Smokey Robinson chronology
Smokey (1973)	Pure Smokey (1974)	A Quiet Storm (1975)

Professional ratings
Review scores
Source	Rating
AllMusic	4.5/5 stars
Creem	C+

Pure Smokey is the second studio album by American singer-songwriter Smokey Robinson. It was released on March 15, 1974, by Tamla Records. It features the single "Virgin Man." Several songs were written by Robinson with fellow Miracle Marv Tarplin, who left the group a year after Robinson's departure to join him in California and assist him in his solo projects.

== Track listing ==
All tracks are produced by Smokey Robinson; except "A Tattoo".

All tracks arranged by Russ Turner, Gene Page and Smokey Robinson; except where indicated.

1. "It's Her Turn to Live" (Robinson, Marvin Tarplin) - 3:15
2. "The Love Between Me and My Kids" (Robinson) - 2:52
3. "Asleep on My Love" (Robinson, Tarplin) - 3:58
4. "I Am I Am" (Robinson) - 3:53
5. "Just Passing Through" (Tarplin, Janie Bradford, Al Cleveland) - 3:17
6. "Virgin Man" (Robinson, Rose Ella Jones) - 5:07
7. "She's Only a Baby Herself" (Robinson) - 2:47
8. "Fulfill Your Need" (Robinson, Tarplin, Pamela Moffett) - 2:50
9. "A Tattoo" (Robinson) - 4:30

"I Am, I Am" arranged by Smokey Robinson and Gene Page

"A Tattoo" produced and arranged by Smokey Robinson and Willie Hutch

== Personnel ==
- Smokey Robinson – vocals, arranger
- Gene Page – arranger
- Bobbye Hall – percussion
- Henry Davis – bass guitar
- Jeffrey Osborne – drums
- Melvin "Wah Wah" Ragin – guitar
- Russ Turner – keyboards, arranger
- Marvin Tarplin – guitar

Technical

- Bruce Ellison, Jim Hilton, Larry Miles, Russ Terrana, Tom Knox - recording engineers
- Russ Terrana - mixing engineer
- Robert Gleason - design
- Jim Britt - photography
