= Smokey's Family Robinson =

Studio album by Smokey Robinson
- Released: February 10, 1976
- Recorded: 1975
- Genre: Soul
- Label: Tamla; T6-341
- Producer: Smokey Robinson

Smokey Robinson chronology
A Quiet Storm (1975)	Smokey's Family Robinson (1976)	Deep in My Soul (1977)

Professional ratings
Review scores
Source	Rating
AllMusic	2/5 stars
The Encyclopedia of Popular Music	3/5 stars
The Rolling Stone Album Guide	3/5 stars

Smokey's Family Robinson is the fourth studio album by American singer-songwriter Smokey Robinson, released on February 10, 1976, by Tamla Records. The title is a reference to The Swiss Family Robinson.

The album peaked at No. 57 on the Billboard 200.

== Track listing ==
All tracks composed by William "Smokey" Robinson, except where indicated.

1. "When You Came" - 5:24
2. "Get Out of Town" (Robinson, Rose Ella Jones) - 4:43
3. "Do Like I Do" (Robinson, Jones) - 4:40
4. "Open" (Robinson, Marv Tarplin, Pamela Moffett) - 3:50
5. "So in Love" - 4:40
6. "Like Nobody Can" - 4:10
7. "Castles Made of Sand" - 4:49

== Personnel ==
- Smokey Robinson – lead vocals, rhythm arrangements
- Reginald "Sonny" Burke – keyboards, rhythm arrangements
- Marvin Tarplin – guitar, arrangements
- Wayne Tweed – bass guitar, arrangements
- Joseph A. Brown, Jr. – drums, arrangements
- James "Alibe" Sledge – percussion, arrangements
- Michael Jacobsen – electric cello, saxophone, arrangements
- Fred Smith – horns, horn arrangements
- Ivory Stone Davis – backing vocals
- Patricia Henley – backing vocals
- Melba Joyce – backing vocals

There is also a female lead vocal on "Open" and a flute on several tracks; both are uncredited.

Production

- Producer – Smokey Robinson
- Engineers – Guy Costa and Smokey Robinson
- Art Direction – Frank Mulvey
- Photography – Sam Emerson
- Graphics – Gribbit!
