= Double Good Everything =

Studio album by Smokey Robinson
- Released: October 22, 1991
- Studio: Rumbo, Canoga Park; Lion Share, Los Angeles; A&M, Hollywood; Westlake, Los Angeles
- Genre: Soul, pop
- Label: SBK
- Producer: Smokey Robinson

Smokey Robinson chronology
Love, Smokey (1990)	Double Good Everything (1991)	The Ultimate Collection (1997)

Double Good Everything is the sixteenth studio album by the American musician Smokey Robinson, released in 1991. It was his first album to be released by a label other than Motown.

The album peaked at No. 64 on the Billboard Top R&B Albums chart. Its first single was "Double Good Everything", which reached the R&B Top 30.

== Production ==
Nine of Double Good Everything's 10 tracks were written or cowritten by Robinson, who also produced the album. "When a Woman Cries" was written by Joshua Kadison. Robinson worked with his longtime friend, guitar player Marv Tarplin.

== Critical reception ==
Professional ratings
Review scores
Source	Rating
AllMusic	2/5 stars
The Buffalo News	3/5 stars
The Encyclopedia of Popular Music	2/5 stars
Entertainment Weekly	B
MusicHound R&B: The Essential Album Guide	2.5/5 stars
The Rolling Stone Album Guide	3.5/5 stars

Entertainment Weekly called the album "no watershed, just sweet, warm Smokey doing his bit for romantic drive-time inspiration, more courtly than salacious, and slightly teenage in his depictions of love." Stereo Review concluded that "the unifying thread is Robinson's singular voice—almost delicate but unmistakably masculine in its high register, marked by an eternal edge of youthful anticipation." The Kitchener-Waterloo Record opined that, "except for 'Skid Row' and 'When a Woman Cries', Robinson sounds almost uninterested." The Buffalo News wrote that, "though the peaks of his voice may be gone, the gentle emotive stirring is still there."

The Indianapolis Star thought that Robinson's "excellent vocals are underscored by superb instrumentals, particularly on the intimate 'I Love Your Face' and the sashaying 'Rewind' and 'Be Who You Are'." The New Pittsburgh Courier deemed the album "10 new pop/soul gems that are remarkable for retaining the 'Smokey' touch while feeling perfectly contemporary." The Philadelphia Daily News labeled it Robinson's "strongest in years." The Commercial Appeal considered that "Robinson's falsetto is as sweet as ever, as he mixes in a bit of reggae in 'Why', joyously assays the uptempo pop-soul of the title track or croons 'Be Who You Are', a love song that hearkens back to his classic Motown days."

AllMusic wrote: "Though pleasant and inoffensive, this will disappoint even diehard Smokey Robinson fans and won't win him many new ones."

== Track listing ==
All tracks are written by Smokey Robinson; except where noted.

No.	Title	Writer(s)	Length
1.	"Why"		3:55
2.	"Double Good Everything"		3:48
3.	"Rewind"		3:43
4.	"Be Who You Are"		4:33
5.	"I Love Your Face"		2:34
6.	"I Can't Get Enough"		4:19
7.	"Rack Me Back"		4:06
8.	"When a Woman Cries"	Joshua Kadison	3:31
9.	"You Take Me Away"		3:55
10.	"Skid Row"	Robinson; Marvin Tarplin	4:23

== Personnel ==
- Smokey Robinson – vocals
- Christopher Ho – keyboards
- Reginald "Sonny" Burke – acoustic piano, percussion
- Larry Ball – synthesizers, computers, sequencing, bass guitar
- Bob "Boogie" Bowles – acoustic guitars, electric guitars
- Marvin Tarplin – electric guitars
- Torrell Ruffin – guitars (3)
- Robert Palmer – guitar solo (4)
- Tony Lewis – drums, percussion
- David Li – saxophones, electronic wind instrument
- Chris Mostert – baritone saxophone (6), tenor saxophone (9)
- Michael Fell – harmonica (7)
- Ivory Stone – backing vocals
- Patricia Henley – backing vocals
- Robert Henley – backing vocals
- Ronald Henley – backing vocals

Strings (tracks 5 & 8)

- Reginald "Sonny" Burke – arrangements and conductor
- Ron Clark – concertmaster
- Suzie Katayama, David Low and Nancy K. Masaki-Hathaway – cello
- Elizabeth Erman – harp (5)
- Rollice Dale and Robin Ross – viola
- Nicole Bush, Mark Cargill, Pam Gates, Ed Green, Davida Johnson, Gina Kronstadt, Maria Newman, Donald Palmer, Barbra Porter and Marcella Schants – violin

Production

- Smokey Robinson – producer, basic arrangements, cover design
- Dan Bates – associate producer, recording, mixing
- Allan Kaufman – associate producer, recording, mixing
- Guy DeFazio – recording assistant
- Chris Fogel – recording assistant, mix assistant
- Jesse Kanner – recording assistant
- Ed Korengo – recording assistant
- Chad Munsey – recording assistant
- Tom Perez – recording assistant
- Mark Hagen – mix assistant
- Bernie Grundman – mastering at Bernie Grundman Mastering (Hollywood, California)
- Lynn Robb – photography processing
- Bonnie Schiffman – photography
