= Deep in My Soul =

Studio album by Smokey Robinson
- Released: 1977
- Recorded: 1976
- Genre: R&B
- Label: Tamla
- Producer: Lawrence Brown, Michael B. Sutton, Elliot Willensky, Hal Davis, Jeffrey Bowen, Bobby Belle

Smokey Robinson chronology
Smokey's Family Robinson (1976)	Deep in My Soul (1977)	Big Time (1977)

Deep in My Soul is Smokey Robinson's fifth solo album. It was released in 1977.

== Critical reception ==
Professional ratings
Review scores
Source	Rating
AllMusic	3/5 stars
Christgau's Record Guide	B+
The Rolling Stone Album Guide	3/5 stars
The Virgin Encyclopedia of R&B and Soul	3/5 stars

The Los Angeles Times wrote that "Robinson's singing is excellent, but he needs his own first-rate tunes to restore the Miracles sheen." Reviewing in Christgau's Record Guide: Rock Albums of the Seventies (1981), Robert Christgau wrote:

"Smokey has a right to the romanticism that has saturated his solo career—ick with kick has always been his specialty—but I get more from the Big Time soundtrack than from Smokey's Family Robinson. And then there's this, in which various Motown hacks attempt to approximate the bright, direct style of a less mature Smokey and come up with four songs (two of which begin each four-cut side) that actually do so. Whereupon Smokey, pro that he is, sings them as if he wrote them himself."

== Track listing ==
1. "Vitamin U" (Lawrence Brown, Terri McFaddin) – 4:30
2. "There Will Come a Day (I'm Gonna Happen to You)" (Michael B. Sutton, Brenda Sutton, Kathy Wakefield) – 3:54
3. "It's Been a Long Time (Since I Been in Love)" (Elliot Willensky) – 3:43
4. "Let's Do The Dance of Life Together" (Elliot Willensky) – 3:46
5. "If You Want My Love" (Donald Charles Baldwin, Jeffrey Bowen) – 3:45
6. "You Cannot Laugh Alone" (Donald Charles Baldwin, Jeffrey Bowen) – 4:43
7. "In My Corner" (Victor Orsborn, Eric Robinson) – 4:43
8. "The Humming Song (Lost for Words)" (Bobby Belle, Art Posey, Josef Powell) – 3:29

== Personnel ==
- Smokey Robinson – vocals

Technical

- Berry Gordy - executive producer
- Antonín Kratochvíl - photography
