= Baby That's Backatcha =

- German release picture sleeve

Single by Smokey Robinson

from the album A Quiet Storm
- B-side: "Just Passing Through"
- Released: February 17, 1975
- Recorded: 1974
- Studio: Motown
- Genre: R&B
- Length: 3:36
- Label: Tamla
- Songwriter(s): Smokey Robinson
- Producer(s): Russ Turner

Smokey Robinson singles chronology
"I Am I Am" (1975)	"Baby That's Backatcha" (1975)	"The Agony and the Ecstasy" (1975)

"Baby That's Backatcha" is a 1975 single written, produced and performed by Smokey Robinson. From the album, A Quiet Storm, this disco/dance record (also featured on the disco charts) was Robinson's first of two solo (without the Miracles) number ones on the R&B chart and his second Top 40 solo hit peaking at number 26.

== See also ==
- List of number-one R&B singles of 1975 (U.S.)
