= Smokey (album) =

Studio album by Smokey Robinson
- Released: June 19, 1973
- Recorded: 1972–1973
- Studio: Motown Recording Studios (Hollywood, California)
- Genre: Smooth soul, funk
- Length: 39:29
- Label: Tamla
- Producer: Smokey Robinson, Willie Hutch

Smokey Robinson chronology
Smokey (1973)	Pure Smokey (1974)

Smokey is the debut studio album by American soul singer, songwriter, and producer Smokey Robinson. It was released on June 19, 1973, by Tamla Records and was Robinson's first solo record after his departure from The Miracles. The album featured the single "Sweet Harmony", which was his tribute to his former singing partners in the Miracles: Bobby Rogers, Pete Moore and Ronnie White. Smokey was arranged by Dave Blumberg, Gene Page and Willie Hutch. It also featured the song "Baby Come Close", his first solo hit single, and the single "Just My Soul Responding", a protest song dealing with ghetto life in America, and the plight of the American Indian. Smokey peaked at number 70 on the Billboard albums chart, on which it spent 19 weeks.

== Critical reception ==
Professional ratings
Review scores
Source	Rating
AllMusic	4/5 stars
Christgau's Record Guide	B

In a contemporary review of Smokey for Rolling Stone, Vince Aletti said Robinson overcame questionable lyrics on songs such as "Holly" and "Just My Soul Responding" with determined singing and snappy production from Willie Hutch. Aletti went on to write that no one but Robinson could have made "a song based around astrological signs ('The Family Song,' about his own family) or yet another my-girl-and-my-best-friend song ('Silent Partner in a Three-Way Love Affair') work so well". Robert Christgau gave the album a "B" and was somewhat more critical in Creem. He highlighted "Sweet Harmony", "Just My Soul Responding", and "The Family Song", but regarded Smokey as "a good bad record" that revealed Robinson had "somewhere in his heart ... wanted to be Isaac Hayes—and yet somehow he's beyond all his own bullshit". In a retrospective review for AllMusic, Stephen Thomas Erlewine deemed the record "a transitional album, and a fascinating one at that", showcasing Hutch's lavish production and Robinson's ability to incorporate changing trends in music. In Erlewine's opinion, the singer was "naturally favoring smooth soul to gritty funk, letting it escalate to an almost cinematic scale and, more importantly, not shying away from subjects he’d never tackle during the '60s whether it's his family or the saga of a teenage runaway".

== Track listing ==
All tracks composed by Smokey Robinson; except where indicated

1. "Holly" - 4:35
2. Medley: "Never My Love"/"Never Can Say Goodbye" (Don and Dick Addrisi/Clifton Davis) - 3:47
3. "A Silent Partner in a Three-Way Love Affair" (Robinson, Rose Ella Jones) - 4:35
4. "Just My Soul Responding" (Robinson, Marvin Tarplin) - 5:00
5. "Sweet Harmony" - 4:10
6. "Will You Love Me Tomorrow?" (Gerry Goffin, Carole King) - 4:38
7. "Wanna Know My Mind" - 3:43
8. "The Family Song" - 4:30
9. "Baby Come Close" (Robinson, Pamela Moffett, Marvin Tarplin) - 4:57

== Personnel ==
- David Blumberg, Gene Page, Willie Hutch - arrangements
- Art Stewart, Bill MacMeekin, Bruce Ellison, Cal Harris, Eirik W. Wangberg, Larry Miles - recording engineers
- Jim Britt - photography
