= A Quiet Storm =

Studio album by Smokey Robinson
- Released: March 26, 1975
- Recorded: 1974–1975
- Genre: Soul; smooth jazz; quiet storm
- Length: 36:01
- Label: Tamla
- Producer: Smokey Robinson

Smokey Robinson chronology
Pure Smokey (1974)	A Quiet Storm (1975)	Smokey's Family Robinson (1976)

A Quiet Storm is the third solo album by American soul singer, songwriter, and producer Smokey Robinson. Released in March 1975, the album received generally positive reviews, and spawned the hit single "Baby That's Backatcha", which spent one week at the top of the Billboard Hot Soul Singles chart.

According to Pitchfork journalist Eric Harvey, A Quiet Storm revitalized Robinson's career after having left his group the Miracles, and typified what would become known as the quiet storm radio format.

== Critical reception ==
Professional ratings
Review scores
Source	Rating
AllMusic	4.5/5 stars
Christgau's Record Guide	B
MusicHound R&B	4/5 stars
The Rolling Stone Album Guide	3/5 stars

A Quiet Storm is one of the most highly-acclaimed soul albums of the 1970s. This album spawned three hit singles, including Robinson's first disco hit "Baby That's Backatcha", rising to number 7 on the Billboard Disco chart (Top 10 R&B). The album re-established Robinson's reputation as a master songwriter and producer and solidified his solo success after leaving his influential Hall of Fame group, the Miracles.

In a contemporary review for Rolling Stone, Robert Palmer said A Quiet Storm proved Robinson was "still a dynamic creative force" as it succeeded on the strength of his singing and production, although he highlighted the "sexy directness" of the title track and "Baby That's Backatcha". Vince Aletti ranked it as the year's third best album in his ballot for the 1975 Pazz & Jop critics poll. Robert Christgau was less enthusiastic, believing the title track was somewhat bold for concentrating Pure Smokey's "drift into a style", but finding much of the record lacking rhythm, with the exception of "Love Letters" and "Coincidentally".

A Quiet Storm was later named one of the greatest Motown albums of all time in a 1999 edition of Q. According to Pitchfork journalist Eric Harvey, the record reinvented Robinson's brand of "contemplative romantic soul" with the Miracles, revitalized his career after two underperforming solo albums, and typified what would become known as the quiet storm radio format.

Miracles member Marv Tarplin was also a contributor to this album.

In June 2026, CBS News included Quiet Storm in its list of the 250 essential American songs of the past 250 years.

== Track listing ==
All tracks composed and arranged by Smokey Robinson, except where indicated.

1. "Quiet Storm" (Robinson, Rose Ella Jones) 7:47
2. "The Agony and the Ecstasy" 4:46
3. "Baby That's Backatcha" 3:36
4. "Wedding Song" 3:20
5. "Happy" – Love Theme from Lady Sings the Blues (Robinson, Michel Legrand) 7:05
6. "Love Letters" 4:04
7. "Coincidentally" 4:22
- The "Wedding Song" was originally composed for the wedding of Jermaine and Hazel Joy Jackson December 15, 1973.

== Personnel ==
- Smokey Robinson – lead vocals
- Melba Bradford – backing vocals
- Carmen Bryant – backing vocals
- Marv Tarplin – guitar
- James Jamerson – bass
- Joseph A. Brown, Jr. – drums, percussion
- Gary Coleman – percussion
- Shawn Furlong, Terry Furlong – sound effects, sopranino
- Michael Jacobsen – electric cello
- Gene Pello – drums
- James "Alibe" Sledge – bongos, congas, backing vocals
- Fred Smith – horns, woodwind
- Russ Turner – musical arrangements, keyboards, backing vocals

Technical

- Greg Venable, Russ Terrana - mixing engineer
- Katarina Pettersson - art direction
- Jim Britt - photography

== Charts ==
=== Weekly charts ===
Year	Album	Chart positions	
Year	Album	US	US R&B
1975	A Quiet Storm	36	7

=== Year-end charts ===
Chart (1975)	Peak positions
U.S. Billboard Pop Albums	77

=== Singles ===
Year	Single	Chart positions		
Year	Single	US	US R&B	US Dance
1975	"Baby That's Backatcha"	26	1	7
1975	"The Agony and the Ecstasy"	36	7	—
1976	"Quiet Storm"	61	25	—

== See also ==
- List of 1970s albums considered the best
