= Smokey Robinson =

American singer (born 1940)

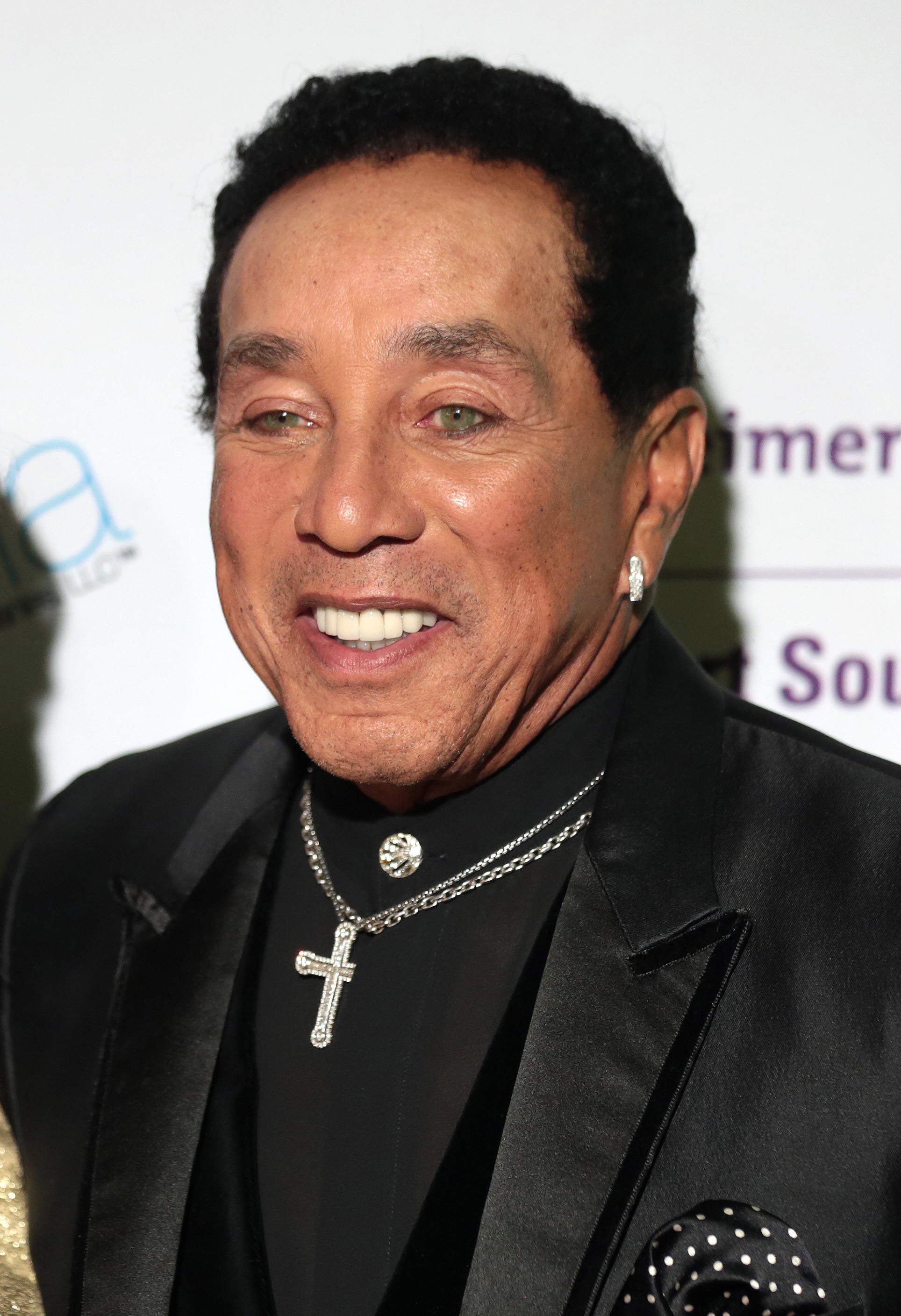
- Robinson in 2018

Background information
- Born: William Robinson Jr. February 19, 1940 (age 86); Detroit, Michigan, U.S.
- Genres: R&B; soul; pop
- Occupations: Singer; songwriter; record producer
- Years active: 1955–present
- Labels: Motown; Universal; SBK; Liquid 8; Robso
- Formerly of: The Miracles
- Spouses: Claudette Rogers (m. 1959; div. 1986); Frances Gladney (m. 2002)
- Website: smokeyrobinson.com

William "Smokey" Robinson Jr. (born February 19, 1940) is an American R&B and soul singer, songwriter, and record producer. He was the founder and frontman of the pioneering Motown vocal group the Miracles, for which he was also chief songwriter and producer. He led the group from its 1955 origins, when they were called the Five Chimes, until 1972, when he retired from the group to focus on his role as Motown Records vice president. Robinson returned to the music industry as a solo artist the following year. He left Motown in 1999.

Robinson was inducted into the Rock and Roll Hall of Fame in 1987 and awarded the 2016 Library of Congress Gershwin Prize for his lifetime contributions to popular music. He is a double Hollywood Walk of Fame Inductee, as a solo artist (1983) and as a member of the Miracles (2009). In 2022, he was inducted into the Black Music & Entertainment Walk of Fame.

== Early life and early career ==
William Robinson Jr. was born on February 19, 1940, to an African-American father and a mother of African-American and French descent, in a poor family in the North End area of Detroit. He had two maternal half-sisters, Rose Ella and Geraldine, and his parents divorced when he was three years old.

Robinson's ancestry is also part Nigerian, Scandinavian, Portuguese, and Cherokee. His uncle Claude gave him the nickname "Smokey Joe" when he was a child. In 2012, Robinson explained:

My Uncle Claude was my favorite uncle. He was also my godfather. He and I were really, really close. He used to take me to see cowboy movies all the time when I was a little boy because I loved cowboy movies. He got a cowboy name for me, which was Smokey Joe. So from the time I was three years old if people asked me what my name was I didn't tell them my name was William, I told them my name was Smokey Joe. That's what everyone called me until I was about 12 and then I dropped the Joe part. I've heard that story about him giving it to me because I'm a light skinned black man but that's not true.

When Robinson was 10, his mother died, and he began living with his older sister, Geraldine, with her husband, who had 10 children together. He attended Northern High School, where he was above average academically and a determined athlete. However, his main interest was music, and he formed a doo-wop group named the Five Chimes. He and Aretha Franklin lived several houses from each other on Belmont; he said he'd known Franklin since she was about five, overhearing her play the piano when he had come to play with her older brother Cecil after her family first moved to Detroit.

Robinson's interest in music started during childhood after he heard the groups Nolan Strong & the Diablos and Billy Ward and his Dominoes on the radio. He has cited Barrett Strong, a Detroit native, as a strong vocal influence. In 1955, he formed the first lineup of the Five Chimes with childhood friend Ronald White and classmate Pete Moore.

Two years later, they were renamed the Matadors and included Bobby Rogers. Another member, Emerson (Sonny) Rogers, Bobby Rogers' cousin, was replaced by his sister, Claudette Rogers (who would marry Smokey Robinson in 1959). The group's guitarist, Marv Tarplin, joined them sometime in 1958. The Matadors began touring Detroit venues around this time. Eventually they changed their name to the Miracles.

== Career ==
=== 1957–1969: The Miracles and Motown ===
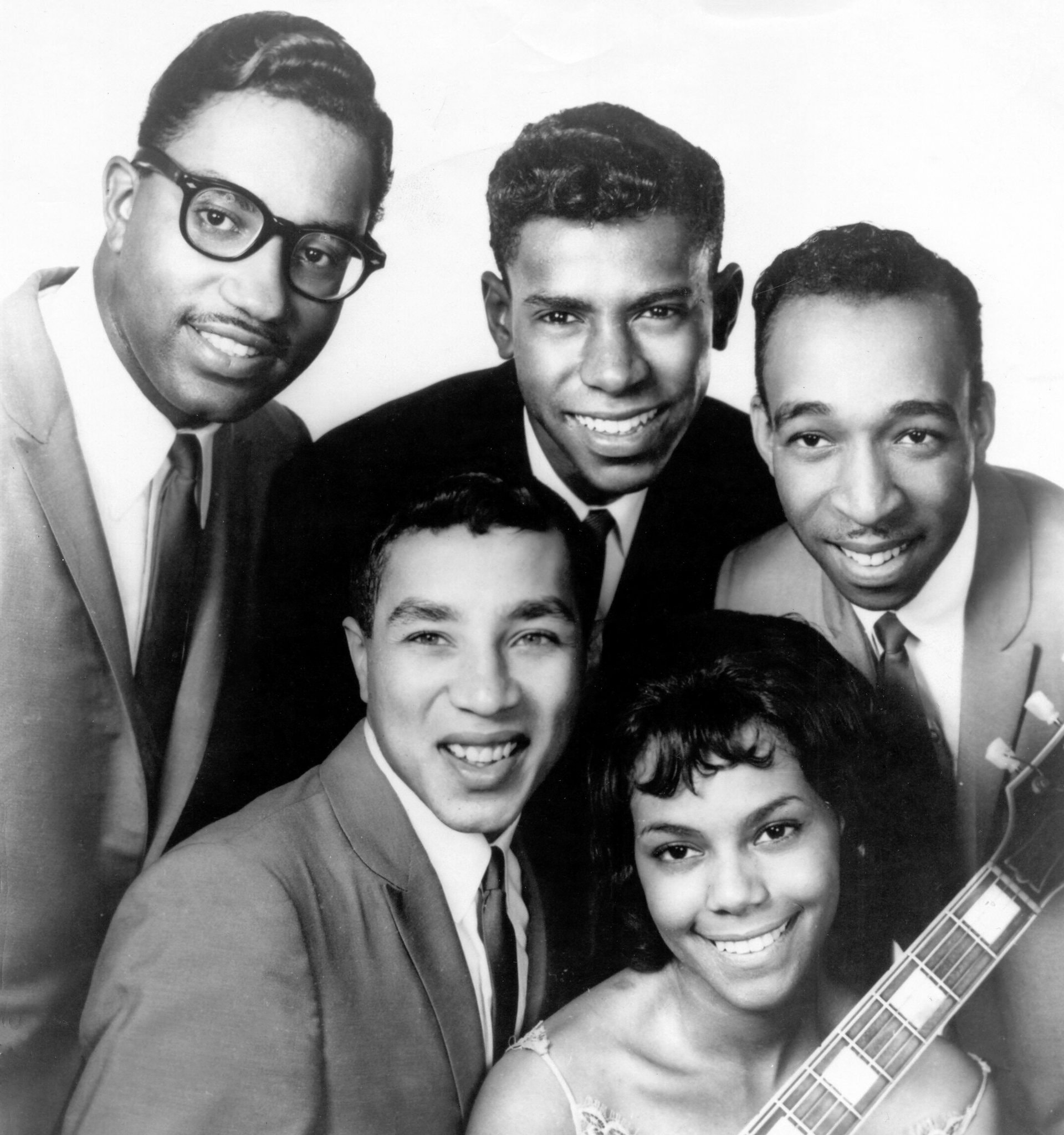
Robinson (front row, left) with the Miracles, circa 1962

In August 1957, Robinson and the Miracles met songwriter Berry Gordy after a failed audition for Brunswick Records. At that time during the audition, Robinson had brought along with him a "Big 10" notebook with 100 songs he had written while in high school. Gordy was impressed with Robinson's vocals and even more impressed with Robinson's ambitious songwriting. With his help, the Miracles released their first single "Got a Job", an answer song to the Silhouettes' hit single "Get a Job" on End Records. It was the beginning of a long and successful collaboration. During this time, Robinson attended college and started classes in January 1959, studying electrical engineering. He dropped out after only two months, following the Miracles' release of their first record.

Gordy formed Tamla Records, which was later reincorporated as Motown. The Miracles became one of the first acts signed to the label, although they had actually been with Gordy since before the formation of Motown Records. In late 1960, the group recorded their first hit single "Shop Around", which became Motown's first million-selling hit record. Between 1960 and 1970, Robinson would produce 26 Top 40 hits with the Miracles as lead singer, chief songwriter and producer, including several top ten hits such as "You've Really Got a Hold on Me", "Mickey's Monkey", "I Second That Emotion", "Baby Baby Don't Cry" and the group's only number-one hit during their Robinson years, "The Tears of a Clown".

Other notable hits such as "Ooo Baby Baby", "Going to a Go-Go", the multi-award-winning "The Tracks of My Tears", "(Come Round Here) I'm The One You Need", "The Love I Saw in You Was Just a Mirage" and "More Love" peaked in the Top 20. In 1965, the Miracles were the first Motown group to change their name when they released their 1965 album Going to a Go-Go as Smokey Robinson & the Miracles.

Between 1962 and 1966, Robinson was also one of the major songwriters and producers for Motown, penning many hit singles such as "Two Lovers", "The One Who Really Loves You", "You Beat Me to the Punch" and "My Guy" for Mary Wells; "The Way You Do The Things You Do", "My Girl", "Since I Lost My Baby", "It's Growing", and "Get Ready" for the Temptations; "Still Water (Love)" for the Four Tops; "When I'm Gone" and "Operator" for Brenda Holloway; "Don't Mess With Bill", "The Hunter Gets Captured by the Game" and "My Baby Must Be a Magician" for the Marvelettes; and "I'll Be Doggone" and "Ain't That Peculiar" for Marvin Gaye.

After the arrival of Holland–Dozier–Holland and the team of Norman Whitfield and Barrett Strong, Robinson was eclipsed as a top writer and producer for the label, and other Motown artists such as Gaye and Stevie Wonder began to compose more original material. Later in his career, Robinson wrote lyrics and music for the Contours such as "First I Look at the Purse", as well as the Four Tops' "Still Water" and The Supremes' "Floy Joy". The other Miracles—Bobby Rogers, Pete Moore, Ronnie White, and Marv Tarplin—collaborated with him as writers on many of these hits, and Pete Moore also doubled as co-producer with Robinson on several of them.

By 1969, Robinson wanted to retire from touring to focus on raising his two children with his wife Claudette, and on his duties as Motown's vice president, a job he had taken on by the mid-1960s after Esther Gordy Edwards had left the position. However, the success of the group's "Tears of a Clown" made Robinson stay with the group until 1972. His last performance with the group was in July 1972 in Washington, D.C..

=== 1970–1979: Solo career ===
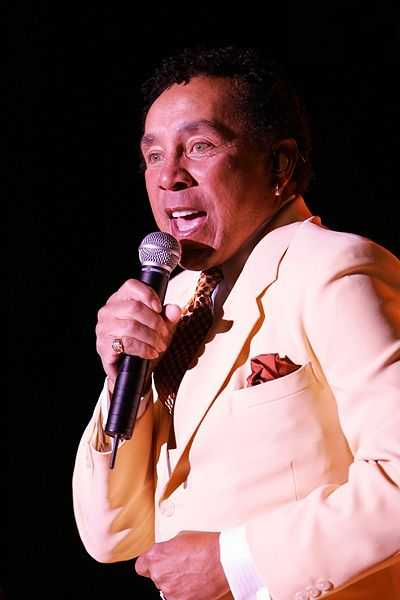
Robinson in concert at the Chumash Casino Resort in Santa Ynez, California, 2006

After a year of retirement, Robinson announced his comeback with the release of the Smokey album, in 1973. The album included the Miracles tribute song "Sweet Harmony" and the hit ballad "Baby Come Close". In 1974, Robinson's second album Pure Smokey was released but failed to produce hits. Robinson struggled to compete with his former collaborators Marvin Gaye, Stevie Wonder and former Temptations member Eddie Kendricks, as all three had multiple hit singles during this period.

Former Beatle George Harrison featured the track "Pure Smokey" on his 1976 album Thirty Three & 1/3 as a tribute to Robinson. Harrison's fellow Beatles John Lennon and Paul McCartney were also fans of Robinson's songwriting and the group covered "You Really Gotta Hold on Me" on their second UK album With the Beatles and US album The Beatles' Second Album, respectively.

Robinson answered his critics the following year with A Quiet Storm, released in 1975. The album launched three singles – the number-one R&B hit "Baby That's Backatcha", "The Agony & The Ecstasy" and "Quiet Storm" (the radio format quiet storm, originated by DJ Melvin Lindsey, is named after the album). However, Robinson's solo career suffered from his work as Motown's vice president, and his own music took the backseat. As a result, several albums including Smokey's Family Robinson, Deep in My Soul, Love Breeze and Smokin, saw poor promotion and received bad reviews. At this point Robinson relied on other writers and producers to help him with his albums.

Following these albums, Robinson got out of a writer's block after his close collaborator (and fellow Miracle) Marv Tarplin, who joined him on the road in 1973 after Robinson left the Miracles, presented him a tune he had composed on his guitar. Robinson later wrote the lyrics that became his first solo Top 10 Pop single, "Cruisin'". The song hit No. 1 in Cash Box and peaked at No. 4 on the Billboard Hot 100. It also became his first solo No. 1 in New Zealand. Robinson would follow a similar approach with his next album Warm Thoughts, which produced another Top 40 hit, "Let Me Be the Clock", though it did not repeat the success of "Cruisin'".

=== 1980–1999 ===
In 1981, Robinson topped the charts again with another sensual ballad, "Being with You", which was another No. 1 hit in Cash Box and peaked at No. 2 on the Billboard Hot 100. It also hit No. 1 on the UK Singles Chart, becoming his most successful single to date. The Gold-plus parent album sparked a partnership with George Tobin and with Tobin, Robinson released his next several Motown albums, Yes It's You Lady, which produced the hit "Tell Me Tomorrow", Touch the Sky and Essar. In 1983, Robinson teamed up with fellow Motown label mate Rick James recording the R&B ballad, "Ebony Eyes".

In 1987, following a period of personal and professional issues, Robinson made a comeback with the album One Heartbeat and the singles "Just to See Her" and "One Heartbeat", which were Top 10 hits on Billboard's Pop, Soul, and Adult Contemporary charts. They were aided by popular music videos. "Just to See Her" won Robinson his first Grammy Award in 1988. The album became one of his most successful ever, selling more than 900,000 copies in the United States alone. In the same year, Robinson released One Heartbeat, the UK group ABC released a tribute song, "When Smokey Sings".

He was inducted as a solo artist to the Rock and Roll Hall of Fame in 1988, later igniting controversy as the committee had inducted only Robinson and not members of his group, the Miracles, which Robinson saw as an affront. In 2012, however, the committee rectified the mistake announcing that the group would be inducted on their own merit. Though Robinson was not listed as an inductee, he was due to induct his former group at the ceremony in April 2012. Robinson performed a rewritten version of the song "You've Really Got a Hold on Me" on Sesame Street in 1989 called “U Really Got a Hold on Me”, alongside a grabby feminine-looking Muppet letter "U", that keeps squeezing and grabbing him.

After MCA purchased Motown in 1988, Robinson relinquished his position as vice president. Following the release of the album Love, Smokey in 1990, Robinson left Motown for a deal with SBK Records in 1991. However, the album Double Good Everything failed to chart. Robinson remained virtually quiet during the nineties (though he would make a notable cameo appearance in The Temptations 1998 miniseries), making a brief comeback in 1999 when he re-signed with Motown and issued the album Intimate, which included the song "Easy to Love".

=== 2000–present ===
In 2003, he once again split ties with Motown, releasing the gospel album Food for the Spirit on Liquid 8 Records in 2004. The music video for one of the album's singles, "Gang Bangin'", went viral in 2020. In 2004, Robinson sang the main title theme song "Colorful World" for the American children's animated series ToddWorld for Discovery Kids, TLC and Mike Young Productions. Robinson released the standards album Timeless Love in 2006 on Universal Records.

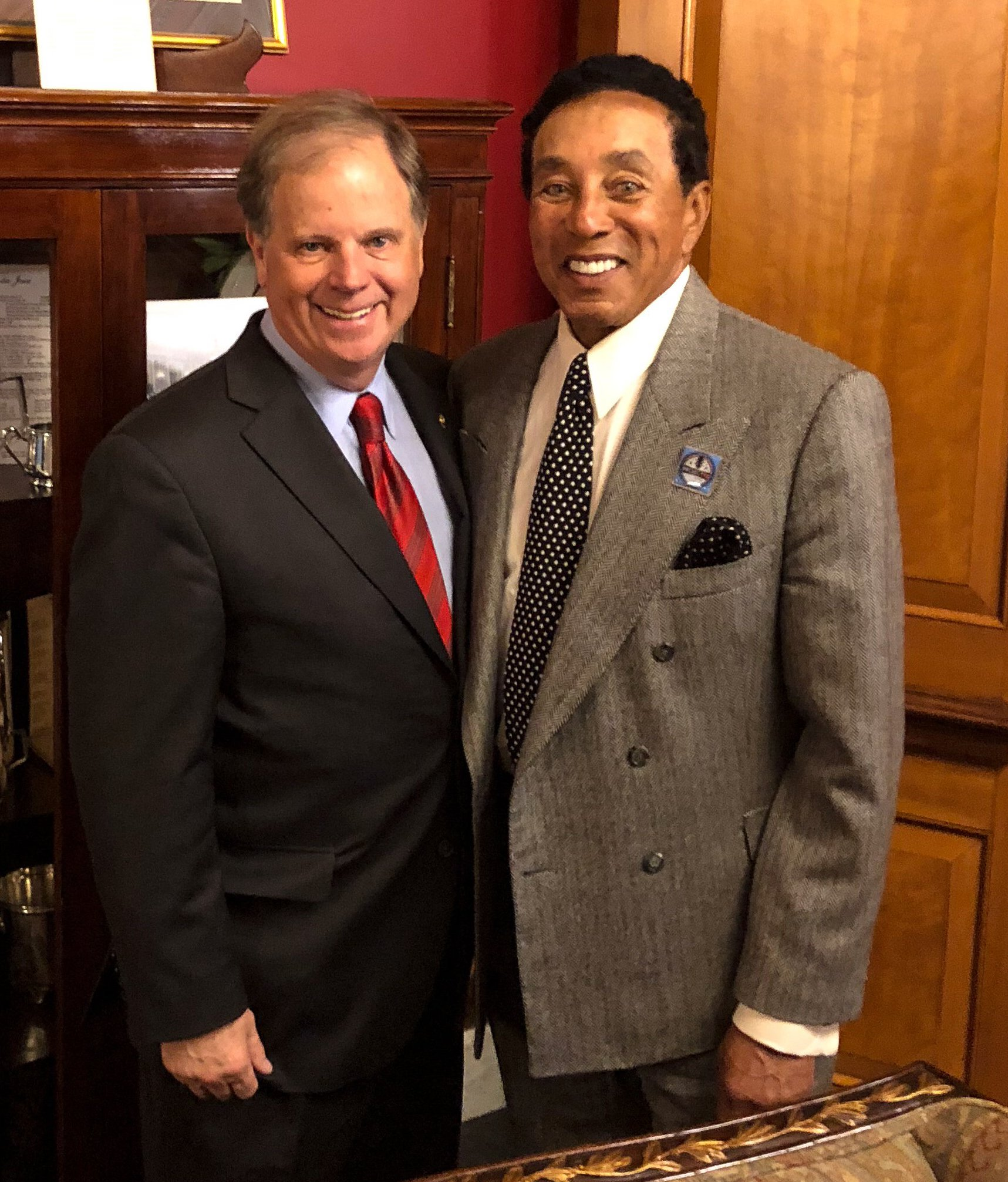
Robinson with Senator Doug Jones while testifying at the United States Congress to support the CLASSICS Act in 2018

In 2009, he issued the album Time Flies When You're Having Fun on his own label, Robso Records. It reached No. 59 on the Billboard album chart, his highest showing since One Heartbeat. He subsequently released "Now And Then" in 2010, which peaked at No. 131. Smokey & Friends was released in mid-August 2014. It was an album of duets, including songs with Elton John, Linda Ronstadt, and James Taylor. It reached No. 12 on the Billboard album chart. Christmas Everyday was Robinson's first post-Miracles Christmas album, and it was released on November 10, 2017. In 2018, he appeared on an episode of CMT Crossroads alongside country singer Cam. In April 2017, Robinson visited Fremont-Lopez Elementary School in Stockton, California, where he served as a designated arts mentor under Turnaround Arts.

On July 31, 2018, Robinson appeared on the Fox network's show Beat Shazam as a special guest. Robinson appeared on the song "Make It Better" from Anderson Paak's 2019 album Ventura. In 2023, Robinson announced that he would release his first album in almost a decade in April 2023. The nine-track album was called Gasms, and featured entirely new music. The first single from the album, called "If We Don't Have Each Other", was already available on streaming services by January 2023. Robinson released his twenty-fifth studio album, What the World Needs Now, in April 2025. The album is composed of inspirational cover songs.

== Personal life ==
=== Marriages and family ===
Robinson married a fellow Miracles member, Claudette Rogers, in 1959. The couple had two children: a son, Berry Robinson (born 1968), named after Motown's founder Berry Gordy, and a daughter, Tamla Robinson (born 1971), named after the original "Tamla" label set up by Gordy that would eventually become Motown.

According to Robinson, he had affairs with women while married to Claudette, among them an approximately year-long affair with Diana Ross. According to Robinson, Ross ended it because she felt uncomfortable as she was friends with Claudette, whom Robinson admitted he still loved. (A representative for Ross had no comment on Robinson's claim.) Robinson says that Polyamory (loving more than one person) in that way simultaneously is natural.

Robinson also had a son named Trey (born 1984) with another woman during his marriage to Claudette. After Robinson admitted to having fathered a child with a woman other than his wife, he filed for legal separation and later filed for divorce that was finalized in 1986. The Robinsons had also separated in 1974 and during that separation, Robinson engaged in an extramarital affair that inspired the song "The Agony & The Ecstasy" (later featured on A Quiet Storm).

Robinson married Frances Gladney in May 2002. They own a home in Pittsburgh and use it as a winery.

=== Interests and ventures ===
Robinson has not eaten red meat since 1972. He practices Transcendental Meditation. Robinson has golden green eyes, which he believes were passed down from his French great-grandmother.

Beginning in November 2023, Robinson is the current owner and host of the SiriusXM channel Soul Town, a station that plays R&B and soul hits from the 1950s to the early 1980s. Released under the banner Smokey's Soul Town, Robinson occasionally appears on the channel, recalling his best moments with Motown and meeting other artists as well as pick his favorite songs during that time period.

=== Legal issues ===
On May 6, 2025, it was reported that Robinson and his wife were being sued by four former female housekeepers who were alleging sexual battery, assault and false imprisonment from 2012 to 2024 seeking damages of $50 million. The women also claimed that Robinson's wife Frances created a hostile work environment by using "ethnically pejorative words and language." Robinson has denied the allegations and filed a counter-complaint accusing them of slander, intentional infliction of emotional distress and financial elder abuse. The plaintiffs filed a police report after filing the $50 million lawsuit. Robinson had previously been the subject of another accusation which was dismissed. In November 2025, two additional employees, a man who worked as a car valet and a woman who worked as a housekeeper for Robinson, joined the May 2025 lawsuit.

== Awards and nominations ==
Organizations	Year	Category	Work	Result	Ref.
American Music Awards	1976	Best Male R&B Artist	Himself	Nominated	
American Music Awards	1982	Best R&B Song	"Being With You"	Nominated	
American Music Awards	1982	Best Male R&B Artist	Himself	Nominated	
American Music Awards	1988	Best Male R&B Artist	Himself	Nominated	
Grammy Awards	1968	Best Rhythm & Blues Group Performance	"I Second That Emotion"	Nominated	
Grammy Awards	1980	Best Male R&B Vocal Performance	"Cruisin'"	Nominated	
Grammy Awards	1988	Best Male R&B Vocal Performance	"Just to See Her"	Won	
Grammy Awards	1990	Best Male R&B Vocal Performance	"We've Saved the Best for Last"	Nominated	
Grammy Awards	1991	Grammy Legend Award	Himself	Honored	
Grammy Awards	1999	Grammy Lifetime Achievement Award	Himself	Honored	
Grammy Awards	2000	Best Traditional R&B Performance	Intimate	Nominated	
Grammy Awards	2007	Best Traditional Pop Vocal Album	Timeless Love	Nominated	
NAACP Image Award	2015	Outstanding Duo, Group or Collaboration	Being With You (shared with Mary J. Blige)	Nominated	

== Honorary awards ==
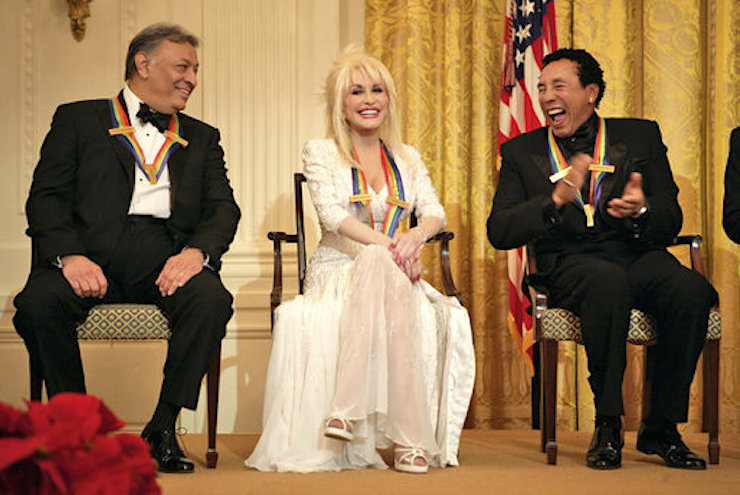
Conductor Zubin Mehta with singers Dolly Parton and Robinson during a reception for the Kennedy Center honorees in the East Room of the White House, December 3, 2006

On February 22, 1983, Robinson was awarded an individual star on The Hollywood Walk of Fame. Four years later, in 1987, he was inducted to the Rock & Roll Hall of Fame. Robinson's single "Just to See Her" from the One Heartbeat album was awarded the 1988 Grammy Award for Grammy Award for Best Male R&B Vocal Performance. This was his first Grammy. Two years later, in 1990, he was inducted to the Songwriters Hall of Fame. In 1993, he was awarded a medal at the National Medal of Arts. Two years before, he won the Heritage Award at the Soul Train Music Awards. In 2005, he was voted into the Michigan Rock and Roll Legends Hall of Fame. At its 138th Commencement Convocation in May 2006, Howard University conferred on Robinson the degree of Doctor of Music, honoris causa. In December 2006 Robinson was one of five Kennedy Center honorees, along with Dolly Parton, Zubin Mehta, Steven Spielberg and Andrew Lloyd Webber.

On March 20, 2009, the Miracles were finally honored as a group with a star on the Hollywood Walk of Fame. Robinson was present with original Miracles members Bobby Rogers, Pete Moore, (Bobby's cousin) Claudette Rogers, and Gloria White, accepting for her husband, the late Ronnie White, whose daughter Pamela and granddaughter Maya were there representing him as well. Robinson's replacement, 1970s Miracles lead singer Billy Griffin, was also honored. Controversially, original Miracle Marv Tarplin was not honored, against the wishes of his fellow Miracles and the group's fans, who felt that he should have also been there to share the honor. Later, Tarplin did receive his star.

He was also inducted with the rest of the original Miracles, Bobby Rogers, Pete Moore, Ronnie White, and Claudette Robinson, into the Rock and Roll Hall of Fame in 2012, 25 years after Robinson's controversial solo induction in 1987. In 2009, Robinson received an honorary doctorate degree—along with Linda Ronstadt—and gave a commencement speech at Berklee College of Music's commencement ceremony.He was also awarded Society of Singers Lifetime Achievement Award in 2011. In 2015, he was given a BET Lifetime Achievement Award. In 2016, Robinson received the Library of Congress' Gershwin Prize for Popular Song; and, on August 21, 2016, he was inducted into the National Rhythm & Blues Hall of Fame in his hometown of Detroit. In 2019, he received the Golden Plate Award of the American Academy of Achievement presented by Awards Council members Jimmy Page and Peter Gabriel. In 2023, Rolling Stone ranked Robinson at No. 23 on their list of the 200 Greatest Singers of All Time.

Organizations	Year	Category	Result	Ref.
Hollywood Walk of Fame	1983	Recording Star	Honored	
Rock & Roll Hall of Fame	1987	Inductee	Honored	
Songwriters Hall of Fame	1990	Inductee	Honored	
Soul Train Music Awards	1990	Heritage Award	Honored	
National Endowment for the Arts	1993	National Medal of Arts	Honored	
Michigan Rock and Roll Legends Hall of Fame	2005	Inductee	Honored	
Howard University	2006	Doctorate of Music honoris causa	Honored	
John F. Kennedy Center for the Performing Arts	2006	Kennedy Center Honors	Honored	(Note: honored along with Dolly Parton, Zubin Mehta, Steven Spielberg and Andrew Lloyd Webber.)
Berklee College of Music	2009	Honorary doctorate	Honored	
Society of Singers	2011	Lifetime Achievement Award	Honored	
BET Awards	2016	Lifetime Achievement Award	Honored	
Library of Congress	2016	Gershwin Prize	Honored	
National Rhythm & Blues Hall of Fame	2016	Inductee	Honored	
American Academy of Achievement	2019	Golden Plate Award	Honored	
Rolling Stone Magazine	2023	No. 23 on their list of the 200 Greatest Singers of All Time	Honored	

== Discography ==
The Miracles

- Hi... We're the Miracles (1961)
- Cookin' with the Miracles (1961)
- I'll Try Something New (1962)
- The Fabulous Miracles (1963)
- The Miracles Doin' Mickey's Monkey (1963)
- I Like It Like That (1964)

Smokey Robinson & the Miracles

- Going to a Go-Go (1965)
- Away We a Go-Go (1966)
- Make It Happen (1967)
- Special Occasion (1968)
- Time Out for Smokey Robinson & The Miracles (1969)
- Four in Blue (1969)
- What Love Has...Joined Together (1970)
- A Pocket Full of Miracles (1970)
- The Season for Miracles (1970)
- One Dozen Roses (1971)
- Flying High Together (1972)

Studio albums

- Smokey (1973)
- Pure Smokey (1974)
- A Quiet Storm (1975)
- Smokey's Family Robinson (1976)
- Deep in My Soul (1977)
- Love Breeze (1978)
- Where There's Smoke... (1979)
- Warm Thoughts (1980)
- Being with You (1981)
- Yes It's You Lady (1982)
- Touch the Sky (1983)
- Essar (1984)
- Smoke Signals (1986)
- One Heartbeat (1987)
- Love, Smokey (1990)
- Double Good Everything (1991)
- Intimate (1999)
- Food for the Spirit (2004)
- Timeless Love (2006)
- Time Flies When You're Having Fun (2009)
- Now and Then (2010)
- Smokey & Friends (2014)
- Gasms (2023)
- What the World Needs Now (2025)

== See also ==
- List of American Grammy Award winners and nominees
