= Being with You (song) =

1981 Single by Smokey Robinson

Single by Smokey Robinson

from the album Being with You
- B-side: "What's in Your Life for Me"
- Released: January 23, 1981
- Recorded: January 1981
- Studio: Studio Sound Recorders (North Hollywood, California, United States)
- Genre: Quiet storm; R&B
- Length: 4:06
- Label: Motown
- Songwriter: Smokey Robinson
- Producers: George Tobin, Mike Piccirillo

Smokey Robinson singles chronology
"Let Me Be the Clock" (1980)	"Being with You" (1981)	"You Are Forever" (1981)

Music video
- "Being With You" on YouTube

"Being with You" is a 1981 song recorded by American singer Smokey Robinson. The song spent five weeks at No. 1 on the Hot Soul Singles chart from March to early May 1981 and reached number two on the Billboard Hot 100, behind "Bette Davis Eyes" by Kim Carnes, his highest charting solo hit on the Billboard pop charts. It also reached number one in the UK Singles Chart.

== Background ==
Robinson approached George Tobin, who had produced Kim Carnes’ cover of the Robinson-written “More Love”, and offered the song to Carnes. However, Tobin was no longer working with Carnes at that point and after hearing the demo suggested Robinson record it himself. Tobin also agreed to produce the track.

"Being with You" is the title track from Robinson's Gold-certified album with the same name. The song reached No. 1 on the US Cash Box Top 100. The track was also a No. 1 hit in the UK Singles Chart in June 1981, becoming Robinson's second UK No. 1 single and his first as a solo artist.

Soon after Robinson's English single was released, Motown's subsidiary label Tamla released a Spanish version of the song under the title of "Aqui Con Tigo" (Tamla T 54325F), backed with a bilingual English/Spanish version.

== Charts ==
=== Weekly charts ===
Weekly chart performance for "Being with You"
Chart (1981)	Peak position
Australia (Kent Music Report)	14
Belgium (Ultratop 50 Flanders)	37
Canada RPM Top Singles	5
Canada Adult Contemporary	5
France	2
Ireland (IRMA)	2
New Zealand Singles Chart	1
South Africa	7
UK Singles Chart	1
US Billboard Hot 100	2
US Adult Contemporary (Billboard)	4
US Hot R&B/Hip-Hop Songs (Billboard)	1
US Cash Box Top 100	1

=== Year-end charts ===
Year-end chart performance for "Being with You"
Chart (1981)	Rank
Australia (Kent Music Report)	95
Canada	16
New Zealand	7
UK	12
US Billboard Hot 100	13
US Cash Box Top 100	19

== Certifications ==
Certifications for "Being with You"
Region	Certification	Certified units/sales
Canada (Music Canada)	Gold	50,000^{^}
United Kingdom (BPI)	Gold	500,000^{^}
United States (RIAA)	Gold	1,000,000^{^}
^{^} Shipments figures based on certification alone.
