= The Miracles discography =

- Studio albums: 25
- Live albums: 3
- Compilation albums: 7
- Singles: 57

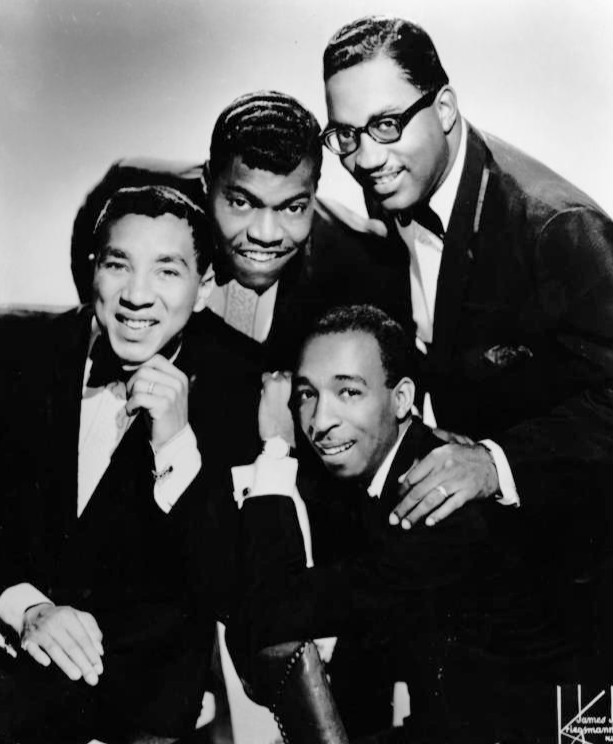
Trade ad for Smokey Robinson & the Miracles's single "Going To A Go-Go".

The Miracles were the Motown Record Corporation's first group and its first million-selling recording artists. During their 19-year run on the American music charts, the Miracles charted over 50 hits and recorded in the genres of doo-wop, soul, disco, and R&B. Twenty-six Miracles songs reached the top 10 of the Billboard R&B singles chart, including four R&B number ones. Sixteen charted within the top 20 of the Billboard Hot 100, with seven reaching the top ten and two – 1970's "The Tears of a Clown" and 1975's "Love Machine" (Part 1) – reaching No. 1. A third song, the million-selling "Shop Around", reached No. 1 on the Cash Box magazine pop chart. The Miracles also scored 11 U.S. R&B top 10 albums, including two number ones.

According to several websites, the Miracles are one of the most covered groups in recorded history and the most covered Motown group ever. Their music and songs have influenced artists all over the world – in every major musical genre – over the last 60 years. At #32, the Miracles are the highest-ranking Motown group on Rolling Stone magazine's list of "The 100 Greatest Artists of All Time". They also have the distinction of having more songs inducted into the Grammy Hall of Fame than any other Motown group. All releases were on Motown Records' Tamla subsidiary label unless otherwise indicated.

In the 1960s, Motown Record Corporation, like many independent labels, did not register sales figures through the RIAA, the organization that certifies and awards gold records; it is therefore difficult to determine the full number of Miracles songs and recordings that sold a million or more records. Also, with the passing of decades of time, some songs that did not sell a million records initially may have indeed done so over the years. However, several reference works, such as the books Hits of the '60s: The Million Sellers by Demitri Coryton and Joseph Murrells, as well as The Book of Golden Discs by Joseph Murrells, point out that the Miracles had several million-selling records during their career, including "Shop Around" (1961), "You've Really Got a Hold on Me" (1962), "Mickey's Monkey" (1963), "The Tracks of My Tears" (1965), "Going to a Go-Go", (single and album) (1965), "I Second That Emotion" (1967), "Baby Baby Don't Cry" (1969), "The Tears of a Clown" (1970), "Do It Baby" (1974), "Love Machine" (1975), and the platinum album City of Angels (1975). This is quite probably an incomplete list, since Miracle Pete Moore stated on his corporate website, that the Miracles actually had 12 million-selling records to their credit by 1967, including 1965's "Ooo Baby Baby".

== Albums ==
=== The Miracles ===
Tamla (Motown) releases
Year	Album	Peak chart positions	
Year	Album	US	US R&B
1961	Hi... We're the Miracles	—	—
1961	Cookin' with the Miracles	—	—
1962	I'll Try Something New	—	—
1963	The Fabulous Miracles	118	—
1963	The Miracles Recorded Live on Stage	139	—
1963	Christmas with The Miracles	—	—
1963	The Miracles Doin' Mickey's Monkey	113	—
1964	I Like It Like That	—	—
"—" denotes releases that did not chart

=== Smokey Robinson & the Miracles ===
Tamla (Motown) releases
Year	Album	Peak chart positions	
Year	Album	US	US R&B
1965	Going to a Go-Go	8	1
1966	Away We a Go-Go	41	3
1967	Make It Happen (re-issued as The Tears of a Clown in 1970)	28	3
1968	Special Occasion	42	1
1969	Smokey Robinson & the Miracles LIVE!	71	7
1969	Time Out for Smokey Robinson & The Miracles	25	—
1969	Four in Blue	78	3
1970	What Love Has...Joined Together	97	9
1970	A Pocket Full of Miracles	56	10
1970	The Season for Miracles (Christmas album)	—	—
1971	One Dozen Roses	92	17
1972	Flying High Together (last studio album with Smokey Robinson)	46	31
1972	Smokey Robinson & The Miracles: 1957–1972 (live; final concert/double album)	75	14
"—" denotes releases that did not chart

=== The Miracles (with Billy Griffin) ===
Tamla (Motown) releases
Year	Album	Peak chart positions		
Year	Album	US	US R&B	AUS
1973	Renaissance	174	33	—
1974	Do It Baby	41	4	—
1975	Don't Cha Love It	96	7	—
1975	City of Angels	33	29	81
1976	The Power of Music	178	35	—
"—" denotes releases that did not chart

Columbia releases
Year	Album	Peak chart positions	
Year	Album	US	US R&B
1977	Love Crazy	117	31
1978	The Miracles	—	—
"—" denotes releases that did not chart

=== Compilations ===
Motown releases
Year	Album	Peaks
Year	Album	US
1965	Greatest Hits from the Beginning (double-album)	21
1968	Greatest Hits, Vol. 2	7
1974	Anthology (re-released in 1986, 1995 and 2002 with different track-listings)	97
1977	Greatest Hits (with Billy Griffin)	—
1994	The 35th Anniversary Collection	—
1998	The Ultimate Collection	—
1999	Lost and Found: Along Came Love (1958–1964)	—
2002	Ooo Baby Baby: The Anthology	—
2009	Depend on Me: The Early Albums	—
"—" denotes releases that did not chart

== Singles ==
=== The Miracles ===
==== First (pre-Motown) releases ====
Year	Titles (A-side, B-side)	Peak chart positions	Album
Year	Titles (A-side, B-side)	US R&B	Album
1958	"Got a Job" b/w "My Mama Done Told Me"	5	Greatest Hits from the Beginning
1958	"Money" b/w "I Cry"	—	Greatest Hits from the Beginning
1959	"I Need a Change" b/w "All I Want Is You"	—	Greatest Hits from the Beginning
"—" denotes releases that did not chart

==== Tamla (Motown) releases ====
Year	Titles (A-side, B-side) Both sides from same album except where indicated	Peak chart positions				Certifications	Album
Year	Titles (A-side, B-side) Both sides from same album except where indicated	US	US R&B	CAN	UK	Certifications	Album
1959	"It" b/w "Don't Say Bye Bye"	—	—	—	—		Non-album tracks
1959	"Bad Girl" b/w "I Love Your Baby"	93	—	—	—		Greatest Hits from the Beginning
1959	"The Feeling Is So Fine" b/w "(You Can) Depend on Me" (from Hi, We're the Miracles)	—	—	—	—		Non-album track
1960	"Way Over There" b/w "(You Can) Depend on Me" (second version)	94	—	—	—		Hi, We're the Miracles
1960	"Shop Around" b/w "Who's Lovin' You"	2	1	—	—		Hi, We're the Miracles
1961	"Ain't It Baby" b/w "The Only One I Love"	49	15	—	—		Cookin' with the Miracles
1961	"Mighty Good Lovin'" /	51	21	—	—		Non-album track
1961	"Broken Hearted"	97	—	—	—		Cookin' with the Miracles
1961	"Everybody's Gotta Pay Some Dues" b/w "I Can't Believe"	52	11	—	—		Cookin' with the Miracles
1961	"What's So Good About Goodbye" /	35	16	—	—		I'll Try Something New
1961	"I've Been Good to You"	— (Note: Peaked at number 3 on the Billboard Bubbling Under Hot 100 chart.)	—	—	—		I'll Try Something New
1962	"I'll Try Something New" b/w "You Never Miss a Good Thing" (from Cookin' with the Miracles)	39	11	—	—		I'll Try Something New
1962	"You've Really Got a Hold on Me" b/w "Happy Landing"	8	1	—	—		The Fabulous Miracles
1963	"A Love She Can Count On" /	31	21	—	—		The Fabulous Miracles
1963	"I Can Take a Hint"	— (Note: Peaked at number 7 on the Billboard Bubbling Under Hot 100 chart.)	—	—	—		The Fabulous Miracles
1963	"Mickey's Monkey" b/w "Whatever Makes You Happy" (from The Fabulous Miracles)	8	3	—	—		Doin' Mickey's Monkey
1963	"I Gotta Dance to Keep from Crying" b/w "Such Is Love, Such Is Life" (from The Fabulous Miracles)	35	17	—	—		Doin' Mickey's Monkey
1963	"The Christmas Song" (Note: Released only as a promo single.) b/w "Christmas Everyday"	—	—	—	—		Christmas with the Miracles
1964	"(You Can't Let the Boy Overpower) The Man in You" b/w "Heartbreak Road" (from The Fabulous Miracles)	59	12	—	—		Non-album track
1964	"I Like It Like That" b/w "You're So Fine and Sweet" (Non-album track)	27	10	37	—		Greatest Hits from the Beginning
1964	"That's What Love Is Made Of" b/w "Would I Love You"	35	9	—	—		Greatest Hits from the Beginning
1964	"Come On Do the Jerk" b/w "Baby Don't You Go" (Non-album track)	50	22	—	—		Greatest Hits Vol. 2
1965	"Ooo Baby Baby" b/w "All That's Good"	16	4	17	—		Going to a Go-Go
1965	"The Tracks of My Tears" b/w "A Fork in the Road"	16	2	5	9 (Note: Chart position is from 1969.)	BPI: Silver	Going to a Go-Go
1965	"My Girl Has Gone" b/w "Since You Won My Heart"	14	3	—	—		Going to a Go-Go
1965	"Going to a Go-Go" /	11	2	—	44		Going to a Go-Go
1965	"Choosey Beggar"	—	35	—	—		Going to a Go-Go
1966	"Whole Lot of Shakin' in My Heart (Since I Met You)" b/w "Oh Be My Love"	46	20	53	—		Away We a Go-Go
1966	"(Come 'Round Here) I'm the One You Need" b/w "Save Me"	17	4	12	13 (Note: Peaked at number 37 in the UK on original issue in 1966. 1971 reissue peaked at number 13.)		Away We a Go-Go
"—" denotes releases that did not chart

=== Smokey Robinson & The Miracles ===
(Same members, name changed to spotlight lead singer)

Tamla (Motown) releases
Year	Titles (A-side, B-side) Both sides from same album except where indicated	Peak chart positions				Certifications	Album
Year	Titles (A-side, B-side) Both sides from same album except where indicated	US	US R&B	CAN	UK	Certifications	Album
1967	"The Love I Saw in You Was Just a Mirage" b/w "Come Spy with Me" (Non-album track)	20	10	36	—		Make It Happen
1967	"More Love" b/w "Swept for You Baby" (from Away We a Go-Go)	23	5	8	—		Make It Happen
1967	"I Second That Emotion" b/w "You Must Be Love" (from Make It Happen)	4	1	13	27		Greatest Hits Vol. 2
1968	"If You Can Want" b/w "When the Words from You Heart; Get Caught Up in Your Throat" (Non-album track)	11	3	17	50		Special Occasion
1968	"Yester Love" b/w "Much Better Off"	31	9	28	—		Special Occasion
1968	"Special Occasion" b/w "Give Her Up"	26	4	29	—		Special Occasion
1969	"Baby, Baby Don't Cry" b/w "Your Mother's Only Daughter" (from Special Occasion)	8	3	8	—		Time Out for Smokey Robinson & The Miracles
1969	"Here I Go Again" /	37	15	53	—		Time Out for Smokey Robinson & The Miracles
1969	"Doggone Right"	32	7	40	—		Time Out for Smokey Robinson & The Miracles
1969	"Abraham, Martin and John" b/w "Much Better Off" (from Special Occasion)	33	16	56	—		Time Out for Smokey Robinson & The Miracles
1969	"Point It Out" /	37	4	38	—		A Pocket Full of Miracles
1969	"Darling Dear"	100	—	—	—		A Pocket Full of Miracles
1970	"Who's Gonna Take the Blame" b/w "I Gotta Thing for You" (Non-album track)	46	9	79	—		A Pocket Full of Miracles
1970	"The Tears of a Clown" b/w "Promise Me" (Non-album track)	1	1	7	1	BPI: Silver	One Dozen Roses
1971	"I Don't Blame You at All" b/w "That Girl"	18	7	—	11		One Dozen Roses
1971	"Crazy About the La La La" b/w "Oh Baby Baby I Love You"	56	20	67	—		One Dozen Roses
1971	"Satisfaction" b/w "Flower Girl" (from A Pocket Full of Miracles)	49	20	74	—		One Dozen Roses
1972	"We've Come Too Far to End It Now" b/w "When Sundown Comes" (from One Dozen Roses)	46	9	—	—		Flying High Together
1972	"I Can't Stand to See You Cry" b/w "With Your Love Came"	45	21	—	—		Flying High Together
1976	"The Tears of a Clown" b/w "The Tracks of My Tears"	—	—	—	34 (Note: Re-released in the UK in 1976.)		Anthology
"—" denotes releases that did not chart

=== The Miracles (with Billy Griffin) ===
Tamla (Motown) releases
Year	Titles (A-side, B-side) Both sides from same album except where indicated	Peak chart positions					Certifications	Album
Year	Titles (A-side, B-side) Both sides from same album except where indicated	US	US R&B	CAN	AUS	UK	Certifications	Album
1973	"What Is A Heart Good For" b/w "Wigs and Lashes"	—	—	—	—	—		Renaissance
1973	"Don't Let It End ('Til You Let It Begin)" b/w "Wigs and Lashes"	56	26	—	—	—		Renaissance
1973	"Give Me Just Another Day" b/w "I Wanna Be with You" (from Renaissance)	— (Note: Peaked at number 11 on the Billboard Bubbling Under Hot 100 chart.)	47	—	—	—		Do It Baby
1974	"Do It Baby" b/w "I Wanna Be with You" (from Renaissance)	13	4	21	96	—		Do It Baby
1974	"Don't Cha Love It" b/w "Up Again" (from Do It Baby)	78	4	45	—	—		Don't Cha Love It
1975	"Gemini" b/w "You Are Love" (from Do It Baby)	— (Note: Peaked at number 1 on the Billboard Bubbling Under Hot 100 chart.)	43	—	—	—		Don't Cha Love It
1975	"Love Machine" – Part 1 b/w Part 2	1	5	11	89	3	BPI: Silver	City of Angels
1976	"Night Life" b/w "Smog"	—	60	—	—	52		City of Angels
"—" denotes releases that did not chart

Columbia releases (as "The Miracles featuring Billy Griffin")
Year	Titles (A-side, B-side)	Peak chart positions			Year
Year	Titles (A-side, B-side)	US	US R&B	UK	Year
1977	"Spy for Brotherhood" b/w "The Bird Must Fly Away"	— (Note: Peaked at number 4 on the Billboard Bubbling Under Hot 100.)	37	—	Love Crazy
1977	"I Can Touch the Sky" b/w "Women (Make the World Go 'Round)"	—	—	—	Love Crazy
1978	"Mean Machine" b/w "The Magic of Your Eyes (Laura's Eyes)"	—	55	—	Miracles
"—" denotes releases that did not chart

== Videography ==
=== DVD release ===
- Smokey Robinson & The Miracles: The Definitive Performances (1963–1987) (2006)
