= Anthology (The Miracles album) =

Compilation album by The Miracles
- Released: 1974
- Recorded: 1958–1972 at Hitsville U.S.A., Detroit
- Genre: R&B/soul
- Label: Motown Record Corporation
- Producers: Smokey Robinson, Berry Gordy, Johnny Bristol, Brian Holland, Lamont Dozier, Pete Moore, Ashford & Simpson, Al Cleveland, Bobby Rogers

The Miracles chronology
Renaissance (1973)	Anthology (1974)	Do It Baby (1974)

Anthology is the first compilation album by American rhythm and blues group The Miracles. It was released in 1974 by Motown Records.

== Critical reception ==
Professional ratings
Review scores
Source	Rating
Tom Hull	A− (1995 CD)

Music critic Robert Christgau included the album in his basic rock library of records before 1980, published in Christgau's Record Guide: The '80s (1990).

== Track listing ==
=== Side One ===
1. "Got a Job" (Smokey Robinson, Berry Gordy, Tyrone Carlo) – 2:40
2. "Bad Girl" (Robinson, Gordy) – 2:41
3. "Way Over There" (Robinson, Gordy) – 2:48
4. "(You Can) Depend on Me" (Robinson, Gordy) – 3:08
5. "Shop Around" (Robinson, Gordy) – 2:47
6. "Who's Lovin' You" (Robinson) – 2:52
7. "What's So Good About Goodbye" (Robinson) – 2:20

=== Side Two ===
1. "I'll Try Something New" (Robinson) – 2:33
2. "I've Been Good To You" (Robinson) – 2:35
3. "You've Really Got a Hold on Me" (Robinson) – 2:49
4. "A Love She Can Count On" (Robinson) – 2:39
5. "Mickey's Monkey" (Brian Holland, Lamont Dozier, Eddie Holland) – 2:39
6. "I Gotta Dance to Keep From Crying" (Holland, Dozier, Holland) – 2:39
7. "I Like It Like That" (Robinson, Marv Tarplin) – 2:44

=== Side Three ===
1. "That's What Love Is Made Of" (Robinson, Bobby Rogers, Pete Moore) – 2:48
2. "Come On Do The Jerk" (Robinson, Rogers, Moore, Ronnie White) – 2:47
3. "Ooo Baby Baby" (Robinson, Moore) – 2:42
4. "Tracks of My Tears" (Robinson, Moore, Tarplin) – 2:53
5. "My Girl Has Gone" (Robinson, Moore, Tarplin, White) – 2:43
6. "Choosey Beggar" (Robinson, Moore) – 2:30
7. "Going to a Go-Go" (Robinson, Moore, Rogers, Tarplin) – 2:48

=== Side Four ===
1. "(Come 'Round Here) I'm the One You Need" (Holland, Dozier, Holland) – 2:33
2. "Save Me" (Robinson, Moore, Rogers) – 2:21
3. "The Love I Saw in You Was Just a Mirage" (Robinson, Tarplin) – 2:59
4. "More Love" (Robinson) – 2:39
5. "I Second That Emotion" (Robinson, Al Cleveland) – 2:39
6. "If You Can Want" (Robinson) – 2:42
7. "Yester Love" (Robinson, Cleveland) – 2:16

=== Side Five ===
1. "Special Occasion" (Robinson, Cleveland) – 2:17
2. "Baby, Baby Don't Cry" (Robinson, Cleveland, Terry Johnson) – 3:29
3. "Doggone Right" (Robinson, Cleveland, Tarplin) – 2:56
4. "Here I Go Again" (Robinson, Johnson, Cleveland, Moore) – 2:56
5. "Abraham, Martin and John" (Dick Holler) – 2:59
6. "Darling Dear" (George Gordy, Allen Story, Rosemary Gordy) – 3:07
7. "Point It Out" (Robinson, Cleveland, Tarplin) – 2:54

=== Side Six ===
1. "Who's Gonna Take the Blame" (Nick Ashford, Valerie Simpson) – 3:34
2. "The Tears of a Clown" (Robinson, Hank Cosby, Stevie Wonder) – 2:59
3. "I Don't Blame You At All" (Robinson) – 2:57
4. "Satisfaction" (Robinson) – 3:20
5. "Crazy About the La La La" (Robinson) – 2:59
6. "We've Come Too Far to End It Now" (Wade Brown, David Jones, Johnny Bristol) – 3:25
7. "I Can't Stand to See You Cry" (Brown, Jones, Bristol) – 3:28
