= List of awards and nominations received by the Miracles =

This is a list of awards and recognition for Motown Records group The Miracles.

== 100 Greatest Artists of All Time ==
The Miracles are on three "100 Greatest Artists of All Time" lists:

- Rolling Stone's list at #32 (The Miracles are the Highest-Ranking Motown group on the Rolling Stone list)
- VH-1's list at #61 (1998 list)
- Billboard's list at #71

== Grammy Hall of Fame ==
The Miracles are four-time inductees into the Grammy Hall of Fame. As of 2026, The Miracles have more Grammy Hall of Fame inducted songs than any other Motown group.

Grammy Hall of Fame Awards-The Miracles:
Year Recorded	Title	Genre	Year Inducted
1962	"You've Really Got a Hold on Me"	Traditional R&B (Single)	1998
1965	"The Tracks Of My Tears"	Traditional R&B (Single)	2007
1967*	"The Tears of a Clown"	Pop (Single)	2002
1960	"Shop Around"	Traditional R&B (Single)	2006

- *Not released as a single until 1970.

== Rolling Stone rankings ==
- 500 Greatest Songs of All Time
  - "Ooo Baby Baby" (1965) – #262 (incorrectly credited solely to Smokey Robinson)
  - "The Tracks Of My Tears" (1965) – #50
  - "Shop Around" (1960) – #495
- The 500 Greatest Albums of All Time
  - Going to a Go-Go (1965)
- 100 Greatest Artists of All Time
- The Miracles are listed at #32 on its list of its Immortals: The 100 Greatest Artists of All Time. (The Miracles are the highest-ranking Motown group on the Rolling Stone list).

== The Rock and Roll Hall of Fame rankings ==
- 500 Songs That Shaped Rock and Roll
  - "Going to a Go-Go" (1965)
  - "The Tracks of My Tears" (1965)
  - "You've Really Got a Hold on Me" (1962)
  - "Shop Around" (1962)

== Hall of Fame inductions ==
- Vocal Group Hall of Fame
- Hollywood Walk Of Fame
- Rock and Roll Hall of Fame
- Grammy Hall of Fame (Four time inductees)
- Doo-Wop Hall of Fame (inducted 2011)
- Michigan Rock and Roll Legends Hall of Fame
- Hit Parade Hall of Fame
- Goldmine Magazine Hall of Fame
- The People's Rock and Roll Hall of Fame
- Rhythm and Blues Music Hall of Fame

== Other awards ==
- Four songs by The Miracles ("The Tracks of My Tears," "Ooo Baby Baby," "Shop Around," and "You've Really Got a Hold on Me") were selected by the National Recording Preservation Board for the United States Library of Congress' National Recording Registry, which honors and preserves culturally, historically and aesthetically significant American recordings.
- Miracles members Smokey Robinson, Bobby Rogers, Pete Moore, Ronnie White and Marv Tarplin were given awards for their songwriting success by the BMI in 1971.
- Miracles members Pete Moore, Marv Tarplin, and Smokey Robinson earned The Award Of Merit from The American Society of Composers, Authors and Publishers (ASCAP) for composing "The Tracks Of My Tears".
- Motown DVD The Miracles:The Definitive Performances awarded Certified Gold status by the RIAA.
- Two-time recipient of the Heroes and Legends Award
- Winner- Rhythm and Blues Foundation's Pioneer Award
- Spirit of Detroit Award
- National Recording Registry award for "Tracks of My Tears" included in the Library of Congress in 2008
- Detroit's Woodbridge Estates renames a boulevard and a park after the group in 2002.
- Given a certificate of recognition by the governor of the state of Michigan due to their important contributions to the state of Michigan and the city of Detroit for its music industry accomplishments.
- Resolution Award, the highest honor given by the Detroit city council for the group's achievements
- Beverly Hills City Council proclamation recognizing the group's contributions to the music industry and pop culture
- Star on the Hollywood Walk Of Fame (inducted March 20, 2009).
- "The Tracks of My Tears" has been ranked at #127 in its list of the Songs of the Century – the 365 Greatest Songs of the 20th Century by the Recording Industry Association of America and The National Endowment for the Arts.
- One of the Twenty Greatest Doo-Wop Groups of All Time by the editors of Goldmine magazine
- Inducted into the Rock and Roll Hall of Fame on April 14, 2012, although lead singer Smokey Robinson had been inducted separately and controversially in 1987. Members inducted were original members Ronald White, Bobby Rogers, Pete Moore, Claudette Robinson, and Marv Tarplin.
