= Do It Baby (album) =

Studio album by The Miracles
- Released: August 21, 1974
- Recorded: 1974
- Genre: Soul
- Length: 32:23
- Label: Tamla; TS-334
- Producer: Willie Hutch, Freddie Perren, Hal Davis, Leon Ware, Joe Porter

The Miracles chronology
Anthology (1974)	Do It Baby (1974)	Don't Cha Love It (1975)

Singles from Do It Baby
- 1. "Give Me Just Another Day" Released: November 8, 1973; 2. "Do It Baby" Released: June 20, 1974

"Do It Baby" (TS334), was a 1974 R&B album by The Miracles issued on Motown's Tamla subsidiary label. It was noted as the second album by the group featuring new lead singer Billy Griffin, after the departure of original Miracles lead singer Smokey Robinson two years earlier. This was the first-ever Miracles album which had absolutely no creative input from Robinson whatsoever. While the group's first album with Griffin, Renaissance (which was executive-produced by Robinson), was critically acclaimed but commercially unsuccessful, "Do It Baby" was much more successful, reaching No. 41 on the Billboard pop albums chart and No. 4 of the Billboard R&B albums chart.

== History ==
The album's cover is a humorous cartoon drawing by Frank Frezzo that depicts the four Miracles, Bobby Rogers, Pete Moore, Ron White, and Billy Griffin onstage, performing the "Miracle" of parting a "Red Sea" of concert-goers.

The obvious difference in the chart placings of the two albums was because, while Renaissance had no hit singles, this album had the advantage of being fronted by the Miracles' first big hit with Griffin, the million-selling title track, "Do It Baby", which proved to the world that The Miracles could indeed have big hits without Smokey Robinson, and that they had not "dropped off the map", as many music critics had predicted they would.

Though not the artistic and creative tour-de-force that Renaissance was, Do It Baby was, nevertheless, still a solid sophomore effort, again featuring several tunes from noted composers, such as Leon Ware, Freddie Perren, Willie Hutch, (all of whom also contributed to their previous Renaissance album), actor/songwriter Clifton Davis, Arthur "T-Boy" Ross (Diana's brother), Tony Hiller, and Christine Yarian. In addition to the hit title song, other singles issued were the stylishly lush, but surprisingly unsuccessful. "Give Me Just Another Day" (Tamla T 54240F), an entirely new symphonic sound for The Miracles, which confused many Disc Jockeys at the time, and failed to reach the Billboard Hot 100 (#111 Pop, 47 R&B). However, it has since found new life as a much sampled song by Hip-Hop artists such as Young Jeezy, Schoolboy Q, Marco Polo, Wade Waters, Christina Milian, Rick Ross, and others). The only other single released was the UK-only “Where Are You Going to My Love” (Tamla Motown TMG 940). originally recorded by British group Brotherhood of Man (not released as a single in the U.S.) The album also featured the group's inaugural single from Renaissance, "What Is a Heart Good For" (Tamla 54240), the intended first Miracles single with Billy Griffin, which was withdrawn from single release for unknown reasons. The album also includes Willie Hutch's "I Can't Get Ready for Losing You," a powerful guitar-driven smoker (originally recorded by The Jackson Five) that speeds along like a runaway locomotive, showcasing Griffin's incredible soaring voice on lead, and that could and should have been issued as a single.

In June 2012, The Miracles' Do It Baby album was released on CD, in a 2 in 1 package with their 1973 Renaissance album. With these two albums, The Miracles successfully moved away from the music and style of the Smokey Robinson era, and took an adventurous leap forward to a newer, more sophisticated sound, which would eventually result in the group's biggest hit ever with or without Smokey Robinson, 1976's multimillion selling #1 smash, "Love Machine".

== Track listing ==
Side one

1. "Do It Baby" (Freddie Perren, Christine Yarian)
2. "Up Again" (Perren, Yarian)
3. "Where Are You Going to My Love" (Billy Day, John Goodison, Tony Hillier, Mike Leslie)
4. "What Is a Heart Good For?" (Leon Ware, T-Boy Ross)
5. "You Are Love" (Perren, Yarian)

Side two

1. "Give Me Just Another Day" (Ware)
2. "We Feel the Same" (Clifton Davis)
3. "Calling Out Your Name" (Ware)
4. "A Foolish Thing to Say" (Jim Grady)
5. "Can't Get Ready for Losing You" (Willie Hutch, Richard Hutch)

== Personnel ==
The Miracles

- Billy Griffin
- Pete Moore
- Ronnie White
- Bobby Rogers

Additional personnel:

- Assorted Los Angeles studio musicians - instrumentation
- David Blumberg, James Anthony Carmichael, Willie Hutch, Freddie Perren, Gene Page, Michael Omartian, Jimmie Haskell - arrangements
