= The Power of Music (The Miracles album) =

Studio album by The Miracles
- Released: September 1976
- Genre: Soul
- Length: 40:04
- Language: English
- Label: Tamla
- Producers: Warren "Pete" Moore, Billy Griffin, Donald Griffin, John Barnes, Kevin Beamish, Wade Marcus

The Miracles chronology
City of Angels (1975)	The Power of Music (1976)	Love Crazy (1977)

The Power of Music is a 1976 studio album by American soul vocal group The Miracles. This was their final studio album with Motown after being with the label since the beginning when Smokey Robinson was the lead singer.

== Reception ==
Editors at AllMusic Guide rated this album two out of five stars, with critic Ed Hogan writing that Warren "Pete" Moore's production was "somewhat muddled", but pointed out several stand-out tracks. In the 1983 edition of The New Rolling Stone Record Guide, this album was scored two out of five stars. In 2011's The Encyclopedia of Popular Music, this album received two out of five stars.

== Track listing ==
All songs written by William Griffin and Warren "Pete" Moore

1. "The Power of Music" – 5:39
2. "Love to Make Love" – 4:59
3. "Can I Pretend" – 5:29
4. "Let the Children Play (Overture)" – 3:55
5. "Gossip" – 6:20
6. "Let the Children Play" – 4:13
7. "The Street of Love" – 3:00
8. "You Need a Miracle" – 6:16

== Personnel ==
The Miracles

- Billy Griffin – vocals, guitar, co-production
- Donald Griffin – vocals, guitar, co-production
- Warren "Pete" Moore – vocals, production
- Bobby Rogers – vocals
- Ronnie White – vocals

Additional personnel

- Jack Ashford – percussion
- John Barnes – keyboards, synthesizer, rhythm section arrangement, co-producer, horn arrangement, string arrangements
- Kevin Beamish – recording engineering, mixing, co-production
- Eddie "Bongo" Brown – bongos, congas
- Ollie E. Brown – drums, timbales
- Scott Edwards – bass guitar
- Willie Weeks – bass guitar
- James Gadson – drums, timbales
- Jimmy Johnson – gong
- Wade Marcus – horn arrangement, string arrangement, co-production
- Frank Mulvey – art direction
- Jeff Sanders – mastering
- Lenni Groves – vocals
- Julia Tillman – vocals
- Maxine Willard – vocals

== Chart performance ==
In Billboard magazine, The Power of Music reached No. 35 on the Top Soul LPs chart and No. 178 on the Top LPs & Tape chart.
