= Don't Cha Love It =

Studio album by The Miracles
- Released: 1975
- Genre: Soul
- Length: 36:23
- Language: English
- Label: Tamla
- Producer: Freddie Perren

The Miracles chronology
Do It Baby (1974)	Don't Cha Love It (1975)	City of Angels (1975)

Don't Cha Love It is a 1975 studio album by American soul vocal group The Miracles.

== Reception ==
Editors of AllMusic Guide scored this album 2.5 out of five stars, with reviewer Andrew Hamilton considering it "the weakest to date" due to lackluster lyrics by Christine Yarian and poor production choices by Freddie Perren. In the 1983 edition of The New Rolling Stone Record Guide, this album was scored three out of five stars. In 2011's The Encyclopedia of Popular Music, this album received two out of five stars.

== Track listing ==
1. "Keep on Keepin' On (Doin' What You Do)" (Richard Wyatt, Jr. and Christine Yarian) – 3:37
2. "Sweet Sweet Lovin'" (Edward L. Jones, Freddie Perren, and Yarian) – 3:45
3. "A Little Piece of Heaven" (Perren and Yarian) – 4:25
4. "Don't Cha Love It" (Perren and Yarian) – 3:20
5. "Got Me Goin' (Again)" (Perren and Yarian) – 3:47
6. "Gemini" (Perren, Pam St. Cyr, and Yarian) – 3:05
7. "Brokenhearted Girl – Brokenhearted Boy" (Elmer Hopper, Perren, and Yarian) – 4:05
8. "Take It All" (Perren and Yarian) – 3:40
9. "Gonna Tell the World (Wedding Song)" (Perren and Yarian) – 3:21
10. "You Are Love" (Perren and Yarian) – 3:22

== Personnel ==
The Miracles

- Billy Griffin – vocals
- Warren "Pete" Moore – vocals
- Bobby Rogers – vocals
- Ronnie White – vocals

Additional personnel

- Angel Balestier – engineering
- Val Garay – engineering
- Bob Gleason – illustration
- Eddy Manson – arrangement on "Got Me Goin' (Again)"
- Gene Page – arrangement on "Sweet Sweet Lovin'", "A Little Piece of Heaven", and "You Are Love"
- Freddie Perren – arrangement, production
- Katarina Petterson – art direction
- Jimmy Robinson – engineering
- Tom Sellers – arrangement on "Keep on Keepin' On (Doin' What You Do"), "Gemini", and "Gonna Tell the World (Wedding Song)"
- Art Stewart – engineering
- Richard Wyatt, Jr. – arrangement on "Keep on Keepin' On (Doin' What You Do)"

== Chart performance ==
Don't Cha Love It reached seventh on the Top R&B Albums and peaked at 96 on the Billboard 200.
