= Give Me Just Another Day =

- Dutch release picture sleeve

Single by The Miracles

from the album Do It Baby
- Released: November 8, 1973
- Recorded: Hitsville USA 1973
- Genre: Soul
- Length: 3:13
- Label: Tamla / T 54240F
- Songwriter: Leon Ware
- Producer: Hal Davis

The Miracles singles chronology
""Don't Let It End ('Til You Let It Begin)" (1973)	"Give Me Just Another Day" (1973)	"Do It Baby" (1974)

"Give Me Just Another Day" (T54240F) is a song written by Leon Ware and released as a single in 1973 by Motown R&B group The Miracles, issued on that label's Tamla Records subsidiary. It was the first single release from the group's album, Do It Baby, which was released the following year.

The second single release by the group featuring new lead singer Billy Griffin, who had replaced the group's original lead singer Bill "Smokey" Robinson, the song was written by Motown staff songwriter Leon Ware, who, up until this point, had written and composed for several Motown acts, including Marvin Gaye, The Isley Brothers, Michael Jackson, and Junior Walker & the All Stars, among others .

Hal Davis was the song's producer, and it was arranged by James Carmichael, who went on to become one of the main architects behind the success of Motown group The Commodores later in the decade. There were two different mixes of the song. The single release features the background vocals by Miracles Bobby Rogers, Pete Moore, and Ronnie White much more prominently than the album version, giving it more of a "group" feel, while the album mix barely features their vocals at all, almost making it seem like a Billy Griffin "solo" performance.

This song was not a big success, failing to reach the Billboard Hot 100, peaking at No. 11 on the Bubbling Under chart, and reached No. 47 on the Billboard R&B chart.

Despite this song's initial chart failure, however, it has since gained new life and become a valuable part of the Motown Catalogue as a much-covered and sampled song by hip-hop artists, including Young Jeezy, Schoolboy Q, Jay-Z, Marco Polo, Wade Waters, Christina Milian, and Rick Ross.

"Give Me Just Another Day" was released on CD in the 2003 Motown compilation,The Miracles: Love Machine- The 70's Collection and was also released in 2012 in The Motown 2-in-1-CD set, Renaissance/Do It Baby, a collection of the Miracles' first two complete albums with Billy Griffin.

== Personnel ==
- Billy Griffin - lead vocals
- Bobby Rogers - tenor background vocals
- Ronnie White - baritone background vocals
- Warren "Pete" Moore - bass background vocals/vocal arrangements
