= The Miracles (album) =

Studio album by The Miracles
- Released: 1978
- Genre: Soul
- Length: 29:48
- Language: English
- Label: Columbia

The Miracles chronology
Love Crazy (1977)	The Miracles (1978)

The Miracles is a 1978 studio album by American soul vocal group The Miracles. It is their last of two albums released during their stint on Columbia Records. Lead vocalist Billy Griffin left the group to pursue his solo career and Pete Moore retired from touring, which led to their initial disbandment.

== Reception ==
In the 1983 edition of The New Rolling Stone Record Guide, this album was scored three out of five stars. In 2011's The Encyclopedia of Popular Music, this album received two out of five stars.

== Track listing ==
1. "I Can’t Stand It" – 3:16
2. "Love Doctor" – 3:52
3. "The Magic of Your Eyes (Laura’s Eyes)" – 4:07
4. "Freeway" – 4:19
5. "Hot Dance" – 2:59
6. "Mean Machine" – 3:16
7. "Sad Rain" – 4:16
8. "Reach for the Sky" – 3:42

== Personnel ==
The Miracles

- Billy Griffin – vocals
- Donald Griffin – guitar
- Warren "Pete" Moore – vocals
- Bobby Rogers – vocals
- Ronnie White – vocals

Additional personnel

- Dorothy Ashby – harp on "Sad Rain"
- Michael Boddicker – keyboards
- David Foster – keyboards
- Larry Nash – keyboards
- Raymond Pounds – drums
- Stevie Wonder – keyboards
- Nathan Watts – bass guitar

== Chart performance ==
The Miracles did not chart, but "Mean Machine" reached 55 on the Billboard R&B Singles chart.
