= Bullish (album) =

Studio album by Herb Alpert and the Tijuana Brass
- Released: 1984
- Studio: A&M (Hollywood, California)
- Genre: Jazz, Funk-synth
- Label: A&M
- Producer: Herb Alpert

Bullish is a 1984 album credited to Herb Alpert and the Tijuana Brass, though the Tijuana Brass was not involved in its making. The album was reissued in 2017. The music of the album is mostly electro-funk, with Alpert's characteristic trumpet in accompaniment. The album is mostly instrumental, though Lani Hall provides vocals on the track "Maniac". Describing the album in 1984, Alpert said, "I don't think of this as a backward-looking record ... It's very contemporary."

== Reception ==
"Bullish" had limited success on the charts and somewhat favorable reviews. Writing for The Washington Post, Mike Joyce described the album as a mixture of the sounds of the older Tijuana Brass and the newer dance hits of the 1970s. He noted, "The ballad 'Always Have a Dream' ... is equipped with the sort of lilting melody that Alpert's tart trumpet always accommodated handsomely back then, [and] 'Passion Play' is another reminder of those Latin rhythms." But, he added, "Many of the tracks on 'Bullish' seem more inspired by the dance hits Alpert had in the disco era." In the same review, the track "Maniac" was poorly received, as "a rather odd choice for a Brass reunion; nor can singer Lani Hall keep the tune from sounding dated and miscast".

The album peaked at #28 on the Billboard Jazz Albums chart, in October 1984. The "Bullish" single peaked at #90 on the Billboard Hot 100 chart in September 1984.

Title	Chart	Peak position	Peak Date	Weeks on chart
Bullish	Hot 100	90	14-Sep-1984	2
Bullish (Album)	Billboard 200	75	28-Sep-1984	10
Bullish	Dance Club Songs	54	26-Oct-1984	4
Bullish (Album)	Traditional Jazz Albums	28	19-Oct-1984	11
Bullish	Adult Contemporary	22	14-Sep-1984	9

== Track listing ==
1. "Bullish" (Jimmie Cameron) – 4:47
2. "Always Have a Dream (Pour Le Coeur, A Mon Pere)" (John Barnes) – 6:15
3. "Make a Wish" (Barnes, Herb Alpert, Billy Griffin) – 4:33
4. "Maniac" (Dennis Matkosky, Michael Sembello) – 3:52
5. "Struttin' on Five" (Randy Badazz, Dana Barry) – 3:33
6. "Love without Words" (Alpert, Barnes) – 4:23
7. "Passion Play" (Alpert, Barnes) – 5:35
8. "Life Is My Song" (Alpert, Barnes) – 6:26

== Personnel ==
- Herb Alpert – trumpets, backing vocals
- John Barnes – keyboards (1–4, 6–8)
- Derek Nakamoto – keyboards, backing vocals
- Andy Armer – keyboards (5), arrangements (5)
- Charles Fearing – guitars
- Kevin Brandon – acoustic bass
- Dan Marfisi – drum effects
- Paulinho da Costa – percussion
- Randy Badazz – arrangements (5)
- Billy Griffin – backing vocals
- Lani Hall – backing vocals, lead vocals (4)
- Marva King – backing vocals

=== Production ===
- Herb Alpert – producer
- John Barnes – producer (1–4, 6–8)
- Randy Badazz – producer (5)
- Derek Nakamoto – associate producer
- Robert de la Garza – engineer
- Paul McKenna – engineer
- Bill Bottrell – mixing (1–3, 5–8)
- Brian Malouf – mixing (4)
- Bernie Grundman – mastering at Bernie Grundman Mastering (Hollywood, California)
- Richard Frankel – art direction
- Norman Moore – art direction, design
- Larry Williams – photography
- Jerry Kramer and Mental Management – personal direction

== Additional sources ==
- Fanfare. J. Flegler. 1985.
