= Renaissance (The Miracles album) =

Studio album by The Miracles
- Released: April 18, 1973
- Recorded: 1972
- Genre: Soul
- Length: 32:23
- Label: Tamla
- Producers: Hal Davis, Willie Hutch, Fonce Mizell, Freddie Perren, Marvin Gaye, Frank Wilson, Clay McMurray, Leonard Caston, Jerry Marcellino, Mel Larson

The Miracles chronology
1957-1972 (1972)	Renaissance (1973)	Anthology (1974)

Singles from Renaissance
- 1. "Don't Let It End ('Til You Let It Begin)" Released: June 7, 1973

Renaissance is a 1973 album by R&B group The Miracles on Motown Records' Tamla label. It was the first album by the group not to feature original lead singer Smokey Robinson on lead vocals, instead featuring him as executive producer. Robinson was replaced by lead singer Billy Griffin.

== History ==
Once Robinson decided to retire from the group to concentrate on his duties as Vice President of the Motown Record Corporation, Miracles member Claudette Robinson (Smokey's wife) decided to leave as well. Marv Tarplin, after staying for a year, decided to leave the Miracles and began touring and working with Smokey Robinson. Claudette Robinson retired to concentrate on raising the couple's two children, Berry and Tamla. The other Miracles, Bobby Rogers, Pete Moore, and Ronnie White, conducted a nationwide search for a singer to replace Smokey Robinson. After auditioning some 60 hopefuls, the group decided on Billy Griffin, a native of Baltimore, Maryland. In the 2006 Miracles DVD release The Definitive Performances (1963-1987), Miracles Pete Moore and Bobby Rogers commented that the group decided on Griffin because, in addition to being a great singer, he also demonstrated some songwriting ability. Smokey Robinson served as the album's executive producer, and wrote in the album's liner notes that Griffin was "a determined young man with a fresh new sound, who is sure to become dynamic in the industry".

Renaissance included several songs from noted writer-producers, including Marvin Gaye, Willie Hutch, Leon Ware, Fonce Mizell, Freddie Perren, and Pam Sawyer. The album's first intended single was "What Is a Heart Good For", which was performed by the group on a July 13, 1973 telecast on NBC's The Midnight Special, which marked the group's first national television appearance with Griffin and was hosted by Smokey Robinson himself. The Miracles also performed the song on June 23, 1973, and a repeat performance on a September 28, 1974 telecast of Don Cornelius's "Soul Train". Radio began playing the uptempo single, when it was withdrawn, and replaced with a ballad "Don't Let It End ('Til You Let It Begin)".

== Release ==
Several songs from Renaissance appear on the 2003 Motown compilation CD The Miracles-Love Machine: The 70's Collection. Renaissance was released on CD in June 2012 as a bundle with the Miracles' 1974 album Do It Baby.

== Reception ==
Professional ratings
Review scores
Source	Rating
Allmusic	4/5 stars

"Don't Let It End ('Til You Let It Begin)" only reached #56 Pop, #26 R&B on the Billboard chart. Without a big hit single to promote it, Renaissance only reached #174 Pop, #33 R&B on the Billboard album chart. Critics at the time gave the album almost universally positive reviews. The group's next album, Do It Baby, based on their #13 million-selling hit single of the same name, would fare far better.

== Track listing ==
All lead vocals by Billy Griffin, except where noted.

Side one

1. "What is a Heart Good For" (Arthur Ross, Leon Ware)
2. "If You're Ever in the Neighborhood" (Don Fenceton, Jerry Marcellino, Mel Larson)
3. "I Wanna Be With You" (Willie Hutch)
4. "Wigs and Lashes" (Larry Mizell) (lead vocals: Billy Griffin, Ronnie White)
5. "Don't Let It End ('Til You Let It Begin)" (Christine Yarian, Freddie Perren) (lead vocals: Billy Griffin, Ronnie White; spoken word segment: Bobby Rogers)

Side two

1. "I Love You Secretly" (Anna Gordy Gaye, Elgie Stover, Marvin Gaye)
2. "I Don't Need No Reason" (Leon Ware, Pam Sawyer)
3. "Nowhere To Go" (Clay McMurray, Dennis Jackson, Gary Fears) (lead vocals: Billy Griffin, Pete Moore, Ronnie White, Bobby Rogers)
4. "I Didn't Realize The Show Was Over" (Richard Hutch, Willie Hutch)

== Personnel ==
- Billy Griffin - lead vocals
- Ronnie White - baritone backing vocals
- Pete Moore - bass backing vocals
- Bobby Rogers - tenor backing vocals
- Marv Tarplin - guitar
- Smokey Robinson - executive producer
- Assorted Los Angeles studio musicians - instrumentation

== Charts ==
Year	Album	Chart positions	
Year	Album	US	US R&B
1973	Renaissance	174	33

=== Singles ===
Year	Singles	Chart positions	
Year	Singles	US	US R&B
1973	"Don't Let It End ('Til You Let It Begin)"	56	26
1973	"What Is A Heart Good For"*	withdrawn	withdrawn
