= I Don't Blame You at All =

- German release picture sleeve

Single by The Miracles

from the album One Dozen Roses
- B-side: "Oh Baby Baby I Love You"
- Released: February 25, 1971
- Recorded: Hitsville USA (Studio A); January 15, 1971
- Genre: Pop/soul
- Length: 3:05
- Label: Tamla; T 54205
- Songwriter(s): Smokey Robinson
- Producer(s): Terry "Buzzy" Johnson; Smokey Robinson

The Miracles singles chronology
"The Tears of a Clown" (1970)	"I Don't Blame You at All" (1971)	"Crazy About the La La La" (1971)

"I Don't Blame You At All" was a 1971 R&B song by The Miracles (also known as Smokey Robinson & The Miracles) on Motown Records' Tamla label. It was composed by Miracles lead singer, William "Smokey" Robinson, produced by Robinson and Terry "Buzzy" Johnson, and was taken from their album, One Dozen Roses. This song was actually the follow-up hit to their #1 smash, "The Tears of a Clown", and reached the Top 20 of the Billboard Hot 100, charting at #18, and the Top 10 of the Billboard R&B chart, peaking at #7. It was also a Top 20 hit in the UK, reaching #11 on the British charts that year. It is also noted as the group's last Top 20 pop hit before Smokey Robinson's departure from The Miracles the following year, and was performed by the group on Dick Clark's American Bandstand on an episode dated July 10, 1971.

== Background ==
The song is a sad, mournful tune that belies its up-tempo nature. Smokey, as the song's narrator, tells a girl that he obviously wants (who does not reciprocate his feelings) that he doesn't blame her for "playing it cool" when she decides to call off the relationship. Lamenting the fact that his attraction to her covered the fact that she had just casual feelings for him, he sings:

"I don't blame you at all, 'cause you played it cool
You don't owe me a thing 'cause I was a fool
I'm only paying the price
For a trip I took to Paradise
'Cause I looked into a pair of eyes, and what I thought was The Look Of Love
Was only hurt in disguise"

"I Don't Blame You At All" was the group's final big hit with Robinson, though the Miracles did continue to chart several times before his departure, with songs including "Satisfaction", "I Can't Stand To See You Cry", and "We've Come Too Far to End It Now". This song has inspired a cover version by Rosetta Hightower, and appears on many Miracles' "Greatest Hits" album and CD compilations.

== Personnel ==
The Miracles

- Smokey Robinson
- Claudette Rogers Robinson
- Pete Moore
- Ronnie White
- Bobby Rogers
- Marv Tarplin

Additional instruments

- The Funk Brothers

== Chart performance ==
Chart (1971)	Peak position
UK Singles (The Official Charts Company)	11
US Billboard Hot 100	18
US Billboard Best Selling Soul Singles	7
