= Bad Girl (The Miracles song) =

Single by The Miracles

from the album Greatest Hits from the Beginning
- B-side: "I Love Your Baby"
- Released: August 30, 1959 (Chess); September 6, 1959 (Motown)
- Recorded: July 1959
- Genre: Soul, doo-wop
- Length: 2:44
- Label: Chess 1743; Motown G 1/TXL 2207; REO 8423X
- Songwriter(s): Berry Gordy, Jr., Smokey Robinson
- Producer(s): Berry Gordy, Jr.

The Miracles singles chronology
"It" (1959)	"Bad Girl" (1959)	"The Feeling Is So Fine" / "(You Can) Depend on Me" (1959)

"Bad Girl" is a 1959 doo-wop single by The Miracles. Issued locally on the Motown Records label, it was licensed to and issued nationally by Chess Records because the fledgling Motown Record Corporation did not, at that time, have national distribution. It was the first single released (and the only one released by this group) on the Motown label – all previous singles from the company (and all following ones from the group) were released on Motown's Tamla label. Although The Miracles had charted regionally and on the R&B charts with several earlier songs, including "Got a Job", "I Cry", "I Need a Change", and "(You Can) Depend on Me", "Bad Girl" was their first national chart hit, reaching #93 on the Billboard Hot 100. Written by Miracles lead singer Smokey Robinson and Motown Records' President and Founder Berry Gordy, "Bad Girl" is a sad, remorseful ballad about a young woman, whom Robinson, as the narrator, says "was so good at the start", but who later in the song "is breaking my heart". It is in the popular doo-wop style, as several of The Miracles' songs were during the late 1950s. The record's success, coupled with the distributor's failure to pay Gordy and The Miracles properly for its sales, prompted Robinson to urge Gordy to "go national" with it, meaning that Motown should do its own national distribution of its songs, and eliminate the middleman, to ensure that all money from sales of its records would go directly to the label.

On the Motown/Universal DVD Smokey Robinson and The Miracles: The Definitive Performances 1963-1987, Robinson and fellow Miracles Bobby Rogers and Pete Moore commented that the song's success allowed the group to tour nationally for the first time, and to play New York's legendary Apollo Theatre during the Ray Charles Show. The group was not ready for the appearance: it lacked performance experience and failed to produce professional big band arrangements to the satisfaction of theatre manager Honi Coles. Ray Charles intervened, took the group under his wing, and, with his band, created arrangements for their songs. Charles was one of the first to help them on their climb to eventual success.

"Bad Girl" has since become a doo-wop classic and was named one of the 100 Greatest Doo-Wop Songs of All Time by Doo Wop Nation. It appears on several Miracles' compilations, including Greatest Hits from the Beginning. The song was also performed by the group on their final live album, 1957–1972. It has been covered by the Dazz Band, Jackie Jackson and by fellow Motown artist Mary Wells, whose version was called "Bad Boy" and appeared on her debut album, Bye Bye Baby I Don't Want to Take a Chance.

== Personnel ==
- Lead vocals by Smokey Robinson
- Backing vocals by Claudette Rogers Robinson, Bobby Rogers, Ronnie White, Pete Moore
- Guitar by Marv Tarplin
- Other instrumentation by The Funk Brothers
  - Flute by Thomas "Beans" Bowles

== Other sources ==
- Smokey Robinson & The Miracles: The Definitive Performances 1963-1987
- Smokey: Inside My Life (autobiography), McGraw-Hill, (1989) by Smokey Robinson and David Ritz, pp. 84–86.
- Doo Wop Nation's Top 100 Doo-Wop Songs of All Time
