= One Dozen Roses =

Studio album by Smokey Robinson & the Miracles
- Released: 27 August 1971
- Recorded: 1966, 1969–1971
- Genre: Soul
- Label: Tamla; TS 312L
- Producer: Smokey Robinson; Henry Cosby

Smokey Robinson & the Miracles chronology
The Season for Miracles (1970)	One Dozen Roses (1971)	Flying High Together (1972)

Singles from One Dozen Roses
- 1. "I Don't Blame You at All" Released: February 25, 1971; 2. "Crazy About The La La La" Released: June 8, 1971; 3. "Satisfaction" Released: October 26, 1971

Professional ratings
Review scores
Source	Rating
AllMusic	4.5/5 stars
Christgau's Record Guide	B+

One Dozen Roses is a 1971 album by Smokey Robinson & The Miracles, issued on Motown Records' Tamla label. The penultimate album before lead singer Smokey Robinson departed the group for a solo career, One Dozen Roses features the Top 20 Billboard Hot 100 hit single "I Don't Blame You at All". Also included is the group's number-one smash hit "The Tears of a Clown", which was also made available through the reissue of the 1967 Miracles LP Make It Happen as The Tears of a Clown. Both of these songs were also huge hits in the UK, reaching #11 and #1 respectively.

The album's cover depicts Robinson, (with fellow Miracles Bobby Rogers, Pete Moore, and Ronnie White), picking a solitary rose for his wife, Miracles member Claudette Robinson, who is pictured on the cover holding the rose given her by her husband.

Other tracks on One Dozen Roses include the charting singles "Satisfaction" and "Crazy About The La La La", both of which peaked below number 40 on the Hot 100, the ballad "That Girl", which served as the "b" side to I Don't Blame You at All, "When Sundown Comes", which was actually earmarked as a single "A" side release (but was withdrawn in favor of "Satisfaction", the topical spoken word song "No Wonder Love's a Wonder", and The Miracles' own cover of The Marvelettes' Top 20 Robinson-composed hit, "The Hunter Gets Captured by the Game". Four Tops bass singer Renaldo "Obie" Benson is a contributing co-writer on the song, "Oh Baby Baby I Love You," and Miracle Marv Tarplin co-wrote with Robinson on two songs. The album cover features Miracles background vocalist Claudette Rogers Robinson, wife of Smokey Robinson. This was the first Miracles album to feature her on the cover since 1963's The Fabulous Miracles (and the group's aborted 1964 album I Like It Like That).

As of 2019, this album has not been released on CD.

== Track listing ==
Side one

1. "When Sundown Comes" (Smokey Robinson, Marv Tarplin)
2. "No Wonder Love's a Wonder" (Robinson, Tarplin, Al Cleveland)
3. "The Tears of a Clown" (Robinson, Hank Cosby, Stevie Wonder)
4. "Satisfaction" (Robinson)
5. "Crazy About The La La La" (Robinson)
6. "Cecilia" (Paul Simon)

Side two

1. "I Don't Blame You at All" (Robinson)
2. "That Girl" (Joe Hinton, Cosby, Candice Ghant)
3. "Faces" (Jack Goga)
4. "I Love You Dear" (Clay McMurray, John Glover, Pam Sawyer)
5. "Oh Baby Baby I Love You" (Robinson, Cleveland, Obie Benson)
6. "The Hunter Gets Captured by the Game" (Robinson)

== Personnel ==
The Miracles

- Smokey Robinson – lead vocals, producer
- Marv Tarplin – guitar
- Ronnie White, Bobby Rogers, Warren "Pete" Moore, Claudette Robinson – backing vocals

Additional musicians and production

- Henry Cosby – producer
- The Funk Brothers – instrumentation
