= What Love Has...Joined Together (album) =

Studio album by Smokey Robinson & the Miracles
- Released: April 28, 1970
- Recorded: 1970
- Studio: Hitsville USA, Detroit
- Genre: Soul
- Length: 27:36
- Label: Tamla
- Producer: Smokey Robinson

Smokey Robinson & the Miracles chronology
Four in Blue (1969)	What Love Has...Joined Together (1970)	A Pocket Full of Miracles (1970)

What Love Has...Joined Together is a 1970 album by R&B group Smokey Robinson & The Miracles on Motown Records' Tamla label. A concept album consisting solely of six love songs, it charted at number 97 on the Billboard Top 200 Album chart, and reached the Top 10 of Billboard's R&B album chart, peaking at number 9. It was the first Miracles album to have no new songs; the recordings are all cover versions of songs written by noted composers, such as Stevie Wonder ("My Cherie Amour"), Berry Gordy, Frank Wilson, Brenda Holloway and her sister Patrice Holloway ("You've Made Me So Very Happy"), Burt Bacharach and Hal David ("This Guy's in Love With You"), Marvin Gaye ("If This World Were Mine"), The Beatles' John Lennon & Paul McCartney, ("And I Love Her"), and Miracles members Smokey Robinson and Bobby Rogers ("What Love Has Joined Together").

The Miracles performed a medley of this album's songs on a 1970 telecast of NBC's The Andy Williams Show. What Love Has...Joined Together features Miracles members Smokey Robinson, Bobby Rogers, Pete Moore and Ronnie White on the front cover, and Claudette Robinson on the back cover. Miracles member Marv Tarplin played guitar on this album, but was not featured on its cover.

== Release ==
What Love Has....Joined Together was released on CD in 1992. In 2013, Motown released the album as a digital download to various online retailers.

== Reception ==
Professional ratings
Review scores
Source	Rating
Allmusic	link
Christgau's Record Guide	B+

AllMusic called it "A stunning concept album that should have fared better". The New Yorker, in an article dated April 16, 2013, referred to this album as "A standout", and as "one of the rare jewels in the (Motown) label's crown".

== Track listing ==
=== Side one ===
1. "What Love Has Joined Together" (Smokey Robinson, Bobby Rogers) 5:50
2. "My Cherie Amour" (Stevie Wonder, Hank Cosby, Sylvia Moy) 4:16
3. "If This World Were Mine" (Marvin Gaye) 4:30

=== Side two ===
1. "You've Made Me So Very Happy" (Frank Wilson, Patrice Holloway, Berry Gordy, Brenda Holloway) 5:04
2. "This Guy's in Love With You" (Burt Bacharach, Hal David) 5:19
3. "And I Love Her" (John Lennon, Paul McCartney) 2:37

== Personnel ==
=== The Miracles ===
- Smokey Robinson – lead vocals, production
- Claudette Robinson – lead vocals, backing vocals
- Bobby Rogers – backing vocals
- Pete Moore – backing vocals
- Ronnie White – backing vocals
- Marv Tarplin – guitar

=== Other instrumentation ===
- The Funk Brothers
