= The Season for Miracles =

Studio album by Smokey Robinson & the Miracles
- Released: November 23, 1970
- Genres: Soul, Christmas
- Length: 37:41
- Language: English
- Label: Tamla

Smokey Robinson & the Miracles chronology
A Pocket Full of Miracles (1970)	The Season for Miracles (1970)	One Dozen Roses (1971)

The Season for Miracles is a 1970 studio album by the American soul group Smokey Robinson & the Miracles. The Christmas album has received positive reviews and has been a strong seller for Motown, being reissued on compact disc in 1992.

== Reception ==
=== Critical reception ===
A brief review in Billboard recommended this release as being a "joyous" and "delightful holiday package". The editors of AllMusic Guide scored this album three out of five stars, but do not have a detailed review. The publication does review the 1973 various artists compilation A Motown Christmas, which includes tracks from this album and critic Jason Ankeny calls that an "outstanding sampler" of music that includes a "beautifully soulful vibe". In 2011's The Encyclopedia of Popular Music, this album received three out of five stars.

=== Sales ===
Although this release did not sell well enough to chart, a 1987 review of the best-selling Christmas albums by Ebony notes that this is one of the best-selling from Motown.

== Track listing ==
Side one

1. "Deck the Halls"/"Bring a Torch, Jeannette, Isabella" (traditional) – 4:03
2. "God Rest Ye Merry Gentlemen" (traditional) – 3:06
3. "I Can Tell When Christmas Is Near" (Stevie Wonder) – 3:02
4. "I Believe in Christmas Eve" (Smokey Robinson) – 2:03
5. "The Christmas Song" (Mel Tormé and Robert Wells) – 3:27
6. "Jingle Bells" (James Lord Pierpont) – 2:47

Side two

1. "It's Christmas Time" (Wonder) – 3:27
2. "Go Tell It on the Mountain" (John Wesley Work Jr. and traditional) – 3:45
3. "Away in a Manger"/"Coventry Carol" (William James Kirkpatrick / traditional) – 2:23
4. "Peace on Earth (Good Will Toward Men)" (A. Roach) – 3:03
5. "The Day That Love Began" (Deborah Miller and Ron Miller) – 3:53
6. "A Child Is Waiting" (Joe Hinton and Patti Jerome) – 2:42

== Personnel ==
The Miracles

- Warren "Pete" Moore – bass vocals
- Claudette Rogers Robinson – vocals
- Smokey Robinson – lead vocals
- Bobby Rogers – tenor vocals
- Marv Tarplin – vocals
- Ronnie White – baritone vocals

Additional personnel

- Jim Hendin – photography
- Wade Marcus – arrangement on "God Rest Ye Merry Gentlemen"
- Curtis McNair – artwork, design
- Jimmy Roach – arrangement on "Deck the Halls"/"Bring a Torch, Jeannette, Isabella", "Go Tell It on the Mountain", "Away in a Manger"/"Coventry Carol", and "Peace on Earth (Good Will Toward Men)"
- Tom Schlesinger – graphic supervision
- David Van De Pitte – arrangement
