= We've Come Too Far to End It Now =

Single by The Miracles

from the album Flying High Together
- B-side: "When Sundown Comes"
- Released: April 25, 1972
- Recorded: Hitsville USA (Studio A); September 21, 1971
- Genre: Soul
- Length: 2:48
- Label: Tamla / T 54220
- Songwriter(s): Johnny Bristol; David H.Jones; Wade Brown
- Producer(s): Johnny Bristol

The Miracles singles chronology
"Satisfaction" (1971)	"We've Come Too Far to End It Now" (1972)	"I Can't Stand To See You Cry" (1972)

We've Come Too Far to End It Now was a 1972 single by Motown Records R&B group The Miracles (AKA 'Smokey Robinson & The Miracles') on its Tamla Label subsidiary (T54220F) and taken from their 1972 album, Flying High Together, the group's final studio album with original lead singer Smokey Robinson. This song charted at #46 on the Billboard Pop Chart, and reached the Top 10 of its R&B chart, peaking at #9.

== Background ==
Written by Motown staff songwriter Johnny Bristol, along with writers David H. Jones, and Wade Brown, and arranged by legendary writer/producer H. B. Barnum, this song was conceived as the Miracles' "swan song" with Robinson, who left the group shortly thereafter (even though the group actually had one more single release with Robinson from that same LP, "I Can't Stand To See You Cry", this song was the group's way of saying goodbye to the Smokey Robinson era and Smokey's way of saying goodbye to the group's fans and to his friends and singing partners in The Miracles, Bobby Rogers, Pete Moore, and Ronnie White). Motown singer/songwriter Johnny Bristol also co-wrote The Supremes' final hit with Diana Ross, "Someday We'll Be Together").

After singing in the group from 1955 until 1972, Robinson decided to retire from the group to spend more time with his family, and to concentrate on his duties as Vice President of the Motown Record Corporation. His wife, and fellow Miracles member Claudette Robinson, left the group when her husband did. Despite having retired from live performances eight years prior in 1964, Claudette continued recording with the group in the studio, finally retiring in 1972 to raise the couple's two children, Berry and Tamla. Marv Tarplin stayed with the group an additional year, then decided to leave the Miracles to work with Smokey, writing songs and eventually touring with him, once Robinson decided to do limited touring as a solo artist.

Like the Miracles' 1965 hit, "Ooo Baby Baby", "We've Come Too Far" told the story of a troubled long-time relationship between a couple nearing a breakup, with Smokey, as the song's narrator, apologizing to his wife for his wrongs, with the hopes of saving the relationship:

- Last night ... we had an argument ...
- Oh but baby ... the things I said I never meant ...
- I'm so sorry, that I broke your tender heart ...
- For we've come too far to end it now.

In the 2006 Motown DVD, Smokey Robinson & The Miracles: The Definitive Performances), Miracles bass singer and vocal arranger Pete Moore replied, when asked about Smokey's decision to depart the group, said it made him "very sad, because we had been together for so long, since we were kids, and had done so many wonderful things in the music industry up to that point ... and obviously, we didn't want to see Smokey leave ... because we loved him and he loved us ... so it took us a while ... for that idea to sink in ... but once it did ... we had to seek a replacement ..."

This song has appeared in several Miracles "greatest hits" CD compilations. It was also performed by The Miracles live on their final live album with Smokey, Smokey Robinson & The Miracles: 1957-1972. The song's B-side, "When Sundown Comes", was earmarked as an A-side release, (Tamla 54211), but was cancelled in favor of the song "Satisfaction".

== Credits: The Miracles ==
- Lead vocals by Smokey Robinson
- Backing vocals by Pete Moore, Claudette Robinson, Ronnie White and Bobby Rogers
- Guitar by Marv Tarplin
- Additional instrumentation by The Funk Brothers

== Chart performance ==
Chart (1972)	Peak position
US Billboard Hot 100	46
US Billboard Best Selling Soul Singles	9

== Cover versions ==
- The Escorts recorded a cover version of this song.
