= Love Crazy (The Miracles album) =

Studio album by The Miracles
- Released: February 1977
- Recorded: 1976 – 1977
- Studio: Crystal Sound Studios, Hollywood, CA
- Genre: Soul; progressive soul; funk; disco
- Length: 38:00
- Label: Columbia
- Producer: Pete Moore; Billy Griffin; James Barnes; Kevin Beamish; Wade Marcus

The Miracles chronology
| Greatest Hits (with Billy Griffin) (1977) | Love Crazy (1977) | The Miracles (1978) |

Singles from Love Crazy
- 1. "Spy For Brotherhood" / "The Bird Must Fly Away" Released: 1976; 2. "Women (Make The World Go 'Round)" / "I Can Touch The Sky" Released: 1977

Professional ratings
Review scores
| Source | Rating |
|---|---|
| AllMusic | 1.5/5 stars |

Love Crazy is an album by American R&B group The Miracles featuring singer Billy Griffin, released via Columbia Records in 1977. The album is the first of two albums released on their new label following their departure from Motown.

== Background ==
When the group's contract with Motown had expired, they were advised to "wait for six months" to discuss a new contract, but instead, the group took on an offer to sign with Columbia Records. Following this, Billy Griffin's brother Donald Griffin joined them on lead guitar, replacing Marv Tarplin. The group immediately had problems after signing with Columbia, starting with the release of their first single on Columbia, "Spy For Brotherhood". Columbia expected controversy from the single as well as possible threats from the FBI and the CIA, and thus they withdrew the song from the airwaves, leading to the failure of the single and the album to become big hits.

== Track listing ==
All tracks are written by Billy Griffin and Pete Moore, except where noted.

Side one
| No. | Title | Length |
|---|---|---|
| 1. | "Love Crazy Introduction" | 1:17 |
| 2. | "Love Crazy / Love Crazy Overture" | 5:35 |
| 3. | "Too Young" | 6:43 |
| 4. | "Spy For Brotherhood" | 6:04 |
| Total length: | | 19:39 |

| No. | Title | Writer(s) | Length |
|---|---|---|---|
| 5. | "A Better Way To Live" | | 5:31 |
| 6. | "Women (Make The World Go 'Round)" | Billy Griffin, Donald Griffin, Pete Moore | 4:47 |
| 7. | "The Bird Must Fly Away" | | 4:30 |
| 8. | "I Can Touch The Sky" | Billy Griffin, Donald Griffin, Pete Moore | 3:33 |
| Total length: | | | 18:21 |

== Personnel ==
Adapted from Discogs.

Musicians

The Miracles:

- Billy Griffin – lead vocals, guitar
- Pete Moore – backing vocals, lead vocals (track: "Too Young")
- Ronnie White – backing vocals
- Bobby Rogers – backing vocals
- Donald Griffin – guitar

Session musicians:

- Julia Tillman, Maxine Willard, Myrna Matthews – backing vocals
- Willie Weeks – bass
- James Gadson – drums
- Eddie "Bongo" Brown – bongos, congas
- Jack Ashford – percussion
- John Barnes – keyboards, synthesizer
- Jackie Kelso – tenor saxophone (track: "Too Young")
- Buell Neidlinger – contrabass (track: "Too Young")

Production

- Pete Moore – producer, vocal arrangements
- Billy Griffin – vocal arrangements
- John Barnes – rhythm arrangements, strings and horns arrangements
- The Whizz Kids (Bill Griffin, James Barnes, Kevin Beamish, Wade Marcus) – co-producer (production assistant)
- Wade Marcus – strings and horns arrangements
- Daniel Wyman – synthesizer programmer
- Kevin Beamish – recording engineer
- Jeff Sanders – mastering engineer
- Charles Veal – strings and horns contractor
- Ivy Skoff – production coordinator
- Alan Bergman – photographer
- Marty Pichinson – manager

== Charts ==
| Chart (1977) | Peak position |
|---|---|
| US Billboard 200 | 117 |
| US Top R&B/Hip-Hop Albums (Billboard) | 31 |
