= Do It Baby =

Single by The Miracles

from the album Do It Baby
- B-side: "I Wanna Be With You"
- Released: August 1974
- Genre: R&B
- Length: 2:55
- Label: Tamla
- Songwriters: Freddie Perren, Christine Yarian
- Producer: Freddie Perren

The Miracles singles chronology
"Give Me Just Another Day" (1973)	"Do It Baby" (1974)	"Don't Cha Love It" (1974)

"Do It Baby" is a 1974 single recorded and released by the Motown R&B group The Miracles. The song was taken from the album of the same name, and written by Motown staff songwriters Freddie Perren and Christine Yarian and produced by Perren.

== Background ==
"Do It Baby" marked the soul quintet's first top 40 hit over a year and a half after the departure of the group's most important member, former leader Smokey Robinson and the inclusion of Billy Griffin, who took over Robinson's lead position in 1973.

The song's production also was a far departure from the group's earliest sounds as they embraced a funkier production style. The single was released on the group's 1974 album of the same name and reached the Billboard Pop Top 20, selling over one million copies. In addition to Billy Griffin, his brother, new Miracles member Donald Griffin, replaced original Miracle Marv Tarplin on guitar. Tarplin continued to tour and work with Smokey Robinson. The Miracles can be seen performing Do It Baby on the Motown/Universal DVD release: The Miracles: The Definitive Performances (1963-1987).

== Chart performance ==
"Do It Baby" peaked at number 13 on the Billboard Hot 100 and The Top 10 on the Hot Selling Soul Singles chart in early 1974, peaking at #4, and would remain their biggest post-Robinson hit until the 1975 release of "Love Machine", which was one of the group's only two singles to reach number-one on the Billboard Hot 100. Some radio stations banned the song as being too suggestive of sexuality, which was why the song did not get into the top 10 on the Billboard Hot 100 singles charts.

== Personnel: The Miracles ==
- Billy Griffin: lead vocals
- Ronnie White, Pete Moore and Bobby Rogers: background vocals
- Donald Griffin: guitar

=== Other credits ===
- The Funk Brothers: instrumentation

== Chart history ==
=== Weekly charts ===
Chart (1974)	Peak position
Canada RPM Top Singles	21
U.S. Billboard Hot 100	13
U.S. Billboard R&B	4
U.S. Cash Box Top 100	10
Chart (1975)	Peak position
Australia (Kent Music Report)	96

=== Year-end charts ===
Chart (1974)	Rank
Canada	183
U.S. (Joel Whitburn's Pop Annual)	125

== Cover versions ==
- This song has inspired cover versions by Jimmy Ponder.
- Red Holt (of Young-Holt Unlimited).
