= City of Angels (The Miracles album) =

Studio album by The Miracles
- Released: September 17, 1975
- Recorded: 1975
- Studio: Crystal Sound Recorders (Los Angeles, California)
- Genres: Soul, progressive soul, disco
- Length: 51:47
- Label: Tamla
- Producers: Freddie Perren, Pete Moore

The Miracles chronology
Don't Cha Love It (1975)	City of Angels (1975)	The Power of Music (1976)

Singles from City of Angels
- 1. "Love Machine (Pt. 1)" Released: September 19, 1975; 2. "Night Life" Released: April 15, 1976

Professional ratings
Review scores
Source	Rating
AllMusic	4/5 stars
Christgau's Record Guide	B

City of Angels is an album by the Motown soul group The Miracles, released on Motown Records' Tamla label in September 1975. The group's fourth album recorded after replacing lead singer Smokey Robinson with Billy Griffin in 1972, City of Angels is a concept album, depicting of a man from "Anytown, U.S.A." who follows his estranged girlfriend Charlotte to Los Angeles, where she has gone in hopes of becoming a star. All of the tracks on the album were written by Billy Griffin and Miracles bass singer Pete Moore. Freddie Perren and Moore served as the album's producers.

The album's first single, "Love Machine", peaked at number-one on the Billboard Hot 100 on March 6, 1976, and was a multi-million-selling platinum single, becoming the most successful single of The Miracles' career. Its success coincided with the rise of the disco craze of the late 1970s. Another song on City of Angels, "Ain't Nobody Straight in L.A.", caused controversy due to addressing the subject of homosexuality: "Ain't nobody straight in L.A./It seems that everybody is gay."

City of Angels reached 33 on the Billboard 200 albums chart in the United States, and peaked at number 29 on the Billboard Black Albums chart. The Miracles' City Of Angels was also a Platinum album with over one million records sold.

The song "Overture" from that album, co-written by Moore and Billy Griffin, was used as the official theme on Radio Monte Carlo in France from 1978 to 1979. While not available on CD in the U.S. until more recently, City of Angels was available in its entirety on the Motown import release, The Miracles – The Essential Collection.

In 2010, Motown released City Of Angels on CD in the U.S. for the first time – on Hip-O Select's "Motown Select" website, with the extended 12" version of "Love Machine" as a bonus track. Along with a never-before released essay by writer David Nathan, it included commentary by Miracles members Pete Moore and Billy Griffin, the album's composers.

== Walk of Fame star: Life Imitates Art ==
The album's cover depicted The Miracles' "star" on the Hollywood Walk Of Fame, although the group actually did not have such a star back in 1976. However, life eventually did imitate art, as The Miracles were honored with just such a star in Hollywood on March 20, 2009.

== Legacy ==
Rapper/producer Danny! reinterpreted the plot of "Poor Charlotte" for his 2006 album Charm.

== Track listing ==
All songs written by William Griffin and Warren "Pete" Moore.

Side one

1. "Overture" – 3:10
2. "City of Angels" – 4:50
3. "Free Press" – 3:15
4. "Ain't Nobody Straight In L.A." – 3:48
5. "Night Life" – 4:27

Side two

1. "Love Machine" – 6:52
2. "My Name is Michael" – 3:00
3. "Poor Charlotte" – 6:05
4. "Waldo Roderick DeHammersmith" – 3:06
5. "Smog" – 5:16

== Personnel ==
=== The Miracles ===
- Billy Griffin – lead vocals, guitar, co-composer
- Bobby Rogers – backing vocals
- Pete Moore – backing vocals, producer, co-composer
- Ronnie White – backing vocals

=== Additional ===
- Freddie Perren – producer, synthesizer (ARP & string ensemble), vibraphone
- Donald Griffin – guitar
- Greg Poree – guitar
- Jay Graydon – guitar
- John Barnes – keyboards, synthesizer
- Ed Greene – drums
- James Gadson – drums
- Scott Edwards – bass
- Eddie "Bongo" Brown – congas, bongos
- Paulinho da Costa – percussion
- Victor Feldman – vibraphone
- Carolyn Willis – vocals
- Julia Tillman – vocals

== Charts ==
=== Weekly charts ===
Year	Album	Chart positions		
Year	Album	US	US R&B	AUS
1975	City Of Angels	33 (1976)	29	81
