= My Girl Has Gone =

- Dutch picture sleeve

Single by the Miracles

from the album Going to a Go-Go
- B-side: "Since You Won My Heart"
- Released: September 22, 1965
- Recorded: August 10, 1965
- Studio: Hitsville USA, Detroit
- Genre: Soul/pop
- Length: 2:54
- Label: Tamla; T 54123
- Songwriters: Smokey Robinson; Ronald White; Warren Moore; Marvin Tarplin
- Producer: Smokey Robinson

The Miracles singles chronology
"The Tracks Of My Tears" (1965)	"My Girl Has Gone" (1965)	"Going to a Go-Go" (1965)

"My Girl Has Gone" is a 1965 R&B single recorded by the Miracles for Motown's Tamla label. Included on their 1965 album Going to a Go-Go, "My Girl Has Gone" was the follow-up to the group's number 16 Billboard Hot 100 million-selling hit "The Tracks of My Tears".

Written by Miracles members Smokey Robinson, Ronnie White, Pete Moore, and Marv Tarplin, the single was a Top 20 Pop hit, peaking at number 14 on the Billboard Hot 100 in the United States, and was also a Top 5 R&B hit, peaking at number three on Billboard's R&B singles chart. According to Robinson, Moore, and Bobby Rogers, the inspiration behind "My Girl Has Gone" was the guitar riffs of Miracles member Marv Tarplin, who also inspired "The Tracks of My Tears". Marv employed a 12 string guitar on the song, accompanied by the other Miracles' gospel-inspired harmonies, arranged by Miracle Pete Moore (who was, for years, the group's uncredited vocal arranger). As with many Miracles songs, the lyrics of "My Girl Has Gone" describe the end of the narrator's relationship with his lover:

My girl has gone, and said goodbye
Don't you cry, hold your head up high
Don't give up, give love one more try,
'Cause there's a right girl for every guy.

Cash Box described it as a "plaintive, slow moving rhythmic lament which sez that broken romances aren’t so serious ’cause there’s plenty of fish in the sea."

"My Girl Has Gone" has been covered by artists such as Etienne Daho, Edwyn Collins, Ken Parker, and Motown labelmate Bobby Taylor. The Miracles can be seen performing "My Girl Has Gone" on the Motown DVD release, Smokey Robinson & The Miracles: The Definitive Performances 1963–1987.

== Personnel Credits ==
=== Personnel-The Miracles ===
- Smokey Robinson-lead vocals, co-writer, producer
- Claudette Rogers Robinson-background vocals
- Pete Moore-background vocals, co-writer, vocal arrangements
- Ronnie White-background vocals, co-writer
- Bobby Rogers-background vocals
- Marv Tarplin-guitar, co-writer

=== Other Personnel ===
- Other instrumentation by The Funk Brothers

== Footnotes ==
My Girl Has Gone by The Miracles on YouTube
