= The Tracks of My Tears =

1965 single by the Miracles

Single by the Miracles

from the album Going to a Go-Go
- B-side: "A Fork in the Road"
- Released: June 23, 1965
- Recorded: May 19, 1965
- Studio: Hitsville USA, Detroit
- Genre: Soul; R&B; pop
- Length: 2:55
- Label: Tamla; T 54118
- Songwriters: William "Smokey" Robinson Jr.; Warren Moore; Marvin Tarplin
- Producer: Smokey Robinson

The Miracles singles chronology
"Ooo Baby Baby" (1965)	"The Tracks of My Tears" (1965)	"My Girl Has Gone" (1965)

"The Tracks of My Tears" is a 1965 song originally recorded by the Miracles on Motown Record's Tamla subsidiary label. It was composed by Miracles members Smokey Robinson, Pete Moore, and Marv Tarplin. This million-selling, multiple award-winning song has been inducted into the Grammy Hall of Fame, has been ranked by the Recording Industry Association of America and The National Endowment for the Arts at No. 127 in its list of the "Songs of the Century" – the 365 Greatest Songs of the 20th Century, and has been selected by Rolling Stone as No. 50 on its list of "The 500 Greatest Songs of All Time". In 2021, Rolling Stone ranked the Miracles' original recording of "The Tracks of My Tears" as "The Greatest Motown Song of All Time".

== The Miracles original version ==
=== Background ===
"The Tracks of My Tears" was written by Miracles members Smokey Robinson (lead vocalist), Pete Moore (bass vocalist), and Marv Tarplin (guitarist).

In the five-LP publication The Motown Story, by Motown Records, Robinson explained the origin of this song in these words: "'Tracks of My Tears' was actually started by Marv Tarplin, who is a young cat who plays guitar for our act. So he had this musical thing [sings melody], you know, and we worked around with it, and worked around, and it became 'Tracks of My Tears'." Tarplin's guitar licks at the song's intro are among the most famous in pop music history.

"The Tracks of My Tears" was a No. 2 hit on the Billboard R&B chart, and it reached No. 16 on the Billboard Hot 100. On initial release in the UK in 1965 it did not chart, but like several other Motown singles reissued there in 1969, it became a Top Ten hit in the summer, reaching No. 9, credited to "Smokey Robinson and the Miracles". This song is considered to be among the finest recordings of the Miracles, and it sold over one million records within two years, making it the Miracles' fourth million-selling record. Billboard described the song as a "first rate teen ballad with pulsating dance beat." Cash Box described it as "a slow-shufflin' pop-r&b tearjerker about a gal who has several regrets about losing her guy."

The Miracles can be seen performing "The Tracks of My Tears" on their 2006 Motown DVD release The Miracles' Definitive Performances.

=== Awards and accolades ===
"The Tracks of My Tears" is the Miracles' most honored and most covered song. It has been ranked at, or near the top of many "best of" lists in the music industry over the last 50 years, and has won numerous industry awards and accolades. The Miracles' original recording of "The Tracks of My Tears" ranked at No. 50 on Rolling Stone's The 500 Greatest Songs of All Time in 2004; the track was also a 2007 inductee into the Grammy Hall of Fame. On May 14, 2008, the track was preserved by the United States Library of Congress as an "culturally, historically, and aesthetically significance" to the National Recording Registry. The song "The Tracks of My Tears" was also awarded "The Award of Merit" from The American Society of Composers, Authors, and Publishers (ASCAP) for Miracles members/composers Pete Moore, Marv Tarplin, and Smokey Robinson.

Ranked by the RIAA and the National Endowment for the Arts at No. 127 in its list of the Songs of the Century - the 365 Greatest Songs of the 20th Century - "The Tracks of My Tears" was also chosen as one of The Rock and Roll Hall of Fame's 500 Songs that Shaped Rock and Roll. Additionally, the song ranked at No. 5 on the "Top 10 Best Songs of All Time" by a panel of 20 top industry songwriters and producers including Hal David, Paul McCartney, Brian Wilson, Jerry Leiber, and others as reported to Britain's Mojo music magazine. In 2021, Rolling Stone ranked the Miracles' original recording of "The Tracks of My Tears" as "The Greatest Motown Song of All Time."

=== The Miracles ===
- Smokey Robinson – lead vocals, co-writer
- Marv Tarplin – guitar, co-writer
- Claudette Rogers Robinson – background vocals
- Pete Moore – background vocals, vocal arranger, co-writer
- Ronnie White – background vocals
- Bobby Rogers – background vocals
- Other instrumentation by the Funk Brothers and the Detroit Symphony Orchestra

=== Charts ===
==== Weekly charts ====
Weekly chart performance for "The Tracks of My Tears"
Chart (1965)	Peak position
Canada RPM Top 40	5
UK	9
US Billboard Hot 100	16
US Billboard R&B	2
US Cash Box Top 100	18

==== Year-end charts ====
Year-end chart performance for "The Tracks of My Tears"
Chart (1965)	Rank
US Billboard Hot 100	78

== Certifications ==
Certifications for "The Tracks of My Tears"
Region	Certification	Certified units/sales
United Kingdom (BPI)	Silver	200,000^{‡}
^{‡} Sales+streaming figures based on certification alone.

== Linda Ronstadt version ==
"Tracks of My Tears"

Single by Linda Ronstadt

from the album Prisoner in Disguise
- B-side: "The Sweetest Gift"
- Released: December 1975
- Recorded: 1975
- Studio: The Sound Factory, Los Angeles
- Genre: Rock, country rock
- Length: 3:12
- Label: Asylum
- Songwriters: William "Smokey" Robinson Jr.; Warren Moore; Marvin Tarplin
- Producer: Peter Asher

Linda Ronstadt singles chronology
"Heat Wave" (1975)	"Tracks of My Tears" (1975)	"That'll Be the Day" (1976)

=== Background ===
In 1975, Linda Ronstadt recorded a cover version of "The Tracks of My Tears" for her studio album Prisoner in Disguise that became a pop Top 40 hit in the US. The single was produced by Peter Asher and issued on Asylum Records as that album's second single. Ronstadt's version of the song was a success peaking at No. 25 on the Billboard Hot 100 chart, reaching No. 11 on the Billboard C&W chart in tandem with its B-side: the Emmylou Harris duet "The Sweetest Gift", and No. 42 in 1976 on the UK Singles Chart.

Ronstadt later scored another of her biggest hits with her 1978 single "Ooh Baby Baby", which was a remake of the Miracles' hit single preceding "The Tracks of My Tears". Ronstadt and Smokey Robinson performed both "The Tracks of My Tears" and "Ooh Baby Baby" on the Motown 25: Yesterday, Today, Forever special broadcast on May 16, 1983.

=== Chart performance ===
==== Weekly charts ====
Chart (1975–76)	Peak position
Canada RPM Top Singles	22
Canada RPM Adult Contemporary	2
UK	42
US Billboard Hot 100	25
US Billboard Adult Contemporary	4
US Billboard Country	11
US Cash Box Top 100	25
US Record World	38

==== Year-end charts ====
Chart (1976)	Rank
Canada RPM Top Singles	166
US (Joel Whitburn's Pop Annual)	154
US Billboard Adult Contemporary	42

== Other versions ==
- In 1967, "The Tracks of My Tears" was covered by Johnny Rivers. His version of the song reached No. 10 on the Billboard Hot 100 chart, and No. 8 in Canada.
- Aretha Franklin recorded the song for her Soul '69 album from which it was issued as a single although as the B-side. Franklin's version of "The Weight" became the favored track with "Tracks of My Tears" peaking at No. 76 Pop and No. 21 R&B.
- Shirley covered the song in 1977, reaching No. 20 in Australia.
- A 1982 version by Colin Blunstone reached No. 60 in the UK Singles Chart.
- English pop duo Go West covered the song as "Tracks of My Tears" and released it as a single on September 20, 1993. Their version reached No. 16 on the UK Singles Chart, No. 38 on the Icelandic Singles Chart, and No. 82 on the Canadian RPM 100 Hit Tracks chart.

== Bibliography ==
- Coryton, Demitri; Joseph Murrells. Hits of the Sixties: The Million Sellers. p. 131.
