= The Definitive Performances (1963–1987) =

Video by Smokey Robinson & the Miracles
- Released: November 21, 2006
- Recorded: 1963–1987
- Genre: Soul, Motown
- Length: 150 mins
- Label: Motown
- Producer: David Peck & Phillip Galloway (Reelin' In The Years Productions); Ian Brenchley & Archie Gormley (Universal Music Group International)

Smokey Robinson & the Miracles chronology
20th Century Masters: DVD Collection (2005)	The Definitive Performances (1963–1987) (2006)

The Definitive Performances (1963–1987) is an anthology of performances by Smokey Robinson & the Miracles. It was produced by Reelin' in the Years Productions and the Universal Music Group International, in conjunction with Motown. In addition to the musical performances, this DVD features an interview with original Miracles members Smokey Robinson, Bobby Rogers, and Pete Moore. Original members Marv Tarplin and Claudette Robinson are not present, but are mentioned throughout the disc. Original member Ronnie White died in 1995. The disc also features two hit songs by the group featuring Smokey Robinson's replacement, Billy Griffin, and three of Smokey's solo hits. During the interview, the three Miracles discuss the history of the group, the formation of Motown, and detailed stories behind the creation of some of their greatest hits. According to David Peck, producer of the disc for Reelin' In The Years, The Miracles' "Definitive DVD" has been awarded Certified Gold status by the RIAA .

== Track listing ==
1. "Shop Around" (from Teen Town – February 1965)
2. "You've Really Got a Hold on Me/ Bring It On Home To Me" (from Motortown Revue at The Apollo – April 1963)
3. "Mickey's Monkey (song)" (from Hollywood A Go-Go - November 20, 1965)
4. "Ooo Baby Baby" (from Murray The K - It's What's Happening, Baby - June 28, 1965)
5. "The Tracks of My Tears" (from Swingin' Time - December 8, 1965)
6. "Going to a Go-Go" (from Swingin' Time – December 8, 1965)
7. "My Girl Has Gone" (from Swingin' Time – December 8, 1965)
8. "I Second That Emotion" (from The Mike Douglas Show – February 29, 1968)
9. "The Tears of a Clown" (from The Don Knotts Show – October 20, 1970)
10. "Do It Baby" (from Dinah! – March 11, 1976)
11. "Love Machine" (from Dinah! – March 11, 1976)
12. "Crusin'" (from Going Platinum – 1980)
13. "Being With You" (from the Don Lane Show – October 19, 1981)
14. "Just to See Her" (from Power Hits – 1987)

Note : the foreign release of this DVD includes an extra track not included in the U.S. release: "Yesterday" from The Ed Sullivan Show-1968. Miracles member Marv Tarplin is featured prominently in this performance. All tracks have been remastered for this release.

== Personnel ==
- Smokey Robinson
- Bobby Rogers
- Claudette Rogers Robinson
- Ronald White
- Pete Moore
- Billy Griffin
- Marv Tarplin
