= Ooo Baby Baby =

1965 song by the Miracles

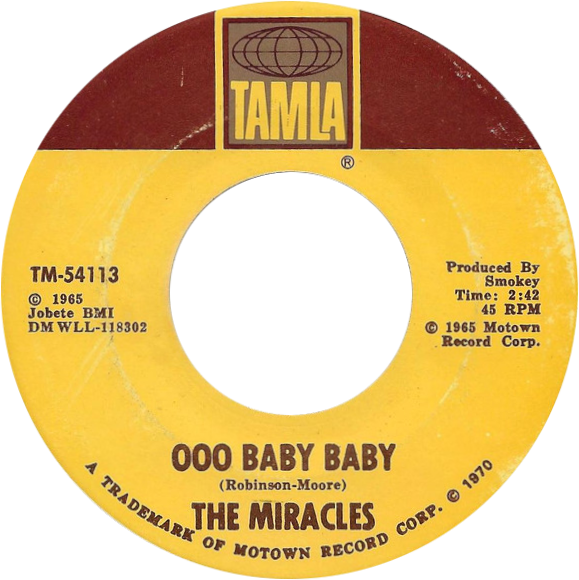
- Side A of the 1970s US reissue

Single by the Miracles

from the album Going to a Go-Go
- B-side: "All That's Good"
- Released: March 5, 1965
- Recorded: February 1, 1965
- Studio: Hitsville USA, Detroit
- Genre: R&B; pop; soul
- Length: 2:48
- Label: Tamla
- Songwriters: Smokey Robinson; Pete Moore
- Producer: Smokey Robinson

The Miracles singles chronology
| "Come On Do the Jerk" (1964) | "Ooo Baby Baby" (1965) | "The Tracks of My Tears" (1965) |

Official audio
- "Ooo Baby Baby" on YouTube

"Ooo Baby Baby" is a song written by Smokey Robinson and Pete Moore. It was a 1965 hit single by the Miracles for the Tamla (Motown) label.

The song has inspired numerous cover versions by other artists over the years, including covers by Ella Fitzgerald, Todd Rundgren, the Escorts, the Five Stairsteps, Linda Ronstadt, and many others. The Miracles' original version of "Ooo Baby Baby" was listed as number 266 on Rolling Stone Magazine's 2010 list of "The 500 Greatest Songs of All Time".

== The Miracles original version ==
=== Background ===
Written by Robinson and fellow Miracle Pete Moore and produced by Robinson, "Ooo Baby Baby" was a number 4 hit on the Billboard R&B singles chart and reached number 16 on the Billboard Hot 100.

A slow, remorseful number, "Ooo Baby Baby" features Miracles lead singer Smokey Robinson lamenting the fact that he cheated on his female lover, and begging for her to overlook his mistakes and please forgive him. The song's highly emotional feel is supported by the Miracles' tight background vocal harmonies, arranged by Miracles member and song co-author Pete Moore, and a lush orchestral string arrangement that accents the Funk Brothers band's instrumental track.

Cash Box described it as "a medium-paced, low-down, pop-r&b ode about an unfortunate gal whose singin' the blues since she lost her guy."

In 2010 Rolling Stone ranked the Miracles' original version of this song as number 266 on their list of the 500 Greatest Songs of All Time. The song is one of the Miracles' most-covered tunes.

On the 2006 Motown DVD The Miracles' Definitive Performances, Pete comments on the song's creation: "In the songs that Smokey and I wrote together, Smokey and Berry kinda left the background vocals to me. And this song 'I'm on the Outside (Looking In)', which was one of the Imperials' bigger hits.... When I heard that song, as far as the background [harmonies] were concerned and how [they were structured], I wanted to get the same kind of feeling with Smokey's vocal. So I called Bobby, Ronnie, and Claudette over, and we did the backgrounds for it. I kinda had that particular song in mind... so I wanted to get the same kind of feeling with 'Ooo Baby Baby'."

=== Charts ===
==== Weekly charts ====
| Chart (1965) | Peak position |
|---|---|
| Canada RPM Top Singles | 17 |
| US Billboard Hot 100 | 16 |
| US R&B (Billboard) | 4 |
| US Cash Box Top 100 | 18 |

==== Year-end charts ====
| Chart (1965) | Rank |
|---|---|
| US Billboard Hot 100 | 93 |

== Personnel ==
=== The Miracles ===
- William "Smokey" Robinson – writer, producer, lead vocals
- Warren "Pete" Moore – writer, vocal arrangements, background vocals
- Claudette Rogers Robinson – background vocals
- Ronnie White – background vocals
- Bobby Rogers – background vocals
- Marv Tarplin – guitar

=== Other credits ===
- Detroit Symphony Orchestra – strings
- The Funk Brothers – other instruments, featuring Jack Ashford on vibraphone

== Linda Ronstadt version ==
"Ooh Baby Baby"

Single by Linda Ronstadt

from the album Living in the USA
- B-side: "Blowing Away"
- Released: October 24, 1978
- Studio: The Sound Factory (Los Angeles, CA)
- Genre: Rhythm and blues, soul
- Length: 3:18
- Label: Asylum
- Songwriters: Smokey Robinson; Pete Moore
- Producer: Peter Asher

Linda Ronstadt singles chronology
| "Back in the U.S.A." (1978) | "Ooh Baby Baby" (1978) | "Just One Look" (1979) |

=== Background ===
In 1978, Linda Ronstadt recorded a cover spelled as "Ooh Baby Baby" and included it on her double-Platinum album Living in the USA. Her version of the single reached number 2 on the Contemporary chart and peaked at number 7 on the Billboard Hot 100 in 1979 (it also hit the R&B and Country singles charts). Her single, which opens with a saxophone solo by David Sanborn, was produced by Peter Asher and issued on Asylum Records. Ronstadt performed with Smokey Robinson both "The Tracks of My Tears" and "Ooh Baby Baby" on the Motown 25: Yesterday, Today, Forever special broadcast on May 16, 1983.

=== Charts ===
==== Weekly charts ====
| Chart (1978–1979) | Peak position |
|---|---|
| Canada RPM Top Singles | 6 |
| Canada Adult Contemporary (RPM) | 26 |
| France | 10 |
| US Billboard Hot 100 | 7 |
| US Adult Contemporary (Billboard) | 2 |
| US Hot Country Songs (Billboard) | 85 |
| US Hot R&B/Hip-Hop Songs (Billboard) | 77 |
| US Cash Box Top 100 | 7 |

==== Year-end charts ====
| Chart (1978) | Rank |
|---|---|
| Canada RPM Top Singles | 166 |

| Chart (1979) | Rank |
|---|---|
| Canada RPM Top Singles | 69 |
| US Billboard Hot 100 | 77 |
| US Cash Box Top 100 | 59 |
