= Love Machine (The Miracles song) =

"Love Machine (Part 1)"

Single by The Miracles

from the album City of Angels
- B-side: "Love Machine (Part 2)"
- Released: October 1975
- Recorded: 1975
- Genre: Disco
- Length: 2:55 (single version); 6:52 (album version)
- Label: Tamla
- Songwriters: William Griffin; Warren Moore
- Producer: Freddie Perren

The Miracles singles chronology
"Gemini" (1975)	"Love Machine (Part 1)" (1975)	"Night Life" (1976)

"Love Machine" is a 1975 single recorded by Motown group the Miracles, taken from their album City of Angels. It was a number-one hit on the Billboard Hot 100, and the biggest-selling hit single of the Miracles' career. The song was one of two Billboard Hot 100 top-20 hits recorded by The Miracles with Billy Griffin as lead vocalist; the other is 1973's "Do It Baby". Griffin had replaced Miracles founder Smokey Robinson as lead singer in 1972. "Love Machine" features a growling vocal by Miracle Bobby Rogers, with group baritone Ronnie White repeating "yeah, baby" throughout the song.

== Background ==
The song was initially written in 1974 for a seven-member girl group of the same name that had been signed to Motown. However, Motown dropped the group before any record could be released, and The Miracles decided to keep the song for themselves. Engineered and mixed by Kevin Beamish, "Love Machine" was produced by Freddie Perren, a former member of The Corporation brain trust in charge of the early Jackson 5 hits. It was written by Billy Griffin and his Miracles group-mate, original Miracle Pete Moore, with whom he wrote the rest of the City of Angels tracks as well. The song's lyrics, delivered over a disco beat, compare a lover to an electronic device such as a computer or a robot. The seven-minute song was split into two parts for its release as a single, with "Part 1" receiving most notoriety.

"Love Machine" was the only two-part single of the Miracles' career. It was a multi-million selling Platinum single, a number-one smash hit on the U.S. Billboard Hot 100 during the week of March 6, 1976, and the best-selling single of the Miracles' career as it sold over 4.5 million copies. The single went to number 5 on the Hot Soul Singles chart, and went to number 20 on Record World's National Disco file Top 20 chart. "Love Machine" was also a Top 10 hit in the UK, peaking at number three on the UK Singles Chart. The group re-recorded the song in 1989 for Ian Levine's Motorcity reunion.

== Personnel ==
- Lead vocals by Billy Griffin
- Background vocals by Bobby Rogers, Ronnie White, and Pete Moore
- Growling by Bobby Rogers
- "Yeah, baby" vocals by Ronnie White
- Instrumentation by various Los Angeles studio musicians

== Charts ==
Weekly chart performance for "Love Machine"
Chart (1975–1976)	Peak position
Australia (Kent Music Report)	89
UK Singles Chart	3
US Billboard Hot 100	1
US Hot Black Singles (Billboard)	5
US Record World National Disco File	20

"Love Machine", to which Griffin and co-writer Miracle Pete Moore retained publishing rights through their publishing company Grimora Music (instead of Motown's music publishing company, Jobete), is the most-used song in Motown history and has generated more than $15 million in revenues.

== Use in media ==
The term "love machine" was popularized in 1969 by Jacqueline Susann's best-selling novel of the same title.

The Miracles' "Love Machine" has since been used in many different commercials, motion pictures and television shows, including:

- Cheech Marin plays the song while driving down the road in the 1978 Cheech & Chong film, Up in Smoke; his vehicle is named "Love Machine".
- Jesse Katsopolis (John Stamos) and his friends sang the song in "The Seven-Month Itch (Part 2)", a 1988 season one episode of the ABC TV series Full House.
- The first 30 seconds of the song was featured in a couple of Denny's restaurant television commercials in the 1980s, depicting a mother hen and her chicks dancing to this tune for their Grand Slam Breakfasts.
- The 1995 Disney film Heavyweights.
- The 1997 crime film Donnie Brasco.
- The 1998 disco film 54.
- The 1998 erotic thriller film Wild Things, where Sandra Van Ryan (Theresa Russell) is having an affair with the pool boy Frankie Condo (Eduardo Yáñez) before being interrupted by a phone call.
- The 2000 film Coyote Ugly, the scene of the wedding of Violet Sanford (Piper Perabo)'s friend Gloria (Melanie Lynskey).
- The 2002 film The New Guy.
- Around 2004, the hotel chain Travelodge started to use the song with the brand's mascot bear dancing.
- The movie trailer for the 2000 animated film Chicken Run.
- The TV spot for the 2001 Pixar film Monsters, Inc.
- A new version of the song also appears in the 2013 Disney film, Planes, where the Mexican airplane El Chupacabra (Carlos Alazraqui) attempts to impress the Canadian Rochelle (Julia Louis-Dreyfus) with it. His use of the original version fails, but when he changes it to a slow serenade, it works.
- The 1999 season two episode of Ally McBeal, "Love's Illusions".
- The 2001 season three episode of Futurama, "I Dated a Robot".
- The 2002 season three episode of My Wife and Kids, "Jr.'s Dating Dilemma".
- "Love Machine" was the name of a sentient computer virus in the 2009 film Summer Wars.
- The chorus of the song was used in the 2000 season 6 Friends episode "The One Where Paul's the Man".

== See also ==
- List of Billboard Hot 100 number-one singles of 1976
