= The Miracles =

American R&B and soul vocal group

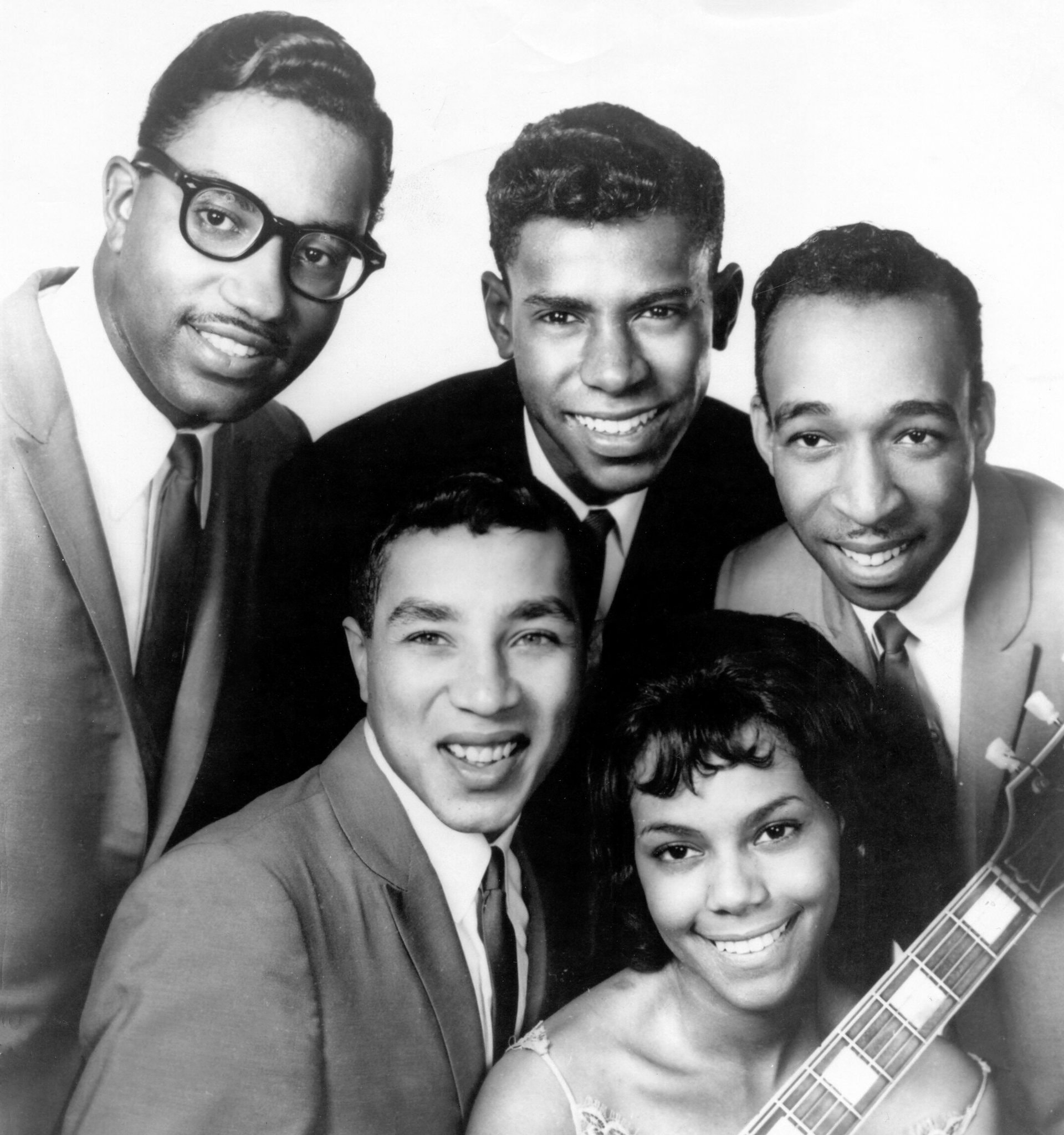
- The Miracles in 1962. Clockwise from top left: Bobby Rogers, Marv Tarplin, Ronnie White, Claudette Robinson, and Smokey Robinson. Not pictured: Pete Moore.

Background information
- Also known as: The Five Chimes (1955); The Matadors (1955–1957); Smokey Robinson & The Miracles (1965–1972); The New Miracles (1980–1983)
- Origin: Detroit, Michigan, U.S.
- Genres: R&B; doo-wop; rock and roll; soul; funk; disco
- Years active: 1955–1983; 1993–2011
- Labels: End; Chess; Tamla; Columbia
- Past members: Ronnie White; Warren "Pete" Moore; Smokey Robinson; Clarence Dawson; James Grice; Emerson "Sonny" Rogers; Bobby Rogers; Claudette Rogers Robinson; Marv Tarplin; Billy Griffin; Donald "Don" Griffin; Carl Cotton; David "Dave" Finley; Sidney Justin; Tee Turner; Mark Scott

The Miracles (known as Smokey Robinson and the Miracles from 1965 to 1972) were an American vocal group formed in Detroit, Michigan, in 1955. They were the first successful recording act for Motown Records and are considered one of the most important and most influential groups in the history of pop, soul, rhythm and blues, and rock and roll music. The group's international fame in the 1960s, alongside other Motown acts, led to a greater acceptance of R&B and pop music in the U.S., with the group being considered influential and important in the development of modern popular music.

The group was formed as The Five Chimes and changed their name first to the Matadors, and then after adding Claudette, to the Miracles in 1958, by which time their lineup consisted of Smokey Robinson, Claudette Rogers (later Robinson), Bobby Rogers, Warren "Pete" Moore, Marv Tarplin, and Ronnie White. Referred to as Motown's "soul supergroup", the Miracles recorded more than 50 chart hits, including 26 Top 40 pop hits, 16 of which reached the Billboard Hot 100 Top 20, seven Top 10 singles, and a number-one single (1967's "The Tears of a Clown") while the Robinsons and Tarplin were members. Following the departure of Tarplin and the Robinsons, the rest of the group continued with singer Billy Griffin and manager Martin Pichinson, who helped rebuild the Miracles. They scored two final Top 20 singles, "Do It Baby" (1974) and "Love Machine" (1975), a second No. 1 hit, which topped the charts before the group departed for Columbia Records in 1977. Recording as a quintet at Columbia Records, Billy's brother Donald Griffin replacing Marv Tarplin, after a few releases, they disbanded in 1978. The group has won numerous music industry awards, including four songs inducted into the Grammy Hall of Fame, several BMI and ASCAP Songwriters' Awards, and induction into the Rock and Roll Hall of Fame.

On the R&B charts, the Miracles scored 26 Top 10 Billboard R&B hits, with four R&B No. 1's, and 11 U.S. R&B Top 10 Albums, including two No. 1's. Bobby Rogers and Ronald White revived the group as a touring ensemble sporadically during the 1980s and again in the 1990s. Following White's death in 1995, Rogers continued to tour with different members until he was forced into retirement due to health issues in 2011, dying less than two years later. In 1987, Smokey Robinson was inducted into the Rock and Roll Hall of Fame as a solo artist, and much controversy ensued over the Miracles' omission from the Hall. The Miracles were finally inducted into the Hall of Fame by lead singer Robinson in 2012.

== History ==
=== Initial career and success ===
The group that later became the Miracles was formed in 1955 by five teenage friends from Detroit, Michigan, under the name the Five Chimes. Three of the founding members, Smokey Robinson, Warren "Pete" Moore, and Ronnie White, had been singing together since they each were around the age of eleven. The group, influenced by acts such as Billy Ward and His Dominoes and Nolan Strong & the Diablos, featured Clarence Dawson and James Grice in the original lineup. All of the group's original members attended Northern High School in Detroit. After Dawson quit the group and Grice dropped out to get married, they were replaced by Emerson "Sonny" Rogers and his cousin Bobby and changed their name to the Matadors. Coincidentally, both Smokey Robinson and Bobby Rogers were born in the same hospital on the same date (February 19, 1940), despite not actually meeting each other until they were fifteen. In 1957, Sonny Rogers left to join the United States Army and Claudette Rogers, his sister, who had been singing with the sister group the Matadorettes, joined them shortly afterwards, and in 1958, the group became the Miracles. Following two years of courtship, Smokey and Claudette married in November 1959.

The group's extensive work with Berry Gordy and Tamla Records gave the parent label Motown Record Corporation its first million-selling hit record with the 1960 Grammy Hall of Fame smash, "Shop Around", and further established themselves as one of Motown's top acts with the hit singles "You've Really Got a Hold on Me", "What's So Good About Goodbye", "Way Over There", "I'll Try Something New", "Mickey's Monkey", "Going to a Go-Go", "(Come 'Round Here) I'm the One You Need", "The Love I Saw in You Was Just a Mirage", "If You Can Want", "More Love", "I Don't Blame You at All", "Ooo Baby Baby", the multi-award-winning "The Tracks of My Tears", "My Girl Has Gone", "Special Occasion", "I Second That Emotion", "Baby Baby Don't Cry", the number-one Pop smashes "The Tears of a Clown" and "Love Machine", "Do It Baby", and "That's What Love Is Made Of", among numerous other hits.

The group auditioned for Brunswick Records in front of Alonzo Tucker (an original member of the Midnighters who had since left the group to join Jackie Wilson's management team), Nat Tarnopol (Jackie Wilson's manager) and one of the label's staff songwriters, Berry Gordy, who remained quiet during the audition. Tucker was unimpressed by the audition, stating that because there was the Platters that "there couldn't be two groups in America like that with a woman in the group." After the Tarnopol and Tucker rejection, Gordy followed them and soon agreed to work with the group after discovering Robinson's notebook full of songs he had written and having been impressed with Robinson's singing voice.

Gordy recorded their first single, "Got a Job", an answer song to the Silhouettes' "Get a Job" in January 1958. Gordy shortly thereafter struck a deal with George Goldner's End Records to distribute the single. Before the song was released, the group changed their name to the Miracles, taking it from the moniker "Miracletones", with the "'Tones" taken out. This first Miracles' single became a Top 10 National R&B Hit, peaking at No. 5, although it missed the Pop Hot 100. After earning only $3.19 for his production success, Gordy was told by Robinson to form his own label, which Gordy did, forming Tamla Records in 1959. One of the Miracles' first Tamla singles, the ballad "Bad Girl", became the Miracles' first song to chart on the Billboard Hot 100 Pop chart that October when it was licensed to and issued nationally by Chess Records. The next Miracles song, "It", was credited to "Ron & Bill", in a duet between White and Robinson, and was released on Tamla and nationally picked by Chess subsidiary Argo Records. Following a dismal reception at the Apollo Theater in 1959, Robinson recruited guitarist Marv Tarplin to join them on a few touring dates after Tarplin played with the Primettes (later the Supremes), with Tarplin officially joining the Miracles shortly afterwards. The addition of Tarplin was the final element in making the Miracles' "classic lineup" complete.

In 1960, the Miracles again reached the charts with "Way Over There", their second national Pop hit, which Robinson wrote and based on the Isley Brothers' "Shout". Later that year, the Miracles released "Shop Around", backed with "Who's Lovin' You", which became the group's first smash hit, reaching No. 1 on the R&B charts, No. 2 on the Billboard Hot 100, and No. 1 on the Cash Box Magazine "Top 100" Pop Chart, and was the first Motown single to sell a million copies. Both sides of this record became classics, and standards for R&B and rock musicians alike for several decades afterwards.

As a result of this success, the Miracles became the first Motown act to appear on Dick Clark's "American Bandstand" on December 27, 1960. The Miracles had modest success with their next few singles, including "Ain't It Baby", "Mighty Good Lovin'", "Brokenhearted" and "Everybody's Gotta Pay Some Dues", as 1961 continued. During this early period, the group suffered some problems as Robinson caught Asian Flu and had to be bedded for a month, leaving wife Claudette Robinson to lead the Miracles on tour until he recovered. Claudette herself had her share of problems, having suffered her first miscarriage that occurred after a car accident and Pete Moore was drafted to serve in the United States Army. The group's next charted successes included "What's So Good About Goodbye", and the string-laden "I'll Try Something New".

The Miracles have been awarded many top music industry honors over the years. In 1997, the group received the Pioneer Award at the Rhythm and Blues Foundation for their musical achievements. Four years later, in 2001, they were inducted to the Vocal Group Hall of Fame. In 2004, they were ranked No. 32 on the Rolling Stone magazine's list of The 100 Greatest Artists of All Time, retaining that same position seven years later, in 2011. Four of their hit songs were inducted into the Grammy Hall of Fame (The most of any Motown group). In 2009, the group received a star on the Hollywood Walk of Fame. Throughout their careers, the Miracles were also enshrined with honors for their songwriting by both BMI and ASCAP. In 2008, Billboard listed them at No. 61 on their 100 most successful Billboard artists ever list.

=== "The Showstoppers" ===
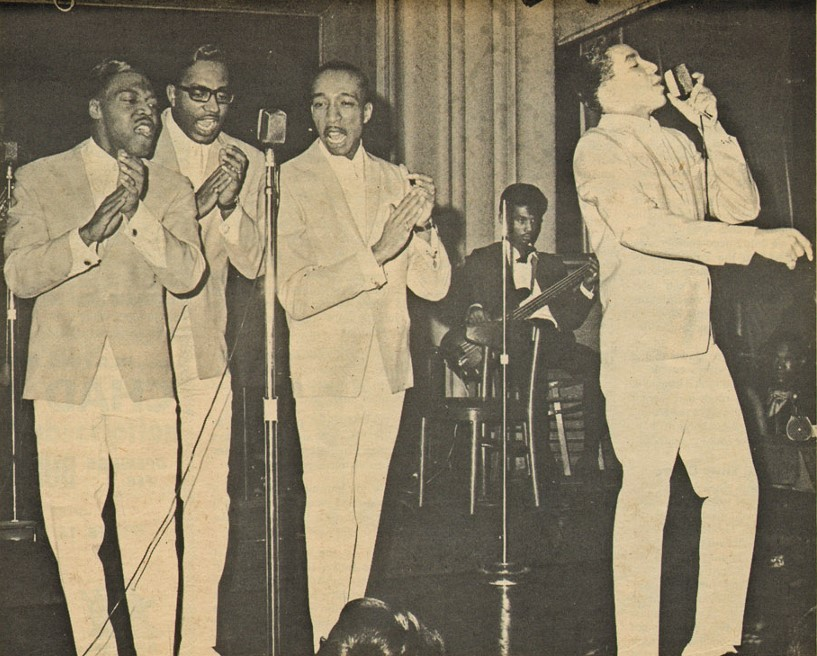
The Miracles pictured in the February 12, 1966 edition of KRLA Beat (L-to-R) Pete Moore, Bobby Rogers, Ronnie White, and Smokey Robinson

The group reached the Top 10 again with "You've Really Got a Hold on Me" (another Grammy Hall of Fame-inducted hit) in 1962, featuring lead vocals by Smokey Robinson and Bobby Rogers. (This song actually began life as the "B" side to the group's intended "A" side, "Happy Landing", but the nation's Dee Jays flipped the song over, because they liked "Hold on Me" better). The Miracles hit the Top 10 still a third time the following year with the exciting Holland-Dozier-Holland-written-and-produced song "Mickey's Monkey". The group's exciting live performances were so well received, they were often referred to as "The Showstoppers". The Miracles' success paved the way for all future Motown stars, and, as Motown's first group, they would serve as the prototype for all other Motown groups to follow. The Miracles had become a national sensation, and their success catapulted them to the position of Motown's top-selling act, making them headliners at the nationwide Motortown Revue package touring shows, which showcased Motown artists, and that started around late 1962.

The Miracles were also the first Motown act to receive coaching and instruction from famed choreographer Cholly Atkins, who had previously worked with Little Anthony & the Imperials, the Cadillacs, and future Motown act Gladys Knight & the Pips. (Bobby Rogers, the Miracles' best dancer, did choreography for the group prior to Atkins' arrival). Through his association with the Miracles, Atkins came into Motown at their insistence, and soon became the official in-house choreographer for all of the company's acts, including the Temptations, the Marvelettes, the Four Tops, the Contours, Martha & the Vandellas, and the Supremes.

=== Songwriting ===
In addition to penning their own material, Miracles Robinson, White, Rogers, Tarplin, and Moore wrote for many of their labelmates as well. Motown hits written, but not recorded, by members of the Miracles include songs for the Temptations ("The Way You Do The Things You Do", "My Girl", "Don't Look Back", "Since I Lost My Baby", "It's Growing", "Get Ready", "My Baby"), Mary Wells ("My Guy", "The One Who Really Loves You", "What Love Has Joined Together", "Two Lovers"), Marvin Gaye ("I'll Be Doggone", "Ain't That Peculiar", "One More Heartache"), the Marvelettes ("Don't Mess With Bill", "My Baby Must Be a Magician", "The Hunter Gets Captured by the Game"), The Contours ("First I Look at the Purse"), and Brenda Holloway ("When I'm Gone"). Unlike other Motown artists, whose songs were written for them by staff songwriters, the Miracles were one of the few Motown acts that composed their own songs, adding to the group's already impressive reputation.

Around 1964, Smokey Robinson became Motown's vice president, while the other members of the Miracles also began to work staff jobs with the company. Smokey and Claudette Robinson made plans to begin a family, but the rough life of touring caused Claudette to have several miscarriages. In early 1964, Claudette decided to retire from the road and remain at home in Detroit after another miscarriage, her sixth. From this point on, Claudette did not tour with the Miracles or appear in any official group photographs or on television, although she remained as a non-touring member of the Miracles, and continued to sing backup with the group in the studio until 1972.

After Claudette Robinson's departure, the remaining Miracles appeared on the T.A.M.I. Show, a landmark 1964 concert film released by American International Pictures that included performances by numerous popular rock and roll and R&B recording stars from the United States and England, filmed and recorded live at the Santa Monica Civic Auditorium on October 28 and 29, 1964. This film had theatrical release in theatres across the United States, and also included performances by fellow Motown artists the Supremes and Marvin Gaye, along with Chuck Berry, Lesley Gore, the Beach Boys, the Rolling Stones, and James Brown and the Famous Flames. The Miracles' performance was one of the show's highlights, called "athletically electrifying" by critics. Miracles chart hit singles that year included "That's What Love Is Made Of" and "I Like It Like That". In early 1965, the group released Motown Records' first double album, The Miracles Greatest Hits from the Beginning, which was a success on Billboard's Pop and R&B Album Charts. Also in 1965, the Miracles released their landmark Top 10 album, Going to a Go-Go, under the new group name of Smokey Robinson and the Miracles. This album launched four Top 20 singles into the Billboard Hot 100, including the landmark million-selling Grammy Hall of Fame single, "The Tracks of My Tears", "Ooo Baby Baby", "Going to a Go-Go" and "My Girl Has Gone", all of which became Top 10 R&B hit singles as well. During this period, their music had also made its way abroad, influencing several British groups along the way. The effects of this influence soon became even more pronounced when the Beatles, the Hollies, the Zombies, the Who, and the Rolling Stones all began recording covers of Miracles hits. Members of the Beatles, in particular, publicly stated that the music of the Miracles had greatly influenced their own.

Around this time, the group had begun performing in nightclubs and other high-profile venues after years on the Chitlin' Circuit. According to an Ebony article on the group, the group began grossing $150,000 a year due to royalties and personal investments. They also were making between $100,000 and $250,000 for nightly shows. In addition, the Miracles appeared on many of the popular variety television programs of the period, including The Ed Sullivan Show, Shindig!, Hullabaloo, American Bandstand, Where The Action Is, The Mike Douglas Show, The Andy Williams Show,Teen Town,Hollywood A Go-Go, Upbeat, and Britain's Ready Steady Go!. The Miracles' success continued with several hits including "(Come 'Round Here) I'm the One You Need", "More Love", "Special Occasion", "If You Can Want", and the Top 10 hit "I Second That Emotion". Around this time, the group was starting to be billed as Smokey Robinson and the Miracles on several of their albums. The name change did not appear on their singles until the release of "The Love I Saw in You Was Just a Mirage", a Top 20 hit released in 1967. On that song's flipside was the tune "Come Spy with Me". The Miracles sang the original theme to the 1967 20th Century Fox film of the same name.

The year 1968 brought a second "greatest hits" collection, The Miracles Greatest Hits, Vol. 2, which was the group's second Top 10 album, which featured the most popular singles from their successful Going to a Go-Go, Away We A Go-Go and Make It Happen albums of the 1965–67 period. Also in 1968, the group released their hit album Special Occasion which spawned three Top 40 singles, including the smash "If You Can Want", which the group performed on their first appearance on CBS' The Ed Sullivan Show, at the time considered television's top talent and entertainment showcase.

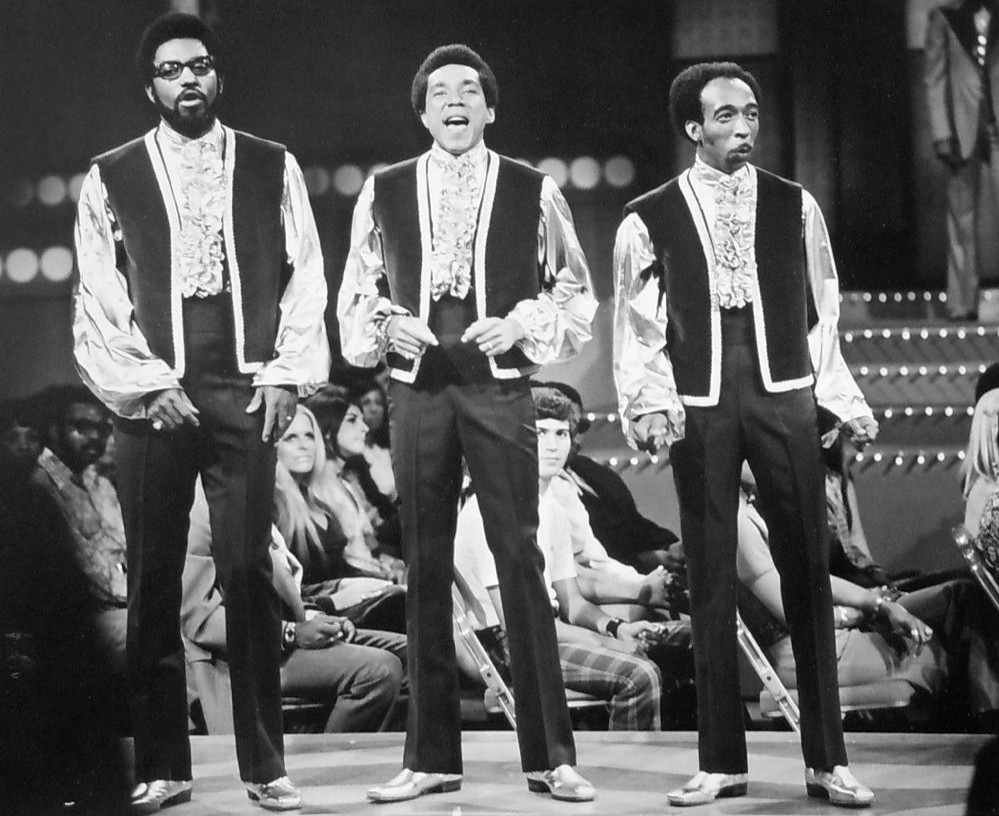
The Miracles performing on The Smokey Robinson Show, a 1970 ABC Television special. (L-to-R) Bobby Rogers, Smokey Robinson, Ronnie White.(Pete Moore was sidelined with a leg injury)

However, due to constant changes in the music industry and Motown, by 1969, Smokey Robinson sought to leave the Miracles and the stage, to settle for continued work as Motown's vice president as well as become more of a family man to his wife Claudette and their children. The year 1969 had brought a second Ed Sullivan Show appearance for the group, singing their then-current singles "Doggone Right", and their hit cover of Dion's "Abraham, Martin and John". Robinson's departure plans however, were thwarted after the group's 1969 song "Baby Baby Don't Cry" hit the Billboard Pop Top 10, and when the Miracles' 1967 song, "The Tears of a Clown",(their fourth Grammy Hall of Fame-inducted hit) was released as a single in 1970, it became a number-one hit in the UK. It was subsequently released in the U.S., where it duplicated its UK success, reaching No. 1 on the Billboard Hot 100 Pop Chart and selling over 3 million copies. As a result, the Miracles became hotter than ever, and Robinson decided to stay with the group for another two years. In 1970, the group were given their own ABC television special, The Smokey Robinson Show, which starred the Miracles, with guest stars the Supremes, the Temptations, Stevie Wonder, and Fran Jeffries. In 1971, they scored one more Top 20 hit with 1971's "I Don't Blame You at All". In 1972, Robinson made good on his promise to leave the Miracles, starting a six-month tour which ended in July 1972 at Washington, D.C., later introducing Billy Griffin as his official replacement. This series of final live Miracles concerts with Robinson was released by Motown on the double album Smokey Robinson & The Miracles: 1957–1972 (Tamla TS320). About that final tour, Miracle Pete Moore stated: "We had 12 farewell engagements playing to sold-out houses. It was amazing." Also released that year was the group's last studio album with Smokey, Flying High Together, with its lead single "We've Come Too Far to End It Now" reaching the Billboard R&B Top 10 (their 23rd visit to the Top 10 of that chart). After Smokey's retirement, Billy Griffin was introduced to national television audiences on NBC's The Midnight Special, on an episode guest-starring the Miracles and hosted by Smokey Robinson, broadcast on July 13, 1973. Within a year afterwards, Marv Tarplin also decided to leave the group and continued working with Robinson on his solo material, while Claudette, who had essentially retired from the Miracles' live performances in 1963, permanently left the Miracles when her husband Smokey did, retiring from recording with them as well.

=== Later career ===
In 1973, the Miracles, with Griffin, re-emerged with the critically acclaimed album, Renaissance – their first without Smokey Robinson on lead vocals, which included the Marvin Gaye composition, "I Love You Secretly", "What Is a Heart Good For" (the intended first single), and the charting single,"Don't Let It End (Til You Let It Begin)". The following year, in 1974, after releasing the much-covered single "Give Me Just Another Day", the group had their first Top 20 hit in three years with the million-selling funk song, "Do It Baby". This was followed by the Top 10 R&B hit, "Don't-Cha Love It". Late that following year, the group recorded the disco smash, "Love Machine", which came off their self-written-and-produced hit album, City of Angels. "Love Machine" reached number-one on the Hot 100 in early 1976, the Miracles' first since "Tears of a Clown", and later sold over 4.5 million copies. The Miracles, who had long been written off by the music industry, had proven that they could have big hits without Robinson. Despite this success, however, in 1976, the Miracles' relationship with Motown imploded during contract renewals after their contract with the label had expired. When Motown, then going through a contract issue with Stevie Wonder, advised the group to wait "six months" to discuss a new contract, the group took on an offer to sign with Columbia Records, signing with them in 1977. By this point, Billy Griffin's brother Donald, who had begun providing guitar on Miracles studio recordings shortly after Marv Tarplin's departure, had officially joined the group on lead guitar. The group immediately had problems after signing with Columbia, starting with the release of their first Columbia single, "Spy For Brotherhood". Expecting controversy from the single as well as possible threats from the FBI, Columbia pulled the song from the airwaves. The group failed to have a hit during their short Columbia run and in 1978, Pete Moore decided to retire from the road while Billy Griffin wanted to return to his solo career, leading the group to disband.

In 1980, Ronnie White and Bobby Rogers decided to carry on with the Miracles as a touring unit replacing Pete Moore and Billy Griffin with Dave Finley and Carl Cotton, which carried on for three years as "The New Miracles". This version of the Miracles was short-lived though after White decided to retire from show business following the death of his wife Earlyn, who died from breast cancer in 1983, disbanding the group again. Around this same time, most of the original Miracles including Smokey Robinson and Claudette Robinson as well as Pete Moore, Marv Tarplin, and Bobby Rogers reunited to perform a medley of their songs on the 1983 NBC television special, Motown 25: Yesterday, Today, Forever. Ron White was attending his wife Earlyn's funeral around this time, and did not participate in the reunion. Following his exit from the Miracles, Smokey Robinson enjoyed a successful solo career; in 1979, he and Tarplin co-wrote his signature hit, "Cruisin'". Following his reunion with the original Miracles on Motown 25, Robinson became dependent on cocaine, which affected his life and career. He broke the addiction in the late 1980s and revived his singing career, with the Grammy-winning Top 10 hit single, "Just to See Her". In 1986, Smokey's marriage with Claudette Robinson ended in divorce while Bobby's marriage to Marvelettes member Wanda Young ended in 1975. After the release of a 35th anniversary commemorative compilation album in 1993, Ronnie White and Bobby Rogers decided to regroup the Miracles yet again, with Dave Finley returning to the fold and Sidney Justin, a former NFL player and former member of Shalamar, as lead singer. Rogers replaced Justin with Mark Scott, who toured the world as lead singer of the group. Both Justin and Scott lead separate Miracles groups.

Two years later, Ronnie White died from a longtime bout with leukemia, leaving the remaining Miracles as a trio until Tee Turner joined the group in 2001.

Following White's death in 1995, Rogers continued to tour with different members. In 2009, the group received a star on the Hollywood Walk of Fame with Bobby Rogers, Berry Gordy, Smokey Robinson, Stevie Wonder, Pete Moore, Claudette Robinson, and Billy Griffin in attendance. Following another PBS appearance, Rogers was forced into retirement due to health issues, dying less than two years later. Bobby Rogers died in March 2013, two weeks after his 73rd birthday. Pete Moore died on November 19, 2017, his 79th birthday. Former members Carl Cotton, Marv Tarplin and Donald Griffin are also deceased (in 2003, 2011, and 2015 respectively).

As of 2026, Smokey Robinson and former wife Claudette Rogers-Robinson are the last living original members of The Miracles.

== Accolades, awards and honors ==
During their tenure, the Miracles were awarded several times for their songwriting work from both the BMI and ASCAP songwriting and licensing organizations. In 1997, the Miracles were honored by the Rhythm and Blues Foundation with the Pioneer Award for their contributions to music. In 2001, the group was inducted to the Vocal Group Hall of Fame. Three years later, the Miracles were included in Rolling Stone's list of the 100 Greatest Artists of All Time at No. 32, still holding to that position in a revised 2011 edition, making the Miracles the highest-ranking Motown group on the Rolling Stone listing. In both editions, they were immortalized by rock musician Bob Seger, who grew up a Miracles fan. In 2006, Woodbridge Estates, an exclusive residential development in Detroit, named their community park "Miracles Park" and one of its streets "Miracles Boulevard", in recognition of the legendary Motown group's importance to the city, and as a tribute to their many accomplishments in the music industry. In June 2006, the Miracles were voted into the Michigan Rock and Roll Legends Hall of Fame.

In 2009, all the known members of the group (including Billy Griffin) were honored with a star on the Hollywood Walk of Fame, attended by Berry Gordy and Stevie Wonder, who thanked the Miracles (in particular Ronnie White, who had brought the then 11-year-old to Motown's studios), for discovering him. Wonder stated: "Were it not for the Miracles, there would not be a Stevie Wonder". Gordy added that without the Miracles, "Motown would not be the Motown that it is today." Also in 2009, Motown released a special two-CD compilation: The Miracles – Depend on Me: The Early Albums, a collection consisting of the group's first five albums. In 2011, the Miracles were inducted to the Doo-Wop Hall of Fame. That same year, Goldmine magazine named them as one of the 10 greatest doo-wop groups of all time.

In 2015, the Miracles were inducted into The National Rhythm & Blues Hall of Fame in Detroit, Michigan. On their website, it is stated that the Miracles' exclusion from the Rock and Roll Hall of Fame was "outrageous", pointing out Robinson's solo induction went against its own rules. Robinson had only spent 14 years as a solo performer, and his name was not in front of the group's until 1967. It further stated the Miracles were "the heartbeat of Motown in the 1960s, one of the best vocal groups ever formed and owners of some of the greatest records Rock has ever produced." It was also stated that with the Miracles' induction, the Hall of Fame "remedied its most shameful chapter and the biggest miracle is it took this long to do it."

In May 2016, The National Academy of Recording Arts and Sciences paid tribute to the Miracles with a special year-long career retrospective of the group at The Grammy Museum in Los Angeles entitled "Legends of Motown: Celebrating the Miracles", highlighting their groundbreaking history and accomplishments as Motown's first recording artists, with appearances by original Miracles Claudette Rogers-Robinson and Pete Moore. The Miracles are four-time Grammy Hall of Fame inductees. At this special showing, as an expression of her gratitude, Ms Robinson stated:

"It is my honor to be recognized by the GRAMMY Museum's Legends of Motown series. I am grateful that the GRAMMY Museum provided a platform for fans to experience the history of the Miracles and include items from my private collection to be displayed. The Miracles along with Mr. Berry Gordy and Motown have become a part of musical history that changed the landscape of popular music, soul and R&B to foster positive and progressive race relations in America and around the world. Thank you for the amazing opportunity."

In a tribute to Motown's first group, Martha Reeves of Martha and the Vandellas stated: "In Liverpool they have a statue of the Beatles. Someplace in Detroit there should be a statue of (Smokey Robinson and) the Miracles."

=== The 1987 Rock & Roll Hall of Fame controversy and 2012 induction ===
In 1987, former Miracles lead singer Smokey Robinson was inducted to the Rock & Roll Hall of Fame as a solo artist, without his fellow Miracles, which Robinson expressed deep regret and disappointment that his group-mates were not inducted with him. This solo induction triggered shockwaves and cries of protest throughout the music industry. In an article in the oldies music magazine Goldmine, editor Phil Marder stated: "How did Smokey Robinson get inducted without (the rest of) the Miracles?"

"Robinson certainly deserves solo induction due to his songwriting, producing, solo career and his contributions in many official capacities in Motown's front office. But if the Supremes got in with Diana Ross and the Vandellas made it in with Martha Reeves and the three other [Four] Tops made it in with Levi Stubbs, how could the Miracles, who were much more important, not get in with Smokey?"

Miracles bass singer Pete Moore told the Cleveland Plain Dealer: "It was a slap in the face, very disappointing. We are the premier group of Motown. We were there before there even was a Motown. We set the pace for all the other artists to come after us. We were a little older, and the other artists looked up to us. How could we not be in there?" Moore later stated, "When Terry Stewart [Rock Hall president and CEO] called and told me we were to be inducted, he was apologetic," Moore said. "He said it should have been done years ago, everybody knew it. He said they received many, many calls over the years from angry (Miracles) fans."

Robinson had told Billboard that he had been lobbying for the Miracles since his own induction, "making calls and signing petitions and everything, because they really deserve it." Though some felt Robinson should have been included as an inductee with the other Miracles, Robinson said: "I don't really even care about that. I'm already in there. I don't understand why it was, like, a task to get the Miracles in there. We were one of the hottest and most prolific groups in the world at that time, so I don't understand the hesitancy." Claudette Robinson stated, "When I spoke to (Rock and Roll Hall of Fame & Museum President and CEO) Terry Stewart, he said he got no less than 900 e-mails per day saying the Miracles should be inducted, and why aren't they? I was surprised by that. I would think five or 10, but he said that amount, so it's a lot of people that were really pulling for us. You have to be thankful and grateful for that." However, before this decision, Miracle Marv Tarplin died in September 2011 at the age of 70, just months before the induction ceremony.

The Miracles were inducted into the Rock and Roll Hall of Fame as part of the class of 2012 along with five other groups whose leader had been inducted as a solo artist. Upon their induction, Claudette Robinson told Billboard: "I didn't think it would happen in my lifetime. For the longest time so many people have put in their comments and tried so hard for us to be inducted, and there was always a reason we weren't. So I was a little shocked when they called and said it would happen." Robinson was selected as the induction speaker for the Miracles and the other five groups. The inducted members were original members Claudette Rogers-Robinson, Pete Moore, Bobby Rogers, Ronnie White (posthumously), and Marv Tarplin (posthumously).

== Legacy ==
The Miracles and their music have had worldwide impact, influencing scores of artists of many different musical genres around the globe. The original lineup of the group has consistently been revered by several critics in major rock and music magazines and have received numerous honors and awards for their contributions to the music industry. One of their most honored songs, "The Tracks of My Tears", was included in the United States Library of Congress' National Recording Registry because of its "culturally, historically and aesthetically significance" in 2008. It was also chosen as one of the Top 10 Best Songs of All Time by a panel of 20 top industry songwriters and producers including Hal David, Paul McCartney, Brian Wilson, Jerry Leiber, and others as reported to Britain's Mojo music magazine, and was also winner of "The Award of Merit" from The American Society of Composers, Authors, and Publishers (ASCAP) for the song's writers, Miracles members Pete Moore, Marv Tarplin and Smokey Robinson. In addition, "The Tracks of My Tears" has been ranked by the Recording Industry Association of America and The National Endowment for the Arts at No. 127 in its list of the Songs of the Century – the 365 Greatest Songs of the 20th Century. And in 2021,Rolling Stone Magazine selected The Miracles'"The Tracks of My Tears"as "The Greatest Motown Song of All Time." Their hit-filled 1965 album, Going to a Go-Go is listed on Rolling Stone Magazine's list of "The 500 Greatest Albums of All Time". Four of the group's songs were inducted into the Grammy Hall of Fame including "You Really Got a Hold on Me", "Tears of a Clown", "Shop Around" and "Tracks of My Tears". In addition, "You Really Got a Hold on Me", "Going to a Go-Go", "Shop Around" and "Tracks of My Tears" were inducted to the Rock & Roll Hall of Fame as part of their list of The 500 Songs That Shaped Rock and Roll. In addition, The Miracles hit — “The Tracks of My Tears,” has been selected by the National Recording Preservation Board for the United States Library of Congress’ National Recording Registry, which honors and preserves culturally, historically and aesthetically significant American recordings. The group was also ranked No. 61 on VH-1's 100 Greatest Rock Stars of All Time in 1998 while also ranking at No. 71 on Billboard's 100 Greatest Artists of All Time in 2008.They have also been inducted into the Hit Parade Hall of Fame as of 2014. and the R&B Music Hall of Fame in 2015.

Commenting to Rolling Stone Magazine, Bob Seger said: "I used to go to the Motown Revues, and the Miracles always closed the show. They were that good, and everybody knew it." Producer Quincy Jones called the group the "Beethovens of The 20th Century" due to their songwriting talents. In addition, the Miracles have been regarded as the most covered act in Motown's roster and have influenced numerous artists worldwide in the last 50 years.

The success of the Miracles actually launched the Motown Records label, and, according to Motown Records founder, Berry Gordy, without the Miracles, the Motown Record Corporation would not have been possible.

== Members ==
Classic lineup

- Ronald "Ronnie" White (1955–1978, 1980–1983, 1993–1995; died 1995)
- Robert "Bobby" Rogers (1955–1978, 1980–1983, 1993–2011; died 2013)
- Warren "Pete" Moore (1955–1978; died 2017)
- William "Smokey" Robinson, Jr. (1955–1972, 1983)
- Claudette Rogers Robinson (1957–1972, 1983; occasional appearances between 1993 and 2011)
- Marv Tarplin – guitar (1958–1973; died 2011)

== Discography ==
The Miracles

- Hi... We're the Miracles (1961)
- Cookin' with the Miracles (1961)
- I'll Try Something New (1962)
- The Fabulous Miracles (1963)
- The Miracles Doin' Mickey's Monkey (1963)
- I Like It Like That (1964)

Smokey Robinson & the Miracles

- Going to a Go-Go (1965)
- Away We a Go-Go (1966)
- Make It Happen (1967) (Reissued in 1970 as The Tears of a Clown )
- Special Occasion (1968)
- Time Out for Smokey Robinson & The Miracles (1969)
- Four in Blue (1969)
- What Love Has...Joined Together (1970)
- A Pocket Full of Miracles (1970)
- The Season for Miracles (1970)
- One Dozen Roses (1971)
- Flying High Together (1972)

The Miracles

- Renaissance (1973)
- Do It Baby (1974)
- Don't Cha Love It (1975)
- City of Angels (1975)
- The Power of Music (1976)
- Love Crazy (1977)
- The Miracles (1978)
