= Billy Griffin =

American singer (born 1950)

- Born: William L. Griffin; August 15, 1950 (age 76); Baltimore, Maryland, U.S.
- Genres: R&B; soul; pop; disco
- Occupations: Singer, songwriter
- Years active: 1971–present
- Labels: Motown, Columbia, Atlantic, Motorcity, RNB Entertainment & Expansion

William L. Griffin (born August 15, 1950) is an American singer and songwriter. He replaced Smokey Robinson as the lead singer of the Miracles in 1972.

== Biography ==
Griffin was born and raised in West Baltimore, Maryland. He attended Garrison Junior High School and Forest Park High School. Griffin, like his brother Donald Griffin (1955–2015), (who later replaced Marv Tarplin in the Miracles), was a guitarist, as well as a singer, and sang with a local Baltimore group called the Last Dynasty. Damon Harris, who later went on to fame as a member of the Temptations, was a high school friend and group member in another local group, the Young Tempts (later renamed as the Young Vandals). Griffin idolized Miracles lead singer Smokey Robinson, while Harris idolized Temptation Eddie Kendricks. Both of them wound up as replacements for their idols in their respective groups.

Griffin and three friends formed the group Last Dynasty and won a talent program on NBC Television.

During the Miracles' nationwide 1972 Farewell Tour with Smokey Robinson, Griffin was introduced by Robinson as his replacement in the Miracles as lead singer. After a year of woodshedding with Motown's famous Artist Development Dept., Griffin released his first single with the Miracles, "What Is a Heart Good For", from their first post-Robinson album, Renaissance in 1973. Griffin sang this song on his first national television appearance as a Miracle with the remaining group members of the Miracles, Bobby Rogers, Ronnie White, and Pete Moore on another NBC music program, The Midnight Special, in 1973, hosted by Robinson. The single was withdrawn and replaced with a ballad, "Don't Let It End (Till You Let It Begin)", which was a mild hit. After a second single, "Give Me Just Another Day", was released later that year, Under the management of Martin Pichinson, the Miracles released "Do It Baby" in 1974, which peaked at #4 on the Billboard R&B charts and became the group's first bona-fide hit with Griffin.

Like Robinson before him, Griffin co-wrote many of the Miracles' songs, in addition to singing lead. Griffin and original Miracles member Pete Moore wrote all of the Miracles' 1975 platinum-selling album, City of Angels. During his tenure with the group, they recorded three hits: "Do It Baby" in 1974, and the Miracles' most successful single, the number-one hit "Love Machine", in 1975, which sold 4.5 million records worldwide. Griffin also sung lead on "Don't Cha Love It", a top 10 R&B #4 single.

The Miracles left Motown in 1976, signing with Columbia Records. After two albums for Columbia, Griffin and Moore decided to retire from performing and focus on songwriting. In 1982, Griffin released his first solo album, Be with Me, which yielded the UK Singles Chart top 20 hit "Hold Me Tighter in the Rain". The following year, Respect yielded the club hit, "Serious" which peaked at #64 on the UK charts. After a third album with Leon Ware, Griffin switched record label to Atlantic Records but despite completing an album, only one single "Believe It or Not" was released there before he was left without a recording contract.

In 1989, Griffin joined UK record producer Ian Levine's Motown-reunion project Motorcity Records, and was the first to release a single on the label, "First in Line". Griffin also fronted a Miracles reunion with a new recording of "Love Machine". Griffin became a writer and backing vocals arranger for several of the other artists, and recorded a large number of tracks himself, but his album Technicolour was never released and the label collapsed in 1992. Most of his Motorcity recordings were released on the 1996 compilation Best of Billy Griffin.

Levine and Griffin also landed a couple of hit singles for the UK soul band the Pasadenas and co-produced Take That's debut album, which included the hit singles "Could It Be Magic" (UK #3) and "I Found Heaven" (UK #15). They also worked with Levine's boy band, Bad Boys Inc.

Griffin has written songs and sung backing vocals for Aretha Franklin, the O'Jays, Ronald Isley, Freda Payne, Edwin Starr, Evelyn Champagne King, Herb Alpert, Martine McCutcheon, the Emotions and many others. In 2006, Griffin released his latest solo album, Like Water. Griffin can be seen performing "Do It Baby" and "Love Machine" with the Miracles on the Motown/Universal DVD release Smokey Robinson & the Miracles: The Definitive Performances 1963-1987.

The Miracles' song "Love Machine" was sampled into CeeLo Green's 2002 single "Closet Freak" and also into the 2010 single by Drake titled "Miss Me". These two productions were slated for re-release on greatest hits CDs for Green and Drake. Today, Griffin is co-owner of his own music publishing company, Grimora Music (owned with original Miracles member Pete Moore (Griffin + Moore)-a.

== Recognition ==
Griffin was honored with the other Miracles when the group received a Star on the Hollywood Walk of Fame on March 20, 2009.

In 1987, Smokey Robinson was inducted into the Rock and Roll Hall of Fame as a solo artist, but Griffin and the other members of the Miracles were not. In 2012, the Miracles were inducted into the Hall of Fame as a group, but Griffin was not included. The inducted members of the Miracles were Warren "Pete" Moore, Claudette Rogers Robinson, Bobby Rogers, Marvin Tarplin, and Ronald White.

== Solo discography ==
=== Albums ===
Year	Title	US R&B
1982	Be With Me	—
1983	Respect	63
1985	Systematic	—
1996	The Very Best of Billy Griffin	—
2006	Like Water	—

=== Singles ===
Year	Title	Peak chart positions	
Year	Title	US R&B	UK
1982	"Be with Me"	—	99
1982	"Hold Me Tighter in the Rain"	—	17
1983	"Respect"	61	—
1983	"Serious"	37	64
1985	"Systematic"	—	—
1985	"If I Ever Lose This Heaven"	—	—
1986	"Believe It or Not"	66	—
1987	"The Girl Is Fine"	—	—
1989	"First in Line"	—	—
1991	"Technicolour"	—	98
1992	"True Confessions"	—	—
"—" denotes releases that did not chart.
