= Warren "Pete" Moore =

American singer-songwriter and record producer

- Moore c. 1965

Background information
- Born: Warren Thomas Moore; November 19, 1938; Detroit, Michigan, U.S.
- Died: November 19, 2017 (aged 79) Las Vegas, Nevada, U.S.
- Occupations: Singer-songwriter; record producer; entrepreneur; arranger; Music publisher
- Labels: Tamla; Motown

Warren Thomas "Pete" Moore (November 19, 1938 – November 19, 2017) was an American singer-songwriter and record producer, notable as the bass singer for Motown group the Miracles from 1955 onwards, and was one of the group's original members. He is also a 2012 Rock and Roll Hall of Fame Inductee, and a BMI and ASCAP award-winning songwriter, and was the vocal arranger on all of the group's hits.

== Career ==
Moore was born on November 19, 1938, in Detroit, Michigan. A childhood friend of Miracles lead singer Smokey Robinson, the two met at a musical event given by the Detroit Public School system, where Moore spotted Robinson singing as part of the show. The two became friends and formed a singing group, which eventually became the Miracles. Besides his work in the Miracles, Moore helped Robinson write several hit songs, including The Temptations' "It's Growing" and "Since I Lost My Baby", and two of Marvin Gaye's biggest hits, the Top 10 million sellers, "Ain't That Peculiar" and "I'll Be Doggone".

Moore also co-wrote several of The Miracles' own hits. These included "Ooo Baby Baby" (1965), the million-selling Grammy Hall of Fame Inductee "The Tracks of My Tears" (also 1965), for which he won the ASCAP Award Of Merit, "My Girl Has Gone", another Top 20 hit from 1965, "Going to a Go-Go" (also 1965), (where he came up with the song's initial percussion sequence), and the multi-million selling #1 Pop smash, "Love Machine" (co-written with Miracles' member Billy Griffin) and the platinum album from which it came, City of Angels, among others. Moore as leader of the Miracles enjoyed other hits with Griffin i.e. Do it Baby which was the Miracles first major hit after Smokey left the group. Moore and the group signed a management agreement with Martin Pichinson who also managed Lou Rawls and Bill Withers. Pichinson was very instrumental in developing the new direction for the Miracles.

The song "Overture" from that album, also co-written by Moore and Billy Griffin, was used as the official theme on Radio Monte Carlo in France from 1978 to 1979. Moore also sung co-lead on a few recordings as well, such as "I Love Your Baby" and the groups' Billboard Top 40 hit "Doggone Right". Pete was also an accomplished producer, having produced several hit songs, including the Miracles' 1965 R&B chart hit, "Choosey Beggar", their 1969 hit, "Here I Go Again", the group's million-selling Top 10 hit, "Baby Baby Don't Cry" (also 1969), and the aforementioned City Of Angels album, along with albums by Marvin Gaye, and the Supremes.

In late 2006, Moore reunited with original Miracles members Smokey Robinson and Bobby Rogers for an extended interview on the Motown DVD release, Smokey Robinson & The Miracles: The Definitive Performances. In the interview, Moore revealed for the first time that he was the group's uncredited vocal arranger. The second most prolific songwriter in the Miracles after Robinson, Moore's compositions have been recorded by Linda Ronstadt, Michael Jackson, Marvin Gaye, Aretha Franklin, George Michael, The Rolling Stones, Ramsey Lewis, Tom Jones, Luther Vandross, The Temptations, The Four Tops and Debby Boone.

Moore was owner and CEO of Las Vegas-based entertainment firm, WBMM Enterprises, and co-owner, with Miracles member Billy Griffin, of music publishing company, Grimora Music. Moore and his wife Tina have two grown daughters, Monette and Monique.

== Awards and legacy ==
In 2007 Moore reunited on stage with original Miracles Bobby Rogers, Claudette Robinson, and Smokey Robinson to celebrate the group's 50th anniversary. In 2009, the Miracles received a star on the Hollywood Walk of Fame. Pete was also inducted with the rest of The Miracles into the Vocal Group Hall of Fame in 2001.

In 2012, Pete Moore was retroactively inducted with the rest of the original Miracles, Bobby Rogers, Ron White, Claudette Robinson, and Marv Tarplin into The Rock and Roll Hall of Fame alongside Miracles lead singer Smokey Robinson. The induction was handled by a Special Committee, under the premise that the entire group should have been inducted with Robinson back in 1987. Miracles lead singer Smokey Robinson was the only member of the Miracles to have been inducted into the Rock and Roll Hall of Fame in 1987. Moore was also inducted into the Rhythm and Blues Music Hall of Fame as a founding member of The Miracles in his hometown of Detroit, on October 4, 2015.

== Death ==
Pete Moore died on his 79th birthday in Las Vegas, Nevada due to complications of diabetes.

In a tribute to Pete, Motown Records founder Berry Gordy stated: "I am deeply saddened to hear of the passing of Warren 'Pete' Moore, a fine human being and valued member of the Motown family," Gordy said. "Pete was an original member of my very first group, the Miracles. He was a quiet spirit with a wonderful Bass voice behind Smokey Robinson’s soft, distinctive lead vocals and was co-writer on several of the Miracles hits." Original Miracles member Claudette Rogers-Robinson placed flowers on the Miracles' Hollywood Walk of Fame Star on November 21, 2017, in Hollywood, California in tribute to Moore. According to Tina, his wife of over 40 years, the cause of death was complications of diabetes. Besides his wife, Pete was survived by his sister, Winifred Moore, and adult twin daughters, Monette and Monique. The deaths of White, Tarplin, Rogers and Moore leave Smokey Robinson and Claudette Rogers-Robinson as the last surviving original members of The Miracles as of late 2020.
