= The Ultimate Collection (The Miracles album) =

Compilation album by The Miracles
- Released: February 10, 1998
- Recorded: 1959–1972
- Genre: Soul music
- Length: 71:03
- Label: Motown Records
- Producer: Harry Weinger

The Miracles chronology
The Thirty-Fifth Anniversary Collection (1994)	The Ultimate Collection (1998)	Depend On Me: The Early Albums (2009)

Professional ratings
Review scores
Source	Rating
Allmusic	5/5 stars

The Ultimate Collection is a compact disc by Smokey Robinson and The Miracles, released on Motown Records, catalogue 314530857-2, in February 1998. It is a collection of singles comprising many of the group's greatest hits, with liner notes written by Stu Hackel.

== Content ==
The disc contains seventeen top ten Rhythm and Blues singles chart hits, and nineteen Top 40 hits on the Billboard Hot 100 enjoyed by the Miracles and released on the Motown subsidiary label Tamla Records imprint. The only exception is "Bad Girl," released locally in the Detroit area on the Motown label (the first single under this imprint) but nationally licensed to Chess Records. Three of the tracks included were B-sides — "Who's Lovin' You," "Choosey Beggar," and "(You Can) Depend on Me" — respectively the flipsides to "Shop Around," "Going to A Go-Go," and "Way Over There," with "Choosey Beggar" charting independently of its A-side on the R&B singles chart. "The Tears of A Clown" had been initially buried as a track on the album Make It Happen in 1967, but to quell clamor for more record releases by the group in the United Kingdom became a belated hit three years later. Issued in the United States shortly thereafter, it was the Miracles' only #1 hit with Smokey Robinson on the American pop singles chart. Years later, the group hit #1 again on the Billboard Pop chart with the smash hit "Love Machine," but by then Robinson had long since left the group, replaced with Billy Griffin. The disc was part of an "Ultimate Collection" series initiated in 1997 by Motown for many of their top-selling classic artists.

Starting in the late 1960s and early 1970s, standard industry practice shifted to a focus on album sales, where a single became less a separate entity and more simply an advertisement for an LP, and a lead single would be pulled off an album as a promotional tool. Prior to this, singles were concentrated upon as a profitable commodity, especially for smaller record labels, and albums were often built around already successful singles. Since Motown fixated on the hit single until the very end of its stay in Detroit, single versions of songs often featured different mixes than versions that would be later placed on albums. Singles were usually mixed "punchier" and "hotter" to sound better on car radios receiving AM broadcast. The single versions are the ones appearing here.

All six original members of The Miracles are pictured on the cover, clockwise from left: Claudette Robinson, her cousin Bobby Rogers, Ronnie White, Smokey Robinson, Marv Tarplin, and Pete Moore .

== Personnel: The Miracles ==
- William "Smokey" Robinson — tenor/falsetto vocals; lead vocals
- Claudette Rogers Robinson — soprano vocals; co-lead vocals on "Way Over There"
- Robert Rogers — second tenor vocals; co-lead vocals on "You've Really Got A Hold On Me"
- Ronald White — baritone vocals
- Warren "Pete" Moore — bass vocals, vocal arrangements
- Marv Tarplin — electric guitar
- The Funk Brothers — instruments
- Members of the Detroit Symphony Orchestra conducted by Gordon Staples — strings

== Track listing ==
Singles chart peak positions from Billboard charts; no R&B chart existed from November 30, 1963, through January 23, 1965.

Track	Catalogue	Release date	Pop Chart	R&B Chart	Song title	Writer(s)	Time
1.	Tamla 54127	12/6/65	#11	#2	Going to A Go-Go	Smokey Robinson, Warren Moore, Marvin Tarplin, Robert Rogers	2:49
2.	Tamla 54159	10/12/67	#4	#1	I Second That Emotion	Smokey Robinson and Al Cleveland	2:40
3.	Tamla 54034	10/15/60	#2	#1	Shop Around	Smokey Robinson and Berry Gordy	2:48
4.	Tamla 54028	4/4/60	#94		Way Over There	Smokey Robinson and Berry Gordy	2:55
5.	Chess 1734	9/59	#93		Bad Girl	Smokey Robinson and Berry Gordy	2:42
6.	Tamla 54034b	10/15/60			Who's Lovin' You	Smokey Robinson	3:02
7.	Tamla 54059	4/9/62	#39	#11	I'll Try Something New	Smokey Robinson	2:36
8.	Tamla 54073	11/9/62	#8	#1	You've Really Got A Hold on Me	Smokey Robinson	2:56
9.	Tamla 54083	7/26/63	#8	#3	Mickey's Monkey	Brian Holland, Lamont Dozier, Edward Holland Jr.	2:46
10.	Tamla 54098	6/3/64	#27		I Like It Like That	Smokey Robinson and Marvin Tarplin	2:34
11.	Tamla 54113	3/5/65	#16	#4	Ooo Baby Baby	Smokey Robinson and Warren Moore	2:42
12.	Tamla 54127b	12/6/65		#35	Choosey Beggar	Smokey Robinson and Warren Moore	2:32
13.	Tamla 54123	9/22/65	#14	#3	My Girl Has Gone	Smokey Robinson, Warren Moore, Marvin Tarplin, Ronald White	2:52
14.	Tamla 54199	9/24/70	#1	#1	The Tears of A Clown	Smokey Robinson, Stevie Wonder, Henry Cosby	3:03
15.	Tamla 54178	12/12/68	#8	#3	Baby, Baby Don't Cry	Smokey Robinson, Al Cleveland, Terry Johnson	3:58
16.	Tamla 54118	6/23/65	#16	#2	The Tracks of My Tears	Smokey Robinson, Warren Moore, Marvin Tarplin	3:00
17.	Tamla 54145	1/27/67	#20	#10	The Love I Saw in You Was Just A Mirage	Smokey Robinson and Marvin Tarplin	2:57
18.	Tamla 54140	10/19/66	#17	#4	(Come 'Round Here) I'm the One You Need	Brian Holland, Lamont Dozier, Edward Holland Jr.	2:29
19.	Tamla 54152	5/26/67	#23	#5	More Love	Smokey Robinson	2:48
20.	Tamla 54172	7/30/68	#26	#4	Special Occasion	Smokey Robinson and Al Cleveland	2:18
21.	Tamla 54162	2/8/68	#11	#3	If You Can Want	Smokey Robinson	2:25
22.	Tamla 54167	5/13/68	#31	#9	Yester Love	Smokey Robinson and Al Cleveland	2:17
23.	Tamla 54220	5/4/72	#46	#9	We've Come Too Far to End It Now	Smokey Robinson and Al Cleveland	3:49
24.	Tamla 54053	10/14/61	#35	#16	What's So Good About Goodbye	Smokey Robinson	2:21
25.	Tamla 54028b	4/4/60			(You Can) Depend on Me	Smokey Robinson and Berry Gordy	2:40

== Certifications ==
Region	Certification	Certified units/sales
United Kingdom (BPI)	Silver	60,000^{‡}
^{‡} Sales+streaming figures based on certification alone.
