= List of songs written by Smokey Robinson =

This is a list of songs written by Smokey Robinson.

== Chart hits and other notable songs written by Smokey Robinson ==
| Year | Song | Original artist | Co-writer(s) with Robinson | ^{U.S. Pop} | ^{U.S. R&B} | ^{UK Singles Chart} | Other charting versions, and notes |
|---|---|---|---|---|---|---|---|
| 1959 | "Bad Girl" | The Miracles | Berry Gordy Jr. | 93 | - | - | |
| 1960 | "Who's the Fool" | Singin' Sammy Ward | Berry Gordy Jr. | - | 23 | - | |
| 1960 | "Shop Around" | The Miracles | Berry Gordy Jr. | 2 | 1 | - | 1976: Captain & Tennille, #4 US |
| 1960 | "Who's Lovin' You" | The Miracles | | 66 | 19 | - | 1967: Brenda and the Tabulations, #66 US, #19 R&B |
| 1961 | "Don't Let Him Shop Around" | Debbie Dean | Berry Gordy Jr., Loucye Gordy Wakefield | 92 | - | - | |
| 1961 | "Ain't It Baby" | The Miracles | Berry Gordy Jr. | 49 | 15 | - | |
| 1961 | "Broken Hearted" | The Miracles | Berry Gordy Jr. | 97 | - | - | |
| 1961 | "After All" | The Miracles | | - | - | - | |
| 1961 | "Mighty Good Lovin'" | The Miracles | | 51 | 21 | - | |
| 1961 | "Everybody's Gotta Pay Some Dues" | The Miracles | Ronald White | 52 | 11 | - | |
| 1962 | "What's So Good About Goodbye" | The Miracles | | 35 | 16 | - | |
| 1962 | "The One Who Really Loves You" | Mary Wells | | 8 | 2 | - | |
| 1962 | "I'll Try Something New" | The Miracles | | 39 | 11 | - | 1969: Diana Ross & the Supremes and the Temptations, #25 US, #8 R&B; 1982: A Taste of Honey, #41 US, #9 R&B |
| 1962 | "You Beat Me to the Punch" | Mary Wells | Ronald White | 9 | 1 | - | |
| 1962 | "Your Heart Belongs to Me" | The Supremes | | 95 | - | - | |
| 1962 | "Way Over There" | The Miracles | Berry Gordy Jr. | 94 | - | - | |
| 1962 | "You Threw a Lucky Punch" | Gene Chandler | Ronald White, Don Covay | 49 | 25 | - | |
| 1962 | "Two Lovers" | Mary Wells | | 7 | 1 | - | |
| 1962 | "Operator" | Mary Wells | | - | - | - | |
| 1962 | "You've Really Got a Hold on Me" | The Miracles | | 8 | 1 | - | 1972: Gayle McCormick, #98 US; 1978: Eddie Money, #72 US |
| 1962 | "Happy Landing" | The Miracles | Ronald White | - | - | - | |
| 1963 | "Laughing Boy" | Mary Wells | | 15 | 6 | - | |
| 1963 | "Two Wrongs Don't Make a Right" | Mary Wells | Berry Gordy Jr. | 100 | - | - | |
| 1963 | "A Love She Can Count On" | The Miracles | | 31 | 21 | - | |
| 1963 | "I Want a Love I Can See" | The Temptations | | - | - | - | |
| 1963 | "Your Old Standby" | Mary Wells | Janie Bradford | 40 | 8 | - | |
| 1963 | "A Breathtaking Guy" | The Supremes | | 75 | - | - | |
| 1963 | "What's So Easy for Two Is So Hard for One" | Mary Wells | | 29 | 8 | - | |
| 1963 | "As Long As I Know He's Mine" | The Marvelettes | | 47 | 3 | - | |
| 1964 | "He's a Good Guy (Yes He Is)" | The Marvelettes | | 55 | 18 | - | |
| 1964 | "The Way You Do the Things You Do" | The Temptations | Bobby Rogers | 11 | 1 | - | 1978: Rita Coolidge, #20 US; 1985: Hall & Oates with David Ruffin & Eddie Kendricks, #20 US, #40 R&B, #58 UK; 1990: UB40, #6 US, #49 UK |
| 1964 | "(You Can't Let the Boy Overpower) The Man in You" | The Miracles | | 59 | 12 | - | 1968: Chuck Jackson, #94 US |
| 1964 | "My Guy" | Mary Wells | | 1 | 1 | 5 | 1972: Petula Clark, #70 US; 1972: Mary Wells, #14 UK (reissue); 1980: Amii Stewart & Johnny Bristol, "My Guy - My Girl", #63 US, #76 R&B, #39 UK; 1982: Sister Sledge, #23 US, #14 R&B; 1985: Amii Stewart & Deon Estus, "My Guy - My Girl", #63 UK |
| 1964 | "I'll Be in Trouble" | The Temptations | | 33 | 22 | - | |
| 1964 | "I Like It Like That" | The Miracles | Marv Tarplin | 27 | 10 | - | |
| 1964 | "You're My Remedy" | The Marvelettes | | 48 | 16 | - | |
| 1964 | "Baby, Baby I Need You" | The Temptations | | - | - | - | |
| 1964 | "That's What Love Is Made of" | The Miracles | Bobby Rogers, Pete Moore | 35 | 9 | - | |
| 1964 | "Come On Do the Jerk" | The Miracles | Marv Tarplin, Bobby Rogers, Ronald White | 50 | 22 | - | |
| 1965 | "My Girl" | The Temptations | Ronald White | 1 | 1 | 43 | 1965: Otis Redding, #11 UK; 1968: Otis Redding, #36 UK (reissue); 1968: Bobby Vee, #35 US; 1970: Eddie Floyd, #43 R&B; 1980: The Whispers, #26 UK; 1980: Amii Stewart & Johnny Bristol, "My Guy - My Girl", #63 US, #76 R&B, #39 UK; 1985: Amii Stewart & Deon Estus, "My Guy - My Girl", #63 UK; 1986: The Temptations, #92 UK (reissue); 1988: Suave, #20 US, #3 R&B; 1992: The Temptations, #2 UK (reissue) |
| 1965 | "That Day When She Needed Me" | The Contours | | - | 37 | - | |
| 1965 | "My Smile Is Just a Frown (Turned Upside Down)" | Carolyn Crawford | Janie Bradford, William "Mickey" Stevenson | - | 39 | - | |
| 1965 | "When I'm Gone" | Brenda Holloway | | 25 | 12 | - | |
| 1965 | "I'll Be Doggone" | Marvin Gaye | Pete Moore, Marv Tarplin | 8 | 1 | - | |
| 1965 | "Ooo Baby Baby" | The Miracles | Pete Moore | 16 | 4 | - | 1967: The Five Stairsteps, #63 US, #34 R&B; 1977: Shalamar, #59 R&B; 1978: Linda Ronstadt, #7 US, #77 R&B; 1987: Romeo, #67 R&B; 1989: Zapp, #18 R&B |
| 1965 | "It's Growing" | The Temptations | Pete Moore | 18 | 3 | 45 | |
| 1965 | "Operator" | Brenda Holloway | | 78 | 36 | - | |
| 1965 | "The Tracks of My Tears" | The Miracles | Pete Moore, Marv Tarplin | 16 | 2 | - | 1967: Johnny Rivers, #10 US; 1969: Aretha Franklin, #71 US, #21 R&B; 1969: Smokey Robinson & the Miracles, #9 UK (reissue); 1975: Linda Ronstadt, #25 US, #42 UK; 1982: Colin Blunstone, #60 UK; 1987: Smokey Robinson & the Miracles, #82 UK (reissue); 1993: Go West, #16 UK |
| 1965 | "A Fork in the Road" | The Miracles | | - | - | - | 1982: Rebbie Jackson, #40 R&B |
| 1965 | "Since I Lost My Baby" | The Temptations | Pete Moore | 17 | 4 | - | 1982: Luther Vandross, #17 R&B |
| 1965 | "You've Got To Earn It" | The Temptations | Cornelius Grant | - | 22 | - | 1971: The Staple Singers, #97 US, #11 R&B |
| 1965 | "First I Look at the Purse" | The Contours | Bobby Rogers | 57 | 12 | - | |
| 1965 | "Ain't That Peculiar" | Marvin Gaye | Marv Tarplin, Bobby Rogers, Pete Moore | 8 | 1 | - | 1969: George Tindley, #35 R&B; 1972: Fanny, #85 US; 1975: Diamond Reo, #44 US; 1983: Stevie Woods, #54 R&B; 1984: Mari Wilson, #78 UK |
| 1965 | "My Girl Has Gone" | The Miracles | Ronald White, Pete Moore, Marv Tarplin | 14 | 3 | - | |
| 1965 | "My Baby" | The Temptations | Ronald White, Pete Moore | 13 | 4 | - | |
| 1965 | "Don't Look Back" | The Temptations | Ronald White | 83 | 15 | - | 1978: Peter Tosh, #81 US; 1979: Teena Marie, #91 R&B |
| 1965 | "Choosey Beggar" | The Miracles | Pete Moore | - | 35 | - | |
| 1965 | "Going to a Go-Go" | The Miracles | Pete Moore, Bobby Rogers, Marv Tarplin | 11 | 2 | 44 | 1975: The Sharonettes, #46 UK; 1982: The Rolling Stones, #25 US, #26 UK |
| 1965 | "From Head to Toe" | The Miracles | | - | - | - | 1982: Elvis Costello & the Attractions, #43 UK |
| 1966 | "Don't Mess with Bill" | The Marvelettes | | 7 | 3 | - | |
| 1966 | "One More Heartache" | Marvin Gaye | Pete Moore, Bobby Rogers, Marv Tarplin | 29 | 4 | - | |
| 1966 | "Get Ready" | The Temptations | | 29 | 1 | - | 1969: The Temptations, #10 UK (reissue); 1970: King Curtis, #46 R&B; 1970: Rare Earth, #4 US, #20 R&B; 1971: Syl Johnson, #34 R&B; 1972: Donnie Elbert, #51 UK; 1979: Smokey Robinson, #82 R&B |
| 1966 | "You're the One" | The Marvelettes | | 48 | 20 | - | |
| 1966 | "Take This Heart of Mine" | Marvin Gaye | Pete Moore, Marv Tarplin | 44 | 16 | 56 | |
| 1967 | "The Hunter Gets Captured by the Game" | The Marvelettes | | 13 | 2 | - | 1980: Grace Jones, #87 R&B |
| 1967 | "The Love I Saw in You Was Just a Mirage" | Smokey Robinson & the Miracles | Marv Tarplin | 20 | 10 | - | |
| 1967 | "Come Spy with Me" | Smokey Robinson & the Miracles | Marv Tarplin | - | - | - | |
| 1967 | "More Love" | Smokey Robinson & the Miracles | | 23 | 13 | - | 1980: Kim Carnes, #10 US |
| 1967 | "I Second That Emotion" | Smokey Robinson & the Miracles | Al Cleveland | 4 | 1 | 27 | 1969: Diana Ross & the Supremes and the Temptations, #18 UK; 1978: Thelma Jones, #74 R&B; 1982: Japan, #9 UK; 1989: 10db, #18 R&B; 1989: Alyson Williams, #44 UK |
| 1967 | "My Baby Must Be a Magician" | The Marvelettes | | 17 | 8 | - | |
| 1968 | "If You Can Want" | Smokey Robinson & the Miracles | | 11 | 3 | 50 | |
| 1968 | "Girls Girls Girls" | Chuck Jackson | Al Cleveland | - | - | 59 | |
| 1968 | "Yester Love" | Smokey Robinson & the Miracles | Al Cleveland | 31 | 9 | - | |
| 1968 | "Here I Am Baby" | The Marvelettes | | 44 | 14 | - | |
| 1968 | "Special Occasion" | Smokey Robinson & the Miracles | Al Cleveland | 26 | 4 | - | |
| 1968 | "Malinda" | Bobby Taylor & the Vancouvers | Al Cleveland, Terry Johnson | 48 | 16 | - | |
| 1968 | "He's My Sunny Boy" | Diana Ross & the Supremes | | - | - | - | |
| 1969 | "Baby, Baby Don't Cry" | Smokey Robinson & the Miracles | Al Cleveland, Terry Johnson | 8 | 3 | - | |
| 1969 | "The Composer" | Diana Ross & the Supremes | | 27 | 21 | - | |
| 1969 | "Doggone Right" | Smokey Robinson & the Miracles | Al Cleveland, Terry Johnson | 32 | 7 | - | |
| 1969 | "Here I Go Again" | Smokey Robinson & the Miracles | Pete Moore, Al Cleveland, Terry Johnson | 37 | 15 | - | 1987: Oran "Juice" Jones, #45 R&B |
| 1969 | "Who's Loving You" | The Jackson 5 | | - | 1 | - | B-side of "I Want You Back" listed on R&B chart 1992: The Jackson 5, #48 R&B (live version); 2009: The Jackson 5, #36 UK (reissue); 2011: The Jackson 5, #83 UK (reissue) |
| 1969 | "Point It Out" | Smokey Robinson & the Miracles | Marv Tarplin, Al Cleveland | 37 | 4 | - | |
| 1970 | "The Tears of a Clown" | Smokey Robinson & the Miracles | Stevie Wonder, Hank Cosby | 1 | 1 | 1 | 1976: Smokey Robinson & the Miracles, #34 UK (reissue); 1979: The Beat, #6 UK |
| 1970 | "Still Water (Love)" | The Four Tops | Frank Wilson | 11 | 4 | 10 | 1982: O'Bryan, #23 R&B |
| 1971 | "I Don't Blame You At All" | Smokey Robinson & the Miracles | | 18 | 7 | 11 | |
| 1971 | "Crazy About the La La La" | Smokey Robinson & the Miracles | | 56 | 20 | - | |
| 1971 | "Satisfaction" | Smokey Robinson & the Miracles | | 49 | 20 | - | |
| 1972 | "Floy Joy" | The Supremes | | 16 | 5 | 9 | |
| 1972 | "Automatically Sunshine" | The Supremes | | 81 | 21 | 10 | |
| 1972 | "Your Wonderful, Sweet, Sweet Love" | The Supremes | | 59 | 22 | - | |
| 1973 | "Happy (Love Theme from Lady Sings the Blues)" | Bobby Darin | Michel Legrand | 67 | - | - | 1983: Michael Jackson, #52 UK |
| 1973 | "Sweet Harmony" | Smokey Robinson | | 48 | 31 | - | |
| 1973 | "Baby Come Close" | Smokey Robinson | Marv Tarplin, Pamela Young | 27 | 7 | - | |
| 1974 | "Just My Soul Responding" | Smokey Robinson | Marv Tarplin | - | - | 35 | |
| 1974 | "It's Her Turn to Live" | Smokey Robinson | Marv Tarplin | 82 | 29 | - | |
| 1974 | "Virgin Man" | Smokey Robinson | | 56 | 12 | - | |
| 1974 | "I Am, I Am" | Smokey Robinson | | 56 | 6 | - | |
| 1975 | "Baby That's Backatcha" | Smokey Robinson | | 26 | 1 | - | |
| 1975 | "The Agony and the Ecstasy " | Smokey Robinson | | 36 | 7 | - | |
| 1976 | "Quiet Storm" | Smokey Robinson | | 61 | 25 | - | 1999: Mobb Deep, #35 R&B |
| 1976 | "Open" | Smokey Robinson | Pamela Young, Marv Tarplin | 81 | 10 | - | |
| 1977 | "Theme from Big Time" | Smokey Robinson | | - | 38 | - | |
| 1978 | "Why You Wanna See My Bad Side" | Smokey Robinson | Janie Bradford | - | 52 | - | |
| 1978 | "Daylight and Darkness" | Smokey Robinson | Rose Ella Jones | 75 | 9 | - | |
| 1978 | "Shoe Soul'" | Smokey Robinson | Mike Sutton, Brenda Sutton | - | 68 | - | |
| 1979 | "Cruisin'" | Smokey Robinson | Marv Tarplin | 4 | 4 | - | 1995: D'Angelo, #53 US, #10 R&B, #31 UK; 2000: Huey Lewis & Gwyneth Paltrow, #109 US, #1 AC, #1 Australia, #1 New Zealand |
| 1980 | "Let Me Be the Clock" | Smokey Robinson | | 31 | 4 | - | |
| 1980 | "Heavy on Pride (Light on Love)" | Smokey Robinson | | - | 34 | - | |
| 1981 | "Being with You" | Smokey Robinson | | 2 | 1 | 1 | |
| 1981 | "You Are Forever" | Smokey Robinson | | 59 | 31 | 76 | |
| 1982 | "More on the Inside" | The Temptations | | - | 82 | - | |
| 1983 | "I've Made Love to You a Thousand Times" | Smokey Robinson | | - | 8 | - | |
| 1983 | "Touch the Sky" | Smokey Robinson | | - | 68 | - | |
| 1984 | "And I Don't Love You" | Smokey Robinson | | - | 33 | 90 | |
| 1984 | "I Can't Find" | Smokey Robinson | | - | 41 | - | |
| 1986 | "Hold On to Your Love" | Smokey Robinson | Stevie Wonder | - | 11 | 83 | |
| 1987 | "What's Too Much" | Smokey Robinson | Lonnie Kirtz, Ivory Stone, Homer Talbert | 79 | 16 | - | |
| 1988 | "Love Don't Give No Reason" | Smokey Robinson | Steve Tavani | - | 31 | 89 | |
| 1991 | "Double Good Everything" | Smokey Robinson | | 91 | 23 | - | |
| 1992 | "I Love Your Face" | Smokey Robinson | | - | 57 | - | |
| 1992 | "Rewind" | Smokey Robinson | | - | 56 | - | |
| 1999 | "Easy to Love" | Smokey Robinson | | - | 67 | - | |
