= The Miracles – Depend on Me: The Early Albums =

The Miracles – Depend On Me: The Early Albums

Compilation album by The Miracles
- Released: 2009
- Recorded: 1959–1963
- Genre: Soul music
- Label: Hip-O Select/Motown

The Miracles chronology
Smokey Robinson & the Miracles: Gold (2006)	The Miracles – Depend On Me: The Early Albums (2009)

The Miracles – Depend On Me: The Early Albums is a 2009 double-CD limited release by Motown Records' original vocal group The Miracles, released through Universal's Hip-O Select imprint to coincide with the legendary Motown label's 50th anniversary. In addition, this collection's release also coincided with The Miracles' being honored with a star on the Hollywood Walk of Fame on March 20 of that year.

This special two-CD release consists of the group's first five albums, in chronological order, three of which have never been issued on CD before: Hi... We're the Miracles (1961), Cookin' with The Miracles (1961), I'll Try Something New (1962-CD debut), The Fabulous Miracles (1963-CD debut), and The Miracles Recorded Live on Stage (1963-CD debut).

This collection also features a full color foldout, with the original front and rear covers of all five albums, complete with liner notes, and a 24-page booklet with photos and historical information on The Miracles with an essay by group chronicler Stu Hackel and commentary by Miracles Bobby Rogers, Pete Moore, Claudette Robinson, and Smokey Robinson, detailing their formation, the start of Motown Records, and their importance as Motown's first recording artists. The CD's cover photo features all six original group members: Smokey Robinson, his then-wife Claudette Robinson, her cousin Bobby Rogers, bass singer Pete Moore, baritone Ronnie White, and guitarist Marv Tarplin, taken during the 1961 photo sessions for their album, Cookin' with The Miracles.

This is the first new Miracles album released by Motown in decades where the group's original name/billing has been restored – i.e. "The Miracles" as opposed to "Smokey Robinson & The Miracles" (the group was billed under their collective name at the time these albums were originally released).

This collection also features several previously unreleased songs and bonus tracks, including two early regional releases of the group's first million-seller, "Shop Around", and the withdrawn 1959 single, "The Feeling Is So Fine". Hit songs in the collection include "I'll Try Something New", "What's So Good About Goodbye", "Shop Around", "Broken Hearted", "Mighty Good Lovin", "You've Really Got a Hold on Me","Happy Landing", "I've Been Good To You", "Who's Lovin' You", "Ain't It Baby", "Everybody's Gotta Pay Some Dues", "A Love She Can Count On", "Way Over There", and the title track, "(You Can) Depend on Me".

All tracks have been remastered for this release.

== Disc One ==
=== Hi, We're The Miracles ===
1. "Who's Lovin' You"
2. "(You Can) Depend on Me"
3. "A Heart Like Mine"
4. "Shop Around"
5. "Won't You Take Me Back"
6. "'Cause I Love You"
7. "Your Love"
8. "After All"
9. "Way Over There"
10. "Money"
11. "Don't Leave Me"

=== Cookin' with The Miracles ===
1. "That's The Way I Feel"
2. "Everybody's Gotta Pay Some Dues"
3. "Mama"
4. "Ain't It Baby"
5. "Determination"
6. "You Never Miss A Good Thing"
7. "Embraceable You"
8. "The Only One I Love"
9. "Broken Hearted"
10. "I Can't Believe"

Non-LP Singles

1. "Mighty Good Lovin'"
2. "The Feeling Is So Fine"
3. "Shop Around (regional version 2)"

=== I'll Try Something New ===
Side A

1. "I'll Try Something New"
2. "What's So Good About Goodbye"
3. "He Don't Care About Me"
4. "A Love That Can Never Be"
5. "I've Been Good To You"

== Disc Two ==
=== I'll Try Something New ===
Side B

1. "Speak Low"
2. "On the Street Where You Live"
3. "If Your Mother Only Knew"
4. "I've Got You Under My Skin"
5. "This I Swear, I Promise"

=== The Fabulous Miracles ===
1. "You've Really Got a Hold on Me" (Smokey Robinson)
2. "I've Been Good To You" (Robinson)
3. "Such is Love, Such is Life" (Robinson)
4. "I Can Take a Hint" (Robinson, Janie Bradford, Stanley Ossman, Robert Rogers)
5. "Won't You Take Me Back" (Robinson)
6. "A Love She Can Count On" (Robinson)
7. "Whatever Makes You Happy" (Robinson, Ronald White)
8. "Heartbreak Road" (Robinson, White)
9. "Happy Landing" (Robinson, White)
10. "Your Love" (Robinson)

=== The Miracles Recorded Live on Stage ===
1. "Mighty Good Lovin'"
2. "A Love She Can Count On"
3. "Happy Landing"
4. "I've Been Good To You"
5. "What's So Good About Goodbye"
6. "You've Really Got A Hold On Me"
7. "Way Over There"

Bonus tracks

1. Shop Around (regional version 1 )
2. The Only One I Love (single version)

== Personnel ==
=== The Miracles ===
- Smokey Robinson – lead and background vocals
- Claudette Robinson – lead and background vocals
- Bobby Rogers – lead and background vocals
- Pete Moore – background vocals, vocal arrangements
- Ronnie White – lead and background vocals
- Marv Tarplin – guitar
