= The Miracles Sing Modern =

Unreleased 1963 Album by The Miracles Tamla T234

The Miracles Sing Modern was an unreleased 1963 album by Motown Records R&B group The Miracles. It was given the official catalog number of Tamla T234 and was due for release after The Miracles' 3rd album I'll Try Something New, having been mentioned on the sleeve notes of that album. It was intended for release in March 1963. However it was never given an official release date and Motown later decided to shelve the project.

This album was to feature a combination of new tunes along with standards, with the intention of showcasing the Miracles' talent and versatility on different genres of music and the ability of different group members to sing lead vocals in addition to main lead singer Bill "Smokey" Robinson. Cousins Bobby Rogers and Claudette Rogers Robinson shared lead vocals on the standard Easy Street and Claudette leads alone on Mister Misery "My Heart Says Yes", and Father Dear. Husband-and-Wife Smokey and Claudette Robinson share the lead chores on the standard "If I Were a Bell" (from the 1950 musical Guys and Dolls) joined in mid-song by Miracles Bobby Rogers, Pete Moore, and Ronnie White in an ensemble lead. Some songs showcase all of the Miracles singing five-part harmony.

An official front and rear cover was mocked up and this proposed cover was recently released onto the internet. In a transitional period for the group's line-up, bass singer/vocal arranger Pete Moore was featured on the front cover and Marv Tarplin was on the rear cover - Moore not having been available as he had been recently been drafted into the U.S. Armed Services at the time the photo was taken. (Both Moore and Tarplin had been featured on the covers of the group's previous album covers Cookin' with the Miracles and I'll Try Something New.) Though not released, this album was actually included on the list of albums the group recorded on "The Miracles' Album Discography" in the liner notes of the Miracles' 35th Anniversary 4 CD box set.

Although this album was never released in its original form, all of its tunes were subsequently released on later Miracles albums and CD compilations including, but not limited to, "Smokey Robinson & The Miracles: Lost & Found: Along Came Love (1958-1964) (released 1999), The Miracles – Depend on Me: The Early Albums (2009), and the Smokey Robinson & The Miracles-The 35th Anniversary Collection box set (1994).

== Personnel ==
=== The Miracles ===
- William "Smokey" Robinson - lead and background vocals
- Claudette Rogers Robinson - lead and background vocals
- Bobby Rogers - lead and background vocals
- Warren "Pete" Moore - bass vocals and vocal arrangements
- Ronnie White - baritone vocals
- Marv Tarplin - guitar
