= The Fabulous Miracles =

Studio album by the Miracles
- Released: February 28, 1963
- Recorded: Hitsville USA, Detroit
- Genre: Soul
- Label: Tamla
- Producer: Smokey Robinson; Berry Gordy, Jr.

The Miracles chronology
I'll Try Something New (1962)	The Fabulous Miracles (1963)	The Miracles Recorded Live on Stage (1963)

Singles from The Fabulous Miracles
- 1. "Happy Landing" / "You've Really Got a Hold on Me" Released: November 9, 1962; 2. "A Love She Can Count On" Released: March 11, 1963

Professional ratings
Review scores
Source	Rating
AllMusic	3/5 stars

The Fabulous Miracles is the fourth studio album by the American R&B group the Miracles. It was released on February 28, 1963, on Motown's Tamla label. The album features the million-selling hit "You've Really Got a Hold on Me", one of the group's most popular singles, and the chart hits "A Love She Can Count On" and "I've Been Good To You", which the Beatles' John Lennon has identified as his favorite Miracles song. Miracles lead singer Smokey Robinson was the principal writer on all tracks, while Miracles members Ronnie White and Bobby Rogers co-wrote with him on several of the album's songs. Although two of the album’s songs, "Won’t You Take Me Back" and "Your Love", were taken from their debut album Hi... We're the Miracles, all eight new songs were released as either singles or B-sides.

The album also features "I Can Take a Hint", which charted on the Billboard pop & R&B listings after being issued as the B-side of "A Love She Can Count On".

"Happy Landing", the flip side of "You Really Got a Hold On Me", while never charting nationally, did become a hit on several regional charts, and was performed by the group on their first live album, The Miracles Recorded Live on Stage. It was also the original A-side of “You've Really Got A Hold On Me”, but fell into obscurity as the nation's disc jockeys discovered and played the record's more successful flip side. The Fabulous Miracles is only one of three Miracles albums to feature Miracles guitarist and original group member Marv Tarplin on its cover. The Miracles' bass singer Pete Moore is not featured on the album or the cover, as he was serving in the U.S. Armed Services and was stationed in Germany at the time this album was recorded (Moore is shown in a separate photograph on the back cover). While Tarplin remained a member of the Miracles through 1973, he was not featured on any more of the group's classic album covers, except for 1961's Cookin' with The Miracles, 1962's I'll Try Something New, and this album. Tarplin does, however, appear on the cover of the group's 2009 Motown CD release, The Miracles – Depend On Me: The Early Albums.

== Release ==
The Fabulous Miracles and, in particular, the album version of "A Love She Can Count On," was released on CD as part of the 2009 Motown limited edition CD release "The Miracles – Depend On Me: The Early Albums."

== Track listing ==
All songs written by Smokey Robinson, except where noted.

Side one:

1. "You've Really Got a Hold on Me" – 2:58
2. "I've Been Good to You" – 2:42 (Previously appeared on I'll Try Something New)
3. "Such Is Love, Such Is Life" – 2:42
4. "I Can Take a Hint" (Robinson, Janie Bradford, Stanley Ossman, Bobby Rogers) – 2:45
5. "Won't You Take Me Back" – 2:39 (previously appeared on Hi... We're The Miracles)

Side two:

1. "A Love She Can Count On" – 2:52 (different version than the single)
2. "Whatever Makes You Happy" (Robinson, Ronald White) – 2:33
3. "Heartbreak Road" (Robinson, White) – 2:46
4. "Happy Landing" (Robinson, White) – 2:46
5. "Your Love" – 2:50 (previously appeared on Hi... We're The Miracles)

== Personnel ==
=== The Miracles ===
- Smokey Robinson - lead vocals, producer, executive producer
- Ronnie White - background vocals
- Bobby Rogers - background vocals (co-lead on "You Really Got a Hold on Me")
- Warren "Pete" Moore - background vocals
- Claudette Robinson - background vocals
- Marv Tarplin - guitar

=== Other credits ===
- The Funk Brothers - instrumentation
