= Happy Landing (song) =

- Dutch release picture sleeve

Single by the Miracles

from the album The Fabulous Miracles
- B-side: "You've Really Got a Hold on Me"
- Released: November 9, 1962
- Recorded: October 16, 1962
- Studio: Hitsville USA, Detroit
- Genre: Rhythm and blues
- Length: 2:46
- Label: Tamla
- Songwriters: Smokey Robinson, Ronald White
- Producer: "Smokey".

The Miracles singles chronology
"I'll Try Something New" (1962)	"Happy Landing" (1962)	"A Love She Can Count On" (1963)

"Happy Landing" is a 1962 R&B recording by Motown Records singing group the Miracles, issued on that label's Tamla Records subsidiary label (T54073). It was recorded in November 1962, and appeared on their album The Fabulous Miracles. The group also recorded a live version of this song on their first live album, 1963's The Miracles Recorded Live on Stage.

== Originally an "A" Side ==
Written by Miracles members Smokey Robinson and Ronnie White, Happy Landing was originally conceived as the "A" side of Tamla 54073, and was the first single issued from the album The Fabulous Miracles. This song was popular in many regions of the country, but was not charting nationally, because American disc jockeys, preferred and played the "B" side, You've Really Got a Hold on Me, which went on to become one of The Miracles' most successful songs, their second million-seller (after Shop Around), and a 1998 Grammy Hall of Fame inductee.

The song, in addition to being on the aforementioned Miracles' albums, also appears on the group's 4-CD box-set 35th Anniversary Collection and on their 2-CD set, The Miracles – Depend On Me: The Early Albums. It has inspired a cover version by The Temptations.

== Personnel ==
=== The Miracles ===
- Smokey Robinson - lead vocals, co-writer, producer
- Bobby Rogers - background vocals
- Pete Moore - (absent due to military service)
- Claudette Robinson - background vocals
- Ronnie White - background vocals, co-writer
- Marv Tarplin - guitar

== Additional instruments ==
- The Funk Brothers
