= Christmas with The Miracles =

Studio album by the Miracles
- Released: October 29, 1963
- Studios: Hitsville USA, Detroit
- Genre: Soul
- Label: Tamla
- Producer: Ronald White

The Miracles chronology
The Miracles Recorded Live on Stage (1963)	Christmas with The Miracles (1963)	The Miracles Doin' Mickey's Monkey (1963)

Singles from Christmas with the Miracles
- 1. "The Christmas Song (promo only)" Released: November 1963

Professional ratings
Review scores
Source	Rating
Allmusic	link

Christmas with The Miracles is the fifth studio album by the American R&B group the Miracles. It was released on October 29, 1963, on Motown's Tamla label. The album charted for six weeks, peaking at number 15 on Billboard's Christmas Record album chart on December 11, 1965. It features traditional Christmas songs, with one Smokey Robinson original, "Christmas Everyday". The album was produced by Miracles member Ronnie White. Miracle Pete Moore was serving in the U.S. Armed Services at the time the cover photograph was taken, and was not on the cover photograph, nor was Miracle Marv Tarplin.

== Track listing ==
All lead vocals by Smokey Robinson, except where noted.

Side One

1. "Santa Claus Is Coming to Town" (J. Fred Coots, Haven Gillespie) – 1:52
2. "Let It Snow" (Sammy Cahn, Jule Styne) – 1:39 (lead: Claudette Robinson)
3. "Winter Wonderland" (Felix Bernard, Richard B. Smith) – 2:18 (Lead: group)
4. "Christmas Everyday" (Smokey Robinson) – 2:27 (lead: Smokey Robinson with Bobby Rogers)
5. "I'll Be Home for Christmas" (Walter Kent, Kim Gannon) – 2:25 (lead: Ronnie White)

Side Two

1. "The Christmas Song" (Mel Tormé, Bob Wells) – 2:37
2. "White Christmas" (Irving Berlin) – 3:04 (lead: Ronnie White with Smokey Robinson)
3. "Silver Bells" (Jay Livingston, Ray Evans) – 2:00
4. "Noel" (Traditional) – 2:28
5. "O Holy Night" (Adolphe Adam) – 2:10

This album was mastered for compact disc by John Matousek at Motown/Hitsville U.S.A. Recording Studios, Hollywood, California, and was released on CD in 1987.

== Personnel ==
- Smokey Robinson – lead vocals
- Ronnie White, Bobby Rogers, Warren "Pete" Moore, Claudette Robinson – background vocals
- Marv Tarplin – guitar
- The Funk Brothers – instrumentation
- Ronald White, producer
