= The Miracles Recorded Live on Stage =

Live album by the Miracles
- Released: May 31, 1963
- Genre: Soul
- Length: 27:42
- Label: Tamla
- Producer: Berry Gordy Jr.

The Miracles chronology
The Fabulous Miracles (1963)	The Miracles Recorded Live on Stage (1963)	Christmas with The Miracles (1963)

The Miracles Recorded Live on Stage is the first live album by the American R&B group the Miracles. It was released on May 31, 1963, on Motown's Tamla label as part of the early 1960s "Live on Stage" series by various artists. The first of three live albums the group released during their career, it features R&B numbers recorded at the Apollo Theater in New York and The Regal Theatre in Chicago, Illinois during their 1962 and 1963 tour. As noted in album's liner notes, only four of the six Miracles performed on this tour: Smokey Robinson, Bobby Rogers, Ronnie White, and Claudette Robinson. Miracles member Pete Moore was serving in the US Army at the time of these performances, and Marv Tarplin had taken a leave of absence. The setlist focused on their most recent studio album, with four of the seven songs coming from The Fabulous Miracles. The opener "Mighty Good Lovin'" was selected for various later compilations, while "I've Been Good To You" later appeared in a stereo mix on the 2002 compilation Ooo Baby Baby: The Anthology.

Despite the shorter track listing, The Miracles Recorded Live on Stage is longer than any of the Miracles' studio albums at the time of release, with the exception of Hi... We're the Miracles. This was because the songs were extended with vocal solos, spoken word sections, and audience participation. "A Love She Can Count On" and "Happy Landing", in particular, are nearly twice as long as their studio renditions.

The Miracles: Recorded Live On Stage was released on CD as part of the 2009 Motown limited edition CD release The Miracles – Depend on Me: The Early Albums.

== Reception ==
Professional ratings
Review scores
Source	Rating
Allmusic	3/5 stars
Dusty Groove America	(no rating)

Fred Thomas's brief retrospective review for Allmusic called The Miracles Recorded Live on Stage a "brief but explosive live document". While he acknowledged that the Miracles already had a few hits at the time of recording, he felt the sound effectively captured the Miracles as simply a hot and exciting live act, before they became legends.

== Track listing ==
All songs written by Smokey Robinson, except where noted.

Side one - recorded at The Regal Theatre in Chicago, Illinois, 1963

1. "Mighty Good Lovin'" – 2:37
2. "A Love She Can Count On" – 5:42
3. "Happy Landing" (Robinson, Ronnie White) – 5:26

Side two - recorded at the Apollo Theatre in New York, December 17, 1962

4. "I've Been Good To You" – 4:07
  - Includes an excerpt from "You'll Lose a Good Thing" (Barbara Lynn Ozen), which does not appear in the track listing but is listed in the publisher notes
5. "What's So Good About Goodbye" – 2:21
6. "You've Really Got A Hold On Me" – 4:51
  - Includes an excerpt from "Bring It On Home to Me" (Sam Cooke), which does not appear in the track listing but is listed in the publisher notes
7. "Way Over There" – 2:38

== Personnel ==
The Miracles

- Smokey Robinson & Bobby Rogers ("You've Really Got A Hold On Me"): lead vocals
- Ronnie White, Bobby Rogers, Claudette Robinson: background vocals

Other personnel

- Berry Gordy Jr., producer
