= Way Over There =

Single by the Miracles

from the album Hi... We're the Miracles
- B-side: "(You Can) Depend on Me"; "If Your Mother Only Knew" (Re-Issue)
- Released: February 22, 1960 (1st Ver.); March 21, 1960 (2nd Ver.); April 4, 1960 (3rd Ver.); August 17, 1962 (Re-Issue)
- Recorded: 1959–1960
- Genre: Soul
- Length: 3:00
- Label: Tamla
- Songwriter: Smokey Robinson
- Producer: Berry Gordy, Jr.

The Miracles singles chronology
"The Feeling Is So Fine" (1959)	"Way Over There" (1960)	"Shop Around" (1960)

"Way Over There" is a 1960 Motown soul song and single written by William "Smokey" Robinson, (Note: Hi... We're the Miracles credits "Way Over There" as written by Berry Gordy, Jr. and Robinson, but the original single release credits Robinson alone. Later releases, such as The Miracles Recorded Live on Stage and The Miracles – Depend on Me: The Early Albums, also credit only Robinson.) produced by Berry Gordy, and first performed by the Miracles for the Tamla (Motown) label. It was one of The Miracles' earliest charting singles, reaching #94 on the Billboard Pop chart. Motown president Berry Gordy, Jr. had The Miracles record the song twice during its chart run. The first version had minimal orchestration. The second version added strings, and this is the version played by most oldies stations. The lyrics are about the narrator's long-distance relationship with a "lover way over there on the mountainside". This song uses female backing vocals (performed by Claudette Robinson on the Miracles' studio version and by the concert audience on the album The Miracles Recorded Live on Stage) to answer the lead singer with chants of "Come to me, baby". The song's B-side, "(You Can) Depend on Me", while not charting nationally, did become a popular regional hit in many areas of the country, and Smokey sang it in his solo shows.

"Way Over There" was subsequently recorded by Edwin Starr, The Temptations, The Marvelettes, The Royal Counts, The Spitballs, and Eddie Adams Jr, while "(You Can) Depend on Me" was later recorded by The Temptations, The Supremes, Mary Wells, and Brenda Holloway. The song was also used for the title of Hip-O Select's 2009 compilation The Miracles – Depend on Me: The Early Albums, which collects the first five LP releases by the group.

== Personnel ==
The Miracles

- Smokey Robinson – lead vocals
- Bobby Rogers – backing vocals
- Pete Moore – backing vocals
- Claudette Robinson – backing vocals
- Ronnie White – backing vocals
- Marv Tarplin – guitar

Additional instruments

- The Funk Brothers
- The Detroit Symphony Orchestra (later version)
- Various Chicago area musicians (later version)
