= I'll Try Something New =

Studio album by the Miracles
- Released: July 1962
- Studios: Hitsville USA, Detroit
- Genre: Soul
- Length: 26:04
- Label: Tamla
- Producers: Berry Gordy, Jr. Smokey Robinson

The Miracles chronology
Cookin' with the Miracles (1961)	I'll Try Something New (1962)	The Fabulous Miracles (1963)

Singles from I'll Try Something New
- 1. "What's So Good About Goodbye" Released: December 14, 1961; 2. "I'll Try Something New" Released: April 9, 1962

Professional ratings
Review scores
Source	Rating
Allmusic	4/5 stars

I'll Try Something New is the third studio album by the American R&B group the Miracles. It was released in July 1962 on Motown's Tamla label, and as suggested by its title, it saw the group experimenting with a wide variety of pop and soul styles. Like their previous album, Cookin' with the Miracles, it failed to produce a hit comparable to their million-selling "Shop Around", with both of the included singles ("I'll Try Something New" and "What's So Good About Goodbye") just barely cracking the Billboard Top 40. Nonetheless, the title track was an important early single for the group, featuring Smokey Robinson's lead voice, a chorus led by his wife Claudette and an orchestra of strings. Unusual for a Miracles album recorded during Smokey Robinson's tenure, fully half of the songs feature other members of the group on lead vocals.

The original plan for The Miracles' third album was a collection of covers of show tunes, with the planned title The Miracles Sing Modern. According to Miracle Pete Moore, the group thought the songs did not fit their style but were unwilling to go against Berry Gordy, Jr.'s orders. The Miracles Sing Modern was ultimately left unfinished, but three show tunes recorded for it were included on I'll Try Something New: "I've Got You Under My Skin" from the musical film Born to Dance, "On the Street Where You Live" from the Broadway musical My Fair Lady, and "Speak Low" from the Broadway musical One Touch of Venus.

This album is one of the few Miracles albums to feature the complete original six-member group lineup on its cover: Marv Tarplin, Claudette Rogers Robinson, Smokey Robinson, Bobby Rogers, Ronnie White, and Pete Moore.

== Release ==
I'll Try Something New was released as a digital download through the iTunes Store. I'll Try Something New and four other Miracles albums were released on CD as part of the 2009 Motown 50th Anniversary limited edition CD release The Miracles – Depend On Me: The Early Albums.

In 2013 I'll Try Something New was given a standalone CD release.

== Track listing ==
Side one
No.	Title	Writer(s)	Lead vocals	Length
1.	"I'll Try Something New"	William "Smokey" Robinson	Smokey Robinson	2:37
2.	"What's So Good About Goodbye"	Robinson	Smokey Robinson	2:20
3.	"He Don't Care About Me"	Robinson	Claudette Robinson	2:14
4.	"A Love That Can Never Be"	Robert Bateman, Janie Bradford, Richard Wylie	Ronnie White	2:45
5.	"I've Been Good to You"	Robinson	Smokey Robinson	2:39

Side two
No.	Title	Writer(s)	Lead vocals	Length
6.	"Speak Low"	Ogden Nash, Kurt Weill	Smokey and Claudette Robinson	2:54
7.	"On the Street Where You Live"	Frederick Loewe, Alan Jay Lerner	Claudette Robinson, Ronnie White, Smokey Robinson, Bobby Rogers, and Pete Moore	3:30
8.	"If Your Mother Only Knew"	Robinson, William "Mickey" Stevenson	Smokey Robinson	2:40
9.	"I've Got You Under My Skin"	Cole Porter	Smokey Robinson, Claudette Robinson, Ronnie White, Bobby Rogers, and Pete Moore	2:00
10.	"This I Swear, I Promise"	Robinson, Bradford	Smokey Robinson	2:25

== Personnel ==
=== The Miracles ===
- Smokey Robinson, Ronnie White, Claudette Robinson, Bobby Rogers, Warren "Pete" Moore – vocals
- Marv Tarplin – guitar

=== Other musicians ===
- The Funk Brothers – instrumentation

=== Producers ===
- Berry Gordy, Jr., producer
- Smokey Robinson, producer
