= Everybody's Gotta Pay Some Dues =

Single by The Miracles

from the album Cookin' with The Miracles
- B-side: "I Can't Believe"
- Released: September 1961
- Recorded: RCA Victor Studios, Chicago, Illinois Summer/Autumn 1961
- Genre: Soul/pop
- Length: 2:23
- Label: Tamla
- Songwriters: Smokey Robinson, Ronnie White
- Producer: Berry Gordy, Jr.

The Miracles singles chronology
"Mighty Good Lovin'/Broken Hearted" (1961)	"Everybody's Gotta Pay Some Dues" (1961)	"What's So Good About Goodbye" (1961)

"Everybody's Gotta Pay Some Dues" was a 1961 R&B song by Motown Records group The Miracles, written by Miracles members Smokey Robinson and Ronnie White, with Robinson providing the lead vocal. It was released on the label's Tamla Records subsidiary and entered the Billboard Pop and R&B listings that year, reaching #52 and #11 respectively. It was later included on Cookin' with The Miracles, the Miracles' second album.

Similar to the group's first million-selling hit single, "Shop Around", this song is an advice record, but it failed to replicate "Shop Around"'s success, becoming the last in a string of underperforming singles from the Miracles before their comeback hit "What's So Good About Goodbye", which recycled the chord changes from "Dues". Whereas on "Shop Around" the song's narrator received advice from his mama, who told him "You better shop around", this time it is the narrator who is giving advice to his own son, telling him about the trials and errors in the search to find true love in the intro. This middle-aged perspective seemed to go against Motown's slogan "The Sound of Young America". The backing harmonies punctuate Smokey Robinson's vocals on the chorus and elsewhere, using classic call and response vocals on the bridge. The song is laden with heavy strings throughout.

This song was arranged by famed Chicago-based conductor/arranger Riley C. Hampton. This was the first time an outside arranger was employed on a Motown release.

"Everybody's Got to Pay Some Dues" was covered by fellow Motown artist, Marv Johnson, in 1967.

== Personnel ==
The Miracles

- Smokey Robinson
- Claudette Robinson
- Bobby Rogers
- Pete Moore
- Ronnie White
- Marv Tarplin
