= What's So Good About Goodbye =

Single by The Miracles

from the album I'll Try Something New
- B-side: "I've Been Good To You"
- Released: December 14, 1961
- Recorded: RCA Victor Studios, Chicago, Illinois October 14, 1961
- Genre: Soul/pop
- Length: 2:23
- Label: Tamla
- Songwriter: Smokey Robinson
- Producer: Berry Gordy Jr.

The Miracles singles chronology
"Everybody's Gotta Pay Some Dues" (1961)	"What's So Good About Goodbye" (1961)	"I'll Try Something New" (1962)

"What's So Good About Goodbye" was a 1961 hit single recorded by R&B group The Miracles for Motown Records' Tamla label, later included on their 1962 album I'll Try Something New. The single was the Miracles' second Top 40 Pop hit, peaking at number 35 on the Billboard Hot 100 in the United States during the winter of 1962, and a Top 20 R&B hit as well, peaking at number 16 on Billboard's R&B singles chart.

== Background ==
"What's So Good About Goodbye" was written by Miracles lead singer Smokey Robinson. The chord changes were recycled from the Miracles' previous single "Everybody's Gotta Pay Some Dues", which was released less than three months earlier. The Miracles were a major influence on The Beatles, and their song "Ask Me Why" used the opening guitar phrase from "What's So Good About Goodbye". Its B-side, "I've Been Good To You", appeared on Bubbling Under Hot 100 at number 103 in the U.S., but never made it to the Billboard Hot 100. Both songs were performed on the group's first live album, The Miracles Recorded Live on Stage.

== Personnel ==
- Smokey Robinson - lead vocals
- Claudette Rogers Robinson - background vocals
- Pete Moore - background vocals
- Ronnie White - background vocals
- Bobby Rogers - background vocals
- Marv Tarplin - guitar
- The Funk Brothers - instrumentation

== Chart performance ==
Chart (1962)	Peak position
US Billboard Hot 100	35
US Billboard Hot R&B Sides	16

== Cover versions ==
"What's So Good About Goodbye" was covered by:

- The Temptations, who included it on their 1965 album The Temptations Sing Smokey.
- The Jackson 5 (Unreleased from 1969)
- Rock band Quix*o*tic
- Canadian group Giant Sunflower.
