= A Love She Can Count On =

- Dutch release picture sleeve

Single by the Miracles

from the album The Fabulous Miracles
- B-side: "I Can Take A Hint"
- Released: March 11, 1963
- Recorded: February 13, 1963
- Studio: Hitsville USA (Studio A), Detroit, Michigan
- Genre: Soul
- Length: 2:39
- Label: Tamla
- Songwriter: Smokey Robinson
- Producer: Smokey Robinson

The Miracles singles chronology
"You've Really Got a Hold on Me" (1962)	"A Love She Can Count On" (1963)	"Mickey's Monkey" (1963)

"A Love She Can Count On" is a 1963 hit single by Motown Records R&B group the Miracles, issued on that label's Tamla subsidiary label. It was taken from their album The Fabulous Miracles, and was the follow-up to the group's million-selling Grammy Hall of Fame inducted tune, "You've Really Got A Hold On Me". The first of three singles released by The Miracles that year, this song was a Billboard Top 40 Pop Hit, peaking at number 31, and missed the Top 20 of its R&B chart by only one position, peaking at number 21.

Written and produced by Miracles lead singer Smokey Robinson, "A Love She Can Count On" features the same bluesy sound and feel of "Hold On Me", featuring the gospel-inspired harmonies of Miracles members Bobby Rogers, Claudette Robinson, Pete Moore, and Ronnie White, and, like that previous song, begins with the guitar of Miracles member Marv Tarplin. However, that is where the similarities end; unlike the previous hit, with its theme of being in love with someone you don't like, "A Love She Can Count On" has as its theme undying love and loyalty, with Robinson, as the song's narrator, promising eternal love and devotion:

Every day ...
I'm gonna love you, come what may
'Cause I know that there is nothing that means more
To a woman,
than a love that she can count on

The other Miracles participate in a sing-along call and response with Smokey on the song's bridge, similar to the song that, according to Smokey, inspired both this song and "Hold On Me", Sam Cooke's 1962 hit "Bring It On Home to Me". The single and album versions of this song are noticeably different, the album version of "A Love She Can Count On" featuring a bluesy piano style as was done by its predecessor "You've Really Got A Hold On Me". For the most part the piano was deleted from the single version, not being featured as prominently. It also features a completely different vocal take.

Cash Box described it as "a pulsating, shuffle beat ballad romancer that the songsters carve out in groovy style."

Unlike almost all other singles from The Miracles, and indeed many other songs by the group, "A Love She Can Count On" has not yet been covered by major acts. This was also the case with the B-side of the single, "I Can Take A Hint", despite the fact that it was also a chart hit, reaching number 107 on the Billboard Pop chart.

"A Love She Can Count On" appears on several Miracles "Greatest Hits" collections, including their album Greatest Hits from the Beginning, and their 2009 two-CD set, The Miracles–Depend On Me: The Early Albums (which features both live and studio versions). The Miracles also performed a special extended version of the song on their first live album, 1963's The Miracles Recorded Live on Stage. This song was also given an extended stereo remix in 2002 for the compilation Ooo Baby Baby: The Anthology.

== Personnel ==
- Lead vocals by Smokey Robinson
- Background vocals by Claudette Rogers Robinson, Warren "Pete" Moore, Bobby Rogers and Ronnie White
- Guitar by Marv Tarplin
- Other instrumentation by The Funk Brothers
