= I've Been Good to You =

1961 single by The Miracles

Single by the Miracles

from the album I'll Try Something New & The Fabulous Miracles
- A-side: "What's So Good About Goodbye"
- Released: December 14, 1961
- Recorded: October 14 and 29, 1961
- Studio: Hitsville USA, Detroit
- Length: 3:00
- Label: Tamla
- Songwriter(s): Smokey Robinson
- Producer(s): Berry Gordy Jr.

The Miracles singles chronology
"Everybody's Gotta Pay Some Dues" (1961)	"What's So Good About Goodbye" / "I've Been Good to You" (1961)	"I'll Try Something New" (1962)

"I've Been Good to You"

Single by the Temptations

from the album Gettin' Ready
- A-side: "You're My Everything"
- Released: June 13, 1967
- Studio: Hitsville USA, Detroit
- Genre: Soul
- Length: 3:00
- Label: Gordy
- Songwriter(s): Smokey Robinson
- Producer(s): Smokey Robinson

The Temptations singles chronology
"All I Need" / "Sorry is a Sorry Word" (1967)	"You're My Everything" / "I've Been Good to You" (1967)	"(Loneliness Made Me Realize) It's You That I Need" (1967)

"I've Been Good to You" is a 1961 R&B song by the Miracles on Motown Records' Tamla label. It was released as the B-side of their Billboard Top 40 hit, "What's So Good About Goodbye", and was included on their album I'll Try Something New the following year. This sad, melancholy ballad charted #103 on the Billboard Pop chart. Despite its relatively modest chart placing, this song has been hugely influential, and is noted as Beatle John Lennon's favorite Miracles tune, and was the inspiration for the Beatles' songs "This Boy" and "Sexy Sadie". Written by Miracles lead singer Smokey Robinson, the song begins with the lyric, "Look what you've done...You've made a fool out of someone..." which Lennon later paraphrased in "Sexy Sadie" song as, "What have you done...You've made a fool of everyone."

The song was performed live by the group on their album, The Miracles Recorded Live on Stage, and has inspired cover versions by Marshall Crenshaw, Joe Meek, The Temptones, Ray, Goodman & Brown (The Moments), The Ones, and fellow Motown artists, Brenda Holloway, and The Temptations. The Temptations' version would also be released as a "B" side and would chart at #124 on the Pop charts in 1967 (as well be released on their 1966 album Gettin' Ready). In addition to being on their first Live album, The Miracles' original version of "I've Been Good to You" actually appears on two other of their early 1960s albums; 1962's I'll Try Something New, and 1963's The Fabulous Miracles.
