= Hi... We're the Miracles =

Studio album by the Miracles
- Released: January 1961
- Genre: Soul
- Length: 32:57
- Label: Tamla
- Producer: Berry Gordy, Jr.

The Miracles chronology
Hi... We're the Miracles (1961)	Cookin' with the Miracles (1961)

Singles from Hi... We're The Miracles
- 1. "Way Over There" Released: February 22, 1960; 2. "Shop Around" Released: September 27, 1960 (regional), October 15, 1960 (national); 3. "Who's Lovin' You" Released: September 27, 1960

Hi... We're the Miracles is the debut studio album by the American R&B group the Miracles. It was released in January 1961 on Motown's Tamla label. The album features several songs that played an important role in defining The Motown Sound and establishing songwriters Smokey Robinson and Berry Gordy.

The styles of the album tracks vary from the late doo-wop sound of "Who's Lovin' You" (later recorded by The Temptations, the Jackson 5, Terence Trent D'Arby, and En Vogue) and "(You Can) Depend on Me", to the upbeat R&B of "Way Over There". Though nearly all of the tracks are Miracles originals, also featured is a rendition of Motown's first hit single, Barrett Strong's "Money (That's What I Want)", the first of a vast number of covers of Motown songs by Motown artists. Smokey Robinson, the Miracles' lead singer, wrote or co-wrote (with either producer Berry Gordy or fellow Miracle Ronnie White) all the remaining songs. The album's biggest hit was the bluesy "Shop Around", which was released as a single in 1960 and peaked at number 1 on the Billboard R&B singles chart and number 2 on the pop singles chart (No. 1 Pop, Cashbox). "Shop Around" was the first R&B number 1 single for both the Miracles and Motown label. It was also the label's first million-selling hit single and a 2006 Grammy Hall of Fame-inducted song.

Hi... We're the Miracles features the Miracles' classic original lineup (not to be confused with their true original lineup): Smokey Robinson, Ronnie White, Bobby Rogers, Pete Moore, Marv Tarplin (mentioned on the back of the album, though not pictured on the front), and Robinson's then-wife (and Rogers's cousin), Claudette Rogers Robinson.

== Background and recording ==
Motown had very little finances at the time of the sessions, and so could not provide the Miracles with much in the way of facilities or instrumentation, resulting in Hi... We're the Miracles having a much rougher, stripped-down sound than their later albums. Having only access to two-track recording, the performers had to all record together, meaning that if even one person made a mistake, whether it be a singer or an instrumentalist, everyone would have to start over. As a result, recording a song took a long while, even with the Miracles having extensively rehearsed their songs ahead of time.

Claudette Robinson was extremely shy about singing lead, and recalled that during the recording of "After All", "I had my back to the engineer and I was standing in a corner trying to cover up. As I listen to those records, I keep thinking I really could have done it better. My whole heart wasn't in it because I was scared."

== Release ==
Hi... We're the Miracles was released on CD by Motown Records in the early 1990s.

Hi... We're the Miracles and four other Miracles albums were re-released as part of the 2009 Motown 50th anniversary limited edition CD release The Miracles-Depend On Me: The Early Albums.

== Reception ==
Professional ratings
Review scores
Source	Rating
Allmusic	4.5/5 stars

In a retrospective review, Bruce Eder of Allmusic called Hi... We're the Miracles "a magnificent debut, filled with impeccable vocal performances, inventive and occasionally brilliant songwriting, and an aching romantic aura." He said that all the songs on the album are "winners", yet even in that company the tracks "Heart Like Mine", "Shop Around", and "Way Over There" stand out as highlights. He concluded the album to be essential even for casual listeners.

== Track listing ==
=== Side one ===
1. "Who's Lovin' You" (Smokey Robinson) – 3:06
2. "Depend on Me" (Robinson, Berry Gordy) – 3:08
3. "Heart Like Mine" (Ronnie White, Robinson) – 2:06
4. "Shop Around" (Robinson, Gordy) – 2:50
5. "Won't You Take Me Back" (Robinson) (Note: There are conflicting writing credits for "Won't You Take Me Back". The album sleeve credits Robinson and Gordy, the album label credits Robinson and White, and the later release The Miracles – Depend on Me: The Early Albums credits Robinson alone.) – 2:40
6. "Cause I Love You" (White, Robinson) – 2:25

=== Side two ===
1. "Your Love" (Robinson) – 2:51
2. "After All" (Robinson) – 2:47
3. "Way Over There" (Robinson) (Note: Hi... We're the Miracles credits "Way Over There" as written by Berry Gordy, Jr. and Robinson, but the original single release credits Robinson alone. Later releases, such as The Miracles Recorded Live on Stage and The Miracles – Depend on Me: The Early Albums, also credit only Robinson.) – 2:57
4. "Money" (Gordy, Janie Bradford) – 3:48
5. "Don't Leave Me" (Robinson, Gordy, Brian Holland, Robert Bateman) (Note: Holland and Bateman are credited collectively under the pseudonym Brianbert.) – 2:43

== Personnel ==
=== The Miracles ===
- Smokey Robinson - lead vocals, background vocals
- Ronnie White - lead vocals, background vocals
- Claudette Robinson - lead vocals, background vocals
- Warren "Pete" Moore - background vocals
- Bobby Rogers - background vocals
- Marv Tarplin - guitar

=== Other credits ===
- The Funk Brothers - additional instrumentation
- Berry Gordy - producer

== Cover versions ==
"Shop Around" has been covered by Captain & Tennille, Don Bryant, The Astronauts, The Spinners, Allusions, and Georgie Fame, among others. "After All" has been covered by The Supremes and The Marvelettes. "Way Over There" has been covered by Edwin Starr, The Temptations, The Marvelettes, The Royal Counts, New Man, and Eddie Adams Jr. "(You Can) Depend on Me" has been covered by The Temptations, The Supremes, Mary Wells and Brenda Holloway. "Who's Loving You" has been covered by The Temptations, The Supremes, The Jackson Five, Terence Trent-D'arby, Brenda and The Tabulations, John Farnham, Human Nature, and En Vogue.
