= Who's Lovin' You =

1960 song written by Smokey Robinson

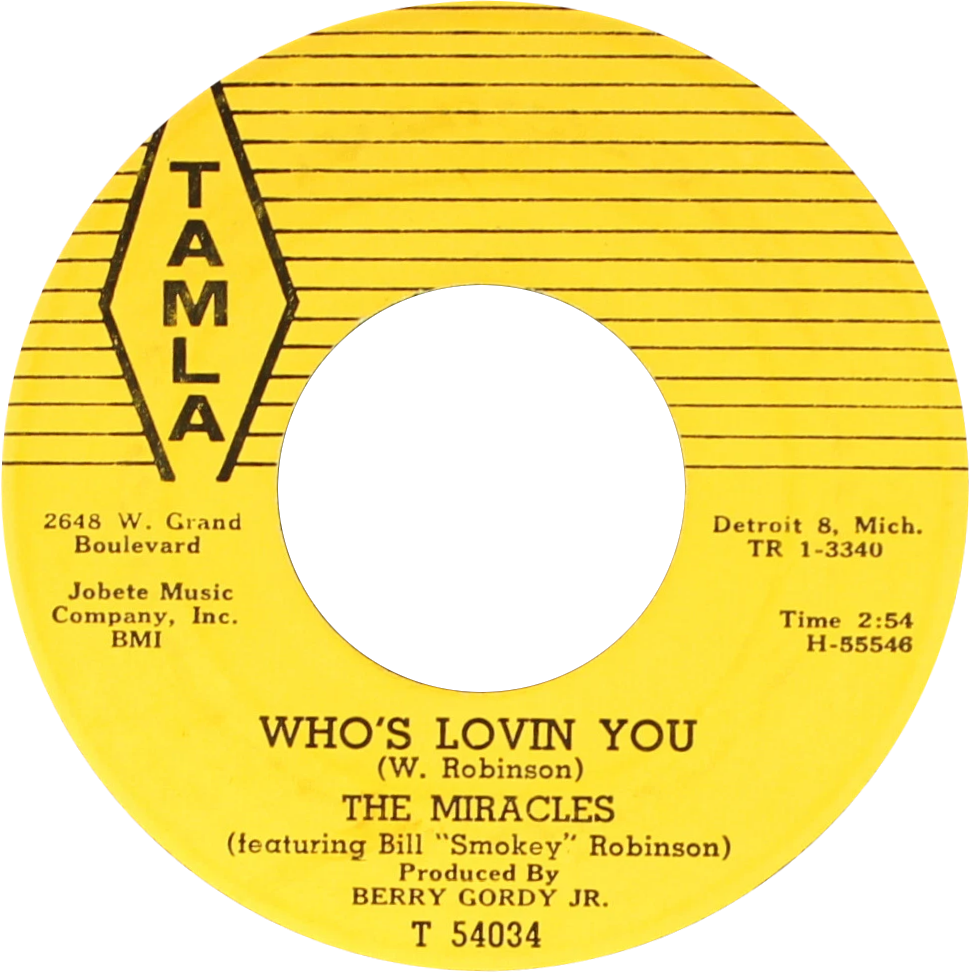
- The Miracles recording as side B of the US single

Single by the Miracles

from the album Hi, We're the Miracles
- A-side: "Shop Around"
- Released: September 27, 1960
- Genre: Soul
- Length: 3:06
- Label: Tamla
- Songwriter: William "Smokey" Robinson
- Producer: Berry Gordy Jr.

The Miracles singles chronology
"Shop Around" (1960)	"Who's Lovin' You" (1960)	"Ain't It Baby" (1961)

Audio
- "Who's Lovin' You" by the Miracles on YouTube

"Who's Lovin' You" is a Motown soul song, written in 1960 by William "Smokey" Robinson. The song has been recorded by many different artists including the Miracles, who recorded the 1960 original version, the Temptations, the Supremes, the Jackson 5, Brenda and the Tabulations, Terence Trent D'arby, John Farnham, Human Nature, En Vogue, Michael Bublé, Giorgia Todrani, and Jessica Mauboy. Shaheen Jafargholi performed the song at Michael Jackson's public memorial service in July 2009.

== The Miracles original version ==
The song was written by Smokey Robinson for his group the Miracles, who recorded the song in 1960 for their first Motown album, Hi... We're the Miracles. The song is a lamentation about an ex-lover, reminiscing on how their relationship went sour and wondering who's loving them now. A showcase for vocal runs, "Who's Lovin' You" was issued as a b-side to their first Motown hit, "Shop Around" (the label's first million-selling hit single), and remained one of their most popular songs (becoming a strong regional hit in many areas of the country).

During the 1960s, many Motown acts, including the Supremes, the Temptations, and Brenda Holloway, recorded a remake of the song.

=== Personnel ===
- Lead vocals by Smokey Robinson.
- Background vocals by Claudette Rogers Robinson, Pete Moore, Ronnie White, and Bobby Rogers.
- Guitar by Marv Tarplin
- Other Instrumentation performed by the Funk Brothers

== Brenda & the Tabulations version ==
"Who's Lovin' You"
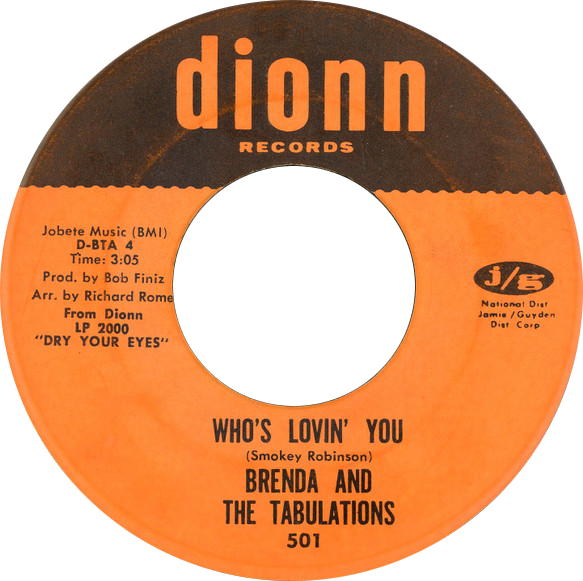
- US single of the Brenda & the Tabulations recording

Single by Brenda and the Tabulations

from the album Dry Your Eyes
- A-side: "Stay Together Young Lovers"
- Released: 1967
- Recorded: 1967
- Genre: Soul
- Length: 3:08
- Label: Dionn; D 501
- Songwriter: William "Smokey" Robinson
- Producer: Bob Finiz

Brenda and the Tabulations singles chronology
"Dry Your Eyes" (1967)	"Who's Lovin' You" (1967)	"Just Once in a Lifetime" (1967)

Though today this version is relatively obscure compared to others like those of the Miracles and the Jackson 5, it is to date the only one to place on the Billboard Hot 100. Released in 1967 on Dionn 501, Brenda & the Tabulations took this song to position #66. It was also a #19 hit on Billboard's R&B chart. The gender of the lyrics was amended to fit the female vocalist.

=== Chart history ===
Chart (1966)	Peak position
U.S. Billboard Hot 100 Chart	66
U.S. Billboard Top Selling R&B Singles	19

=== Personnel ===
- Lead vocals by Brenda Payton
- Background vocals by Eddie Jackson, Maurice Coates and Jerry Jones

== The Jackson 5 version ==
"Who's Lovin' You"
- CD variant of standard artwork; US CD edition was promo-only

Single by the Jackson 5

from the album Diana Ross Presents The Jackson 5
- A-side: "I Want You Back"
- Released: October 7, 1969
- Recorded: July 29 and August 7, 1969
- Studio: Hitsville USA (Studio A)
- Genre: Soul
- Length: 4:01 (album version); 4:20 (single version)
- Label: Motown; M1157
- Songwriter: William "Smokey" Robinson
- Producer: Bobby Taylor

The Jackson 5 singles chronology
"Big Boy" (1968)	"I Want You Back" / "Who's Lovin' You" (1969)	"ABC" (1970)

Performance video
- "Who's Lovin' You" by the Jackson 5 at The Ed Sullivan Show (December 14, 1969) on YouTube

Audio
- "Who's Lovin' You" by the Jackson 5 on YouTube

The most famous cover of "Who's Lovin' You", and the one most future covers were based upon, was recorded on August 7, 1969 by the Jackson 5. Michael Jackson was the lead singer on this recording, with his brothers Marlon, Tito, Jermaine, and Jackie on background vocals; Bobby Taylor of the Vancouvers served as producer. The Jackson 5 version of "Who's Lovin' You" was one of a number of early recordings the group made at the Hitsville U.S.A. recording studio in Detroit, Michigan, with the Funk Brothers on instrumentation - including Earl Van Dyke on keyboards, Robert White, Eddie Willis and Joe Messina on guitar, James Jamerson on bass, Uriel Jones on drums and Jack Ashford on percussion - arranged by David Van De Pitte. Just after recording this song, Berry Gordy moved the entire Jackson family to Los Angeles, California to record the hit pop songs he would co-write for the group with the Corporation.

The song was issued as the b-side to the Jackson 5's first single, "I Want You Back", which went to #1 on both the pop and R&B charts. A shortened version was included on the first Jackson 5 LP, Diana Ross Presents The Jackson 5. The original single version was twenty seconds longer, with fewer backing vocals and sparser instrumentation than the album version. The mono single mix was released on Michael Jackson's Love Songs compilation release in 2002.

=== Personnel ===
- Lead vocals by Michael Jackson
- Background vocals by Jermaine Jackson, Tito Jackson, Jackie Jackson, and Marlon Jackson
- Bass by James Jamerson
- Other Instrumentation performed by the Funk Brothers

=== Chart performance ===
On May 2, 2009, the song debuted at No. 54 in UK Official Singles Chart, and peaked at No.36 in July 2009.

=== Certifications ===
Region	Certification	Certified units/sales
New Zealand (RMNZ)	Platinum	30,000^{‡}
United Kingdom (BPI)	Gold	400,000^{‡}
^{‡} Sales+streaming figures based on certification alone.

== See also ==
- "Hold On" (En Vogue song)
