= You've Really Got a Hold on Me =

1962 Motown song by the Miracles

Single by the Miracles

from the album The Fabulous Miracles
- A-side: "Happy Landing"
- Released: November 9, 1962
- Recorded: October 16, 1962
- Studio: Hitsville USA, Detroit
- Genre: Soul
- Length: 3:11: 2:59 (single version)
- Label: Tamla
- Songwriter: William Robinson
- Producer: Smokey Robinson

The Miracles singles chronology
"I'll Try Something New" (1962)	"Happy Landing" / "You've Really Got a Hold on Me" (1962)	"A Love She Can Count On" (1963)

Official audio
- "You've Really Got a Hold on Me" on YouTube

"You've Really Got a Hold on Me" is a song written by Smokey Robinson, which became a 1962 top 10 hit single for the Miracles. One of the Miracles' most covered tunes (including a rendition by the Beatles for their second album, With the Beatles, in 1963), this million-selling song received a 1998 Grammy Hall of Fame Award. It has also been selected as one of The Rock and Roll Hall of Fame's 500 Songs that Shaped Rock and Roll.

== Composition and recording ==
"You've Really Got a Hold on Me" was written by Smokey Robinson while in New York in 1962 on business for Motown; he heard Sam Cooke's "Bring It On Home to Me", which was in the charts at the time, and—influenced by it—wrote the song in his hotel room.

The song was recorded in Motown's Studio A on October 16, 1962, with Robinson on lead vocals, and Miracles' second tenor Bobby Rogers on harmony co-lead. Robinson was the producer, and he had Eddie Willis and Miracle Marv Tarplin share the guitar parts.

== Release and reception ==
The song was released on the Tamla label on November 9, 1962, as the B-side of "Happy Landing". "Happy Landing" reached some regional charts; however, "You've Really Got a Hold on Me" was ultimately more successful. With "You've Really Got a Hold on Me" as the A-side, the single reached the top 10 on the Billboard Hot 100 Pop chart, peaking at number eight, and was a number one smash on the Billboard R&B singles chart during the winter of 1962–63. Cash Box described it as "a pulsating beat-ballad romancer that the artists carve out in emotion-packed fashion" and said "could be a real big dual-mart, pop-r&b sales item". Cash Box also praised the "captivating instrumental assist".

The Miracles' original version was inducted into the Grammy Hall of Fame in 1998. It was also the group's second single to sell over a million copies, after "Shop Around". The song was included on the album The Fabulous Miracles just over three months after its release.

== Personnel ==
The Miracles

- Smokey Robinson – lead vocal
- Claudette Rogers Robinson – backing vocal
- Pete Moore – backing vocal
- Ronnie White – backing vocal
- Bobby Rogers – co-lead vocal and backing vocal
- Marv Tarplin – guitar
- Other instruments by the Funk Brothers

== Charts ==
Chart performance for "You've Really Got a Hold on Me"
Chart (1962–1963)	Peak position
US Billboard Hot 100	8
US Billboard Hot R&B Sides	1

== The Beatles version ==
"You Really Got a Hold on Me"
- Sheet music cover

Song by the Beatles

from the album With the Beatles
- Released: November 22, 1963
- Recorded: July 18, 1963
- Studio: EMI, London
- Genre: R&B
- Length: 3:01
- Label: Parlophone
- Songwriter: Smokey Robinson
- Producer: George Martin

"You Really Got a Hold on Me" was the first song recorded for the Beatles' second British album, With the Beatles, and was included on their third US album, The Beatles' Second Album. It features John Lennon and George Harrison on lead vocals with Paul McCartney on harmony vocals. Bobby Rogers of the Miracles said of the cover that "We were both surprised and elated that they did it."

The Beatles recorded the song on July 18, 1963. This session took place while Please Please Me was still at number one in the album charts four months after its release, and in the midst of a rigorous touring schedule that also had to include BBC sessions for radio and television. It was completed in seven takes, four of which were complete. The group then recorded four edit pieces. The final version was an edit of takes 7, 10 and 11.

The Beatles also recorded "You Really Got a Hold on Me" on four occasions for BBC radio in 1963. One of these, from July 30, 1963 was included on the Live at the BBC collection. A live version recorded in Stockholm, Sweden, in October 1963 was released in 1995 on Anthology 1. The song was performed once again in 1969, during the Let It Be recording sessions, and featured in the 1970 documentary film, Let It Be.

=== Personnel ===
According to English music critic Ian MacDonald:

The Beatles

- John Lennon – lead vocal, rhythm guitar
- George Harrison – lead vocal, lead guitar
- Paul McCartney – harmony vocal, bass guitar
- Ringo Starr – drums

Additional musician

- George Martin – piano

== Other versions ==
The Miracles recorded a live version for their live album The Miracles Recorded Live on Stage, which was released just six months after the song's initial appearance as the B-side to "Happy Landing". In acknowledgment of its inspiration, their live renditions of "You Really Got a Hold on Me" incorporated an excerpt from "Bring It On Home to Me". In 1965, a cover version by The Zombies for their album Begin Here imitated the Miracles' live version, including the "Bring It On Home to Me" excerpt.

A rendition by Eddie Money, recorded for his self-titled debut album, reached number 72 on the U.S. Billboard Hot 100 in December 1978, and number 68 in Canada in January 1979.

In 1984, a version by American country music artist Mickey Gilley peaked at number two on the U.S. Billboard Hot Country Songs chart, and number one on the Canadian RPM Country Tracks chart.

A 1973 recording by Michael Jackson was released in 1984 on the album Farewell My Summer Love.

=== In popular culture ===
Smokey Robinson performed a rewritten version of the song on Sesame Street in 1985 called "U Really Got a Hold on Me", alongside a grabby feminine-looking Muppet letter "U", that keeps squeezing and grabbing him.

In 1965, Sonny & Cher recorded it for their debut album Look At Us. Cher covered it again with Gregg Allman for their album as the duo Allman and Woman, Two the Hard Way in 1977.

== Bibliography ==
- MacDonald, Ian (2007). Revolution in the Head: The Beatles' Records and the Sixties (Third ed.). Chicago: Chicago Review Press. ISBN 978-1-55652-733-3.
