= Happy Landing =

Happy Landing may refer to:

- "Happy Landing" (song), a 1962 song by The Miracles
- Happy Landing (1934 film), an American action film
- Happy Landing (1938 film), a film directed by Roy Del Ruth
- Happy Landing, Ontario, a community in French River, Ontario
