= I'll Try Something New (song) =

1962 single by The Miracles

Single by The Miracles

from the album I'll Try Something New
- B-side: "You Never Miss a Good Thing"
- Released: April 9, 1962
- Recorded: Hitsville USA (Studio A); 1961–1962
- Genre: Soul, pop
- Length: 3:00
- Label: Tamla
- Songwriter: Smokey Robinson
- Producers: Smokey Robinson; Berry Gordy

The Miracles singles chronology
"What's So Good About Goodbye" (1961)	"I'll Try Something New" (1962)	"You've Really Got a Hold on Me" (1962)

Audio
- "I'll Try Something New" by The Miracles on YouTube

"I'll Try Something New"

Single by Diana Ross & the Supremes and The Temptations

from the album Diana Ross & the Supremes Join The Temptations
- B-side: "The Way You Do the Things You Do"
- Released: February 20, 1969
- Recorded: Hitsville USA (Studios A & B); 1968
- Genre: Soul, pop
- Length: 2:25
- Label: Motown
- Songwriter: Smokey Robinson
- Producers: Frank Wilson; Deke Richards

Diana Ross & the Supremes singles chronology
"I'm Livin' in Shame" (1969)	"I'll Try Something New" (1969)	"The Composer" (1969)

The Temptations singles chronology
"Run Away Child, Running Wild" (1969)	"I'll Try Something New" (1969)	"Don't Let the Joneses Get You Down" (1969)

Diana Ross & the Supremes Join The Temptations track listing
- 11 tracks Side one: 1. "Try It Baby"; 2. "I Second That Emotion"; 3. "Ain't No Mountain High Enough"; 4. "I'm Gonna Make You Love Me"; 5. "This Guy's in Love with You"; 6. "Funky Broadway"; Side two: 7. "I'll Try Something New"; 8. "A Place in the Sun"; 9. "Sweet Inspiration"; 10. "Then"; 11. "The Impossible Dream"

Audio
- "I'll Try Something New" by Diana Ross and the Supremes & The Temptations on YouTube

"I'll Try Something New" is a song written by Smokey Robinson and originally released in 1962 by The Miracles on Motown Records' Tamla subsidiary label. Their version was a Billboard Top 40 hit, peaking at #39, and just missed the Top 10 of its R&B chart, peaking at #11. The song was released later as a joint single by Diana Ross & the Supremes and The Temptations, also becoming a charting version on the Billboard 100 pop singles chart, peaking for two weeks in April 1969 at number 25. In 1982, Robinson re-recorded the track with a more contemporary arrangement for his album Yes It's You Lady. In the song, the narrator says that if his first attempts at trying to show his lover affection are not good enough, he will try something new to keep their love alive.

== Composition and recording ==
Smokey Robinson wrote "I'll Try Something New" on a popcorn box while watching a baseball game at Tiger Stadium, which his wife and fellow Miracles member Claudette said was typical of how song ideas would come to him in unexpected places.

There is no record of the recording date for the song. Smokey and Motown founder Berry Gordy produced the song with an Oriental feel to it, with unusually lush-for-the-period orchestration and harp, signaling the dreamlike, romantic tone of the lyrics. During the second verse Claudette's background voice references the 1959 Frankie Avalon hit "Venus" ("Hey Venus..."). Motown issued the original version of "I'll Try Something New" as a single on April 9, 1962. A few months later, it was included on the album I'll Try Something New.

== Personnel ==
=== Miracles version ===
- Lead vocals by Smokey Robinson
- Background vocals by Claudette Rogers Robinson, Pete Moore, Ronnie White and Bobby Rogers
- Guitar by Marv Tarplin
- Instrumentation by The Funk Brothers and the Detroit Symphony Orchestra

=== Supremes and Temptations version ===
- Lead vocals by Diana Ross, Eddie Kendricks and Melvin Franklin
- Background vocals by Mary Wilson, Cindy Birdsong, Dennis Edwards, Eddie Kendricks, Paul Williams, Melvin Franklin, Otis Williams and The Andantes
- Instrumentation by The Funk Brothers, the Detroit Symphony Orchestra, and various Los Angeles area musicians

== Chart history ==
=== Miracles version ===
Chart	Peak position
U.S. Billboard Hot 100	39
U.S. Billboard R&B Singles Chart	11

=== The Supremes and The Temptations version ===
Chart (1969)	Peak position
Canada Top Singles (RPM)	16
US Billboard Hot 100	25
US Hot R&B/Hip-Hop Songs (Billboard)	8
US Cashbox Top 100	21
US Cashbox R&B	16
US Record World 100 Top Pops	19
US Record World Top 50 R&B	14

== Track listing ==
- 7" single (20 February 1969) (North America) (Diana Ross & the Supremes/The Temptations)
1. "I'll Try Something New" – 2:18
2. "The Way You Do the Things You Do" – 1:39

== Cover versions ==
In 1966, R&B artist Spyder Turner covered the song as an excerpt of his hit cover of the Ben E King song "Stand by Me". Several years later, in 1969, the group's Motown label-mates The Supremes and The Temptations released a duet version that became a hit reaching number 25 on the Hot 100 and number 8 on the R&B chart. Disco/pop group A Taste of Honey also covered the song 20 years later, in 1982 peaking at number 41 on the Hot 100 and number 9 on the R&B chart.
