= Cookin' with the Miracles =

Studio album by the Miracles
- Released: November 13, 1961
- Studios: Hitsville USA, Detroit; RCA Studios, Chicago
- Genre: Soul
- Label: Tamla
- Producer: Berry Gordy, Jr.

The Miracles chronology
Hi... We're the Miracles (1961)	Cookin' with the Miracles (1961)	I'll Try Something New (1962)

Singles from Cookin' with the Miracles
- 1. "Ain't It Baby" Released: March 15, 1961; 2. "Mighty Good Lovin' / Broken Hearted" Released: June 3, 1961; 3. "Everybody's Gotta Pay Some Dues" Released: September 19, 1961

Professional ratings
Review scores
Source	Rating
Allmusic	3/5 stars

Cookin' with the Miracles is the second studio album by the American R&B group the Miracles. It was released on November 13, 1961, on Motown's Tamla label. Motown's finances had significantly improved by the time of Cookin' with the Miracles, allowing a much more polished production and much more extensive instrumentation than the Miracles' debut album Hi... We're the Miracles. As with their debut, the Miracles' lead singer Smokey Robinson wrote or co-wrote most of the songs, including the two charting singles "Ain't It Baby" (#49 US, #15 R&B) and "Everybody's Gotta Pay Some Dues" (#52 US, #11 R&B). Another single, "Mighty Good Lovin’" (#51 US, #21 R&B) b/w "Broken Hearted" (#97 US), was issued in between those two. However, only "Broken Hearted" appears on the album, featuring a different vocal take to the single version. Despite the more elaborate production, Cookin' with the Miracles contained no big hits, and Miracle Claudette Robinson went so far as to say that "Ain't it Baby" was "the biggest flop we ever had."

As suggested by its title, the album is composed mostly of upbeat R&B tunes with steady string riffs, like "Determination", "Broken Hearted", and "Mama", but more tender doo-wop flavored pieces like "The Only One I Love" and "I Can't Believe" add variety. "Mama" also introduces a humorous side to the Miracles, with lyrics from the perspective of a man exuberantly telling his mother of his intention to marry a woman he met just a week ago. A cover of the jazz standard "Embraceable You" by George & Ira Gershwin is also included. "That's The Way I Feel", also from this album, was chosen for the soundtrack of the award-winning 1964 Ivan Dixon film Nothing But a Man.

Cookin' with the Miracles is one of only two Miracles albums to feature on its cover the complete original six-member group lineup: Smokey Robinson, Bobby Rogers, Claudette Rogers Robinson, Pete Moore, Ronnie White and Marv Tarplin.

== Track listing ==
=== Side one ===
1. "That's The Way I Feel" (Berry Gordy, Jr., Smokey Robinson) (2:38)
2. "Everybody's Gotta Pay Some Dues" (Robinson, Ronald White) (2:55)
3. "Mama" (Robinson, Janie Bradford, Gordy) (2:18)
4. "Ain't It Baby" (Gordy, Robinson) (2:33)
5. "Determination" (Robinson) (2:17)

=== Side two ===
1. "You Never Miss A Good Thing" (Gordy, Robinson) (2:42)
2. "Embraceable You" (George & Ira Gershwin) (2:49)
3. "The Only One I Love" (Robinson) (2:34)
4. "Broken Hearted" (Gordy, Robinson) (2:56)
5. "I Can't Believe" (Robinson) (2:52)

=== 1994 CD reissue bonus track ===
- "Mighty Good Lovin'" (Robinson) (2:37)

== Personnel ==
=== The Miracles ===
- Smokey Robinson – lead vocals (1st tenor/falsetto)
- Ronnie White – background vocals (baritone)
- Bobby Rogers – background vocals (2nd tenor)
- Warren "Pete" Moore – background vocals (bass)
- Claudette Robinson – background vocals (soprano)
- Marv Tarplin – guitar

=== Other credits ===
- Berry Gordy, Jr. – producer, executive producer
- The Funk Brothers – instrumentation
