= Shop Around =

1960 song recorded by the Miracles

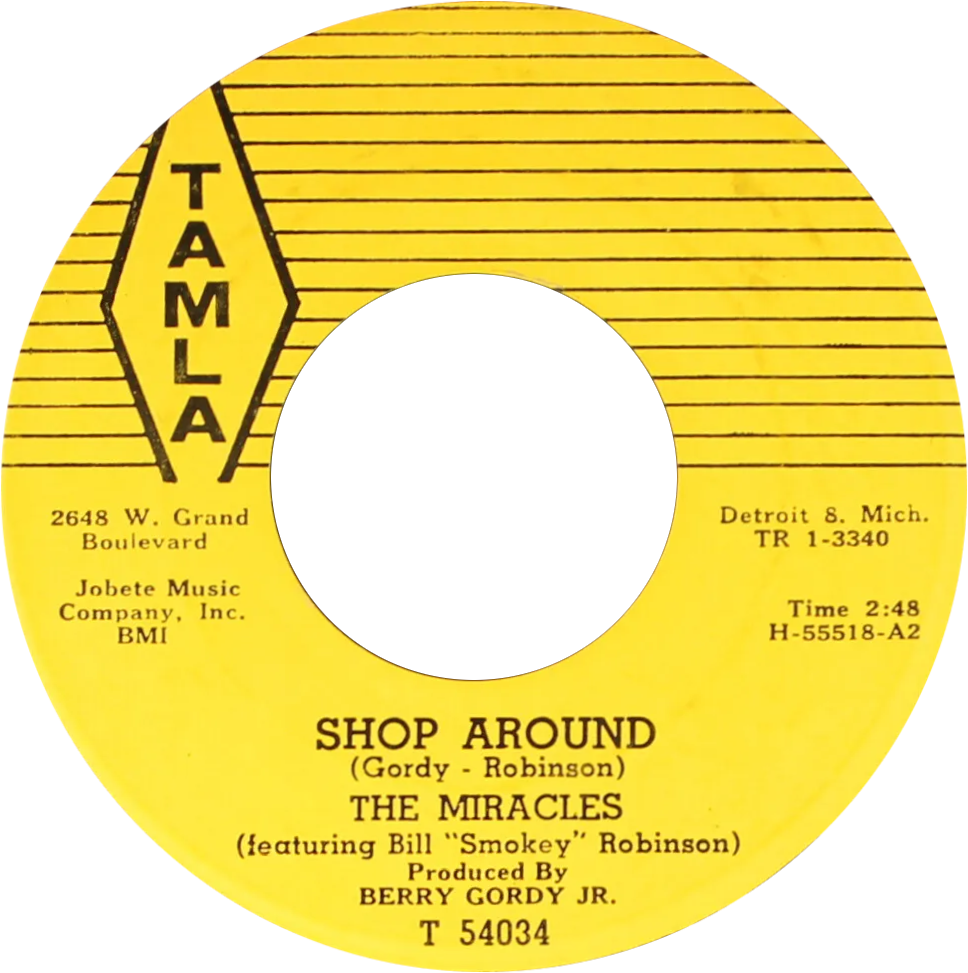
- Side A of the US single

Single by the Miracles

from the album Hi... We're the Miracles
- B-side: "Who's Lovin' You"
- Released: September 27, 1960
- Recorded: 1960
- Studio: Hitsville USA (Studio A)
- Genre: Soul; R&B; pop
- Length: 3:04 (Detroit version); 2:50 (national hit version)
- Label: Tamla
- Songwriters: Smokey Robinson; Berry Gordy
- Producer: Berry Gordy

The Miracles singles chronology
"Way Over There" (1960)	"Shop Around" (1960)	"Who's Lovin' You" (1960)

Official audio
- "Shop Around" on YouTube

"Shop Around" is a song originally recorded by the Miracles on Motown Records' Tamla subsidiary label. It was written by Miracles lead singer Smokey Robinson and Motown Records founder Berry Gordy. It became a smash hit in 1960 when originally recorded by the Miracles, reaching number one on the Billboard R&B chart, number one on the Cashbox Top 100 Pop Chart, and number two on the Billboard Hot 100 chart. It was the Miracles' first million-selling hit record, and the first million-selling hit for the Motown Record Corporation.

The single was a multiple award winner for the Miracles, having been inducted into the Grammy Hall of Fame in 2006, inducted into the Rock and Roll Hall of Fame as one of the 500 Songs that Shaped Rock and Roll, and honored by Rolling Stone as number 500 in their list of the 500 Greatest Songs of All Time, dropping it five spots from number 495 in the 2004 version.

== The Miracles original version ==
=== Background ===
The original version of "Shop Around" by the Miracles was released in 1960 on Motown's Tamla label, catalog number T 54034. The song, written by Smokey Robinson and Berry Gordy, depicts a mother giving her now-grown son advice about how to find a woman worthy of being a girlfriend or wife ("My mama told me/'you better shop around'"). The original version of the song had a strong blues influence, and was released in the local area of Detroit, Michigan, before Gordy decided that the song needed to be re-recorded to achieve wider commercial appeal. At 3:00 one morning, the Miracles (Robinson, Claudette Rogers Robinson, Bobby Rogers, Ronnie White, and Pete Moore) recorded a new, more pop music version of the song that became a major national hit. The original record label credits Robinson as the writer, with Berry Gordy as producer. On the American Top 40 program of July 4, 1987, Casey Kasem reported that Gordy had previously rejected 100 songs by Robinson as "garbage" before accepting the 101st, "Shop Around", as "a hit".

The single was the first Motown record to be released in the UK, on Decca Records' London label. The subsequent EP release, coupled the "Shop Around" single with its follow-up, "Ain't It Baby". The two singles and the EP were the only Motown releases on the London label.

=== Reception ===
"Shop Around" was a big hit for the Miracles, becoming the group's first number-one hit on the Billboard R&B singles chart, spending eight weeks at the top, and also hitting number two on the Billboard Hot 100, behind "Calcutta" by Lawrence Welk. "Shop Around" also reached number one on the Cashbox magazine Top 100 pop chart, and is also noted for being the first million-selling record for the Miracles and for the Motown Record Corporation, as well as a 2006 Grammy Hall of Fame inductee. The B-side to "Shop Around", "Who's Lovin' You", also had a plethora of covers, including a version by the Jackson 5 in 1969.

"Shop Around" inspired an answer record, "Don't Let Him Shop Around" by Debbie Dean, which charted at number 92 on the Hot 100 in February 1961 and was Dean's only chart entry. Smokey Robinson later recorded a sequel song for his 1987 album One Heartbeat, entitled "It's Time to Stop Shopping Around".

=== Awards and accolades ===
- The Motown Record Corporation's first million-selling hit record
- Inducted into the Grammy Hall of Fame in 2006
- The Motown Record Corporation's first Billboard number-one R&B hit: It held that position on the Billboard R&B Chart for eight consecutive weeks.
- Ranked as number 500 on Rolling Stone's list of "Rolling Stone's 500 Greatest Songs of All Time".
- Reached number one on the Cashbox magazine pop chart
- The first Motown Records song to reach the top five on the Billboard pop chart
- Honored by the Rock and Roll Hall of Fame as one of the "500 Songs that Shaped Rock and Roll".

=== Personnel ===
The Miracles

- Smokey Robinson – lead vocals, writer
- Marv Tarplin – guitar
- Claudette Rogers Robinson – background vocals
- Pete Moore – background vocals
- Ronnie White – background vocals
- Bobby Rogers – background vocals

Additional personnel

- Berry Gordy – piano, writer, producer
- The Funk Brothers – other instrumentation
  - Joe Hunter – keyboards
  - James Jamerson – bass
  - Benny Benjamin – drums
  - Ron Wakefield – tenor saxophone
  - Mike Terry – baritone saxophone

=== Charts ===
==== Weekly charts ====
Weekly chart performance for "Shop Around"
Chart (1960–1961)	Peak position
Canada (CHUM)	11
US Billboard Hot 100	2
US Billboard R&B	1
US Cash Box Top 100	1

==== Year-end charts ====
Year-end chart performance for "Shop Around"
Chart (1961)	Rank
US Billboard Hot 100	24
US Cash Box Top 100	25

== Captain & Tennille version ==
"Shop Around"

Single by Captain & Tennille

from the album Song of Joy
- B-side: "Butterscotch Castle"
- Released: 1976
- Genre: Pop
- Length: 3:29
- Label: A&M
- Songwriters: Smokey Robinson; Berry Gordy
- Producers: Daryl Dragon, Toni Tennille

Captain & Tennille singles chronology
"Lonely Night (Angel Face)" (1976)	"Shop Around" (1976)	"Muskrat Love" (1976)

=== Background ===
In 1976, the American pop music duo Captain & Tennille released their version of "Shop Around" for their second studio album, Song of Joy, issued on the A&M Records label. Toni Tennille changed the lyrics slightly so that they were sung from a woman's perspective. The "Shop Around" single was produced by the duo and featured the song "Butterscotch Castle" as its B-side. The single first entered the US Billboard Hot 100 chart on May 1, 1976, at number 62.

=== Reception ===
Released as the second single of Captain & Tennille from the Song of Joy album, their version of "Shop Around" was a success. The single reached number 4 in Canada on the RPM singles chart and peaked at number 4 on the US Hot 100 chart on July 9, 1976. While not out-charting The Miracles' original, their version became a gold record, and also topped the Billboard easy listening chart for one week in 1976.

=== Charts ===
==== Weekly charts ====
Chart (1976)	Peak position
Australia (KMR)	37
Canada RPM Top Singles	4
Canada RPM Adult Contemporary	1
New Zealand (RIANZ)	32
US Billboard Hot 100	4
US Billboard Adult Contemporary	1
US Cash Box Top 100	6

==== Year-end charts ====
Chart (1976)	Rank
Canada	64
US Billboard Top 100 Singles	63
US Billboard Adult Contemporary	37
US Cash Box Top 100	26

=== Personnel ===
- Toni Tennille – piano, vocals, background vocal
- Daryl Dragon – guitar, bass guitar, keyboards
- Hal Blaine – drums, percussion
- Gary Sims – bass vocal

== Other versions ==
"Shop Around" has been covered many times, including versions by:

- Mary Wells (1961)
- Johnnie Ray (1961)
- Georgie Fame & the Blue Flames (1964)
- Johnny Kidd & the Pirates (1964)
- Helen Shapiro (1964)
- Bobby Vee (1965)
- Russ Giguere (1971)
- The Spinners (1983)
- The Astronauts
- Don Bryant
- The Allusions
- Clarence Reid
- Neil Merryweather
- Lynn Carey
- Angela Miller

== See also ==
- List of number-one R&B singles of 1961 (U.S.)
- List of number-one adult contemporary singles of 1976 (U.S.)
