= Marv Tarplin =

American guitarist (1941–2011)

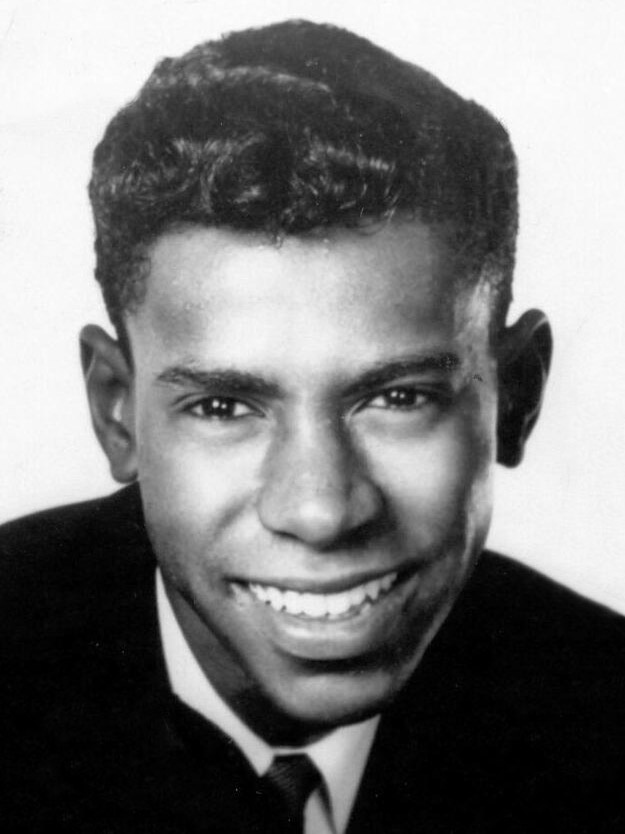
- Tarplin in 1962

Background information
- Born: Marvin Tarplin; June 13, 1941; Atlanta, Georgia, U.S.
- Died: September 30, 2011 (aged 70) Las Vegas, Nevada, U.S.
- Genre: Soul
- Occupations: Musician, songwriter
- Instrument: Guitar
- Years active: 1958–2008
- Label: Motown

Marvin “Marv” Tarplin (June 13, 1941 – September 30, 2011) was an American musician, best known as the guitarist for the Miracles from the 1950s through the early 1970s. He was one of the group's original members and co-wrote several of their biggest hits, including the 1965 Grammy Hall Of Fame-inducted "The Tracks of My Tears". He is also a winner of the BMI Songwriter's Award, and the ASCAP Award Of Merit, and was a 2012 posthumous inductee into the Rock and Roll Hall of Fame with the Miracles.

== Biography ==
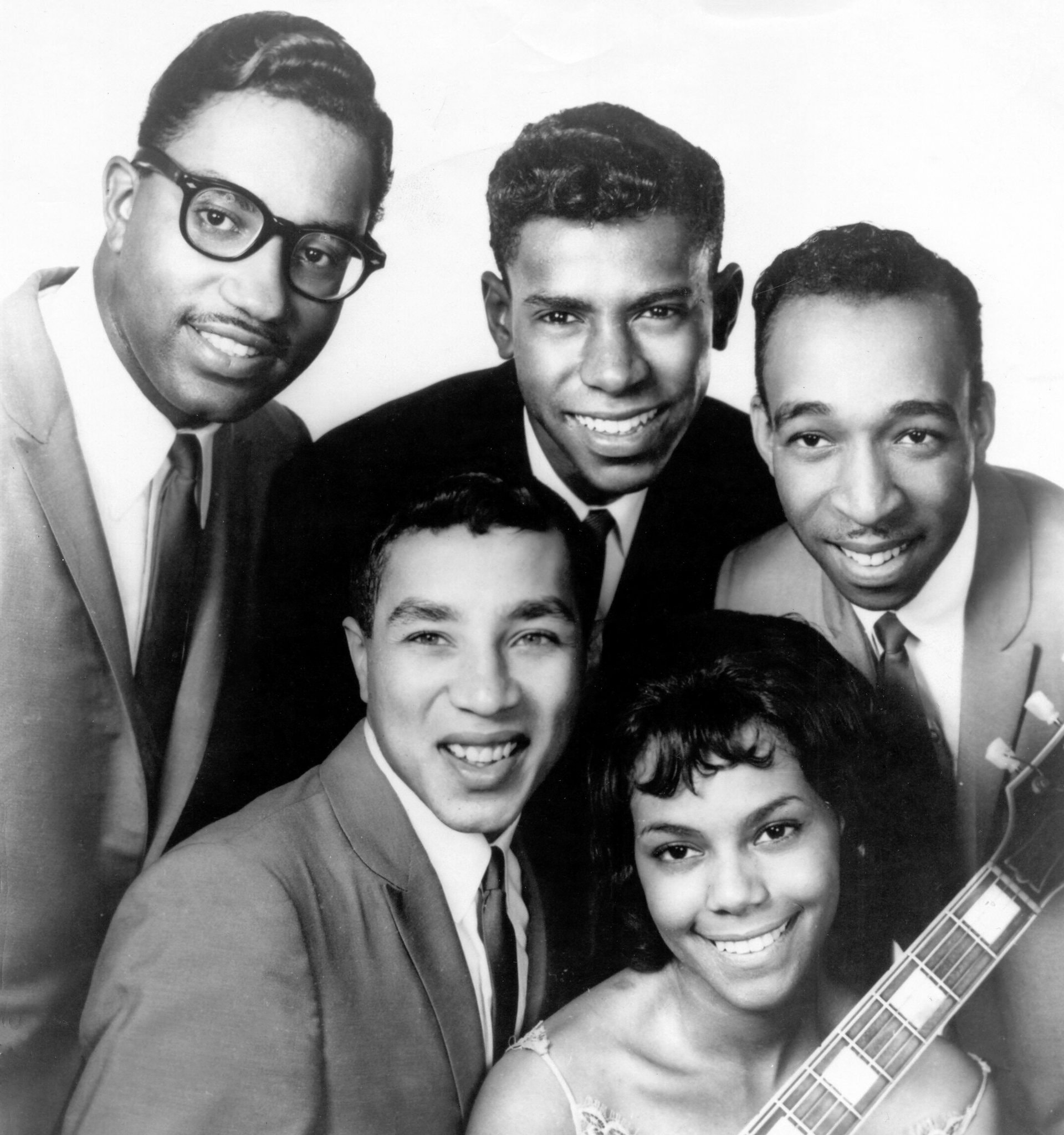
The Miracles, c. 1962. Clockwise from top left: Bobby Rogers, Tarplin, Ronald White, Claudette Robinson, and Smokey Robinson. Not pictured: Pete Moore, who had, at the time, been drafted into the military.

Referred to as the Miracles' "secret weapon", Tarplin began his career accompanying the Supremes, who at the time were still teenagers and known as the Primettes. They were seeking an audition with Motown Records, and Tarplin played guitar as they performed for Miracles lead singer Smokey Robinson. Robinson was impressed by Tarplin's guitar playing and lured him away from the Primettes to join the Miracles in 1958. In the 2006 Motown DVD release, Smokey Robinson & the Miracles: The Definitive Performances 1963–1987, Robinson and fellow Miracles Pete Moore and Bobby Rogers commented that Tarplin's guitar playing style was reminiscent of the late Curtis Mayfield, and was the inspiration behind many of their greatest hits. His guitar riffs at the beginning of the Miracles' 1965 Grammy Hall of Fame million-seller, "The Tracks of My Tears", are among the most famous in pop music history.

While Tarplin remained with the Miracles for as long as Robinson was their lead singer, he is only present on the cover of three classic Miracles albums: Cookin' with the Miracles (1962), I'll Try Something New (1962), and The Fabulous Miracles (1963). He is mentioned, though not pictured, on the back cover of the group's very first album, Hi... We're the Miracles (1961), and listed as an original group member. As a songwriter, Tarplin helped co-compose many of the Miracles' hit singles, amongst them the million-selling Grammy Hall of Fame winner "The Tracks of My Tears" for which he received the ASCAP Award of Merit (1965), "My Girl Has Gone" (1965), "I Like It Like That", (1964), "Going to a Go-Go" (1965), "The Love I Saw in You Was Just a Mirage" (1967), and "Point It Out" (1968).

In addition, Tarplin co-wrote several Robinson-produced hits by Marvin Gaye, including the Top 10 million selling hits "Ain't That Peculiar" and "I'll Be Doggone". His guitar work was featured on Gaye's Top 40 hit, "One More Heartache", which he also co-wrote, and another of Gaye's chart hits, 1965's "Take This Heart of Mine". He also played on The Four Tops 1970 Top 20 hit "Still Water (Love)", co-written by Robinson, and The Marvelettes' 1967 Top 20 hit "My Baby Must Be a Magician". Tarplin also appeared with the group on The Ed Sullivan Show; the 1964 film The T.A.M.I. Show; the 1965 CBS television special Murray The K – It's What's Happening, Baby; and virtually all of the group's personal appearance concerts worldwide, including the Motortown Revue shows in the early 1960s. Marv also appeared onstage with the Miracles on the 1983 NBC-TV music special Motown 25: Yesterday, Today, Forever .

Tarplin left the Miracles in 1973, shortly after Smokey Robinson and his wife Claudette left the group. His replacement in the Miracles was Donald Griffin, brother of Billy Griffin (Robinson's replacement in the group).

Robinson and Tarplin continued to collaborate as writers on Robinson's solo recordings, including the hit "Cruisin'" (1979). Tarplin also continued to play guitar on recordings and in concert for Robinson and, until 2008, continued to tour with Robinson. In 2007, Milwaukee, Wisconsin musician Paul Cebar paid homage to Tarplin with his song "Marv's Fluttering Guitar (For Marv Tarplin)" from the album Tomorrow Sound Now For Yes Music People.

== Rock and Roll Hall of Fame controversy ==
In 1987, Smokey Robinson was inducted into the Rock and Roll Hall of Fame as a solo artist. However, in a decision that has since sparked much scrutiny, debate, and controversy, Tarplin, and the other original members of the Miracles, Bobby Rogers, Ronnie White, Pete Moore and Claudette Robinson, were not. The Miracles were finally retroactively inducted into the hall by a special committee in 2012, alongside Smokey Robinson. Tarplin retired from touring in 2008 and is pictured on the cover of the 2009 Motown CD release The Miracles – Depend On Me: The Early Albums.

== Rock and Roll Hall of Fame induction in 2012 ==
On February 9, 2012 (just 5 months after his death), it was announced that Marv Tarplin would be posthumously inducted with the rest of the Miracles into the Rock and Roll Hall of Fame alongside group lead singer Smokey Robinson. This induction occurred on April 14, 2012. After a 26-year wait, Marvin was automatically and retroactively inducted with the rest of the original Miracles, Bobby Rogers, Pete Moore, Claudette Robinson, and Ronnie White into The Rock and Roll Hall of Fame alongside Miracles lead singer Smokey Robinson. The induction was handled by a special committee designated in 2012 to induct the Miracles and five other pioneering groups that had been overlooked when their lead singers had been inducted into the Rock Hall many years previously. This induction occurred without the usual process of nomination and voting, under the premise that the entire group should have been inducted with Smokey Robinson back in 1987.

== Later years and death ==
Three years after he had stopped touring with Robinson, Tarplin died in his Las Vegas home of undetermined causes on September 30, 2011. He was 70. Tarplin had three daughters, named Talese, Lisa and Eboney.

== Compositions ==
Tarplin wrote the music for numerous songs, including several of Motown's biggest hits. Here is a partial list:

- "I Can't Believe", The Miracles (1962)
- "I Like It Like That", The Miracles (1964, No. 27 Pop)
- "You're So Fine And Sweet", The Miracles
- "Come On Do The Jerk", The Miracles (1964, # 50 Pop, No. 22 R&B)
- "Ain't That Peculiar", Marvin Gaye (1965, No. 8 Pop, No. 1 R&B)
- "The Tracks of My Tears", The Miracles (1965, No. 16 Pop, No. 2 R&B)
- "My Girl Has Gone", The Miracles (1965, No. 14 Pop, No. 3 R&B)
- "Going to a Go-Go", The Miracles (1965, No. 11 Pop, No. 2 R&B)
- "My Business, Your Pleasure", The Miracles
- "One More Heartache", Marvin Gaye (1966, No. 29 Pop, No. 4 R&B)
- "Take This Heart of Mine", Marvin Gaye (1966, No. 44 Pop)
- "I'll Be Doggone", Marvin Gaye (1966 # 1 R&B, # 8 Pop)
- "You're Not An Ordinary Girl", The Temptations (1966)
- "The Love I Saw in You Was Just a Mirage", Smokey Robinson & The Miracles (1967, No. 20 Pop, No. 10 R&B)
- Dancing's Alright", Smokey Robinson & The Miracles (1967)
- "Doggone Right", Smokey Robinson & The Miracles (1969, No. 32 Pop)
- "Point It Out", Smokey Robinson & The Miracles (1969, No. 37 Pop)
- "Promise Me", Smokey Robinson & The Miracles (1969)
- "So Far", The Four Tops (1969)
- "The Hurt Is Over", Smokey Robinson & The Miracles (1969)
- "You Neglect Me"", Smokey Robinson & The Miracles (1969)
- "Flower Girl", Smokey Robinson & The Miracles (1970)
- "Precious Little Things", The Supremes (1972)
- "Baby Come Close", Smokey Robinson (1973, No. 27 Pop)
- "Just My Soul Responding", Smokey Robinson (1973)
- "Asleep on My Love", Smokey Robinson (1974)
- "Fulfill Your Need", Smokey Robinson (1974)
- "Just Passing Through", Smokey Robinson (1974)
- "Open", Smokey Robinson (1976, No. 81 Pop)
- "Madam X", Smokey Robinson (1978)
- "Cruisin'", Smokey Robinson (1979, No. 4 Pop)
- "I've Made Love To You A Thousand Times" (1983, No. 68 R&B)
- "Why Do Memories Hurt So Bad", Smokey Robinson (1987)
- "The Philly Dog", Earl Van Dyke
- "Baby I'm Glad Things Worked Out So Well", Marvin Gaye
- "Lost For Words", The Four Tops

== Awards ==
- Tarplin, and the other Miracles (except Claudette), has been a multiple winner of The BMI Songwriters Award .
- Tarplin, along with fellow Miracles Pete Moore and Smokey Robinson, was the winner of "The Award Of Merit" from The American Society of Composers, Authors, and Publishers (ASCAP) for co- composing "The Tracks of My Tears".
- British music magazine Mojo chose Tarplin as one of the '100 Greatest Guitarists of All Time'.
- The Miracles (including Tarplin), were honored with a star on the Hollywood Walk Of Fame on March 20, 2009.
- The Miracles, including Tarplin, were retroactively inducted into the Rock and Roll Hall of Fame by a special committee in 2012.
