= Claudette Rogers Robinson =

American singer (born 1942)

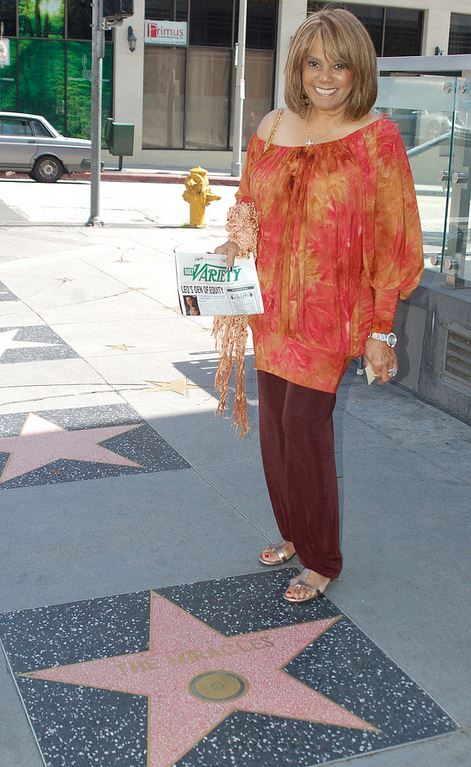
- Robinson next to the Hollywood Walk of Fame star for the Miracles in 2013

Background information
- Born: Claudette Annette Rogers; June 20, 1942 (age 84); New Orleans, Louisiana, U.S.
- Origin: Detroit, Michigan, U.S.
- Genres: R&B; doo-wop; soul; pop; smooth soul
- Occupation: Singer
- Years active: 1956–2010
- Labels: Motown; Tamla
- Formerly of: The Miracles
- Spouse: Smokey Robinson (m. 1959; div. 1986)

Claudette Annette Robinson (née Rogers; born June 20, 1942) is an American singer and author, best known as a member of the vocal group The Miracles from 1957 to 1972. Her brother Emerson "Sonny" Rogers was a founding member of the group, which before 1957 was named "The Matadors". Claudette replaced her brother in the group after he enlisted in the U.S. Army.

In 2012, Claudette was inducted into the Rock and Roll Hall of Fame with the rest of the original Miracles, including her cousin Bobby Rogers, Pete Moore, Ronald White, and Marv Tarplin. She was inducted alongside her former husband and Miracles bandmate, lead singer Smokey Robinson.

== Biography ==
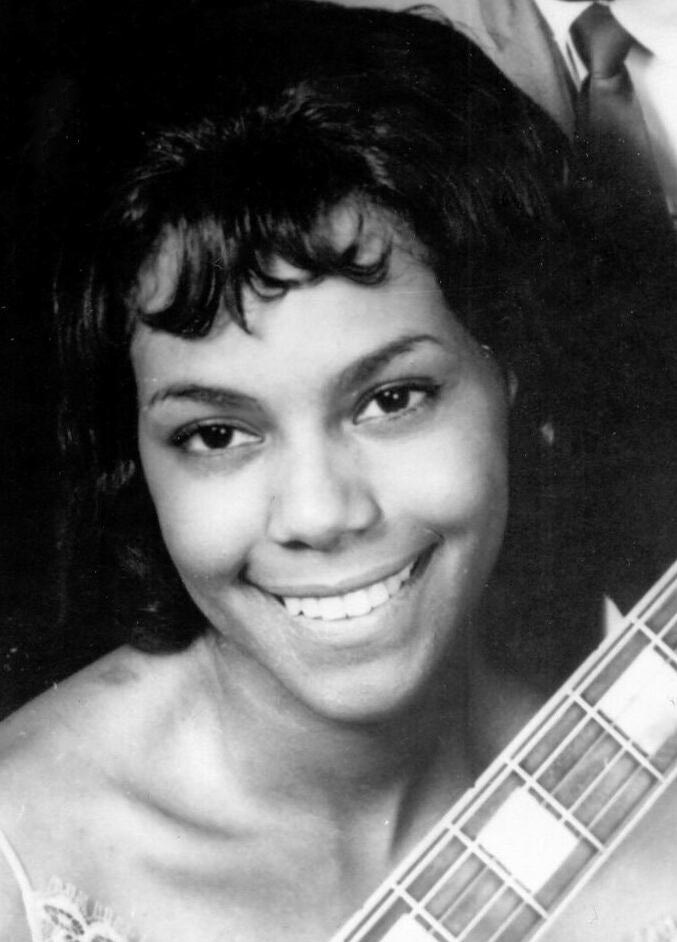
Robinson in 1962

In 1957 Claudette Rogers replaced her brother Sonny in the vocal group the Matadors, which shortly afterward was renamed the Miracles. Due to her marriage to the Miracles' lead singer Smokey Robinson in 1959, her stage name became Claudette Robinson, though the liner notes of the group's 1961 debut album Hi... We're the Miracles credit her as Claudette Rogers even while noting that she is the wife of Smokey Robinson. Claudette served primarily as a backing vocalist for the group, though in their early years she sang the occasional lead, either jointly with the other Miracles or (as in the case of "After All" from Hi... We're the Miracles) as a song's sole lead vocalist. Her cousin and original Miracles member Bobby Rogers summarized her role in the group: "Claudette was the key. She has a high voice and everything we did was a little higher to reach her voice. She and Smokey would almost sing the same note, which gave him a lot of leeway because he could sing something different and that note would still be in the background."

According to Robinson, many people told her she should sing lead more often, especially because she had such a strong voice that producers often told her she was singing too loud, but she was extremely shy and felt more comfortable singing background.

Smokey Robinson co-wrote the number-one Motown single "My Girl" with Miracles member Ronnie White in dedication to Claudette, a song performed most notably by The Temptations. Motown founder Berry Gordy gave Claudette the official title of the "First Lady of Motown", as noted in his autobiography, because, as a member of The Miracles, Motown's first group and first recording act, she was the first female artist ever signed to a Motown-affiliated record label (Tamla).

Robinson began writing her autobiography, A Miraculous Life, a book of her memoirs, and of her life with The Miracles. Robinson is a board member of the national Rhythm & Blues Foundation and the HAL Awards, and has continued to perform and make selected appearances with The Miracles, such as on the "Motown 25" television special.

== Personal life ==
Claudette Rogers and Smokey Robinson were married on November 7, 1959. The marriage produced two children; both have Motown-referenced names:

- Berry William Borope Robinson was named after label chief Berry Gordy with his first middle name, "William", in honor of his father (William "Smokey" Robinson), and his second middle name in honor of fellow Miracles group mates Bobby (Rogers), Ronnie (White) and Pete (Moore)
- Tamla Claudette Robinson was named after Motown's original record label, Tamla Records with her middle name "Claudette", after her mother

== Rock Hall of Fame controversy and 2012 Miracles induction ==
In 1987, Smokey Robinson was inducted into the Rock and Roll Hall of Fame as a solo artist. However, in a controversial decision, the other original members of The Miracles—Bobby Rogers, Ronnie White, Pete Moore, Marv Tarplin, and Claudette Robinson—were not.

In 2012, it was finally announced that, after a 26-year wait, Claudette Robinson would be automatically and retroactively inducted with the rest of The Miracles into the Rock and Roll Hall of Fame alongside Miracles lead singer Smokey Robinson.

== Author ==
In 2019, she released her first children's book, entitled "Claudette's Miraculous Motown Adventure".

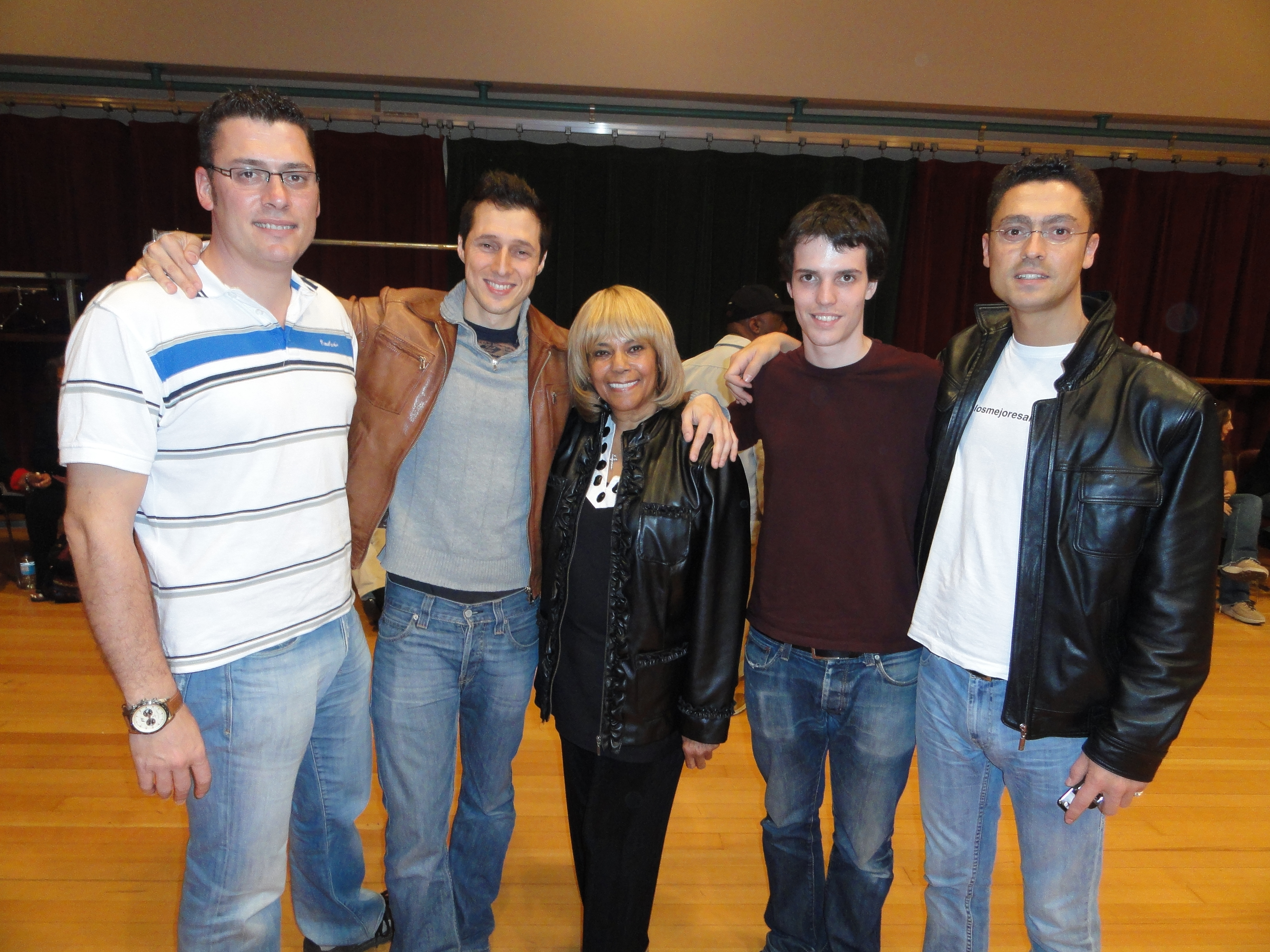
Claudette pictured with members of The Earth Angels doo wop band

== Awards ==
- Claudette and the original members of The Miracles were honored with a star on the Hollywood Walk of Fame on March 20, 2009.
- Worldwide more than 60 million records sold.
- Doo-Wop Hall of Fame Inductees.
- Vocal Group Hall of Fame Induction and Award.
- Miracles Boulevard and Miracles Park, Detroit, Michigan (Woodbridge Estates), named in honor of Motown group The Miracles.
- The Miracles received a star on the Hollywood Walk of Fame on March 20, 2009.
- Goldmine Magazine names The Miracles one of the "20 Greatest Doo-Wop Groups of All Time" .
- The Miracles were retroactively inducted into the Rock and Roll Hall of Fame in 2012 alongside Smokey Robinson.
