= Bobby Rogers =

American singer (1940–2013)

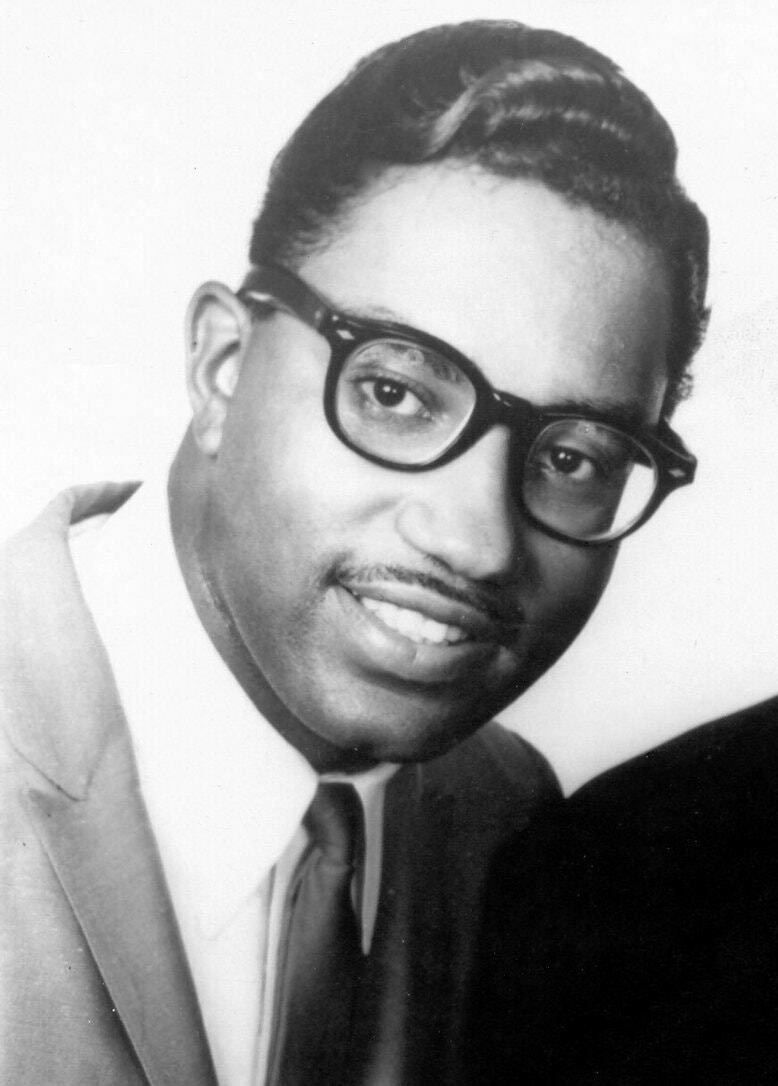
- Rogers in 1962

Background information
- Also known as: BR. "Bobby"
- Born: Robert Edward Rogers; February 19, 1940; Detroit, Michigan, U.S.
- Died: March 3, 2013 (aged 73) Southfield, Michigan, U.S.
- Genres: R&B; soul; pop
- Occupations: Singer, songwriter
- Years active: 1956–2013
- Labels: Tamla, Motown

Robert Edward Rogers (February 19, 1940 – March 3, 2013) was an American musician and tenor singer, best known as a founding member of Motown vocal group the Miracles from 1956 until his death. He was inducted, in 2012, as a member of the Miracles to the Rock and Roll Hall of Fame. In addition to singing, he also contributed to writing some of the Miracles' songs. Rogers is the grandfather of R&B singer Brandi Williams from the R&B girl group Blaque and is a cousin of fellow Miracles member Claudette Rogers Robinson.

== Early life ==
Rogers was the son of Robert and Lois Rogers. He was born in Detroit on February 19, 1940, the same day and in the same Detroit hospital as fellow Miracles member Smokey Robinson, although the two would not meet until 15 years later.

== Career ==
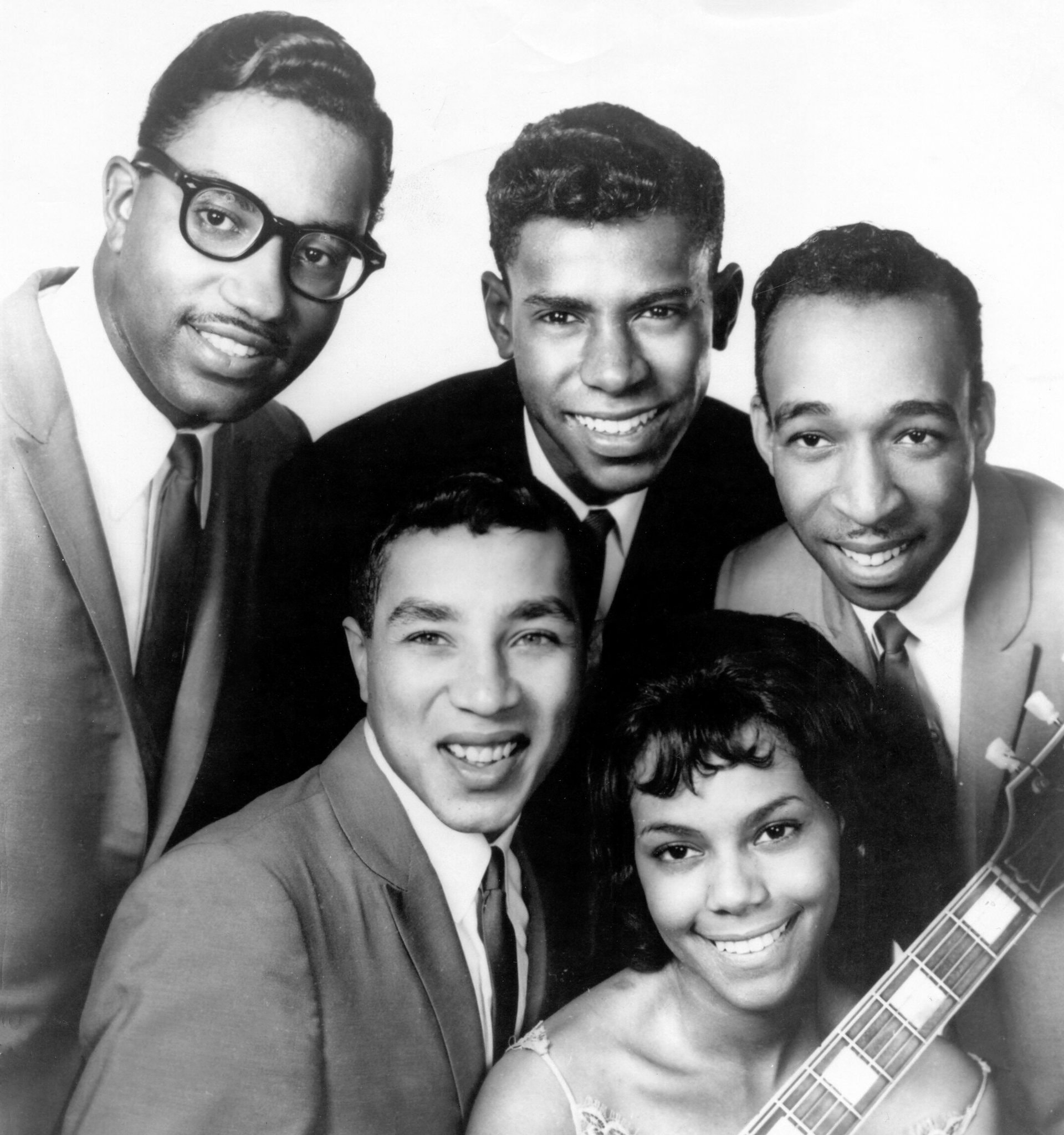
The Miracles, c. 1962. Clockwise from top left: Bobby Rogers, Marv Tarplin, Ronald White, Claudette Robinson, and Smokey Robinson.

The 1960 single "Shop Around", with Smokey Robinson on lead, was Motown's first number one hit on the R&B singles chart, and the first big hit for the Miracles. The song was also Motown's first million selling hit single. The Miracles scored many more hits over the years including the #1 classics "Tears Of A Clown", and "Love Machine".

In addition to his work in the Miracles, Rogers was a part-time Motown songwriter; his most notable composition, authored with bandmate Smokey Robinson, was The Temptations' first hit single, "The Way You Do the Things You Do". Rogers also co-wrote The Temptations' 1965 hit "My Baby", Mary Wells' hit, "What Love Has Joined Together", The Contours' 1965 hit "First I Look at the Purse", (later covered by the J. Geils Band), Marvin Gaye's 1966 Top 40 hit, "One More Heartache" and the Miracles' own 1964 Top 40 hit, "That's What Love Is Made Of", and their 1966 hit, "Going to a Go-Go". He is also noted for doing co-lead vocals on the Miracles' 1962 Top 10 smash, "You've Really Got a Hold on Me", and singing lead on the group's 1964 song, "You're So Fine And Sweet". Bobby was also reputed to be the group's best dancer, and was responsible for many of the Miracles' onstage routines, until the arrival of famed Motown choreographer Cholly Atkins.

In late 2006, Bobby re-united with original Miracles members Smokey Robinson and Pete Moore for the group's first-ever extended interview on the Motown DVD release, Smokey Robinson & the Miracles: The Definitive Performances.

Rogers continued to perform throughout the United States, Canada, and Europe with members Dave Finley, Tee Turner, and Mark Scott in the final incarnation of The Miracles, which made him, as of 2009, the longest-serving original Miracles member. On March 20, 2009, Bobby was in Hollywood to be honored along with the other surviving original members of the Miracles (Smokey Robinson, Claudette Robinson and Pete Moore) as they received a star on the Hollywood Walk of Fame. Also on hand were Gloria White, the wife of original Miracles member Ronnie White who is deceased (White is responsible for discovering Motown artist Stevie Wonder), and Billy Griffin was in attendance. He replaced Smokey Robinson when he left the group.

== Personal life and death ==
On December 18, 1963, Rogers married Wanda Young of Inkster, Michigan, a member of Motown group the Marvelettes. Together they had a son Robert Rogers III and a daughter Bobbae. Rogers and Young divorced in 1975 after twelve years of marriage. In 1981, Rogers married Joan Hughes on his forty-first birthday. The wedding ceremony was officiated by the Reverend Cecil Franklin, the brother of Aretha Franklin at Detroit's historic New Bethel Baptist Church. Bobby and Joan had two children before their marriage, daughters Gina and Kimberly. In his final years, Rogers divided his residence between his primary dwelling in Southfield, Michigan, a northern suburb of Detroit, and a Beverly Hills, California pied-à-terre.

Rogers died on March 3, 2013, at the age of 73, due to complications from diabetes. Nine days later, on March 12, 2013, on their website, The Rock and Roll Hall of Fame paid tribute to Bobby with the article, "Remembering Bobby Rogers of The Miracles".

== Awards ==
- Bobby, and each member of the Miracles (except Claudette) has been awarded the BMI award for songwriting. (Reference: Ebony, October 1971, pg 169).
- Berry Gordy's Motown Record Corporation's signature act; their first Group, and their first million selling act was the Miracles, Motown Royalty.
- Doo-Wop Hall of Fame Inductees.
- Vocal Group Hall of Fame Induction & Award.
- The Miracles received a star on the Hollywood Walk of Fame on March 20, 2009.
- Quadruple induction Rock and Roll Hall of Fame's "Songs That Shaped Rock and Roll" song List.

=== Rock and Roll Hall of Fame Induction in 2012 ===
In 1987, Smokey Robinson was inducted into the Rock and Roll Hall of Fame as a solo artist. However, in a decision that has since sparked much scrutiny, debate, and controversy, the other original members of the Miracles, Bobby Rogers, Ronnie White, Marv Tarplin, Pete Moore and Claudette Robinson, were not, at that time, inducted. This proved a source of many protests from angry Miracles fans.

On February 9, 2012, it was announced that Bobby Rogers would be inducted with the rest of the Miracles into the Rock and Roll Hall of Fame alongside Miracles lead singer Smokey Robinson. This induction occurred on April 14, 2012. After a 26-year wait, Bobby was automatically and retroactively inducted with the rest of the original Miracles, Marv Tarplin, Pete Moore, Claudette Robinson, and Ronnie White into The Rock and Roll Hall of Fame alongside Miracles lead singer Smokey Robinson. The induction was handled by a Special Committee designated by The Rock Hall in 2012, that inducted the Miracles, and five other deserving pioneering groups, that were overlooked when their lead singers were inducted into the Rock Hall many years ago. This induction occurred without the usual process of nomination and voting, under the premise that the entire group should have been inducted with Smokey Robinson back in 1987. Bobby was also inducted with the rest of the original Miracles into the Rhythm and Blues Music Hall of Fame in 2015
