= Ronnie White =

American singer (1939–1995)

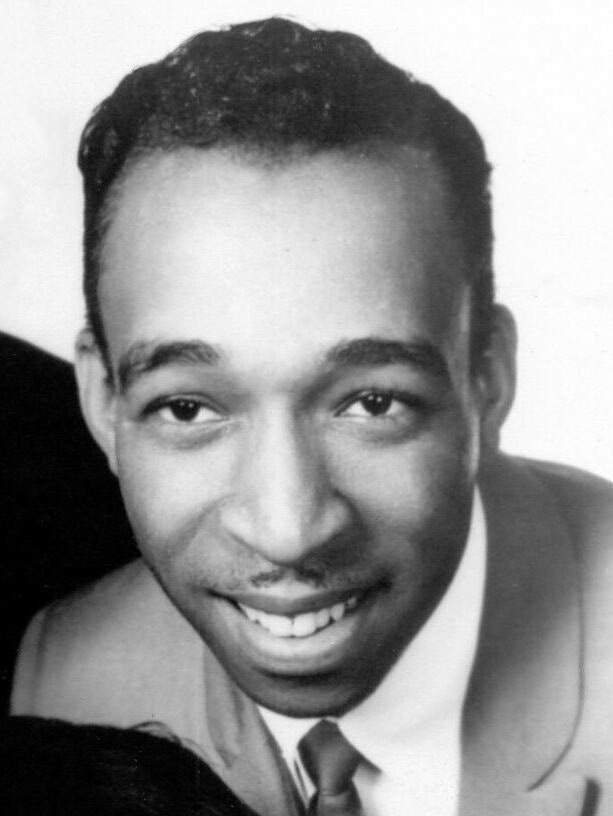
- White in 1962

Background information
- Born: Ronald Anthony White; April 5, 1938; Detroit, Michigan, U.S.
- Died: August 26, 1995 (aged 57) Detroit, Michigan, U.S.
- Genres: R&B; soul; funk; disco; doo-wop
- Occupations: Singer, songwriter
- Years active: 1955–1995
- Labels: Motown, Columbia Records

Ronald Anthony White (April 5, 1938 – August 26, 1995) was an American baritone singer, best known as the co-founder of the Miracles and its only consistent original member. White was also known for bringing Stevie Wonder to the attention of Motown Records and writing several hit singles for the Miracles as well as other artists including the Temptations, Marvin Gaye, and Mary Wells. White died of leukemia in 1995, at 57 years old. In 2012, White was a posthumous inductee into the Rock and Roll Hall of Fame with The Miracles.

== Biography ==
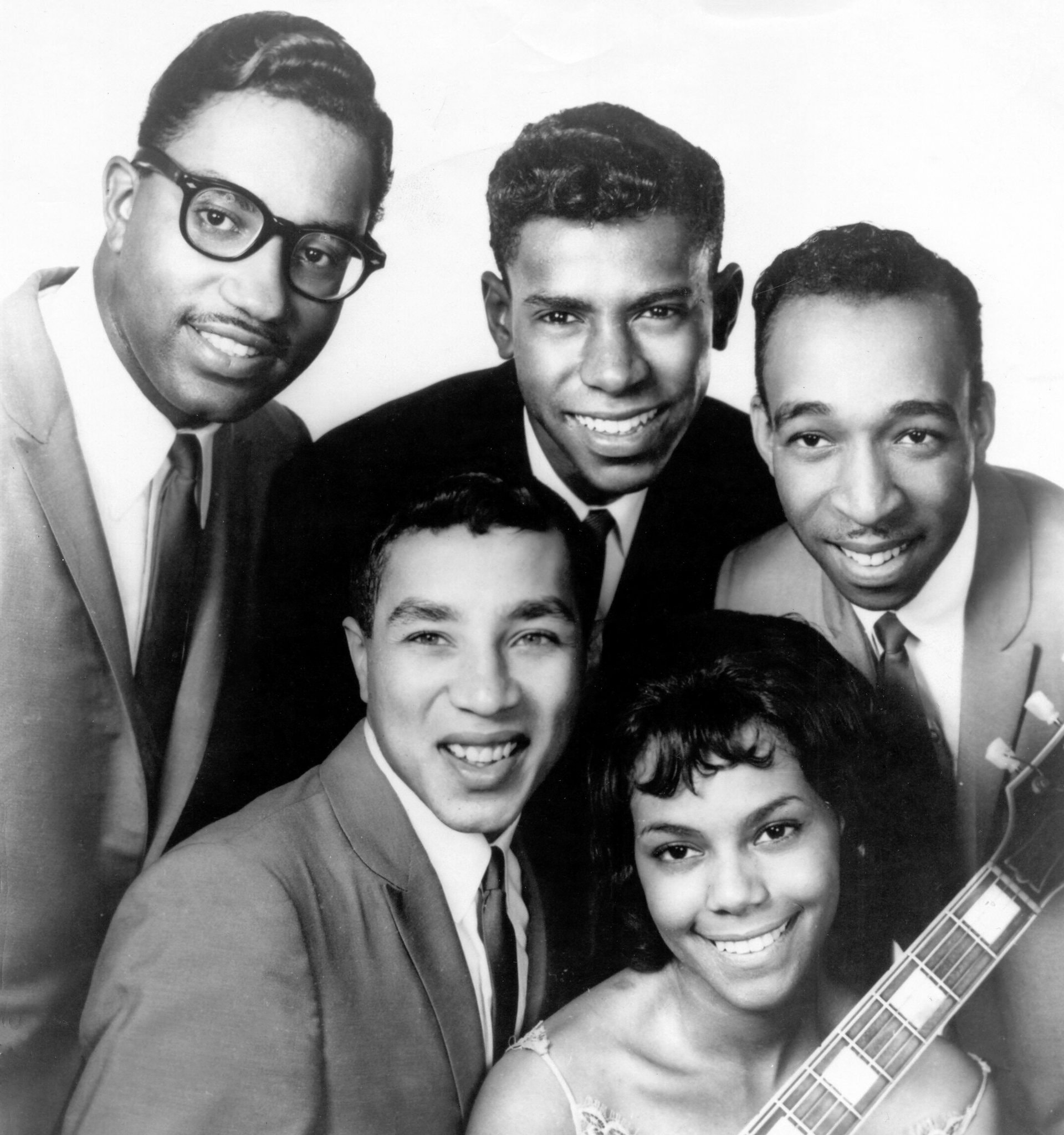
The Miracles, c. 1962. Clockwise from top left: Bobby Rogers, Marv Tarplin, White, Claudette Robinson and Smokey Robinson.

Born in Detroit, White began his friendship with fellow Miracles co-founder Smokey Robinson when they were kids. The pair started singing together when White was 12 and Robinson was 11. They were soon joined by a third boy, Pete Moore, and in 1955, the trio formed a quintet called The Matadors, with Bobby Rogers and his cousin Emerson "Sonny" Rogers. The group changed its name to The Miracles after Sonny was replaced by his sister Claudette Rogers, of the related group the Matadorettes.

The quintet began working with Berry Gordy following a failed audition with Brunswick Records and soon found fame after signing with Gordy's Motown label under the Tamla subsidiary. During the group's early years, White and Robinson performed several songs as the duo Ron & Bill. White helped Robinson compose several hit singles including The Miracles' "My Girl Has Gone", "A Fork in the Road" and also co-wrote the same group's "Don't Look Back". In addition, he co-wrote Mary Wells' "You Beat Me to the Punch", Marvin Gaye's "One More Heartache" and The Temptations classic, "My Girl", which was inducted into the Grammy Hall of Fame in 1998. White would later win awards as a songwriter from the BMI. He also brought then unknown Stevie Wonder to Motown after overhearing him playing with White's cousin; Wonder was signed immediately afterwards.

In 1966, The Miracles briefly retired from the road to work as staff songwriters and executives for the label, but returned to perform on the road the following year, in 1967. After Smokey and Claudette Robinson and long-time guitarist Marv Tarplin left the group in 1972, the group carried on with Billy Griffin as their new lead singer, scoring two more hits with Motown including the number-one smash, "Love Machine", before leaving Motown in 1977 for Columbia Records. The group disbanded in 1978 after Pete Moore opted for retirement and Billy Griffin returned to his solo career.

White and Bobby Rogers revived the Miracles in 1980 with Dave Finley and Carl Cotton, calling themselves "The New Miracles". This lasted until 1983, when White faced personal struggles following the death of his first wife, Earlyn Stephenson, who died from breast cancer that year. White announced a retirement shortly afterwards and the Miracles again disbanded. White and Rogers revived the Miracles again in 1993. From his marriage to Earlyn, he fathered two children, daughters Michelle Lynn and Pamela Claudette. He later fathered a son, Ronald Anthony, II. His only granddaughter, Maya Naomi, was born to Pamela after his death. White's first born daughter, Michelle, succumbed to leukemia at the age of 9. White would eventually fight his own battle with leukemia and died on August 26, 1995, at the age of 57.

== RRHOF controversy, The Walk of Fame, and 2012 Miracles induction ==
In 1987, Smokey Robinson was inducted into the Rock and Roll Hall of Fame as a solo artist. Controversially, Ronnie White and the other original members of The Miracles, Bobby Rogers, Marv Tarplin, Pete Moore and Claudette Robinson, were not. However, The Miracles, including White, would later be retroactively inducted into the Hall of Fame by a special committee in 2012, alongside Smokey Robinson.

White was also posthumously awarded a star on the Hollywood Walk Of Fame on March 20, 2009, along with the other original members of The Miracles. His second wife, Gloria, daughter Pamela, and granddaughter Maya were present. Ronnie White was also posthumously inducted with the rest of the original Miracles into the Rhythm and Blues Music Hall of Fame in 2005.
