= Greatest Hits, Vol. 2 (The Miracles album) =

Compilation album by The Miracles

Greatest hits album by Smokey Robinson & the Miracles
- Released: January 26, 1968
- Recorded: 1965–1967
- Genre: Soul
- Length: 32:30
- Label: Tamla
- Producer: Smokey Robinson; Brian Holland; Lamont Dozier; Frank Wilson

Smokey Robinson & the Miracles chronology
Make It Happen (1967)	Greatest Hits, Vol. 2 (1968)	Special Occasion (1968)

Singles from Greatest Hits, Vol. 2
- 1. "Come On Do the Jerk" Released: November 20, 1964; 2. "I Second That Emotion" Released: October 12, 1967

Professional ratings
Review scores
Source	Rating
Allmusic	link

Greatest Hits, Vol. 2 is the second greatest hits album for the Miracles (a.k.a. Smokey Robinson & the Miracles), released in 1968 on Motown Records' Tamla label. It contained the most popular singles from the successful Going to a Go-Go, Away We A Go-Go and Make It Happen albums of the 1965–1967 period. It also featured the 1964 non-album single "Come On Do The Jerk", and two B-sides, "Choosey Beggar" and "Save Me". The hit single "I Second That Emotion" was new to the album. This album reached the Top 10 on the Billboard 200 albums chart, peaking at #7, and peaked at #2 on Billboard's R&B album chart. Ten of the albums' 12 songs were written by Miracles members Smokey Robinson, Pete Moore, Marv Tarplin, Bobby Rogers, and Ronnie White.

Greatest Hits, Vol. 2 was voted the 166th best album of all time in Paul Gambaccini's 1978 poll of 50 prominent American and English rock critics. The album was included in Robert Christgau's "Basic Record Library" of 1950s and 1960s recordings, published in Christgau's Record Guide: Rock Albums of the Seventies (1981).

== Track listing ==
=== Side one ===
1. "Going to a Go-Go" (Smokey Robinson, Warren Moore, Robert Rogers, Marv Tarplin) 2:45
2. "The Tracks of My Tears" (Robinson, Moore, Tarplin) 2:54
3. "I Second That Emotion" (Robinson, Al Cleveland) 2:44
4. "Ooo Baby Baby" (Robinson, Moore) 2:45
5. "My Girl Has Gone" (Robinson, Moore, Tarplin, Ronald White) 2:50
6. "Come On Do The Jerk" (Robinson, Moore, White, Rogers) 2:45

=== Side two ===
1. "Whole Lot Of Shakin' In My Heart (Since I Met You)" (Frank Wilson) 2:41
2. "The Love I Saw in You Was Just a Mirage" (Robinson, Tarplin) 2:58
3. "(Come 'Round Here) I'm the One You Need" (Holland-Dozier-Holland) 2:30
4. "More Love" (Robinson) 2:44
5. "Choosey Beggar" (Robinson, Moore) 2:32
6. "Save Me" (Robinson, Rogers, Moore) 2:22

== Personnel ==
=== The Miracles ===
- Smokey Robinson – lead vocals
- Ronnie White, Bobby Rogers, Warren "Pete" Moore, Claudette Robinson – background vocals
- Marv Tarplin – guitarist

=== Other Instruments ===
- The Funk Brothers – instrumentation

=== Producers ===
- Smokey Robinson, producer, Album executive producer
- Brian Holland and Lamont Dozier, producer
- Frank Wilson, producer
