= I Like It Like That (The Miracles album) =

Studio album by the Miracles
- Released: 1964
- Recorded: 1963–1964
- Studio: Hitsville U.S.A., Detroit
- Genre: Soul
- Label: Tamla
- Producer: Smokey Robinson, Brian Holland, Lamont Dozier

The Miracles chronology
The Miracles Doin' Mickey's Monkey (1963)	I Like It Like That (1964)	Going to a Go-Go (1965)

Singles from I Like It Like That
- 1. "I Like It Like That" Released: June 3, 1964; 2. "That's What Love Is Made Of" Released: August 28, 1964

I Like It Like That is a compilation album by the American R&B group the Miracles. It was compiled for the UK market and released on the UK Tamla-Motown label in March 1965. There was no equivalent album to this in the USA. This album featured previously issued material from the group's albums and singles from the year before, The Miracles Doin' Mickey's Monkey. Songs included "I Like It Like That" (the Top 30 song, not the better-known Chris Kenner song of the same name), the Bobby Rogers-led flip side "You're So Fine and Sweet", "That's What Love Is Made Of" (another 1964 hit that the group performed on the American International Pictures release, the T.A.M.I. Show that year), and "Would I Love You", a song that became a popular regional hit tune for the group in Pennsylvania and The Midwest. The album also featured a Claudette Robinson-led cover version of the Orlons' number 2 Pop smash, "The Wah-Watusi" and the group's 1963 Top 40 Hit, "I Gotta Dance to Keep From Crying". Several of the group's other 1964 songs, including the chart hits "(You Can't Let the Boy Overpower) The Man in You", "Come On Do the Jerk", and its B-side, "Baby Don't You Go", were not included.

The 1964 recordings "I Like It Like That", "Would I Love You" and "That's What Love Is Made Of" were also included on the Miracles' 1965 album release, The Miracles Greatest Hits From The Beginning, which was the first double album released by Motown Records.

== Track listing ==
=== Side one ===
All lead vocals by Smokey Robinson, except where noted.

1. "I Like It Like That" (Smokey Robinson, Marv Tarplin)
2. "Dance What You Wanna (Sam Cooke, James Alexander, Clifton White)
3. "The Wah-Watusi" (Kal Mann, Dave Appell) (lead vocals: Claudette Robinson)
4. "Such Is Love, Such Is Life" (Robinson)
5. "The Groovy Thing" (Robinson)
6. "I Gotta Dance to Keep From Crying" (Brian Holland, Lamont Dozier, Eddie Holland)

=== Side two ===
1. "That's What Love Is Made Of" (Robinson, Bobby Rogers, Pete Moore)
2. "The Monkey Time" (Curtis Mayfield)
3. "You're So Fine and Sweet" (Robinson, Rogers, Moore, Ronnie White, Tarplin, Don Whited) (lead vocals: Bobby Rogers)
4. "Would I Love You" (Robinson)
5. "Dancin' Holiday" (Diane Rogers, Fred Smith, Zelda Samuels)
6. "Twist and Shout" (Bert Berns, Phil Medley)

== Personnel ==
=== The Miracles ===
- Smokey Robinson – lead and background vocals
- Claudette Robinson – lead and background vocals
- Marv Tarplin – guitar
- Pete Moore – background vocals
- Bobby Rogers – lead and background vocals
- Ronnie White – background vocals

=== Additional personnel ===
- The Funk Brothers - instrumentation
