= Rosetta Hightower =

American singer

- Also known as: Rosetta Hightower Green
- Born: Rosetta Jeanette Hightower; 23 June 1944; Philadelphia, Pennsylvania, U.S.
- Died: 2 August 2014 (aged 70) Clapham, London, England
- Genres: R&B, pop
- Occupation: Singer
- Instrument: Vocals
- Labels: CBS, Toast, Rivera, Polydor
- Formerly of: The Orlons

Rosetta Jeanette Hightower (23 June 1944 – 2 August 2014) was an American singer and the lead singer of the 1960s girl group The Orlons. She was born in Philadelphia.

== Background ==
As lead singer of The Orlons, the Orlons recorded several Top 10 U.S. hits between 1962 and 1964, including "The Wah-Watusi", "Don't Hang Up", "South Street", and "Not Me". In early 1962, The Orlons provided backing vocals on Dee Dee Sharp's "Mashed Potato Time" (No. 2 pop, No. 1 R&B). That spring, they recorded "The Wah-Watusi" which, in July 1962, made it in the Billboard charts to the No. 2 spot. Around the same time, they recorded back-up vocals on Dee Dee Sharp's second hit, "Gravy (For My Mashed Potatoes)" which went to No. 9. The follow-up to "The Wah-Watusi", "Don't Hang Up" reached No. 4 pop and No. 3 R&B in the fall and winter of 1962. The Orlons' first major performance was at New York's Apollo Theatre with The Crystals, Bob B. Soxx and the Blue Jeans, Chuck Jackson, Tommy Hunt, and Gene Chandler. In 1963, they had hits with "South Street" (No. 3 Pop, No. 4 R&B) and "Crossfire" (No. 19 Pop, No. 25 R&B).

Hightower left the group in the late 1960s to pursue a solo career in the UK. She joined the ranks of the then-popular female session singers who backed many hit songs. This group included Madeline Bell, Lesley Duncan, Kiki Dee, and Sue and Sunny. She recorded with Joe Cocker on his With a Little Help From My Friends album.

== Career ==
In 1968, Hightower released the single, "I Can't Give Back the Love I Feel for You" bw "Big Bird" on Toast TT 509.

Moving permanently to England in 1970, Hightower married musician-producer Ian Green. She represented the US in Belgium for the first international singing contest held. She released numerous singles and at least two albums. In 1971, she was a backing vocalist for John Lennon's "Power to the People".

== Death ==
Rosetta Hightower Green died in Clapham, London, on 2 August 2014, aged 70. Her son, Ian Green, Jr., works as Paul Oakenfold's main co-producer and remixer.
