= Come Spy with Me (song) =

1967 song recorded by The Miracles

- Dutch release picture sleeve

Single by Smokey Robinson & the Miracles

from the album Make It Happen
- B-side: "The Love I Saw in You Was Just a Mirage"
- Released: January 27, 1967
- Recorded: Hitsville USA (Studio A): November 11, 1966
- Genre: Soul, pop, psychedelic soul
- Label: Tamla; T 54145
- Songwriter(s): Smokey Robinson; Marvin Tarplin
- Producer(s): Smokey Robinson; Warren "Pete" Moore

Smokey Robinson & the Miracles singles chronology
"(Come 'Round Here) I'm the One You Need" (1966)	"Come Spy with Me" (1967)	"More Love" (1967)

"Come Spy With Me" (T54145) was a 1967 song recorded by Motown Records R&B group The Miracles, released on its Tamla Records subsidiary label. The B-side of the group's Top 20 hit single "The Love I Saw in You Was Just a Mirage", it was written by Miracles lead singer Smokey Robinson, and was the original titular theme song from the 1967 20th Century Fox feature film of the same name, starring Troy Donahue and Andrea Dromm.

This song, recorded by the group in June 1966, was released the following year and was a regional hit, though not charting nationally, and did not appear on any original Miracles studio album, but since its original release, has been included in The Miracles' 1994 35th Anniversary box set collection.

== Personnel ==
=== The Miracles ===
- Smokey Robinson – Lead vocals
- Claudette Robinson – Soprano vocals
- Bobby Rogers – Tenor vocals
- Ronnie White – Baritone vocals
- Pete Moore – Bass vocals
- Marv Tarplin – Guitar
