= I Like It Like That (The Miracles song) =

1964 single by the Miracles

Single by The Miracles

from the album I Like It Like That
- B-side: "You're So Fine and Sweet"
- Released: June 3, 1964
- Recorded: Hitsville U.S.A. (Studio A); April 30, and May 12, 1964
- Genre: Soul
- Length: 2:29
- Label: Tamla; T 54098
- Songwriter(s): Smokey Robinson, Marv Tarplin
- Producer(s): Smokey Robinson

The Miracles singles chronology
"(You Can't Let the Boy Overpower) The Man in You" (1964)	"I Like It Like That" (1964)	"That's What Love Is Made Of" (1964)

"I Like It Like That" was a 1964 hit song by Motown group The Miracles on its Tamla label subsidiary. This is not the Chris Kenner hit song of the same name but a Miracles original, written by Miracles members Smokey Robinson and Marv Tarplin, and is included on the group's first greatest hits album, Greatest Hits from the Beginning. It was also the title song from their deleted 1964 album of the same name.

== Background ==
Like many of the Miracles' hit songs, "I Like It Like That" begins with Tarplin's guitar. It has a "live party" feel, similar to their earlier 1963 hit, "Mickey's Monkey". Smokey encourages everybody to "clap your hands now, everybody, we're gonna have some fun tonight...we're gonna sing and shout...knock ourselves out...and everything's gonna be alright". The other Miracles, Bobby, Ronnie, Pete and Claudette, join in with their trademark harmony vocals, with chants of "alright", and "I like it like that" as The Funk Brothers add additional instruments to the mix.

Cash Box described it as "an infectious rhythmic shuffle-thumper...that sports a 'live' audience cheer and handclap support."

"I Like It Like That" was released during a period (1964) when Smokey and the Miracles were so busy touring as the headline act with the famed Motortown Revue shows, and writing big hits for other Motown acts, principally Mary Wells and The Temptations, that their own chart action suffered. Of the group's four single releases that year (the others were "Come On Do The Jerk", "(You Can't Let the Boy Overpower) The Man in You" and "That's What Love Is Made Of"), "I Like It Like That" was the only one to enter the Billboard Pop Top 30, while two songs that they wrote for the two aforementioned acts, "My Guy" and "My Girl" respectively, both reached No.1. "My Girl" was originally intended to be recorded by The Miracles. However, The following year, 1965, would prove to be The Miracles' biggest year ever.

== Personnel ==
The Miracles:

- Smokey Robinson - lead vocals
- Bobby Rogers, Ronnie White, Pete Moore, Claudette Robinson - background vocals
- Marv Tarplin - guitar
- Additional instruments: The Funk Brothers

== Chart history ==
"I Like It Like That" reached the Top 30 of the Billboard Pop chart, charting at No.27 and the Top 10 of Cash Box R&B chart, peaking at No.10. (Billboard Magazine's R&B chart was temporarily suspended during this time).

Chart (1964)	Peak position
U.S. Billboard Hot 100	27
Canada RPM Top 40-5s	37

== Cover versions ==
"I Like It Like That" has been covered by:

- Bobby Vee
- Mitch Ryder & the Detroit Wheels.
- The song's B side, "You're So Fine And Sweet", featured a rare lead by the Miracles' second tenor, Bobby Rogers (who had sung co-lead vocals with Smokey on the group's smash single "You've Really Got A Hold On Me" the previous year), and inspired a cover version by The Undertakers.
