= Come Spy with Me =

Come Spy with Me may refer to:

- Come Spy with Me (film), a 1967 American film
- "Come Spy with Me" (song), the title song of the film by The Miracles
- Come Spy with Me, a 1966 West End musical by Bryan Blackburn; see List of musicals by composer: A to L
- Come Spy with Me, a 1966 album of themes from spy movies and TV shows by Hugo Montenegro and His Orchestra
- "Come Spy with Me", an episode of Wow! Wow! Wubbzy!
