= Greatest Hits: From the Beginning (The Miracles album) =

Greatest Hits from the Beginning

Greatest hits album by the Miracles
- Released: March 22, 1965
- Recorded: 1958–1964
- Genre: Soul
- Length: 61:10
- Label: Tamla; TS2-254
- Producer: Smokey Robinson, Berry Gordy, Jr., Brian Holland, Lamont Dozier

The Miracles chronology
The Miracles Doin' Mickey's Monkey (1963)	Greatest Hits from the Beginning (1965)	Going to a Go-Go (1965)

Greatest Hits from the Beginning is a compilation double LP by the Miracles released in 1965. This was the first double album ever released by the Motown Record Corporation (Tamla TS2-254). It covers most of the group's hits from their pre-1965 albums, such as "Shop Around", "Who's Lovin’ You", "You've Really Got A Hold On Me" and "Mickey's Monkey", as well as the non-album singles from 1964: "I Like It Like That" and "That's What Love Is Made Of" (with its B-side ballad "Would I Love You"). The album was a success, reaching #21 on the Billboard Pop Album Chart. It was also the first Miracles album to chart on the Billboard R&B Album chart, where it was an even bigger success, peaking at #2.

The compilation also includes the group's early non-Motown singles in addition to their releases on Motown's Tamla label. "Got A Job" and "I Cry" were originally issued on End in 1958, while "Bad Girl" and "I Need a Change" were issued on Chess Records in 1959. "Bad Girl" was reissued by Motown the same year. The B-sides from all four non-Motown singles are also included.

However, this is not a complete collection of the group's pre-1960 singles. The single, "It" and its B-side, "Don't Say Bye Bye", which was originally issued on Argo and credited to Ron and Bill (aka. Ronnie White and Bill "William Smokey" Robinson) were omitted. Other early charting singles missing are "Broken Hearted", "Ain't It Baby", "Mighty Good Lovin'", "(You Can't Let the Boy Overpower) The Man in You", "Come On Do The Jerk", and "Everybody's Gotta Pay Some Dues". This album was released on CD in 1991, but has since gone out of print.

Professional ratings
Review scores
Source	Rating
AllMusic	4.5/5 stars

== Track listing ==
=== LP 1 ===
==== Side one ====
1. "Got a Job" (Smokey Robinson, Tyrone Carlo, Berry Gordy)
2. "I Cry" (Robinson, Gordy)
3. "Mama Done Told Me" (Robinson, Gordy, Carlo)
4. "(I Need Some) Money" (Robinson, Gordy)
5. "Bad Girl" (Robinson, Gordy)

==== Side two ====
1. "I Love Your Baby" (Robinson, Gordy)
2. "I Need a Change" (Robinson, Gordy)
3. "All I Want Is You" (Robinson, Gordy)
4. "(You Can) Depend on Me" (Robinson, Gordy)
5. "Who's Lovin' You" (Robinson)

=== LP 2 ===
==== Side one ====
1. "That's What Love Is Made Of" (Robinson, Bobby Rogers, Pete Moore)
2. "Mickey's Monkey" (Holland-Dozier-Holland)
3. "I Gotta Dance to Keep From Crying" (Holland-Dozier-Holland)
4. "You've Really Got a Hold on Me" (Robinson)
5. "I Like It Like That" (Robinson, Marv Tarplin)
6. "A Love She Can Count On" (Robinson)

==== Side two ====
1. "Shop Around" (Robinson, Gordy)
2. "Way Over There" (Robinson)
3. "I've Been Good to You" (Robinson)
4. "Would I Love You" (Robinson)
5. "I'll Try Something New" (Robinson)
6. "What's So Good About Goodbye" (Robinson)

== Personnel ==
=== The Miracles ===
- Smokey Robinson - lead vocals
- Ronnie White - backing vocals
- Bobby Rogers - backing vocals (harmony co-lead vocals on "You've Really Got A Hold on Me")
- Warren "Pete" Moore - backing vocals, lead vocals and vocal arrangements
- Claudette Robinson - lead vocals, backing vocals
- Marv Tarplin - guitar

=== Other personnel ===
- The Funk Brothers: instrumentation

== Producers ==
- Berry Gordy, Jr.: producer, album executive producer
- William "Smokey" Robinson, Jr.: producer, album executive producer
- Brian Holland, Lamont Dozier: producer
