= Fathom (1967 film) =

British film by Leslie H. Martinson

- Theatrical release poster by Tom Chantrell
- Directed by: Leslie H. Martinson
- Screenplay by: Lorenzo Semple Jr.
- Based on: Fathom Heavensent (unpublished novel) by Larry Forrester
- Produced by: John Kohn
- Starring: Raquel Welch; Anthony Franciosa; Ronald Fraser; Richard Briers
- Cinematography: Douglas Slocombe
- Edited by: Max Benedict
- Music by: John Dankworth
- Production company: Twentieth Century-Fox Productions Ltd (uncredited)
- Distributed by: Twentieth Century-Fox Film Corporation
- Release date: 24 August 1967 (London)
- Running time: 99 minutes
- Country: United Kingdom
- Language: English
- Budget: $2,225,000
- Box office: $1,000,000 (US/ Canada)

Fathom is a 1967 British spy comedy film directed by Leslie H. Martinson, starring Raquel Welch and Anthony Franciosa.

The film was based on Larry Forrester's second Fathom novel Fathom Heavensent, then in the draft stage but never published. His first was 1967's A Girl Called Fathom.

This was one of three 1967 20th Century Fox films about female spies, the others being Doris Day's Caprice and Andrea Dromm's Come Spy with Me. Writer Lorenzo Semple said "It could have been very good. It's so confused. I watched it a couple of times, and I really didn't know what was gonna happen! I didn't know who done it or what they'd done!"

== Plot ==
Fathom Harvill, a skydiver, is in Spain with a U.S. parachute team. She accepts a lift from a man called Timothy and is taken to see Douglas Campbell, who convinces her that he is a British agent working for NATO and wants Fathom to help him find a triggering mechanism for a nuclear weapon that has gone missing in the Mediterranean. He tells her that the device is hidden inside an ancient Chinese figurine known as the Fire Dragon. Following Campbell's plan, Fathom skydives into the villa of Peter Merriwether, who has a Chinese assistant, Jo-May Soon, and is also searching for the figurine. She finds a dead body and is caught by Merriwether, who accuses her of the murder.

Fathom convinces Merriwether that she is innocent. He tells her that the nuclear weapon story was a ruse, the Fire Dragon was stolen from a Far East museum by a Korean War deserter, Merriwether is a private investigator, and Campbell is the deserter. Also in hot pursuit of the figurine is Serapkin, a rich Armenian private collector who wants it for himself.

After fending off a knife attack and another from a harpoon, Fathom chances upon the figurine in her makeup case. Campbell now convinces her that he is the trustworthy one and Merriwether the deserter. Fathom boards a plane with him and Timothy, but they promptly attempt to toss her from it with a defective parachute. Merriwether catches up with them in another plane and the two pilots have a duel in the air, trying to force the other down into the sea. Merriwether shoots Campbell dead. When Timothy produces a gun, Fathom fights him for it, leading to Timothy falling out of the plane. Now revealed as the good guy, Merriwether, with the leverage of Fathom's passport which he has, persuades her—after she passes over the villa and tosses the Fire Dragon down to Jo-May Soon to return it to China—to meet him later in a bar.

== Cast ==
- Raquel Welch as Fathom Harvill
- Anthony Franciosa as Peter Merriwether
- Ronald Fraser as Col. Douglas Campbell, Chief of HADES
- Richard Briers as Flight Lt. Timothy Webb
- Greta Chi as Maj. Jo-May Soon (Chinese Secret Service)
- Tom Adams as Mike, Owner of Casa Miguel
- Élisabeth Ercy as Ulla
- Ann Lancaster as Mrs. Trivers
- Tutte Lemkow as Mehmed, Serapkin's servant
- Reg Lye as Mr. Trivers
- Clive Revill as Sergi Serapkin

== Production ==
=== Development ===
The film was made by 20th Century Fox to cash in on the film adaptation of the comic strip Modesty Blaise, which featured a female secret agent. It was written by Lorenzo Semple Jr and directed by Leslie Martinson who had just made the film of the TV show Batman. Semple says the studio were attracted by the fact that he and Martinson had made Batman so quickly and cheaply.

Semple said "Fox bought a novel called FATHOM, about a big, tall girl. She was called Fathom because she was six feet tall. They thought that would be their Modesty Blaise."

He wrote the script in Boris Karloff's old house. Semple wrote the first twenty pages "making it up as I went along... I made every page exciting".

Semple says he sent the first twenty pages to Fox and David Brown and Richard Zanuck liked it. They gave it to John Koch, who they wanted to produce. Koch insisted on writing the script with Semple line by line.

The lead was given to Raquel Welch, who was only 5 feet, 6 inches tall, so they had to make up explanations of why she was called Fathom. She was a 20th Century Fox contractee who had leapt to fame with Fantastic Voyage and One Million Years B.C.. This inspired Fox to give her her first starring vehicle.

Semple recalled "The movie MODESTY BLAISE came out and it was a spectacular flop. So that cooled off the whole project, they were stuck with it."

=== Filming ===
Filming started September 1966. It was shot in Cártama, Mijas, Málaga, Torremolinos, Nerja, in Andalucía, Spain and Shepperton Studios, Shepperton, Surrey, England. Semple says that Welch and Martinson had a fight on the first day of filming and never spoke throughout the rest of the shoot.

Semple also said "Franco was still in command then, there were a lot of things in the script they didn't like, so a lot of the script was thrown away on the first days shooting."

Second unit director Peter Medak later said of working with Welch:

She was at that time quite inexperienced, exactly like one of those American drum majorettes. But she tried very hard and went to see the rushes each day, gradually improving. 'Who's this dumb broad?' people used to say. But I said: 'You wait. I'll bet she made it.' I liked her very much because she was such a genuine person. And she had a beautiful body which always helps.

"I played a blown up Barbie doll", said Welch later. "I have never appeared completely nude but I don't condemn people who do."

Shortly after filming ended Welch announced she would marry her manager, Patrick Curtis.

=== Music ===
All the film's musical score was composed by John Dankworth. An official soundtrack was released in 1967 in the United States by 20th Century Fox Records and Stateside Records in the U.K. on an 11-track vinyl. It was reissued on CD by Harkit Records as a twelve track in 2009.

== Release ==
The film was released in the United States on 9 August 1967 and in London on 24 August 1967. The U.K. theatrical release was cut with the British Board of Film Classification giving a U (Universal) Suitable for all rating.

== Reception ==
=== Box office ===
According to Fox records, the film needed to earn $3,875,000 in rentals to break even and made $3,295,000, meaning it made a loss. Semple says it was "meant to be a series, but it was killed."

=== Critical response ===
The Monthly Film Bulletin wrote: "This comedy-thriller from the director of Batman belongs not in the category of High Camp but in that of Good Wholesome Fun. It manages to impart a charm and freshness to all the best worn clichés of the spy film send-up, partly because – between the lazy falling of billowing scarlet parachutes with which it opens, and the graceful ballet for two planes with which it ends – it moves at a dizzying pace, but also because it is quite simply a pretty film to watch. But Fathom's biggest surprise is Raquel Welch, who gives an enchanting performance as the heroine, an amateur Modesty Blaise who wears the shortest of skirts and the lowest of necklines but exudes an air of bewildered indignation when anyone so much as tries to kiss her. Clive Revill is suitably sinister as Serapkin, whose abnormally low body temperature requires him to wear an off-white body-stocking even in his most amorous moments. The dialogue is corny, and the plot absurd, but it doesn't really seem to matter."

The Los Angeles Times film critic said that "each new Raquel Welch picture brings further proof that when Maria Montez died they didn't break the mold. Like Maria, Raquel can't act from here to there, but both ladies seem to have been born to be photographed... this sappiest of spy pictures."

The New York Times called it "crackling good fun" and said, "Somewhere between her unfortunate arrival in the revival of One Million Years B.C. and the new film...Miss Welch has learned to act."

Variety wrote: "Miss Welch is fascinating to watch and Franciosa, mebbe a good guy, mebbe a baddie, handles himself with competency. Ronald Fraser plays the Scotsman and Clive Revill is called upon to overplay a mysterious character named Serapkin, one of those out to get the Fire Dragon. Richard Briers, Greta Chi and Tom Adams lend able support. Technical credits are exceptionally well executed, particularly the parachute sequences devised by Ken Vos and filmed by Jacques Dubourg. Regular photography by Douglas Slocombe is interesting, as is art direction by Maurice Carter, and Max Benedict's editing is fluid. Music score by John Dankworth furnishes melodic backing."

== See also ==
- List of American films of 1967
