= Dromm =

Dromm is a surname. Notable people with the surname include:

- Andrea Dromm (born 1941), American actress
- Daniel Dromm (born 1955), American politician
