= Don't Hang Up =

Don't Hang Up may refer to:

- "Don't Hang Up" (song), a 1962 single by the R&B music group The Orlons
- "Don't Hang Up", a song on 10cc's 1976 album How Dare You!
- "Don't Hang Up", a song on Britney Spears's 2003 album In the Zone
- "Don't Hang Up", a song on Ringo Starr's 2005 album Choose Love
- Don't Hang Up (film), a 2016 horror-thriller film
