= The Miracles Doin' Mickey's Monkey =

Studio album by the Miracles
- Released: November 11, 1963
- Studio: Hitsville USA, Detroit
- Genre: Soul, pop
- Length: 28:42
- Label: Tamla
- Producer: Brian Holland, Lamont Dozier, Smokey Robinson

The Miracles chronology
Christmas with The Miracles (1963)	The Miracles Doin' Mickey's Monkey (1963)	I Like It Like That (1964)

Singles from The Miracles Doin' Mickey's Monkey
- 1. "Mickey's Monkey" Released: July 26, 1963; 2. "I Gotta Dance to Keep from Crying" Released: October 31, 1963

Professional ratings
Review scores
Source	Rating
AllMusic	3/5 stars
The Encyclopedia of Popular Music	3/5 stars
The Rolling Stone Album Guide	4/5 stars

The Miracles Doin' Mickey's Monkey is the sixth studio album by the American R&B group the Miracles. It was released on November 11, 1963, on Motown's Tamla label. It includes the group's Top 10 smash single "Mickey's Monkey", written and produced by Holland–Dozier–Holland, which was later recorded by several other artists. "Mickey's Monkey" popularized "The Monkey" as a novelty dance. Also included is another H-D-H dance-oriented single, "I Gotta Dance to Keep From Crying", a Billboard Top 40 hit. The album peaked at No. 113 on the Billboard 200.

Much of the rest of the album is made up of popular dance songs, including "The Twist", "Twist and Shout" and The Contours' Motown hit "Do You Love Me". Miracles member Bobby Rogers co-wrote a song, "Dancin' Holiday", for the album. Miracle Claudette Robinson takes the lead on the Miracles' remake of The Orlons hit, "The Wah-Watusi".

The Miracles Doin' Mickey's Monkey was released on CD by Motown Records in 1986, in a two-for-one set with their Away We A Go-Go album, and again by itself in a 1992 release.

== Cover art ==
The album cover art is by Stanley Mouse; it was the artist's first album assignment. Berry Gordy often chose not to use pictures of his performers on the album covers of Motown's early releases, in order that the label not be defined strictly as a "black" record company.

== Track listing ==
=== Side one ===
1. "Mickey's Monkey" (Holland-Dozier-Holland) – 2:46
2. "Dance What You Wanna" (James Alexander, Sam Cooke, Clifton White) – 2:45
3. "The Wah-Watusi" (Dave Appell, Kal Mann) – 2:38
4. "The Twist" (Hank Ballard) – 2:29
5. "Dancin' Holiday" (Diane Rogers, Fred Smith, Zelda Samuels) – 2:14
6. "Land of a Thousand Dances" (Chris Kenner) – 2:26

=== Side two ===
1. "I Gotta Dance to Keep From Crying" (Holland-Dozier-Holland) – 2:39
2. "The Monkey Time" (Curtis Mayfield) – 2:51
3. "The Groovey Thing" (Smokey Robinson) – 2:43
4. "Twist and Shout" (Phil Medley, Bert Russell) – 2:03
5. "Do You Love Me" (Berry Gordy, Jr.) – 2:39

== Personnel ==
The Miracles

- Smokey Robinson - lead vocals
- Claudette Rogers Robinson - lead vocals (on "The Wah-Watusi"), background vocals
- Bobby Rogers - background vocals
- Ronnie White - background vocals
- Pete Moore - background vocals
- Marv Tarplin - guitar

Production

- The Funk Brothers - instrumentation
- Smokey Robinson - producer
- Brian Holland - producer
- Lamont Dozier - producer
