= Beggars and Choosers =

Beggars and Choosers may refer to:

- Beggars and Choosers, a 1994 novel by Nancy Kress
- Beggars and Choosers (TV series), a 1999-2000 American comedy-drama series
- "Beggars and Choosers", a song by Soul Asylum from Hang Time
- Choosey Beggar, song
