= The Love I Saw in You Was Just a Mirage =

- Dutch release picture sleeve

Single by Smokey Robinson & the Miracles

from the album Make It Happen
- B-side: "Come Spy with Me"
- Released: January 27, 1967
- Recorded: Hitsville USA (Studio A): November 11, 1966
- Genre: Soul, pop, psychedelic soul
- Length: 2:59
- Label: Tamla; T 54145
- Songwriter(s): Smokey Robinson; Marvin Tarplin
- Producer(s): Smokey Robinson; Warren "Pete" Moore

Smokey Robinson & the Miracles singles chronology
"(Come 'Round Here) I'm the One You Need" (1966)	"The Love I Saw in You Was Just a Mirage" (1967)	"More Love" (1967)

"The Love I Saw in You Was Just a Mirage" is a 1967 song recorded by the American R&B group The Miracles on Motown Records' Tamla label. Written by Miracles members Smokey Robinson and Marv Tarplin and produced by Robinson, it is noted for being the first single to bill the group as "Smokey Robinson" & the Miracles, a billing already present on the group's albums by this time. Group members Smokey Robinson and Pete Moore were the song's producers.

== Personnel ==
=== The Miracles ===
- Lead vocals by Smokey Robinson
- Background vocals by Claudette Rogers Robinson, Pete Moore, Ronnie White and Bobby Rogers
- Guitar by Marv Tarplin

=== Other personnel ===
- Other instrumentation by The Funk Brothers

== Lyric content and chart history ==
The single was a Top 20 hit on the Billboard Hot 100, and a Top 10 hit on Billboard's R&B singles chart. As with several of the Miracles' hits, "Mirage" begins with Tarplin's guitar and he plays the riff on a 12-string acoustic guitar. The song's lyrics feature Robinson's character as a man deceived by the beauty of a woman who showed "the promise of love", but then sadly discovered that her love was "just a mirage".

Cash Box called the single a "driving R&B workout that should get a lot of play."

Chart (1967)	Peak position
US Billboard Hot 100	20
US Billboard Top Selling R&B Singles	10

== Films and cover versions ==
- The Jackson 5, Vance Gilbert and The Uniques are among the acts who have recorded cover versions of "The Love I Saw in You Was Just a Mirage".
- The original 45 RPM single had The Miracles' "Come Spy with Me", (the original theme song to the 1967 20th Century Fox film of the same name), as the B-side.
- The hit "A" side, The Miracles' "The Love I Saw In You Was Just A Mirage," was also used in a film, the soundtrack of the 1980 crime drama, "American Gigolo" starring Richard Gere. Gere actually sang along to The Miracles' original recording in the film.
