= That's What Love Is Made Of =

- Dutch release picture sleeve

Single by The Miracles

from the album I Like It Like That & Greatest Hits from the Beginning
- B-side: "Would I Love You"
- Released: August 28, 1964
- Recorded: August 11, 1964
- Studio: Hitsville U.S.A. (Studio A), Detroit, Michigan
- Genre: Soul
- Length: 2:58
- Label: Tamla
- Songwriter(s): Smokey Robinson, Bobby Rogers, Warren Moore
- Producer(s): Smokey Robinson

The Miracles singles chronology
"I Like It Like That" (1964)	"That's What Love Is Made Of" (1964)	"Come On Do The Jerk" (1964)

"That's What Love Is Made Of" is a 1964 hit song by Motown's original vocal group, the Miracles, issued on the label's Tamla records subsidiary. It was taken from the group's album Greatest Hits from the Beginning, but originally appeared on their abortive 1964 album, I Like It Like That.

Written by Miracles members Smokey Robinson, Bobby Rogers, and Pete Moore, this song was a Billboard Top 40 Pop hit, peaking at number 35, and a Top 10 Billboard R&B hit, peaking at number nine. A showcase for poetic wordplay, the Miracles utilized several famous nursery rhymes in this song; in fact, the song's title itself is a variation of the rhyme "What Are Little Girls/Little Boys Made Of?" and parts of this famous rhyme were incorporated into the lyrics of this song, which, like many Miracles songs, starts with the guitar licks of Miracles member Marv Tarplin. Robinson, as the lead singer, serves as the song's narrator:

You take Sugar and Spice
Everything Nice
and you've got a little girl, yeah, yeah
You take Snakes and Snails
Puppy Dog's tails
and you've got a little boy, yeah, yeah
That's what Love Is Made Of

While Tarplin plays and Robinson sings the lyrics, the other Miracles (Bobby Rogers, Ronnie White, Pete Moore and Claudette Robinson, answer in classic call-and-response style.

Billboard stated that the song has a "good lyric line, great hand clappin' beat and mighty good on-frantic performance by the group." Cash Box described it as "an inviting shuffle thumper...that the artists serve up with a rhythmic delight."

The Miracles performed this song before a live audience at the Santa Monica Civic Auditorium on the 1964 American International Pictures film, The T.A.M.I. Show. Present on stage were Robinson, Tarplin, Rogers, White and Moore. Although present on the original recording, Miracle Claudette Robinson, who was married to Smokey Robinson, was not present at the concert. She had retired from onstage and TV performances earlier that year for health reasons, after touring caused her to have miscarriages, but she continued singing on their records as a non-touring member of the Miracles.

The Miracles' "That's What Love Is Made Of" has inspired cover versions by Michael Jackson, Bobby Vee, Choker Campbell, and the Magicians, and has appeared on many Miracles "Greatest Hits" albums and CD Anthologies. This Miracles song also inspired a cover version by Len Barry. The song's flip side was the popular regional Miracles hit tune, "Would I Love You", which was included on Greatest Hits from the Beginning, but did not appear on CD until 1996's Early Classics. Both sides of this single received extended stereo mixes on the 2002 compilation Ooo Baby Baby: The Anthology.

== Credits and personnel ==
The Miracles

- Smokey Robinson – lead vocals
- Claudette Robinson – backing vocals
- Pete Moore – backing vocals
- Bobby Rogers – backing vocals
- Ronnie White – backing vocals
- Marv Tarplin – lead guitar

Additional musicians

- The Funk Brothers
