= I Gotta Dance to Keep from Crying =

Single by The Miracles

from the album The Miracles Doin' Mickey's Monkey
- B-side: "Such Is Love, Such Is Life"
- Released: October 31, 1963
- Recorded: 1963
- Genre: Rock; soul
- Length: 2:39
- Label: Motown
- Songwriter: Holland–Dozier–Holland
- Producers: Brian Holland, Lamont Dozier

The Miracles singles chronology
"Mickey's Monkey" (1963)	"I Gotta Dance to Keep from Crying" (1963)	"The Christmas Song" (1963)

"I Gotta Dance to Keep from Crying" is a 1963 hit by the Miracles on Motown's Tamla label. It was written and produced by Motown's main songwriting team, Brian Holland, Lamont Dozier, and Eddie Holland.

== Background ==
"I Gotta Dance to Keep from Crying" was the follow-up to the group's Top 10 pop hit, "Mickey's Monkey", also written by Holland, Dozier and Holland. The smash success of that song, according to Motown policy, automatically gave Holland-Dozier-Holland the green light to write and produce the Miracles' next release, which resulted in this song. Like "Mickey's Monkey", "I Gotta Dance to Keep from Crying" features a "live party" feel. The song's title is a play on the old expression, "I Gotta Laugh to Keep from Crying", highlighting the all-too-human tendency to escape from heartbreak or personal pain by dancing, laughing and having a good time. Miracles lead singer Smokey Robinson, as the song's narrator, portrays a young man trying to get over the heartbreak of a recent breakup with his girl:

Gather 'round me, swingers and friends
Help me forget my hurt within
I lost the only girl I've ever loved
The only one I'm thinking of
And I've gotta dance to keep from crying

Cash Box described it as "an infectious rocker that the pro belters deliver in their inimitable, ultra-commercial manner."

Holland-Dozier-Holland later wrote another Top 20 hit for the Miracles in 1966, "(Come 'Round Here) I'm the One You Need", which was the last song to bill the group as "the Miracles" before their name was officially changed to "Smokey Robinson and the Miracles". "I Gotta Dance to Keep from Crying" has inspired cover versions by the Who and Jimmy James, and was included on the group's albums The Miracles Doin' Mickey's Monkey, I Like It Like That (withdrawn from the U.S.), Greatest Hits from the Beginning, and several other Miracles "greatest hits" albums and CD anthologies. However, the original stereo version of this song (as found on Greatest Hits from the Beginning and other compilations) does not fade out the background music towards the end of the song, as it does in the single version. This is corrected in the stereo mix found in 2002's Ooo Baby Baby: The Anthology.

== Personnel ==
The Miracles

- Smokey Robinson – lead vocals
- Bobby Rogers – background vocals
- Marv Tarplin – guitar
- Claudette Robinson – background vocals
- Pete Moore – background vocals
- Ronnie White – background vocals

Other credits

- The Funk Brothers – instrumentation
- Holland–Dozier–Holland producer

== Chart performance ==
It was a Billboard Top 40 Pop hit, reaching number 35 on that chart, and a Top 20 hit on Casbox's R&B chart, peaking at number 17.

== Accolades ==
The song was ranked at number 356 out of the 1001 Greatest Singles Ever Made by the American rock critic Dave Marsh, who wrote: "no band ever cut a deeper groove than the Motown group does here". The British rock journalist Jon Wilde ranked it Number 6 among his top ten favourite songs in 2007, calling it "pure Motown gold and the greatest party-on record there ever was".
