= Noyo Harbor =

Harbor in Fort Bragg, California

Coordinates: 39.4240°N 123.8037°W

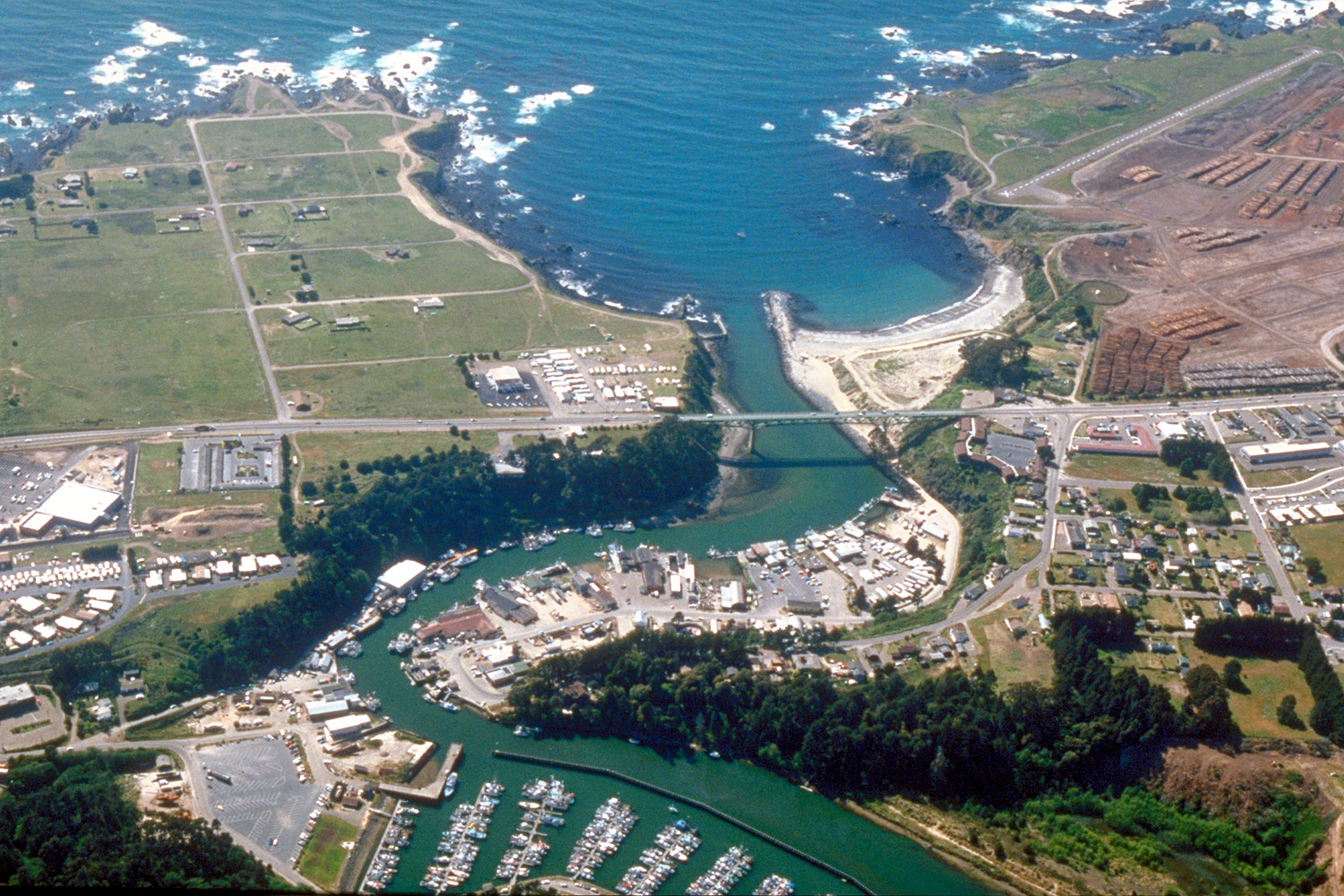
An aerial view of the mouth of the Noyo River in Fort Bragg, CA, including Noyo Harbor.

Noyo Harbor is the port and boat docking area for Fort Bragg, California, USA. It is built near the mouth of the Noyo River in the town of Noyo, just south of Fort Bragg. Noyo Harbor is located in Mendocino County 130 nautical miles (240 km) northwest of the Port of San Francisco and 145 nautical miles (269 km) south-southeast of the port of Crescent City, California. Highway 1 passes over the Noyo Bridge above the harbor.

== Movies ==
Scenes in several movies have been filmed in the harbor including:

- The Russians Are Coming, the Russians Are Coming
- Humanoids from the Deep
- Overboard
- Dying Young

== Gallery ==
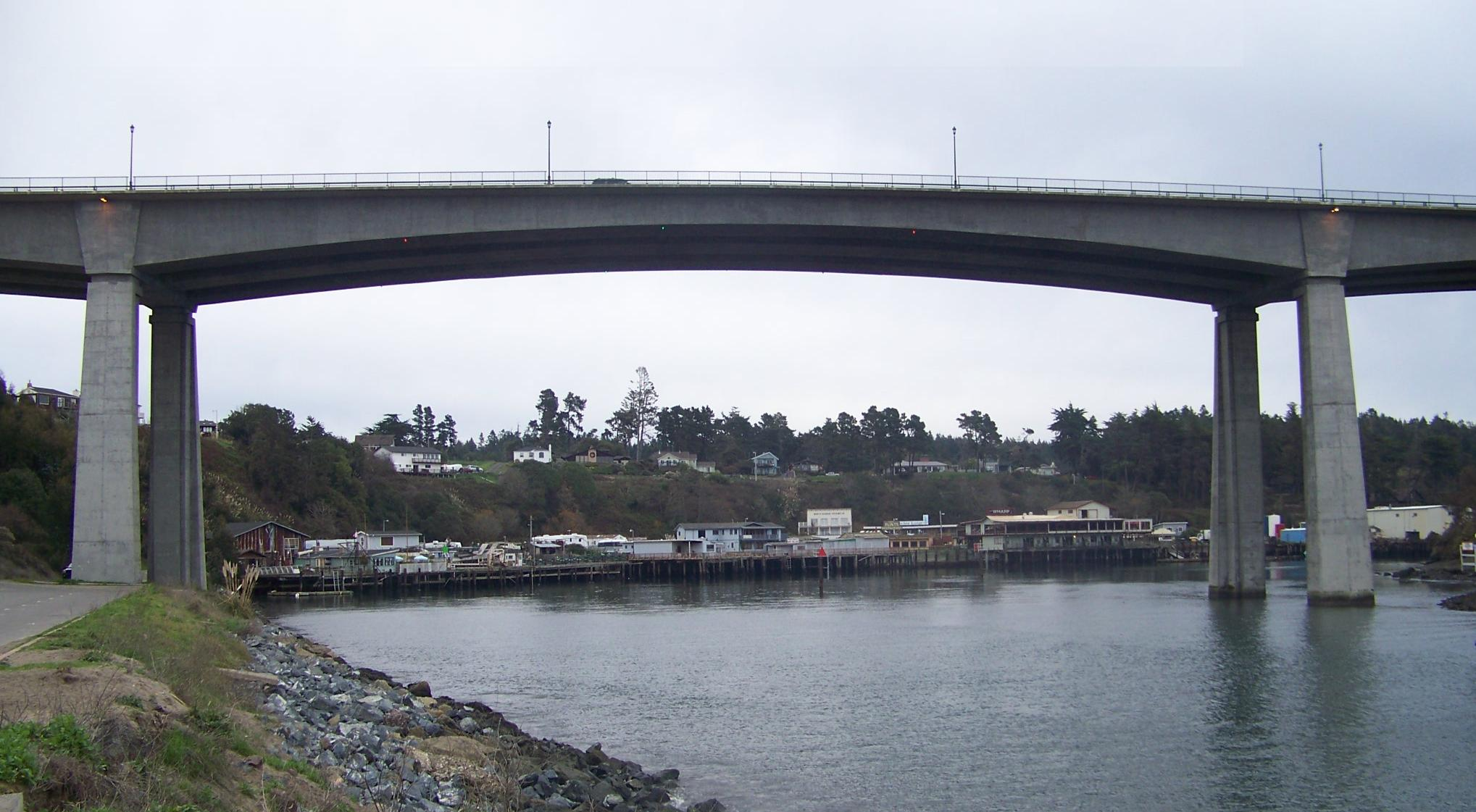
The Noyo Bridge carries Highway 1 above Noyo Harbor in Fort Bragg, California

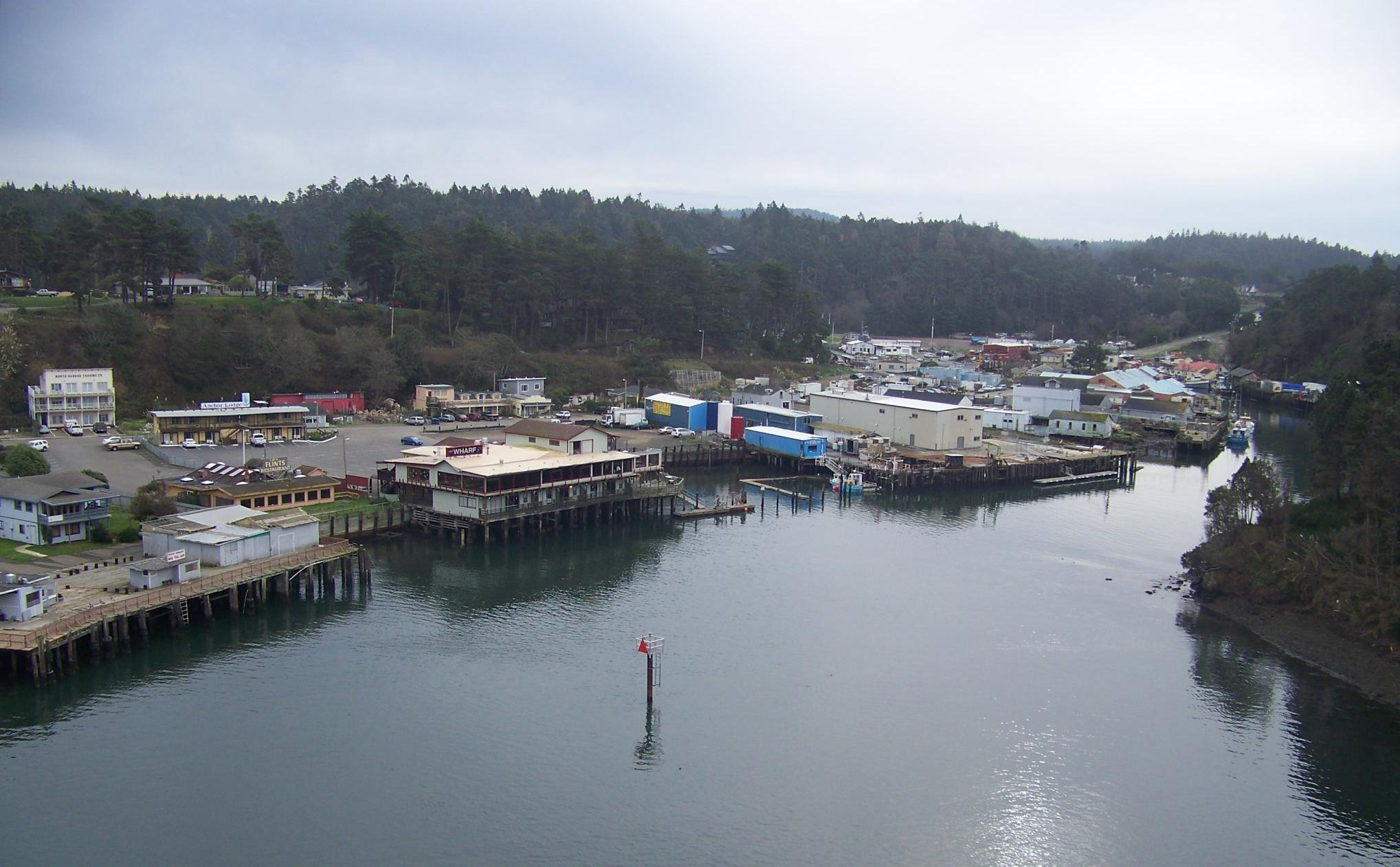
Outer Noyo Harbor which serves the commercial fishing industry in Fort Bragg, California

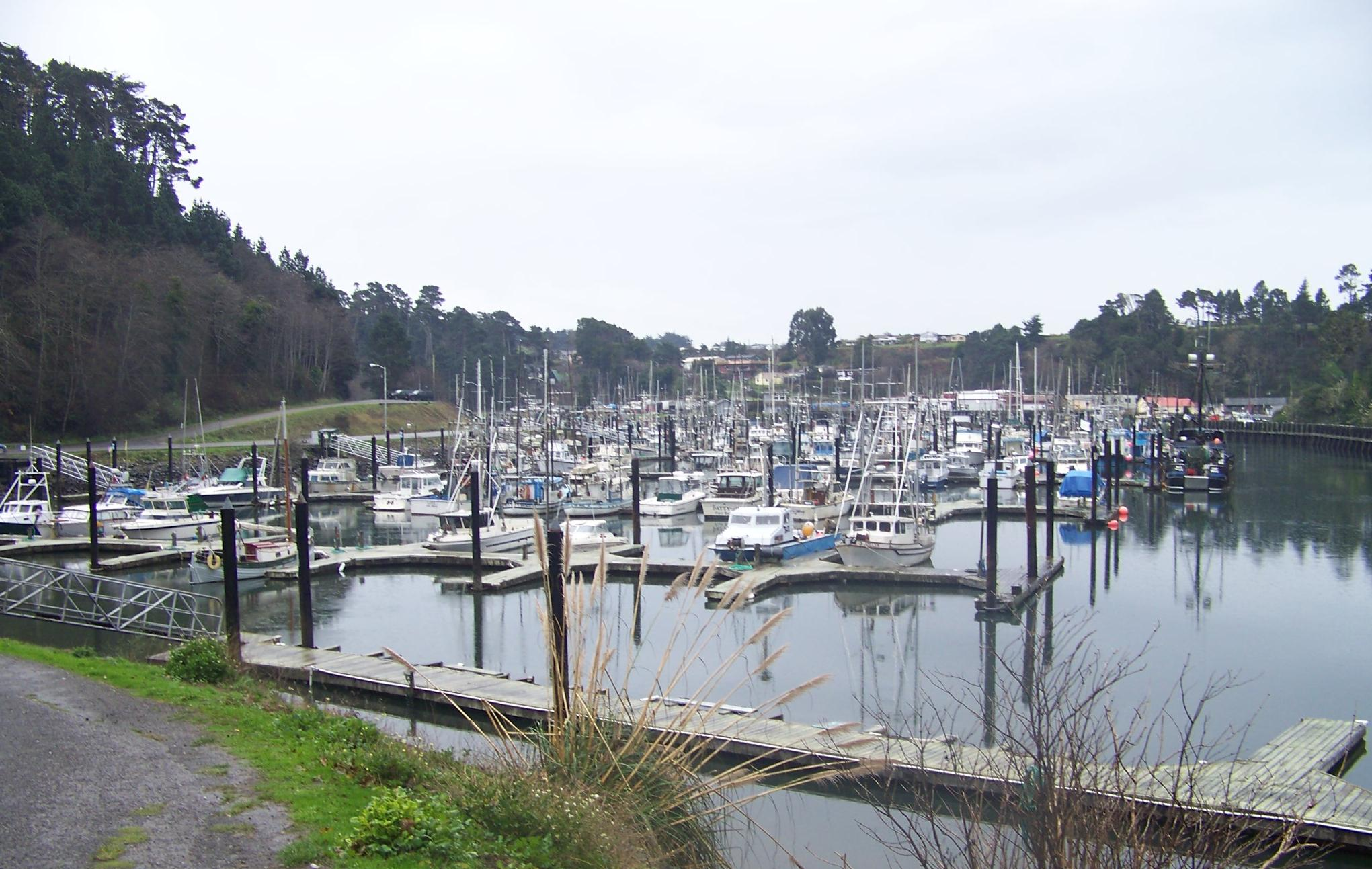
Inner Noyo Harbor which is a marina in Fort Bragg, California
