= The Applejacks (American band) =

American band led by Dave Appell

The Applejacks were a group of American studio musicians led by Dave Appell (March 24, 1922 – November 18, 2014), a native of Philadelphia, Pennsylvania. They released singles on Cameo Records. Their biggest hit was the instrumental "Mexican Hat Rock", a Top 20 hit in the U.S. in 1958.

== Singles ==
- "Mexican Hat Rock" (1958) U.S. No. 16
- "Rocka-Conga" (1959) U.S. No. 38 (Early releases of "Rocka-Conga" were pressed as "Rocka-Tonga")
- "Bunny Hop" (1959) U.S. No. 70
