= Everyday Is Christmas =

Everyday Is Christmas may refer to:

- Everyday Is Christmas (album), a 2017 album by Sia
  - "Everyday Is Christmas", title track from the album by Sia, 2017
- "Everyday Is Christmas" (song), a 2010 song by Jacky Cheung, covered by Earth Wind and Fire
- "Everyday Is Christmas", single by Dominique Rijpma van Hulst 2004, No.4 in the Netherlands
- "Everyday Is Christmas", single by Charles Bradley (singer) and The Gospel Queens 2010

== See also ==
- "Christmas Everyday", song by Smokey Robinson from Christmas with The Miracles
- Christmas Every Day, 1996 TV movie
- "Christmas Every Day!", an episode of The Fairly OddParents; see List of The Fairly OddParents episodes
- "I Wish It Could Be Christmas Everyday", 1973 song by Wizzard
