= Make It Happen (Smokey Robinson and the Miracles album) =

Studio album by Smokey Robinson & the Miracles
- Released: August 29, 1967
- Recorded: 1966–1967
- Studio: Hitsville USA, Detroit and in Los Angeles
- Genre: Soul, R&B
- Length: 33:13
- Label: Tamla
- Producer: Smokey Robinson, Henry Cosby, Brian Holland, Lamont Dozier

Smokey Robinson & the Miracles chronology
Away We a Go-Go (1966)	Make It Happen (1967)	Greatest Hits, Vol. 2 (1968)

The Tears of a Clown
- 1970 reissue

Singles from Make It Happen
- 1. "The Love I Saw in You Was Just a Mirage" Released: January 27, 1967; 2. "More Love" Released: May 26, 1967

Professional ratings
Review scores
Source	Rating
AllMusic	link

Make It Happen is a 1967 album by Smokey Robinson & the Miracles. It featured ballads such as the hit singles "The Love I Saw in You Was Just a Mirage" and "More Love", as well as the up-tempo "The Tears of a Clown" co-written by Stevie Wonder and his producer Hank Cosby.

Three years after the album's release, "The Tears of a Clown" was issued as a single, and charted at #1 on both the Billboard Hot 100 and UK Singles Chart. As a result, Make It Happen was reissued as The Tears of a Clown in 1970.

Stevie Wonder was a contributing writer on three of the album's songs, the aforementioned "The Tears of a Clown", "After You Put Back the Pieces (I'll Still Have a Broken Heart)", and "My Love Is Your Love (Forever)". Holland-Dozier-Holland contributed the good-times dance song "It's a Good Feeling". Smokey's fellow Miracles Warren "Pete" Moore and Marv Tarplin collaborated with him on the songs "You Must Be Love" (a popular regional hit tune), and "The Love I Saw in You Was Just a Mirage" (a Top 20 Hit) respectively, and all of The Miracles (except Claudette) co-wrote the up-tempo rocker "Dancing's Alright". The album also features a rendition of Little Anthony & The Imperials' 1964 Top 20 smash, "I'm on the Outside (Looking In)" "The Tears of a Clown" on the monaural version of the album has an alternate lead vocal.

Critics at Allmusic praised the album, giving it 4-1/2 out of five stars, calling it "The most underrated Miracles LP of the '60s", and stating that, in addition to the album's three hits, it also had "featured a spate of [other] great songs, including three or four that really should've been hits".

== Track listing ==
=== Side one ===
1. "The Soulful Shack" (Smokey Robinson)
2. "The Love I Saw in You Was Just a Mirage" (Robinson, Marvin Tarplin)
3. "My Love for You" (Clarence Paul, Morris Broadnax)
4. "I'm on the Outside (Looking In)" (Bobby Weinstein, Teddy Randazzo)
5. "Don't Think It's Me" (Robinson)
6. "My Love Is Your Love (Forever)" (Ivy Jo Hunter, Stevie Wonder)

=== Side two ===
1. "More Love" (Robinson)
2. "After You Put Back the Pieces (I'll Still Have a Broken Heart)" (Paul, Broadnax, Wonder)
3. "It's a Good Feeling" (Holland-Dozier-Holland)
4. "You Must Be Love" (Robinson, Warren Moore)
5. "Dancing's Alright" (Robinson, Tarplin, Moore, Robert Rogers, Ronald White)
6. "The Tears of a Clown" (Robinson, Wonder, Henry Cosby)

== Personnel ==
=== The Miracles ===
- Smokey Robinson – lead vocals, producer, album executive producer
- Ronnie White – backing vocals
- Bobby Rogers – backing vocals
- Warren "Pete" Moore – backing vocals
- Claudette Robinson – backing vocals
- Marv Tarplin – producer, guitar

=== Other instruments ===
- The Funk Brothers and various Los Angeles session musicians: instrumentation
- The Andantes – additional backing vocals on "It's a Good Feeling"

=== Producers ===
- Brian Holland – producer
- Lamont Dozier – producer
- Henry Cosby – producer
