= The Russians Are Coming the Russians Are Coming =

1966 film by Norman Jewison

- Theatrical poster by Jack Davis
- Directed by: Norman Jewison
- Screenplay by: William Rose
- Based on: The Off-Islanders; 1961 novel by Nathaniel Benchley
- Produced by: Norman Jewison
- Starring: Carl Reiner; Eva Marie Saint; Alan Arkin; Brian Keith; Jonathan Winters; Theodore Bikel; Tessie O'Shea; Ben Blue; John Philip Law; Andrea Dromm; Paul Ford
- Cinematography: Joseph F. Biroc
- Edited by: Hal Ashby; J. Terry Williams
- Music by: Johnny Mandel
- Production company: The Mirisch Corporation
- Distributed by: United Artists
- Release date: May 25, 1966 (U.S.)
- Running time: 126 minutes
- Country: United States
- Languages: English; Russian
- Budget: $3.9 million
- Box office: $21.7 million

The Russians Are Coming the Russians Are Coming is a 1966 American comedy film directed and produced by Norman Jewison for United Artists. The satirical story depicts the chaos following the grounding of the Soviet submarine СпруT ("SpruT", pronounced "sproot" and meaning "octopus") off a small New England island. The film stars Alan Arkin in his first major film role, Carl Reiner, Eva Marie Saint, Brian Keith, Theodore Bikel, Jonathan Winters, John Phillip Law, Tessie O'Shea, and Paul Ford.

The screenplay is based on the 1961 Nathaniel Benchley novel The Off-Islanders, and was adapted for the screen by William Rose. The title alludes to Paul Revere's midnight ride, as does the subplot in which the town drunk (Ben Blue) rides his horse to warn people of the "invasion".

The film premiered on May 25, 1966, and was a widespread critical and commercial success. At the 39th Academy Awards, the film was nominated for four Oscars, including Best Picture, Best Adapted Screenplay, and Best Actor for Alan Arkin. It also won two Golden Globes, for Best Motion Picture – Musical or Comedy and for Best Actor – Motion Picture Musical or Comedy for Arkin.

== Plot ==
One September morning, the Soviet Navy submarine Sprut (Note: Russian for Octopus.) draws too close to the New England coast when its captain wants to see North America and runs aground on a sandbar near Gloucester Island (Note: This is a fictional island apparently loosely based on Martha's Vineyard.) off the New England coast, with a population of about 200 people. Rather than radio for help and risk an embarrassing international incident, the captain sends a nine-man landing party, headed by his zampolit (Note: Political Officer.) Lieutenant Yuri Rozanov, to find a motor launch to help free the submarine. The men arrive at the house of Walt Whittaker, a vacationing playwright from New York City. Whittaker is eager to get his wife Elspeth and children, Pete and Annie, off the island now that summer is over.

Pete tells his disbelieving dad that armed Russians are near the house. Walt is soon met by Rozanov and one of his men, Alexei Kolchin, who identify themselves as strangers on the island and ask if there are any boats available. Walt eventually asks if they are armed Russians. Startled, Rozanov admits that they are and pulls a gun on Walt. Rozanov promises no harm to the Whittakers if they surrender their station wagon. Elspeth provides the car keys, but before the Russians depart, Rozanov orders Alexei to prevent the Whittakers from fleeing.

The station wagon quickly runs out of gasoline, forcing the Russians to walk. They steal an old sedan from Muriel Everett, the postmistress; she calls Alice Foss, the gossipy telephone switchboard operator, and soon, rumors about Russian parachutists and an air assault on the airport throw the island into confusion. Police Chief Link Mattocks and his deputy Norman Jonas try to squelch a "citizens' militia" led by Fendall Hawkins, head of the local VFW.

Meanwhile, Walt, Elspeth and Pete overpower Alexei when Alison Palmer, an 18-year-old neighbor and Annie's babysitter, arrives for work, giving them an opening. Alexei flees, but when Walt, Elspeth, and Pete leave to find help, he returns to retrieve his weapon from the house, where only Alison and Annie remain. Despite wanting no fighting, Alexei must obey his superiors in guarding the residence. He promises not to harm anyone and offers to surrender his gun as proof. Alison trusts him and does not want his firearm.

Walt is recaptured by the Russians in the telephone exchange. After subduing Mrs. Foss, tying her and Walt together and disabling the island's telephone switchboard, seven Russians appropriate civilian clothes from a dry cleaner's, steal a cabin cruiser, and head back to the submarine. Back at the Whittaker house, Alexei and Alison talk, and eventually kiss. At the telephone exchange, Walt and Mrs. Foss, bound together and gagged, escape from the office. They are eventually discovered by Elspeth and Pete, who untie them. They return to their house where Walt shoots at and almost kills Rozanov, who reached there ahead of them. With the misunderstandings cleared up, the Whittakers, Rozanov, and Alexei decide to head into town together to explain to everyone what has been going on.

As the tide rises, the sub floats off the sandbar. The Sprut proceeds on the surface to the island's main harbor to recover the landing party. Chief Mattocks, having investigated and debunked the rumor of an airborne assault, returns to town with the unorganized militia. With Rozanov acting as interpreter, the Russian captain threatens to open fire on the town unless the seven missing sailors are returned to him; his crew faces upwards of a hundred townspeople armed with everything from .22 caliber rifles and 12 gauge shotguns to military surplus battle rifles. Two small boys climb up to the church steeple to see better. One slips and falls but his belt catches on a gutter, leaving him hanging 40 feet up in the air. The American islanders and the Russian submariners join forces to rescue him by forming a human pyramid.

Peace is established between the two groups. In the meantime, however, Hawkins has contacted the Air Force by radio. In a joint decision, the submarine leaves the harbor with villagers in small craft protecting it. Alexei says goodbye to Alison. The stolen cabin cruiser with the missing Russians meets the sub, which they board before two Air Force jets arrive. The jets break off after seeing the escorting flotilla of civilian boats. The Sprut is free to proceed to deep water and safety.

== Cast ==
=== The Islanders ===
- Carl Reiner as Walt Whittaker
- Eva Marie Saint as Elspeth Whittaker
- Brian Keith as Link Mattocks
- Jonathan Winters as Norman Jonas
- Tessie O'Shea as Alice Foss
- Ben Blue as Luther Grilk
- Andrea Dromm as Alison Palmer
- Paul Ford as Fendall Hawkins
- Sheldon Collins as Pete Whittaker
- Guy Raymond as Lester Tilly
- Cliff Norton as Charles Hinkson
- Richard Schaal as Oliver Maxwell
- Philip Coolidge as Mr. Porter
- Don Keefer as Irving Christiansen
- Cindy Putnam as Annie Whittaker
- Parker Fennelly as Hal Everett
- Doro Merande as Muriel Everett
- Vaughn Taylor as Mr. Bell
- Johnny Whitaker as Jerry Maxwell
- Peter Brocco as Reverend Hawthorne (uncredited)
- Michael J. Pollard as Stanley (uncredited)

=== The Russians ===
- Alan Arkin as Lt. Yuri Rozanov
- Theodore Bikel as the Submarine Captain
- John Phillip Law as Alexei Kolchin
- Danny Klega as Polsky
- Ray Baxter as Brodsky
- Paul Verdier as Maliavin
- Nikita Knatz as Gromolsky
- Constantine Baksheef as Vasilov
- Alex Hassilev as Hrushevsky
- Milos Milos as Lysenko
- Gino Gottarelli as Kregitkin

== Production ==
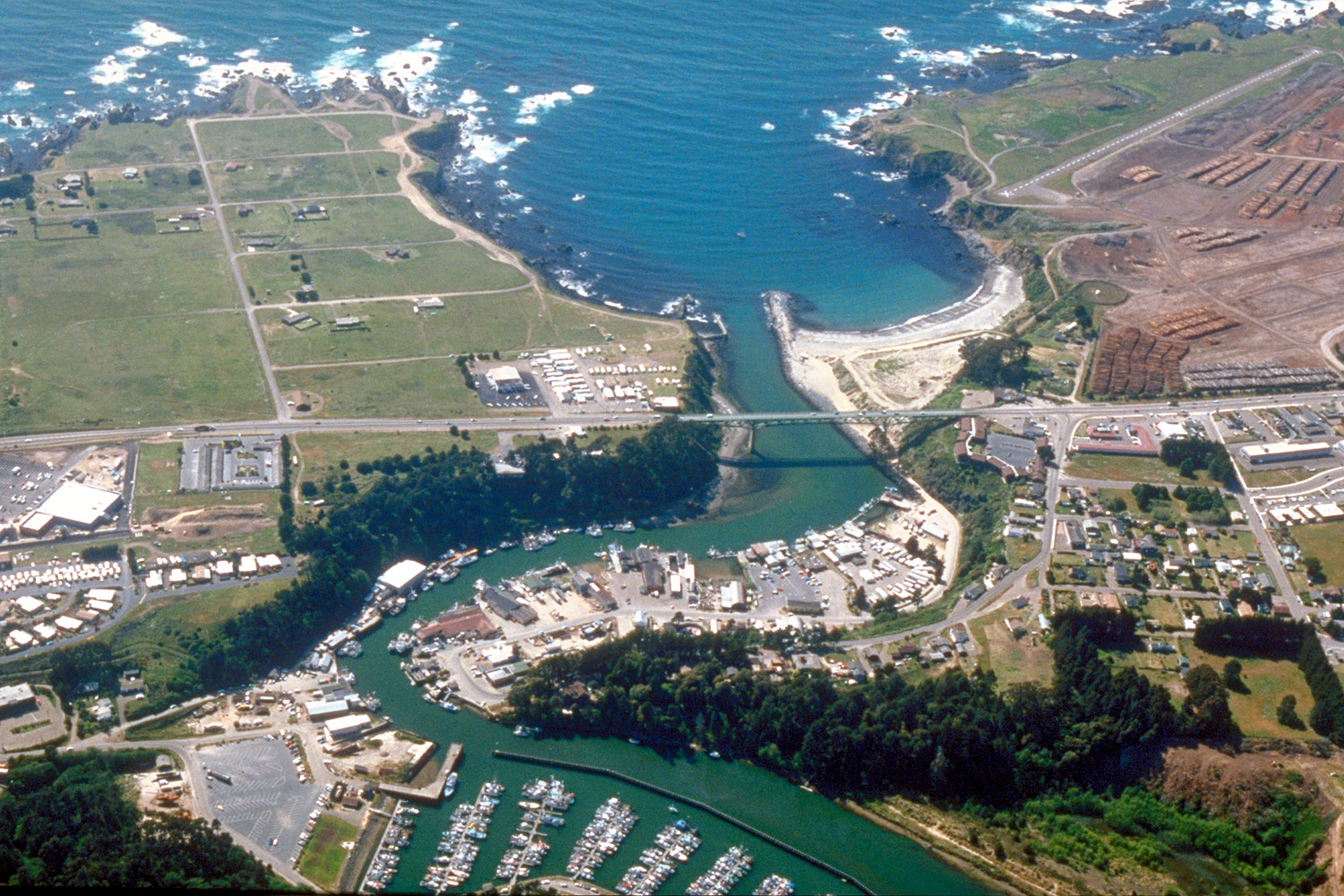
Aerial view of Noyo Harbor in California where part of the film was shot

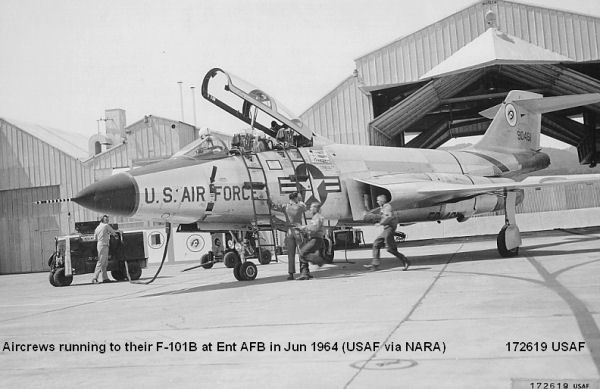
84th Fighter-Interceptor Squadron F-101B Voodoo

Although set on the fictional "Gloucester Island" off the coast of Massachusetts, the movie was filmed on the coast of Northern California, mainly in Mendocino. The harbor scenes were filmed in Noyo Harbor in Fort Bragg, California, about 7 miles (11 km) north of Mendocino. Because of the filming location on the West Coast, the dawn scene at the beginning of the film was actually filmed at dusk through a pink filter.

The submarine used was a fabrication. The United States Navy refused to lend one for the production, so the producers asked the Russian Embassy for a Soviet submarine, which was similarly refused. The Mirisch Company rented a mockup of a submarine that had been used in the 1965 film Morituri.

The planes used were actual F-101 Voodoo jets from the 84th Fighter-Interceptor Squadron, located at the nearby Hamilton Air Force Base. They were the only Air Force planes that were based near the location of the supposed island.

The title alludes to Paul Revere's midnight ride, as does the subplot in which the town drunk (Ben Blue) rides his horse to warn people of the "invasion".

Pablo Ferro created the main title sequence, using the American flag's red, white, and blue colors and the Soviet hammer and sickle as transitional elements, zooming into each to create a montage, which ultimately worked to establish the tone of the film. The music in the sequence alternates between the American "Yankee Doodle" march and a combination of the Russian songs "Polyushko Pole" (Полюшко Поле, usually "Meadowlands" in English) and the "Song of the Volga Boatmen".

Much of the dialog was spoken by the Russian characters, played by American actors at a time when few American actors were adept at Russian accents. Musician and character actor Leon Belasco — who was born in Russia, spoke fluent Russian and specialized in foreign accents during his 60-year career — was the dialog director. Alan Arkin extensively studied Russian in preparation for his role as Lt. Rozanov. As of 2017, he could still remember his Russian lines from the film. Theodore Bikel was able to pronounce Russian so well (he had taken a few classes, but was not at all fluent in the language) that he won the role of the submarine captain. Alex Hassilev, of The Limeliters, also spoke fluent Russian and played the sailor Hrushevsky. John Phillip Law's incorrect pronunciation of difficult English phonemes, most notably in Alison Palmer's name ("ah-LYEE-sown PAHL-myerr"), was unusually authentic by the standards of the day. Brian Keith, who also spoke fluent Russian, did not do so in the film.

== Musical score and soundtrack ==
The Russians Are Coming, the Russians Are Coming

Soundtrack album by Johnny Mandel
- Released: 1966
- Recorded: 1966
- Genre: Film score
- Labels: United Artists; UAL-4142

Johnny Mandel chronology
| Harper (1966) | The Russians Are Coming, the Russians Are Coming (1966) | Point Blank (1966) |

Professional ratings
Review scores
| Source | Rating |
|---|---|
| AllMusic | 3/5 stars |

The film score was composed, arranged and conducted by Johnny Mandel and the soundtrack album was released on the United Artists label in 1966. Film Score Monthly reviewed Mandel's soundtrack in their liner notes for their reissue of the score, noting the presence of Russian folk songs, writing that "These pre-existing melodies mix with original Mandel compositions, including a Russian choral anthem, a humorous march theme for the island residents' quasi-military response to the Soviet incursion, and a tender love theme...". "The Shining Sea" was sung on the soundtrack by Irene Kral, although it had featured as an instrumental in the film itself. The lyrics to "The Shining Sea" were written by Peggy Lee, who was contractually bound to Capitol Records, and so unable to appear on the soundtrack album. The line "His hands, his strong brown hands" was believed by Lee's friends to be a reference to Quincy Jones with whom she had a brief affair. Lee herself later recorded "The Shining Sea" with her lyrics on May 21, 1966. Mandel had played the music for "The Shining Sea" to Lee, and had asked her to "paint a word picture" of what she had heard. Lee's lyrics, by coincidence, exactly matched the action on the screen of the two lovers on the beach, which astonished Mandel, who had not shown her the film.

=== Track listing ===
All compositions by Johnny Mandel unless otherwise indicated

1. "The Russians Are Coming...The Russians Are Coming" - 01:37
2. "The Shining Sea" (lyrics by Peggy Lee) - 02:42
3. "Hop Along" - 02:25
4. "Volga Boat Song" (arranged by Mandel) - 01:22
5. "Escorts Away (The Russians Are Coming)" - 03:45
6. "The Shining Sea" - 03:14
7. "Sailor's Chorus" (Bonia Shur, Mandel) - 02:45
8. "Tipperary" (Harry J. Williams, Jack Judge) - 00:32
9. "The Airport" - 02:14
10. "The Russians Are Coming...The Russians Are Coming" - 02:09

== Reception ==
Robert Alden of The New York Times called it "a rousingly funny – and perceptive – motion picture about a desperately unfunny world situation." Arthur D. Murphy of Variety declared it "an outstanding cold-war comedy," adding that Jewison "has made expert use of all types of comedy technique, scripted and acted in excellent fashion by both pros and some talented newcomers to pix."

Philip K. Scheuer of the Los Angeles Times wrote, "Considering that it is made up of variations on a single theme, the picture is astonishingly inventive. And considering that it was never done as a play on the stage (where laughs can be pre-tested and rough spots ironed out) it racks up a high average indeed, though it has its lapses and some of its points are forced—over-milked, as they say in the trade." Richard L. Coe of The Washington Post called it "a refreshingly witty topical comedy ... Some exceptionally skilled comics, familiar and unfamiliar, are extremely amusing." The Monthly Film Bulletin wrote that the film "almost falls flat when it indulges in sententious philosophising about the need for Russians and Americans to live peacefully together," but is "considerably helped by an amiable script (by former Ealing writer William Rose) which often manages to invest the film with the high farce of the best of the Ealing comedies." Brendan Gill of The New Yorker called it "an unfunny big farce ... The heavy-handed producer and director of the picture, Norman Jewison, has permitted nearly every moment of it to become twice as brightly colored, twice as noisy, and twice as frantic as it needed to be; this is all the more a pity, because the cast includes a number of excellent comic actors."

According to Norman Jewison, the film — released at the height of the Cold War — had considerable impact in both Washington and Moscow. It was one of the few American films of the time to portray the Russians in a positive light. Senator Ernest Gruening mentioned the film in a speech in Congress, and a copy of it was screened in the Kremlin. According to Jewison, when screened at the Soviet film writers' union, Sergei Bondarchuk was moved to tears. In his autobiography, Jewison, noted that the Russian ambassador for the United States heard that it was a comedy that didn't make the Russians out to be heavies asked United Artists for a print to be sent, which apparently ended up being seen so many times that the print was scratched up when it was returned. Jewison was personally invited to visit Moscow to attend a showing, which he ended up doing after getting a visa. During the screening, directors Sergei Bondarchuk and Grigory Chukhray were clapping and crying at the film, with Jewison being told they were crying because "they didn't make it first".

== Awards and honors ==
| Award | Category | Nominee(s) | Result |
|---|---|---|---|
| Academy Awards | Best Picture | Norman Jewison | Nominated |
| Academy Awards | Best Actor | Alan Arkin | Nominated |
| Academy Awards | Best Screenplay – Based on Material from Another Medium | William Rose | Nominated |
| Academy Awards | Best Film Editing | Hal Ashby and J. Terry Williams | Nominated |
| British Academy Film Awards | Most Promising Newcomer to Leading Film Roles | Alan Arkin | Nominated |
| British Academy Film Awards | United Nations Award | Norman Jewison | Nominated |
| Directors Guild of America Awards | Outstanding Directorial Achievement in Motion Pictures | Norman Jewison | Nominated |
| Golden Globe Awards | Best Motion Picture – Musical or Comedy | | Won |
| Golden Globe Awards | Best Actor in a Motion Picture – Musical or Comedy | Alan Arkin | Won |
| Golden Globe Awards | Best Screenplay – Motion Picture | William Rose | Nominated |
| Golden Globe Awards | Most Promising Newcomer – Male | Alan Arkin | Nominated |
| Golden Globe Awards | Most Promising Newcomer – Male | John Phillip Law | Nominated |
| Laurel Awards | Top Comedy | | Nominated |
| Laurel Awards | Top Male Comedy Performance | Alan Arkin | Nominated |
| National Board of Review Awards | Top Ten Films | | 9th Place |
| New York Film Critics Circle Awards | Best Actor | Alan Arkin | Nominated |
| Photoplay Awards | Gold Medal | | Won |
| Writers Guild of America Awards | Best Written American Comedy | William Rose | Won |

== See also ==
- List of American films of 1966
- The Russians are coming
- Russkies
- Soviet submarine S-363
