= Away We a Go-Go =

Studio album by Smokey Robinson & the Miracles
- Released: November 16, 1966
- Studio: Hitsville USA, Detroit
- Genre: Soul
- Label: Tamla; TS-271
- Producer: Smokey Robinson; Mickey Gentile; Frank Wilson; Brian Holland; Lamont Dozier; Ivy Jo Hunter; Norman Whitfield

Smokey Robinson & the Miracles chronology
Going to a Go-Go (1965)	Away We a Go-Go (1966)	Make It Happen (1967)

Singles from Away We a Go-Go
- 1. "Whole Lot of Shakin' in My Heart (Since I Met You)" Released: May 27, 1966; 2. "(Come 'Round Here) I'm the One You Need" Released: October 19, 1966

Professional ratings
Review scores
Source	Rating
AllMusic	3/5 stars

Away We a Go-Go is a 1966 album by Smokey Robinson & the Miracles. The album features the singles "(Come 'Round Here) I'm the One You Need", a Billboard top 20 Pop hit, written and produced by Holland-Dozier-Holland; and "Whole Lot of Shakin' in My Heart (Since I Met You)", written and produced by Frank Wilson. The album uses a different take of "I'm the One You Need" than what was issued on the single. A third single was planned for release from this album, the tune "More, More, More (of Your Love)", cataloged as Tamla T-54005, but the single was never released. It was later covered by the regional group Bob Brady and The Con Chords. Another single from this album, the Stevie Wonder/Ivy Jo Hunter composition of "Can You Love a Poor Boy", was released to radio stations as a special Disc Jockey Advanced Single, Tamla T-540, but was never given an official catalog number for general release. It too, inspired cover versions by Gil Bernal and Ronnie Walker.

Also featured are covers of contemporary hits, among them the Temptations' "Beauty Is Only Skin Deep" (which the Miracles actually recorded in 1964, some two years before the Temptations did), Dusty Springfield's "You Don't Have to Say You Love Me, and two Dionne Warwick songs, "Walk On By" and "Don't Know What to Do with Myself".The original ballad, "Baby Baby", was composed by Motown staff songwriters and recording artists the Lewis Sisters who had also written songs for other Motown artists, including Marvin Gaye, Gladys Knight & the Pips, Brenda Holloway, and Martha & the Vandellas. Although not pictured on the front cover (or on any Miracles album covers since 1963's The Fabulous Miracles), original Miracles member Claudette Robinson is pictured with the group on this album's back cover. Away We a Go-Go was originally released on CD in 1992, and was re-released in 2002 in a Motown two-fer set with the Miracles' 1965 album Going to a Go-Go.

== Track listing ==
=== Side one ===
1. "Whole Lot of Shakin' in My Heart (Since I Met You)" (Frank Wilson) - 2:42
2. "You Don't Have to Say You Love Me" (Pino Donaggio, Simon Napier-Bell, Vicki Wickham, Vito Pallavicini) - 2:37
3. "(Come 'Round Here) I'm the One You Need" (Holland-Dozier-Holland) - 2:33
4. "Save Me" (Smokey Robinson, Robert Rogers, Warren Moore) - 2:25
5. "Oh Be My Love" (Robinson, Moore) - 2:49
6. "Can You Love a Poor Boy" (Ivy Jo Hunter, Stevie Wonder) - 3:16

=== Side two ===
1. "Beauty Is Only Skin Deep" (Norman Whitfield, Edward Holland, Jr.) - 2:16
2. "I Just Don't Know What to Do with Myself" (Burt Bacharach, Hal David) - 2:27
3. "Baby Baby" (Helen Lewis, Kay Lewis) - 2:58
4. "Walk On By" (Burt Bacharach, Hal David) - 2:45
5. "Swept for You Baby" (Robinson) - 3:00
6. "More, More, More of Your Love" (Robinson) - 2:42

== Personnel ==
=== The Miracles ===
- Smokey Robinson – lead vocals
- Ronnie White – background vocals
- Bobby Rogers – background vocals
- Warren "Pete" Moore – background vocals
- Claudette Robinson – background vocals
- Marv Tarplin – guitarist

=== Other performers ===
- The Funk Brothers and various New York session musicians – instrumentation
- The Andantes – background vocals (on "You Don't Have to Say You Love Me")

=== Producers ===
- Smokey Robinson – "Save Me", "Oh Be My Love", "Swept For You Baby", "More, More, More of Your Love"
- Mickey Gentile – "You Don't Have to Say You Love Me", "I Just Don't Know What to Do with Myself", "Walk On By"
- Brian Holland and Lamont Dozier – "(Come 'Round Here) I'm the One You Need"
- Frank Wilson – "Whole Lot of Shakin' in My Heart (Since I Met You)", "Baby Baby"
- Ivy Jo Hunter – "Can You Love a Poor Boy"
- Norman Whitfield – "Beauty is Only Skin Deep"
