= Choosey Beggar =

Single by the Miracles

from the album Going to a Go-Go
- A-side: "Going to a Go-Go"
- Released: December 6, 1965
- Recorded: Hitsville USA (Studio A): March 9, 1965
- Genre: Soul/pop
- Label: Tamla; T 54127
- Songwriter(s): Smokey Robinson; Pete Moore
- Producer(s): Smokey Robinson

The Miracles singles chronology
"My Girl Has Gone" (1965)	"Going to a Go-Go" / "Choosey Beggar" (1965)	"Whole Lot of Shakin' in My Heart" (1966)

"Choosey Beggar" was a 1965 song recorded by Motown R&B group the Miracles on its Tamla label subsidiary. It was issued as the B-side of the group's top-20 million-selling single, "Going to a Go-Go", and was taken from the group's Billboard Top 10 Pop album of the same name.

Written by Miracles members Smokey Robinson and Pete Moore and produced by Robinson, this song also became a national hit, reaching number 35 on the Billboard R&B chart. As the song's narrator, lead singer Smokey Robinson, using a play on the old axiom, "Beggars can't be choosers", portrays a man who simply refuses to accept just "any girl":

Beggars can't be choicey, I know...that's what the people say...But though my heart is begging for love ...I've turned some love away..." Only one girl is right for him... "I'm a choosey beggar...and you're my choice..."

Cash Box described it as a "a slow-shufflin' lament about a decidedly one-man woman."

"Choosey Beggar" has inspired cover versions by Debby Boone, and Jazz artist Chazz Dixon, and has been included in the Miracles' compilation album Greatest Hits - Vol. 2, along with several other Miracles "Greatest Hits" compilations.

== Personnel Credits ==
=== Personnel – the Miracles ===
- Smokey Robinson – lead vocals, co-writer, producer
- Claudette Rogers Robinson – background vocals
- Pete Moore – background vocals, co-writer
- Ronnie White – background vocals
- Bobby Rogers – background vocals
- Marv Tarplin – guitar

=== Other personnel ===
- Other instrumentation by The Funk Brothers and the Detroit Symphony Orchestra
