= South Street (song) =

Single by The Orlons

from the album South Street by The Orlons
- B-side: "Them Terrible Boots"
- Released: January 1963
- Genre: R&B
- Length: 2:14
- Label: Cameo
- Songwriters: Dave Appell, Kal Mann

The Orlons singles chronology
"Don't Hang Up" (1962)	"South Street" (1963)	"Not Me" (1963)

"South Street" is a song written by Dave Appell and Kal Mann and performed by The Orlons. It reached #3 on the U.S. pop chart, #4 on the U.S. R&B chart, and #4 in Canada in 1963. It was featured on their 1963 album South Street by The Orlons.

The song is about South Street in Philadelphia, which the lyrics refer to as "the hippest street in town."

Both songwriters and the R&B group were based in Philadelphia.

The single sold over one million copies and was awarded gold disc status.

The song ranked #47 on Billboard magazine's Top 100 singles of 1963.

== Other versions ==
- Al Caiola and His Orchestra released a version of the song on their 1963 album Greasy Kid Stuff.
- Sammy Lowe released a version of the song on his 1963 album Hitsville, U.S.A.
- Brian Poole & The Tremeloes released a version of the song on their 1963 album Twist and Shout.
