= Don't Hang Up (song) =

1962 single by The Orlons

Single by The Orlons

from the album All The Hits by The Orlons
- B-side: "The Conservative"
- Released: October 3, 1962
- Genre: R&B
- Length: 2:19
- Label: Cameo-Parkway
- Songwriters: Dave Appell, Kal Mann
- Producers: Dave Appell, Kal Mann

The Orlons singles chronology
"The Wah-Watusi" (1962)	"Don't Hang Up" (1962)	"South Street" (1963)

"Don't Hang Up" is a 1962 hit single produced by Cameo-Parkway Records and performed by the American R&B music group the Orlons. The tune was originally issued in the US as the flip-side to "The Conservative", however, according to RPFiller on 45cat, "A Philadelphia DJ flipped it and the B-side became the hit." Which is born out by the 45 showing the catalogue number C - 231 followed by a B. The song is also credited under the Ariola Records label. The song was a number four hit on the Billboard Pop chart and reached number three on its R&B chart. One of the group's biggest songs during their career, "Don't Hang Up" remains an icon of the early 1960s era of popular music and was awarded gold disc status for selling over one million copies.

== Chart performance ==
Chart	Peak position
US Billboard Hot 100	4
US R&B Singles	3
CAN CHUM Chart	23
UK Singles Chart	39

== Credits ==
- Written by Dave Appell & Kal Mann
- Executive producer: Bernie Lowe
- Lead vocals: Rossetta Hightower
- Backing vocals: Marlena Davis & Shirley Brickley
- Support vocals: Steve Caldwell

== Popular culture ==
- The song achieved notoriety again in the 1990s, when it was included in the 1993 family comedy film Dennis the Menace.
