= The Wah-Watusi =

Single by the Orlons

from the album The Wah-Watusi
- B-side: "Holiday Hill"
- Released: May 1962
- Genre: R&B
- Length: 2:30
- Label: Cameo
- Songwriters: Kal Mann, Dave Appell

The Orlons singles chronology
"(Happy Birthday) Mr. Twenty-One" (1962)	"The Wah-Watusi" (1962)	"Don't Hang Up" (1962)

"The Wah-Watusi" is a song written by Kal Mann and Dave Appell and recorded by the Orlons in 1962. It is named for the Watusi, a popular dance style among American teenagers during the early 1960s. The song reached No. 2 on the U.S. pop chart (just behind Bobby Vinton's "Roses Are Red"), No. 5 on the U.S. R&B chart, and No. 12 in Canada. That same year, it was featured on the Orlons' album The Wah-Watusi.

"The Wah-Watusi" sold over one million copies and was awarded gold disc status.

The song ranked No. 24 on Billboard magazine's Top 100 singles of 1962.

== Other versions ==
- Dee Dee Sharp, on her 1962 compilation album All the Hits by Dee Dee Sharp.
- Annette, as a single in 1964, but it did not chart.
- The Miracles, on their 1963 album The Miracles Doin' Mickey's Monkey.
- The Ronettes included their version on the 2011 various artists album The Philles Album Collection. Their rendition had originally been released on The Crystals' 1963 album The Crystals Sing the Greatest Hits Volume 1, but The Crystals received credit for the song.

== In popular culture ==
- The Orlons' version was featured in the 2011 film The Help and was included on the soundtrack.
- The Wachusett Mountain Ski Area in Massachusetts has adapted the song as a commercial jingle for a number of years.
- In an episode of Mama's Family, Naomi and her friend Luann are singing and dancing to it.
- A variation of The Wha-Watusi dance called, "Wagon Wheel Watusi," is featured in the film Burlesque.
