= Going to a Go-Go (song) =

1965 single by The Miracles

Single by the Miracles

from the album Going to a Go-Go
- B-side: "Choosey Beggar"
- Released: December 6, 1965
- Recorded: August 17, 1965
- Studio: Hitsville USA, Detroit
- Genre: Soul/pop
- Length: 2:50
- Label: Tamla; T 54127
- Songwriters: Smokey Robinson; Pete Moore; Bobby Rogers; Marv Tarplin
- Producers: Smokey Robinson; Pete Moore

The Miracles singles chronology
"My Girl Has Gone" (1965)	"Going to a Go-Go" (1965)	"Whole Lot of Shakin' in My Heart" (1966)

"Going to a Go-Go" is a 1965 single recorded by the Miracles for Motown's Tamla label.

== The Miracles' original version ==
Smokey Robinson sings lead on "Going to a Go-Go", which he co-wrote with fellow Miracles Pete Moore, Bobby Rogers, and Marv Tarplin. Moore, Rogers, Ronnie White, and Smokey Robinson's wife Claudette Robinson provide backing vocals for the song, an up-tempo dance song inviting people from all walk of life to attend a go-go party. Miracles Robinson and Pete Moore were the song's producers. In the Motown DVD release Smokey Robinson And The Miracles: The Definitive Performances, Miracles member and co-writer Bobby Rogers commented that this song was inspired by the success of the "go-go" clubs that grew in popularity throughout the United States in the 1960s. While at first a regional phenomenon, the success of this Miracles song ignited a nationwide fad for go-go music in America.

Issued in December 1965, "Going to a Go-Go" peaked at number 11 on the Billboard Hot 100 in the United States the following spring. In addition, the single peaked at number two on the Billboard Hot R&B Singles chart and was The Miracles' fifth million-selling record.

Cash Box described it as a "hard-driving, bluesy handclapper with an infectious repeating rhythmic riff" and felt the song was "ultra-commercial".

"Going to a Go-Go" is featured on the Miracles' album of the same name, which proved to be their highest-charting LP of all-original material. The album reached the Top Ten of the Billboard Top 200 Albums chart in early 1966, peaking at number eight, and reached #1 on the Billboard top R&B albums chart. In 2003, the Miracles' Going To A Go-Go album was ranked number 271 on Rolling Stone magazine's list of the 500 greatest albums of all time.

One of the tracks from the Going to a Go-Go LP, "Choosey Beggar", was issued as the single's b-side, and was also a hit, peaking at number 35 on the Billboard R&B chart.

=== Personnel ===
The Miracles

- Smokey Robinson – lead vocals, producer
- Marv Tarplin – 12-string lead guitar
- Bobby Rogers – background vocals, co-writer
- Ronnie White – background vocals
- Pete Moore – background vocals, co-writer, vocal arranger
- Claudette Rogers Robinson – background vocals

Other instrumentation by The Funk Brothers

- Eddie Willis – rhythm guitar
- Earl Van Dyke – piano
- James Jamerson – bass
- Benny Benjamin – drums
- Eddie "Bongo" Brown – percussion
- Jack Ashford – tambourine

== The Rolling Stones live version ==
"Going to a Go-Go"

Single by the Rolling Stones

from the album Still Life
- B-side: "Beast of Burden" (Live)
- Released: 1 June 1982
- Recorded: December 1981
- Genre: Rock
- Length: 3:10
- Label: Rolling Stones
- Songwriters: Smokey Robinson; Pete Moore; Bobby Rogers; Marvin Tarplin
- Producer: The Glimmer Twins

The Rolling Stones singles chronology
"Hang Fire" (1982)	"Going to a Go-Go" (1982)	"Time Is on My Side" (1982)

"Going to a Go-Go" was covered by the Rolling Stones on their 1982 live album Still Life. Released as the album's first single, the Stones' version "Going to a Go-Go" reached number 26 on the British charts and number 25 in the United States. The song was played, possibly the first live version, on November 3, 1981 in Louisville,KY during their North American Tour that supported the Tattoo You album. Both the single and the album were released in the middle of the band's 1982 European tour. Other versions of the song are included on the band's Live at Leeds and Hampton Coliseum live albums. Despite its relative success, the Rolling Stones never recorded this song in a studio.

=== Personnel ===
- Mick Jagger – lead vocals
- Keith Richards – guitar, background vocals
- Ronnie Wood – guitar
- Bill Wyman – bass
- Charlie Watts – drums

Other instrumentation

- Ian Stewart – piano
- Ian McLagan – keyboards, background vocals
- Ernie Watts – saxophone
- The Glimmer Twins – producers

=== Charts ===
==== Weekly charts ====
Chart (1982)	Peak position
Austria (Ö3 Austria Top 40)	16
Belgium (Ultratop 50 Flanders)	8
Canada (CHUM Chart)	1
Canada Top Singles (RPM)	4
Finland (Soumen Virallinen)	16
Ireland (IRMA)	18
Netherlands (Dutch Top 40)	4
Netherlands (Single Top 100)	3
New Zealand (Recorded Music NZ)	24
Norway (VG-lista)	5
Sweden (Sverigetopplistan)	18
Switzerland (Schweizer Hitparade)	9
UK Singles (Official Charts)	26
US Billboard Hot 100	25
US Mainstream Rock	5

==== Year-end charts ====
Chart (1982)	Position
Netherlands (Dutch Top 40)	54
Netherlands (Single Top 100)	70

== Other covers ==
The song was also a top UK Top 50 hit in 1975 by the Sharonettes.

Phil Collins recorded a cover during the sessions for his 2010 album Going Back. Paul Weller released a cover of the song as a single on Third Man Records in 2021; it reached No. 59 in the Official Singles Sales Chart, No. 6 in the Official Physical Singles Chart, and No. 3 in the Official Vinyl Singles Chart.

The Miracles' "Going To A Go-Go" was referenced by Arthur Conley in his 1967 hit tune, "Sweet Soul Music".

== Other sources ==
- Demitri Coryton; Joseph Murrells (1990). Hits Of The Sixties: The Million Sellers. Batsford Ltd. p. 131. ISBN 978-0713458510.
- Motown/Universal DVD: Smokey Robinson & The Miracles: The Definitive Performances (1963-1987)
