= Come Spy with Me (film) =

1967 American spy film by Marshall Stone

- Lobby card
- Directed by: Marshall Stone
- Screenplay by: Cherney Berg; Erven Jourdan
- Story by: Stuart James
- Produced by: Arnold Kaiser
- Starring: Troy Donahue; Andrea Dromm; Albert Dekker; Mart Hulswit; Valerie Allen
- Cinematography: Zoli Vidor
- Edited by: Hy Goldman
- Music by: Bob Bowers
- Production companies: ABC Circle Films; Futuramic; MPO
- Distributed by: 20th Century Fox
- Release date: January 18, 1967 (U.S.)
- Running time: 85 minutes
- Country: United States
- Language: English

Come Spy with Me is a 1967 American spy film produced by Arnold Kaiser, directed by Marshall Stone, and released by 20th Century Fox.

The film's stars are Troy Donahue and Andrea Dromm. Smokey Robinson & the Miracles performed the film's titular theme song, written by lead singer Robinson.

== Plot ==
The film features Dromm ("I'm an AGENT, not a spy!"), solving a murder case, rescuing a kidnap victim, breaking up a mastermind's (Albert Dekker) underwater bomb assassination plot of several world leaders, and dancing the new dance called "the Shark" on the Caribbean island of Jamaica.

== Cast ==
- Troy Donahue as Pete Barker
- Andrea Dromm as Jill Parsons
- Albert Dekker as Walter Ludeker
- Mart Hulswit as Larry Claymore
- Valerie Allen as Samantha
- Dan Ferrone as Augie
- Howard Schell as Corbett
- Chance Gentry as Chance
- Louis Edmonds as Gunther Stiller
- Kate Aldrich as Chris
- Pam Colbert as Pam
- Gil Pratley as Kieswetter
- Georges Shoucair as Pantin
- Alston Bair as Keefer
- Tim Moxon as Morgan
- Eric Coverley as Karl
- Jack Lewis as Brooks
- Luciene Bridou as Linda

== Production ==
The film was the first produced under a 13-film co-production treaty between Allied Artists and five television stations owned by ABC.

It was the first movie made by Troy Donahue following the end of his contract with Warner Bros. It was originally called Red on Red.

Hot off her success for her performance in The Russians Are Coming, the Russians Are Coming Andrea Dromm was recruited by the American Broadcasting Company to host a television special about the surfing craze called Hit the Surf and to play a female secret agent in the lead role of ABC Films first production. She knew the director Marshall Stone from their work together in National Airlines and Clairol "Summer Girl" television commercials. Dromm had to learn motorcycle riding and scuba diving for the film, but her underwater shots were doubled. Dromm was nervous about scuba diving and what she felt were unsafe conditions; she said that Troy Donahue got into some trouble underwater due to problems with his diving regulator. Dromm never made another film.

The film was overshadowed by 20th Century Fox's other 1967 female spy films; Fathom with Raquel Welch and Caprice with Doris Day.

== Critical reaction ==
The film was released to mostly negative reviews and was not a success. The New York Herald Tribune film review stated "The film belongs on top of sky high pile of other 'I Spy' losers" ending the review with "come die with me". The review in Variety paraphrased Dromm's National Airline commercial catchphrase "Is this any way to run an airline? You bet it is!" to "Is this any way to make a motion picture? You bet it isn't!"

== Home media ==
Come Spy with Me has not been reissued by 20th Century Fox or released on home video.
