= (You Can't Let the Boy Overpower) The Man in You =

Single by the Miracles
- B-side: "Heartbreak Road"
- Released: January 13, 1964
- Recorded: August 17, 1963
- Studio: Hitsville U.S.A. (Studio A), Detroit, Michigan
- Genre: Soul
- Length: 2:45
- Label: Tamla
- Songwriter(s): Smokey Robinson
- Producer(s): Smokey Robinson, Berry Gordy

The Miracles singles chronology
"The Christmas Song" (1963)	"(You Can't Let the Boy Overpower) The Man in You" (1964)	"I Like It Like That" (1964)

"(You Can't Let the Boy Overpower) The Man in You" is a 1964 R&B song by the Miracles on Motown Records' Tamla subsidiary label. It was written by Miracles lead singer Bill "Smokey" Robinson, and was produced by Robinson and Motown president/founder Berry Gordy Jr. One of several gospel-styled call and response tunes the group issued in 1964, this song reached number 59 on the Billboard Pop chart, and the top 20 of the Cash Box R&B chart, peaking at number 12. (Billboard had temporarily suspended its R&B chart during this time.) The song was recorded on August 17, 1963, and was the group's first single release of 1964.

After the million-selling success of their hit "Shop Around", Smokey and the other Miracles (Bobby Rogers, wife Claudette Robinson, Pete Moore, Ronnie White, and Marv Tarplin) recorded several tunes between 1961 and 1964, with the main theme centering on "parental advice". In this song, it is the father who is giving pearls of wisdom, advising Smokey, as the song's narrator, about the importance of "being a man", being loyal, and treating your wife or girlfriend right, despite the fact that every man has "a boy in his heart" that would lead him to do otherwise."(You Can't Let the Boy Overpower) The Man in You'.

Cash Box described it as "an infectious shuffle-rock affair that could take off in no time flat."

This song was not one of the group's more successful singles, and did not appear on any original Miracles studio album, not even making the group's first greatest hits album, The Miracles' Greatest Hits from the Beginning, but, since then, has appeared on several Miracles "Greatest Hits" CD compilations, including the group's 4-CD 35th Anniversary Collection, and has spawned a cover version by Chuck Jackson. The song's "B" side was the popular "Heartbreak Road".

== Personnel ==
The Miracles

- Smokey Robinson – lead vocals
- Claudette Robinson, Pete Moore, Ronnie White, Bobby Rogers – backing vocals
- Marv Tarplin – guitar

Other Credits

- The Funk Brothers – other instrumentation
