= Going to a Go-Go =

Studio album by Smokey Robinson & the Miracles
- Released: November 1, 1965
- Recorded: 1963–1965
- Studio: Hitsville USA, Detroit
- Genre: Soul
- Length: 33:49
- Label: Tamla
- Producer: Smokey Robinson

Smokey Robinson & the Miracles chronology
Greatest Hits from the Beginning (1965)	Going to a Go-Go (1965)	Away We a Go-Go (1966)

Singles from Going to a Go-Go
- 1. "Ooo Baby Baby" Released: March 5, 1965; 2. "The Tracks of My Tears" Released: June 23, 1965; 3. "My Girl Has Gone" Released: September 22, 1965; 4. "Going to a Go-Go" Released: December 6, 1965

Professional ratings
Review scores
Source	Rating
Allmusic	4.5/5 stars
Record Mirror	4/5 stars

Going to a Go-Go is the seventh studio album by the American R&B group Smokey Robinson and the Miracles. (Note: The album was the first credited to Smokey Robinson and the Miracles rather than simply the Miracles.) It was released on November 1, 1965, in the United States on Motown's Tamla label. It includes four of the Miracles' Top 20 hits: "Ooo Baby Baby", "The Tracks of My Tears", "Going to a Go-Go", and "My Girl Has Gone".

Going to a Go-Go was the only Miracles studio LP to chart within the Top 10 of the Billboard Top LPs chart, where it remained for 40 weeks, peaking at number 8. The LP peaked at number-one on Billboard's R&B albums chart. In 2003, the album achieved Gold Record status. It was ranked number 271 on Rolling Stone magazine's list of the 500 greatest albums of all time, and number 273 in the 2012 revised list, and number 412 in the 2020 revised list.

Going to a Go-Go was reissued on CD in 2002, coupled with the Miracles' Away We a Go-Go.

== Composition ==
Sessions for the album took place at Hitsville USA in Detroit between February 10 and September 29, 1965, but six of the twelve tracks had been recorded years earlier, in 1963 and 1964. Robinson wrote or co-wrote all the tracks, apart from "My Baby Changes Like the Weather", which was written by two other Motown writers, Hal Davis and Frank Wilson. Robinson's main writing partner was his childhood friend and co-founder of the Miracles, Warren "Pete" Moore, who worked with him on seven of the album's twelve tracks. The other writers are: Miracles members Bobby Rogers, Ronald White, and Marv Tarplin, along with William "Mickey" Stevenson, a Motown songwriter and producer, who contributed to one song. Marv Tarplin, the Miracles' lead guitarist, created the evocative opening chords of "The Tracks of My Tears". and the starting guitar riffs on the title song, and "My Girl Has Gone" .

== Release ==
Going to a Go-Go was released November 1, 1965, and reached number-eight on the Billboard Top LPs chart, and number-one on Billboard's R&B albums chart. It is the only Miracles studio LP to chart within the Top 10. (Another Miracles LP, Greatest Hits Vol. 2 was also a Top 10 success, but that was a compilation, not a studio album.)

The tracks "Ooo Baby Baby", "The Tracks of My Tears", "Going to a Go-Go", and "My Girl Has Gone", were released as singles, and reached the Top 20. "Choosey Beggar" charted on the Billboard Hot R&B Singles chart at number 35. "A Fork in the Road" was a strong regional hit in several areas of the country and was regularly performed as part of the Miracles' live show.

Going to a Go-Go was reissued on CD in 2002, coupled with the Miracles' Away We a Go-Go.

== Track listing ==
Side one
No.	Title	Writer(s)	Length
1.	"The Tracks of My Tears"	Warren Moore, Smokey Robinson, Marvin Tarplin	2:55
2.	"Going to a Go-Go"	Moore, Robinson, Robert Rogers, Tarplin	2:46
3.	"Ooo Baby Baby"	Moore, Robinson	2:45
4.	"My Girl Has Gone"	Moore, Robinson, Tarplin, Ronald White	2:50
5.	"In Case You Need Love"	Robinson	2:47
6.	"Choosey Beggar"	Moore, Robinson	2:33
Total length:			16:36

Side two
No.	Title	Writer(s)	Length
1.	"Since You Won My Heart"	Robinson, William "Mickey" Stevenson	2:16
2.	"From Head to Toe"	Robinson	2:25
3.	"All That's Good"	Moore, Robinson	3:12
4.	"My Baby Changes Like the Weather"	Hal Davis, Frank Wilson	2:47
5.	"Let Me Have Some"	Robinson, Rogers	3:07
6.	"A Fork in the Road"	Moore, Robinson, White	3:26
Total length:			17:13

== Personnel ==
According to the 2022 reissue's liner notes:

The Miracles

- Smokey Robinson – lead vocals, producer
- Ronnie White – background vocals
- Bobby Rogers – background vocals
- Warren "Pete" Moore – background vocals
- Claudette Robinson – background vocals
- Marv Tarplin – guitar

Additional musicians and production

- The Funk Brothers and the Detroit Symphony Orchestra – instrumentation
- Pete Moore – vocal arrangements

== See also ==
- List of number-one R&B albums of 1966 (U.S.)
