= The Orlons =

American R&B group from Philadelphia, Pennsylvania

- Origin: Philadelphia, Pennsylvania, U.S.
- Genres: R&B, rock
- Years active: 1960–present
- Labels: Cameo-Parkway, Ariola, Wyncote, Various
- Members: Jean Brickley; Alberta Crump; Madeline Morris
- Past members: Rosetta Hightower; Shirley Brickley; Marlena Davis; Sandy Person; Yvonne Young; Audrey Brickley; Stephen Caldwell

The Orlons are an American R&B group from Philadelphia, Pennsylvania, that formed in 1960. The group won gold discs for three of their singles.

== Career ==
The quartet consisted of lead singer Rosetta Hightower (June 23, 1944 – August 2, 2014), Shirley Brickley (December 9, 1944 – October 13, 1977), Marlena Davis (October 4, 1944 – February 27, 1993), and Stephen Caldwell (November 22, 1942 – October 2, 2025).

Before they became the Orlons, they were an all-girl quintet called Audrey and the Teenettes. They formed in the late 1950s in junior high school and consisted of Hightower, Davis, and three Brickley sisters: Shirley, Jean, and Audrey. However, after the Brickleys' mother did not permit 13-year-old Audrey to sing in certain nightclubs with the group, she and Jean quit, making the group a trio.

In high school, the group's three remaining members discovered fellow student Stephen Caldwell, who was lead singer of a local group called the Romeos. Impressed, they invited him to join the group in 1960 and named themselves the Orlons as a tongue-in-cheek nod to the friendly rivalry they had with a popular group at their high school, the Cashmeres. (Orlon was a brand name for the widely used synthetic fiber acrylic.)

A high school friend, Dovells lead singer Len Barry, encouraged them to audition for Cameo-Parkway Records at the turn of the decade. The group took his advice in the fall of 1961, but were rejected at first, although the record label signed the group after two more auditions. Cameo executive Dave Appell appointed Hightower as the lead singer, and began writing songs for them.

In 1962, the group provided back-up vocals for Dee Dee Sharp's hits "Mashed Potato Time" and "Gravy (For My Mashed Potatoes)". They later found fame with their first national hit, "The Wah-Watusi", which reached No. 2 in the US pop chart and which triggered the brief Watusi dance craze. They recorded their own versions of the Dee Dee Sharp songs for their debut album, The Wah-Watusi, which received a rating of 4.5 out of 5 from AllMusic in 2006. They had a second hit in the same year with "Don't Hang Up", a No. 4 hit on the pop chart. The group had three hits in 1963: "South Street", the group's last Top Ten hit, which reached No. 3 on the Billboard chart; "Not Me", which reached No. 12; and "Crossfire", the group's last hit, which reached No. 19.

They also recorded a version of the Bobby Rydell hit "The Cha-Cha-Cha", which includes the line "When you see the Wah-Watusi, you go a-ha-ha-ha," poking fun at their own hit.

Davis left the group in August 1963 and Caldwell quit the group in 1964, Sandy Person replaced Davis. A short-lived stint by Yvonne Young was followed by original Teenette, Audrey Brickley, Shirley's sister. By then, the group's popularity had waned in the United States. They continued to perform into the late 1960s with success in the UK. They disbanded in 1968 after Hightower decided to stay in England after a tour. Hightower had a successful career as a soloist and as an in-demand session singer, backing Joe Cocker, John Holt and other artists. She married record producer Ian Green.

In later years, Davis married and found work as an executive secretary, whilst Caldwell became a shop steward of the bus drivers' trade union, and then became the administrator of the union's legal fund in Philadelphia and served on the Philadelphia Board of Education for 29 years. In 1988, Caldwell and Davis re-formed the group with two new members and performed live on the oldies circuit until Davis' death in 1993.

On October 13, 1977, Shirley Brickley (aged 32) was shot dead by an intruder in her home in Philadelphia. Marlena Davis died of lung cancer on February 27, 1993 (aged 48). Audrey Brickley died of acute respiratory distress syndrome on July 3, 2005 (aged 58). Rosetta Hightower Green died in Clapham, London, on August 2, 2014, at the age of 70. Stephen Caldwell died on October 2, 2025 (aged 82) making him the last of the original members to pass away. Caldwell and Jean Brickley still had been performing as the Orlons with two of Caldwell's cousins, Alberta Crump and Madeline Morris.

In March 2012, Caldwell and Brickley took part in the benefit single "Mull of Kintyre", featuring Charlie Gracie with Clutch Cargo.

== Awards ==
"The Wah-Watusi," "Don't Hang Up," and "South Street" each sold over one million copies and were awarded gold disc status.

== Discography ==
=== Albums ===
(Chart positions and featured charted hits in parentheses)

- 1962: The Wah-Watusi—Cameo C-1020 (U.S. Billboard No. 80)
- 1963: All the Hits by The Orlons—Cameo C-1033
- 1963: South Street—Cameo C-1041 (U.S. Billboard No. 123)
- 1963: Not Me—Cameo C-1054
- 1963: Down Memory Lane—Cameo C-1073

=== Compilation albums ===
- 1963: Biggest Hits—Cameo C-1061
- 1963: Golden Hits—Cameo C-1067 (Duet compilation with the Dovells)
- 2005: The Best of The Orlons (Abkco compilation under series title: "Cameo Parkway 1961–1966")

=== Singles ===
Year of release	Titles (A-side, B-side) Both sides from same album except where indicated	Label & Number	Chart Positions				Album
Year of release	Titles (A-side, B-side) Both sides from same album except where indicated	Label & Number	US	US R&B	CAN (CHUM RPM)	UK Singles Chart	Album
1961	"I'll Be True" b/w "Heart, Darling, Angel" (Non-LP track)	Cameo 198					The Wah-Watusi
1962	"(Happy Birthday) Mr. Twenty-One" b/w "Please Let It Be Me" (Non-LP track)	Cameo 211					The Wah-Watusi
1962	"The Wah-Watusi" b/w "Holiday Hill" (Non-LP track)	Cameo 218	2	5	12		The Wah-Watusi
1962	"Don't Hang Up" b/w "The Conservative" (Non-LP track)	Cameo 231	4	3	23	39	All The Hits by The Orlons
1963	"South Street" b/w "Them Terrible Boots" (from Biggest Hits)	Cameo 243	3	4	4		South Street
1963	"Where You Goin', Little Boy?" b/w "Gig"; As "Zip and The Zippers"	Pageant 607					Non-LP tracks
1963	"Not Me" b/w "My Best Friend"	Cameo 257	12	8	20		Not Me
1963	"Crossfire!" b/w "It's No Big Thing" (Non-LP track)	Cameo 273	19	25	36		It's Dance Time*
1963	"Bon-Doo-Wah" b/w "Don't Throw Your Love Away" (from All The Hits with the Stars*)	Cameo 287	55	17			Shindig with the Stars*
1964	"Shimmy Shimmy" b/w "Everything Nice"	Cameo 295	66	17			Non-LP tracks
1964	"Rules of Love" b/w "Heartbreak Hotel" (Non-LP track)	Cameo 319	66	33			Hullabaloo with the Stars*
1964	"Knock! Knock! (Who's There?)" b/w "Goin' Places"	Cameo 332	64	23	38		Non-LP tracks
1964	"I Ain't Comin' Back" b/w "Envy (In My Eyes)"	Cameo 346	129				Non-LP tracks
1965	"Come on Down Baby Baby" b/w "I Ain't Comin' Back"	Cameo 352					Non-LP tracks
1965	"Don't You Want My Lovin'" b/w "I Can't Take It"	Cameo 372					Non-LP tracks
1965	"No One But Your Love" b/w "Envy (In My Eyes)"	Cameo 384					Non-LP tracks
1966	"Spinnin' Top" b/w "Anyone Who Had A Heart"	Calla 113					Non-LP tracks
1967	"Keep Your Hands Off My Baby" b/w "Everything"	ABC 10894					Non-LP tracks
1967	"Kissin' Time" b/w "Once Upon A Time"	ABC 10948					Non-LP tracks

- *Compilations of various Cameo/Parkway artists

== Bibliography ==
- Clemente, John ed. (2013). Girl Groups — Fabulous Females Who Rocked The World (Second ed.). Authorhouse Publishing. pp. 384–387. ISBN 978-1-4772-7633-4
