= More Love (Smokey Robinson and the Miracles song) =

1967 single by The Miracles

Single by Smokey Robinson and the Miracles

from the album Make It Happen
- B-side: "Swept for You Baby"
- Released: May 26, 1967
- Recorded: Los Angeles, California (instrumentation); Hitsville USA (Studio A) (vocals); April 26, 1967
- Genre: Soul
- Length: 2:49
- Label: Tamla; T 54152
- Songwriter: Smokey Robinson
- Producer: Smokey Robinson

Smokey Robinson and the Miracles singles chronology
"The Love I Saw In You Was Just a Mirage" (1967)	"More Love" (1967)	"I Second That Emotion" (1967)

"More Love" is a 1967 hit single recorded by the American soul group The Miracles for Motown Records' Tamla label. The single, included on the group's 1967 album Make It Happen, later reissued in 1970 as The Tears of a Clown. Kim Carnes's 1980 cover of the song reached the Top 10 of Billboard's Adult Contemporary and Hot 100 charts.

== The Miracles' original version ==
This song's origins are born from real-life heartbreak and personal tragedy. Miracles lead singer Smokey Robinson wrote, produced, and sings lead on "More Love", which he considers one of his most personal compositions. Robinson wrote the song for his wife, Miracles member Claudette Rogers Robinson. Claudette had been a member of the Miracles since 1957, but retired from touring in 1964 after a series of miscarriages. She had a total of 8 miscarriages, which forced her off the road, never to tour with The Miracles again, though she continued to record with them as a non-touring member. On one occasion, the Robinsons had a set of twins that were stillborn. According to Smokey Robinson:

After she had a miscarriage [Claudette] would always tell me she was sorry she had let me down. I would explain that she had not let me down because she was there, she was alive; I wanted the babies, but I didn't know them. I wrote 'More Love' to let her know how I felt about her.

Unlike most other Miracles songs, the track for "More Love" was recorded by Los Angeles session musicians, instead of in Detroit, Michigan by Motown session band The Funk Brothers and Miracles guitarist Marv Tarplin.

Smokey and Claudette Robinson would eventually have two healthy babies, both named after aspects of the Motown corporation: a boy named Berry (after Motown founder Berry Gordy, Jr.) and a girl, Tamla, after the Miracles' record label, Tamla (the Motown Records' subsidiary label for which The Miracles recorded).

Cash Box called it "a feelingful, building romancer...that should appeal to thousands of teen-age listeners."

"More Love" peaked at number 23 on the Billboard Hot 100 the weeks of July 29 and August 5, 1967 and number 19 on the Cash Box Top 100 in the United States, and was a Top 10 Billboard R&B hit, peaking at number five. Although not quite reaching the Pop Top 10 nationally, it was a regional smash, reaching #1 on the Cleveland Ohio Pop Charts for the week of August 11, 1967. The song's "B" side, "Swept For You Baby", was also a popular regional hit, and has inspired cover versions by The Sylvers, The Blenders, and The Tamlins (as "Sweat For You Baby"). In Canada, however, The Miracles' "More Love" became a Top 10 Pop hit, reaching number 8, charting higher than Kim Carnes' subsequent cover version in that country on the Pop and Adult Contemporary charts (#3) years later.

== Chart performance ==
=== Weekly charts ===
Chart (1967)	Peak position
Canada RPM Top Singles	8
Canada RPM Adult Contemporary	3
Canada RPM R&B	11
US Billboard Hot 100	23
US Billboard R&B	5
US Cash Box Top 100	19

=== Year-end charts ===
Chart (1967)	Rank
US Cash Box	89

== Personnel ==
=== The Miracles ===
- Smokey Robinson – lead vocals
- Claudette Rogers Robinson – background vocals
- Ronnie White – background vocals
- Bobby Rogers – background vocals
- Pete Moore – background vocals
- Assorted Los Angeles studio musicians – instrumentation

== Kim Carnes version ==
"More Love"

Single by Kim Carnes

from the album Romance Dance
- B-side: "Changin'"
- Released: June 4, 1980
- Recorded: 1980
- Genre: Pop; soul; synth-pop
- Length: 3:38
- Label: EMI America
- Songwriter: Smokey Robinson
- Producers: George Tobin; Mike Piccirillo

Kim Carnes singles chronology
""Don't Fall in Love with a Dreamer" (with Kenny Rogers)" (1980)	"More Love" (1980)	"Cry Like a Baby" (1980)

Music video
- "More Love" on YouTube

The most successful recording of "More Love" was a 1980 version by American singer Kim Carnes, included on her fifth studio album Romance Dance (1980). Carnes' version of "More Love" peaked at number 10 on the Billboard Hot 100 for the weeks of August 16, 23 and 30, 1980, spent two weeks at number nine on the Cash Box Top 100 and reached number six on Billboard's Adult Contemporary chart. A Spanish-language version of the song, "Más Amor", was also recorded and released in some territories in Latin America. The single was the first top-10 solo hit for Carnes, formerly of The New Christy Minstrels. Despite "More Love" being a success, the follow-up, "Cry Like a Baby", would miss the Top 40, peaking at number 44. This song would be Carnes' biggest solo hit until "Bette Davis Eyes" in 1981.

=== Chart performance ===
==== Weekly charts ====
Chart (1980)	Peak position
Australia (Kent Music Report)	46
Canada Adult Contemporary (RPM)	7
Canada Top Singles (RPM)	13
US Adult Contemporary (Billboard)	6
US Billboard Hot 100	10
US Cash Box Top 100	9
Quebec (ADISQ)	3

==== Year-end charts ====
Chart (1980)	Rank
Canada Top Singles (RPM)	90
US Billboard Hot 100	39
US Cash Box Top 100	63
