= Come On Do the Jerk =

- Dutch release picture sleeve

Single by the Miracles
- B-side: "Baby, Don't You Go"
- Released: November 20, 1964
- Recorded: 1964
- Studio: Hitsville U.S.A. (Studio A)
- Genre: Soul, Novelty song
- Length: 2:53
- Label: Tamla; T 54109
- Songwriters: Smokey Robinson, Warren Moore, Robert Rogers, Donald Whited
- Producers: Smokey Robinson; Robert Rogers

The Miracles singles chronology
"That's What Love Is Made Of" (1964)	"Come On Do the Jerk" (1964)	"Ooo Baby Baby" (1965)

"Come On Do the Jerk" is song by the American R&B group the Miracles, released in 1964 on Motown Records' Tamla label. It was co-written by Miracles members Pete Moore, Bobby Rogers and Smokey Robinson and drummer Donald Whited. A single-only release, it did not appear on any original Miracles studio album, and was the group's last single release of 1964. Robinson and fellow Miracle Bobby Rogers were the song's producers. The flip side, "Baby Don't You Go", was also a popular regional hit but was not released on CD until The 35th Anniversary Collection in 1994. Both sides of this single received new stereo mixes for the 2002 compilation Ooo Baby Baby: The Anthology.

"Come On Do the Jerk" charted at No.50 on the Billboard Hot 100 and at No. 22 on the Cash Box R&B chart.(Billboard had temporarily suspended its R&B chart at this time).

== Background ==
An instructional dance number, this song was one of several based on the jerk, a very popular 1960s "dance craze". Described by Miracles lead singer Smokey Robinson as the intended follow-up to the group's 1963 million-selling smash "Mickey's Monkey" the previous year, "Come On Do the Jerk" was actually recorded in a similar tempo. As the song begins, longtime Miracles drummer Donald "Spike" Whited and Miracles member, guitarist Marv Tarplin begin the song, while Smokey, as the song's narrator, offers the invitation:

- Come on everybody, gather 'round
- get hip to the new sensation
- There's a brand new dance coming to your town
- and it's sweepin' across the nation
- Come on do the jerk

The other Miracles, Ronnie White, Claudette Robinson, Pete Moore, and Bobby Rogers, echo Smokey's lead, with chants of the song's title, in classic call and response style. Then, midway through, Smokey's role changes... from narrator to dance instructor, as he instructs the listener on the Jerk's simple dance steps:

- Now, snap your back...
- like a bullwhip crack...
- now jerk your hip....
- let your backbone slip...

== Credits and personnel ==
=== The Miracles ===
- Smokey Robinson – lead vocals
- Claudette Robinson – backing vocals
- Pete Moore – backing vocals
- Bobby Rogers – backing vocals
- Ronnie White – backing vocals
- Marv Tarplin – lead guitar

== Additional personnel ==
- Don Whited – drums
- The Funk Brothers – additional instrumentation

== Chart performance ==
Chart (1964–65)	Peak position
US Billboard Hot 100	50
US Top 50 in R&B Locations (Cash Box)	22

== Television performances ==
- The Miracles themselves performed Come On Do the Jerk on a telecast of the syndicated Detroit – based teen dance party show Teen Town . The song appears on several Miracles "Greatest Hits" collections, having first appeared on their album, Greatest Hits Vol.2
- The Righteous Brothers, Bill Medley and Bobby Hatfield, performed a cover of this song on a 1964 telecast of the ABC TV series, Shindig!.(available on YouTube).Video on YouTube

== Cover versions ==
- Recording group The T-Bones also recorded an instrumental cover version of The Miracles' "Come On Do the Jerk" on their 1965 LP entitled "Doin' the Jerk".
