= Whole Lot of Shakin' in My Heart (Since I Met You) =

- Dutch release picture sleeve

Single by The Miracles

from the album Away We a Go-Go
- B-side: "Oh Be My Love"
- Released: May 27, 1966
- Recorded: Hitsville USA (Studio A); 4/19/66
- Genre: Pop/soul
- Length: 2:42
- Label: Tamla; T 54205
- Songwriter: Frank Wilson
- Producer: Frank Wilson

The Miracles singles chronology
| "Going to a Go-Go" (1965) | "Whole Lot of Shakin' in My Heart (Since I Met You)" (1966) | "(Come 'Round Here) I'm the One You Need" (1966) |

"Whole Lot Of Shakin' In My Heart (Since I Met You)" is a 1966 R&B song by Motown Records group The Miracles, issued on Motown's Tamla Records subsidiary. Written by Motown staff songwriter Frank Wilson, it was one of only two singles the group released in 1966, taken from their album Away We A Go-Go.

Although the group's billing on their singles remained "The Miracles" up to this point, their billing on the album was changed to "Smokey Robinson and The Miracles," their second album to receive this billing.

== Lyrical and musical content ==
Despite this song's relatively mild success in 1966, "Whole Lot Of Shaking" was one of The Miracles' most dynamic, most propulsive recordings.

This up-tempo song featured rapid-fire vocal interplay between Smokey and the other Miracles, Bobby, Ronnie, Pete, and Claudette, accompanied by equally urgent horns and a hot Funk Brothers rhythm section. Smokey, as the song's narrator, portrays a man whose life has been completely changed by a passionate relationship with his new girl:

"I can't explain the things you do to me, but I'm sure there's an explanation,
Maybe it's the way you carry yourself, or maybe it's your conversation."

His friends also notice the change in him:

"The guys I used to run around with tell me I changed, and I'm acting kind of strange;
But they don't realize, that since I met you, my whole life has been re-arranged."

Song author Frank Wilson later co-wrote The Four Tops' 1970 hit "Still Water (Love)" with Robinson. He also went on to co-write The Temptations' 1967 Top 10 hit "All I Need."

Cash Box described the song as a "hard-driving, fast-moving romantic thumper about a lucky lass who has finally met the guy of her dreams."

== Personnel credits: The Miracles ==
- Smokey Robinson – lead vocals
- Claudette Robinson - background vocals
- Marv Tarplin – guitar
- Pete Moore - background vocals
- Ronnie White - background vocals
- Bobby Rogers - background vocals

== Other credits ==
- Writer–Producer: Frank Wilson
- Other instruments: The Funk Brothers

== Chart success ==
This song was not one of the group's more successful singles, and broke a string of Top 20 Pop hits by the group, only reaching #46 on the Billboard Pop charts, but the tune managed much better on the Billboard R&B listings, reaching the Top 20, peaking at #20.

The Miracles, after a huge year in 1965, took a year off from touring during 1966, and this song's lack of promotion may have been a reason for its relative failure, but it has nevertheless been included in many Miracles "greatest hits" album and CD compilations.

== Cover versions and accolades ==
- "Whole Lot Of Shakin'" has inspired cover versions by The Hellacopters and Marv Johnson (for the Motown revival label Motorcity Records). Its flip side, "Oh Be My Love", like many Miracles "B" sides, was also popular, and has inspired cover versions by Barbara Lewis, The Supremes, and Barbara McNair.
- The Huffington Post referred to this Miracles song as a "classic" and as one of "The 22 Lost Classics Of Motown that Deserve To Be Rediscovered"
- The British "Northern Soul" website "Funky 16 Corners" referred to The Miracles' "Whole Lot Of Shakin' In My Heart" as 'relentless", "A monster", and "first-class, floor-filling, spellbinding Motor City soul."
