= (Come 'Round Here) I'm the One You Need =

Single by Smokey Robinson & the Miracles

from the album Away We a Go-Go
- B-side: "Save Me"
- Released: October 19, 1966
- Recorded: Hitsville U.S.A. (Studio A); September 13, 1966
- Genre: Soul, psychedelic soul
- Length: 2:30
- Label: Tamla; T 54140
- Songwriter: Holland–Dozier–Holland
- Producers: Brian Holland; Lamont Dozier

Smokey Robinson & the Miracles singles chronology
"Whole Lot Of Shakin' In My Heart (Since I Met You)" (1966)	"(Come 'Round Here) I'm the One You Need" (1966)	"The Love I Saw in You Was Just a Mirage" (1967)

"(Come 'Round Here) I'm the One You Need" is a 1966 hit single by Motown group The Miracles, released on Motown Records' Tamla label.

Unlike most Miracles songs, which were written and produced by the group themselves, "I'm the One You Need" was written and produced by Motown's main songwriting and production team Holland–Dozier–Holland, best known for their work with The Supremes and The Four Tops. Holland-Dozier-Holland had written and produced two previous Miracles singles: the Top 10 hit "Mickey's Monkey" and the Top 40 hit "I Gotta Dance to Keep From Crying" (both 1963). "I'm the One You Need" was the final Miracles single released before lead singer Smokey Robinson was given star billing on all of the group's subsequent 45's.

== Background ==
In this popular Miracles tune, Smokey Robinson, as the song's narrator, seeks to comfort a girl he obviously loves, who belongs to another man who cheats on her, and treats her badly:

- Now, You say.....
- Every time you need some affection
- The one you love goes in another direction
- You just sit there, in a daze, reminiscing....
- Cause you know some other lips he's been kissing...

With the solution, to the broken-hearted girl's problem, Smokey continues...

- When you need the love he's never shown you
- 'Come Round Here...
- And, when you need some lovin' arms to hold you...
- 'Come Round Here....
- Cause I may not be the one you want...
- But I know I'm The One You Need.

While Smokey sings lead, The other Miracles, Bobby, Ron, Pete, and Claudette, back him with repeated chants of "Come 'Round Here, Honey Honey...I'm the one you need, Honey Honey"...

Two versions of this song were released, with very notable changes. The first version was released on the single; this version also appears on mono copies of the Miracles' 1966 album Away We a Go-Go. The second version used a different take, was in stereo, and had Smokey's lead more prominent than the single version; this version was released on the stereo LP editions of the album.

== Chart performance ==
The single was a Top 20 Pop Hit, peaking at number 17 on the Billboard Hot 100, and a Top 10 R&B hit, peaking at number four on Billboard's R&B singles chart. In 1971, following the success of the #1 hit "The Tears of a Clown", Tamla-Motown UK decided to re-release this single instead of the newly-recorded follow-up, "I Don't Blame You At All". This re-release peaked at #13 in the UK in February 1971, and had a stronger showing than its late 1966 release, where it peaked at #37. "(Come 'Round Here) I'm the One You Need" was the most successful single featured on their album Away We a Go-Go.

== Personnel: The Miracles ==
- Lead vocals by Smokey Robinson
- Background vocals by Claudette Rogers Robinson, Pete Moore, Ronnie White and Bobby Rogers.
- Guitar by Marv Tarplin
- Other instrumentation by The Funk Brothers

== Cover versions ==
- The song was covered by acts such as The Jackson 5, The Cowsills, and The GP's.
- In 1967 The Miracles themselves recorded an Italian language version, entitled Non sono quello che tu vuoi (I'm not that man you want).

== "B-side" covers ==
- The song's "B" side, "Save Me" was covered in a 1966 ska version as "Rude Boy Prayer" by a group consisting of Alton Ellis, Zoot Sims, Bob Marley and an unknown female vocalist. Despite being highly regarded, this version remains officially unavailable outside its original blank labelled 7" vinyl release.
- The Undertones also covered the song.
