= Andrea Dromm =

American actress (born 1941)

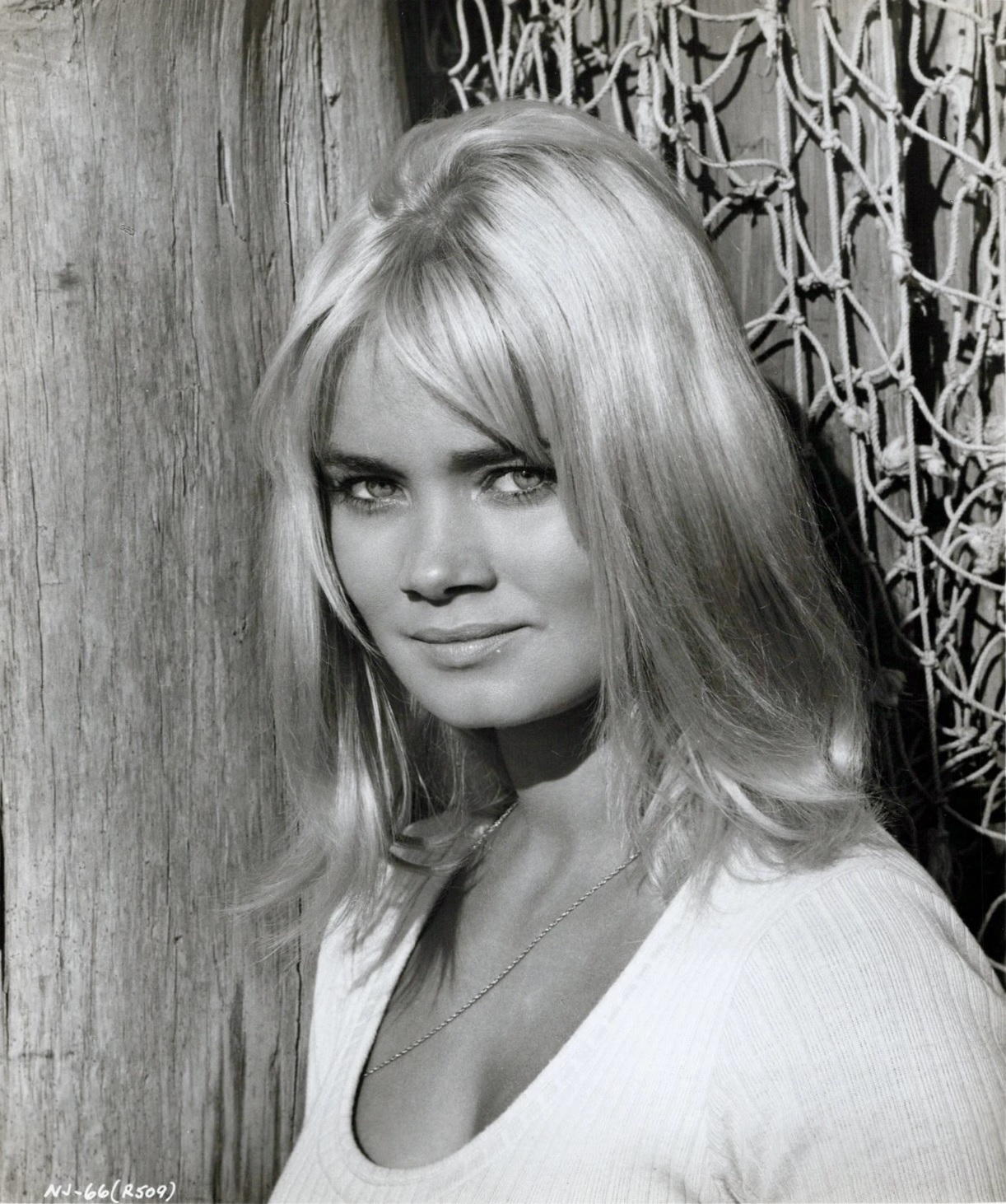
- Dromm in 1966
- Born: February 18, 1941 (age 85); Long Island, New York, U.S.
- Education: University of Connecticut
- Occupations: Model, actress
- Years active: 1965–1967
- Known for: Clairol Summer blonde commercial
- Notable work: National Airlines

Andrea Dromm (born February 18, 1941) is a former American model and actress. Her father was an engineer, and she attended school in Patchogue and later in Greensburg, Pennsylvania.

== Career ==
Dromm's career began as a child model at the age of six, but she later felt it interfered with her school work. She attended the University of Connecticut, where she studied drama, acting in student productions of The Diary of Anne Frank, The Crucible, and Romeo and Juliet. She dropped out and hitchhiked to San Francisco, but eventually returned for her degree, after which she began work as a New York model, signing with the Eileen Ford Agency. Her career rose dramatically after her appearance in a National Airlines television commercial in 1963 as the stewardess asking "Is this any way to run an airline? You bet it is!"

On the strength of the ad's popularity, she was urged to seek a Hollywood career. Her first job was in an episode of Star Trek playing Yeoman Smith in "Where No Man Has Gone Before" (1965), the second pilot in the series.

Dromm then moved on to do The Russians Are Coming, the Russians Are Coming (1966), in which she played a teenaged babysitter who falls in love with a handsome Soviet sailor. She then co-starred in Come Spy with Me (1967), a spy spoof that fell flat. She also appeared as hostess of a TV special on surfing. After this experience, she returned to New York modeling, and for a time was the Clairol "Summer Blonde" girl who appeared in television and print ads.

In 1988, People reported that she was living on real estate investments and splitting her time between homes in The Hamptons, Long Island and Palm Beach, Florida.

== Filmography ==
- The Russians Are Coming, the Russians Are Coming (1966) as Alison Palmer
- Come Spy with Me (1967) as Jill Parsons

== Television ==
Year	Title	Role	Notes
1966	Star Trek: The Original Series	Yeoman Smith	S1:E3, "Where No Man Has Gone Before"
