= Mickey's Monkey (song) =

- Dutch release picture sleeve

Single by the Miracles

from the album The Miracles Doin' Mickey's Monkey
- B-side: "Whatever Makes You Happy"
- Released: July 26, 1963
- Recorded: July 9–10, 1963
- Studio: Hitsville U.S.A., Detroit
- Genre: Soul
- Length: 2:48
- Label: Tamla; T 54083
- Songwriter: Holland–Dozier–Holland
- Producers: Brian Holland; Lamont Dozier

The Miracles singles chronology
"I Can Take a Hint" (1963)	"Mickey's Monkey" (1963)	"I Gotta Dance to Keep From Crying" (1963)

"Mickey's Monkey" is a 1963 song recorded by the R&B group the Miracles on Motown Records' Tamla label. It was written and produced by Motown's main songwriting team of Brian Holland, Lamont Dozier, and Eddie Holland, who later went on to write two more Miracles hit singles, the Top 40 "I Gotta Dance to Keep From Crying", and the Top 20 "(Come 'Round Here) I'm The One You Need". This was an unusual writing situation for the Miracles, as most of their songs were generally composed by the group members themselves.

== Overview ==
Described by Miracles lead singer Smokey Robinson as "One of our biggest records ever in life", "Mickey's Monkey" was a Billboard Top 10 Pop smash, reaching No.8 on that chart, and a Top 10 R&B hit as well, reaching No.3. One of the group's most powerful singles, it was also the Miracles' third million-selling record in as many years, after "Shop Around" (1961) and "You've Really Got A Hold On Me" (1962). It was also a Top 10 hit in Canada, peaking at #10 (see chart below).

A comical story about "A cat named Mickey from out of town" (William "Mickey" Stevenson) who "spread his new dance all around", the song helped popularize "The Monkey" as a national dance craze in the early 1960s. In the Motown DVD release, Smokey Robinson & The Miracles: The Definitive Performances, Smokey exclaimed that this song began when he spotted Lamont Dozier playing its initial chords on the piano at the Motown studios one day. (It has been described by many rock historians as having a beat influenced by the music of Bo Diddley). While playing, Dozier was singing the song's famous chorus: "Lum de lum de lai-ai". Intrigued, Smokey then requested that Lamont record it for The Miracles, at the time Motown's top group, to which Lamont agreed.

Recorded in the Motown studios with an intended "live party" feel, the track begins with Smokey Robinson asking: "Alright, is everybody ready?" to which the crowd, in unison, responds enthusiastically: "Yes!". This is followed by Smokey saying: "Alright now, here we go. A one, a two, a one, two, three, four", before the drum issue in the chorus.

In addition to The Miracles' contribution, "Mickey's Monkey" also featured background vocals by Mary Wilson of The Supremes, famed Detroit Dee Jay "Jockey Jack" Gibson, Martha & The Vandellas, and members of The Temptations and The Marvelettes. One of the most famous of the early Motown hits, "Mickey's Monkey" was often used by The Miracles as their closing song on the legendary "Motortown Revue" touring shows in the early 1960s, where it usually "brought the house down".

== Chart performance ==
Chart (1963)	Peak position
US R&B Singles	3
US Billboard Hot 100	8
Canada CHUM Chart	10

== Other versions ==
This song has inspired later versions by Mother's Finest, Martha & The Vandellas, The Hollies, Lou Christie, Cannibal & the Headhunters, The Young Rascals, John Cougar Mellencamp and The Supremes.

It was also used in the soundtrack of the award-winning 1964 Ivan Dixon film Nothing But a Man, and the 1998 motion picture Simon Birch. The Miracles can be seen performing "Mickey's Monkey" on The PBS special Red, White, and Rock(on VHS & DVD), the 1985 Sony/Dave Clark Productions/ Picture Music VHS release Ready Steady Go Special Edition: The Sounds of Motown (VHS), and the 2006 Motown/Universal DVD release: Smokey Robinson & The Miracles: The Definitive Performances 1963-1987.They also performed the song before an enthusiastic live audience at the Santa Monica Civic Auditorium in 1964 on the American International Pictures release, The T.A.M.I. Show . This song has appeared on virtually every Miracles "greatest hits" collection and anthology, except for their Greatest Hits, Vol.2 album and CD.

The song's B-side was "Whatever Makes You Happy", a song that, while not charting nationally, did become a hit on several regional charts, and has inspired a cover version by singer Jacki Gore. It was also the title cut of the 1993 Motown/Rhino CD compilation, Smokey Robinson & The Miracles: Whatever Makes You Happy (More of the Best).

== Personnel ==
The Miracles

- Smokey Robinson — lead vocals
- Claudette Robinson — background vocals
- Bobby Rogers — background vocals
- Pete Moore — background vocals
- Ronnie White — background vocals
- Marv Tarplin — guitar

Additional personnel

- Mary Wilson — background vocals
- Martha Reeves — background vocals

& The Vandellas:

- Rosalind Ashford — background vocals
- Annette Beard — background vocals
- "Jockey Jack" Gibson — background vocals
- The Temptations — background vocals
- The Marvelettes — background vocals
- The Funk Brothers — other instrumentation
- Brian Holland — producer
- Lamont Dozier — producer
