= Dave Appell =

American musician (1922-2014)

- Born: March 24, 1922; Philadelphia, Pennsylvania, U.S.
- Died: November 18, 2014 (aged 92)
- Occupation(s): Musician, arranger and record producer
- Formerly of: The Applejacks

David Appell (March 24, 1922 – November 18, 2014) was an American musician, arranger and record producer born in Philadelphia.

== Career ==
Appell (pronounced "AP-el") is associated mainly with the Cameo-Parkway record label, in whose history he played a substantial part. He started working as an arranger for several United States Navy big bands in the mid-1940s during his service in World War II, including Jimmie Lunceford's black orchestra.

He later arranged for dance orchestras, including Benny Carter and Earl "Fatha" Hines. He recorded for a while on Decca Records as the Dave Appell Four, until Paul Cohen of Decca suggested he change the group name to the Applejacks. Appell also became a publisher, joining ASCAP in 1955, collaborating with Max Freedman.

He appeared prominently in the 1956 Alan Freed film, Don't Knock the Rock, and worked for a while as the studio band and music director on the Ernie Kovacs TV and radio shows in Philadelphia. Next Appell and the Applejacks were playing in Las Vegas, but they soon began to pine for their hometown and returned to Philadelphia, where they started working for Cameo Records, a label founded by Kal Mann and Bernie Lowe.

Appell did background vocals, session work as a guitarist, engineering, arranging and producing. The first hit artist on the Cameo label was Charlie Gracie with "Butterfly". Appell's band backed Gracie on that million-seller in 1957, and on the singer's subsequent hits, "Fabulous", "Ninety-Nine Ways" and "Wander in' Eyes". In 1958 Appell and his group backed John Zacherle on his Top 10 novelty hit Dinner With Drac.

In the summer of 1958, Appell got an idea for a song from the Philadelphia String Band of a marching-type song with a dance beat. He wrote an instrumental song called "The Mexican Hat Rock", a jumped-up version of the old "Mexican Hat Dance", that he had his studio band record. The song was released under their own name on Cameo that fall and became a big dance hit on American Bandstand, reaching # 16 on the charts. The Applejacks also charted with "Rocka-Conga" (# 38) later in the year.

Appell went on to become the leader of Cameo-Parkway's house band, backing such artists as Chubby Checker, Bobby Rydell, The Dovells, Dee Dee Sharp and The Orlons. In the cases of the aforementioned act's records Appell also arranged and, in many instances, produced, and even co-wrote with Kal Mann, songs such as "Let's Twist Again", "Bristol Stomp", "Mashed Potato Time", and "South Street". These were the years of the twist and other dance crazes, in the launching of which Appell played a vital role. Appell left Cameo in 1964.

In the 1970s he had success with his productions for Tony Orlando and Dawn, including the # 1 hits "Knock Three Times" (1970) and "Tie a Yellow Ribbon Round the Ole Oak Tree" (1973), on Bell Records in New York City. Appell's co-producer at the time was Hank Medress, a founding member of The Tokens musical group.

Appell died on November 18, 2014. Cause of death is unknown. He was survived by his children Roz (Robert Purdy) Appell Purdy, Lynda Appell and granddaughter Sara Millett.
