= Tim Marshall (radio host) =

- Born: Timothy C. Marshall; Mount Holly Township, New Jersey, United States
- Presenting career
- Show: R&B Showcase Radio Show
- Stations: WGLS (FM), WBZC (FM), WIP (AM), WTMR (AM), WAYV (FM), WPWT (FM), WNAP (AM) On-Line, World-wide
- Style: Classic To Contemporary R&B
- Country: United States

Tim Marshall is a South Jersey radio personality, music producer, journalist, concert promoter, educator, and humanitarian. His career in broadcasting began in 1987 at Rowan University in Glassboro, New Jersey. Tim Marshall's professional radio affiliations include WTMR, Camden, New Jersey; WAYV FM Atlantic City, New Jersey; WPWT FM, WEJM FM, and 610 WIP-AM in Philadelphia; and WNAP Norristown, PA. His R&B Showcase radio program currently airs on WBZC-FM Pemberton, NJ.

Marshall has been a resident of Willingboro Township, New Jersey. Male stripper

== R&B Showcase Radio Show ==
Marshall is a graduate of Rowan University, Glassboro, New Jersey with a bachelor's degree in communications and a master's degree in education. His Rhythm & Blues Showcase radio show made its debut on the college's WGLS-FM. He was mentored in radio by WGLS-FM program director Frank Hogan. Marshall patterned his show after Philadelphia radio personalities Harvey Holiday, Butterball, Georgie Woods, Jerry Blavat, and Hy Lit; and then contemporary hosts Doug Henderson Jr. and Jerry Wells of WDAS-FM. He is the cousin of notable WCBS-FM radio personality Bobby Jay.

The musical variety of Marshall's radio show included a mix of Soul and Motown with the contemporary sounds of the day. This was during an era when Urban Contemporary Radio stations like New York's WBLS, or Philadelphia's WUSL-FM played only new music by artists like the Gap Band, Luther Vandross, or L.L. Cool J. Oldies formats were restricted to Sunday nights. The freedom of the college radio format allowed Marshall to feature artists like The Temptations, Four Tops, Wilson Pickett, and Sly & the Family Stone alongside Cameo, Run D.M.C., Lisa Lisa and Cult Jam, and Al B Sure!. This format was soon adopted and credited to mainstream radio stations like WRKS-FM, New York, or Philly's WDAS-FM in 1988 as Urban Adult Contemporary.

Marshall's Rhythm and Blues Showcase radio show was rechristened the Urban Showcase in 1989 with a special segment spotlighting Soul Classics. Soon after he reverted to his original Rhythmic Soul format and shortened the shows name to the R&B Showcase. Marshall's focus was on introducing new R&B acts to his listeners and reviving the careers of the legendary artists by featuring their new recordings. It would be common to hear songs like The Spinners's mid eighties singles "Put us Together Again," or "I Found An Angel;" The Temptations "All I Want From You;" or Diana Ross's version of Jackie Ross's Selfish One. These tracks went virtually unnoticed on conventional radio stations. In addition to the recording artists, Marshall also interviewed producers, songwriters and record label executives who would share insight on the music industry, their careers and current projects in an educational style forum.

== Commercial radio career ==
In the late 1980s Marshall was hired as a producer and music programmer at 610 WIP in Philadelphia. This was prior to the station adopting its Sports Radio format. For a short time he was the voice of WNAP Norristown, Pennsylvania's "Gospel Highway Eleven." Marshall continued with the Gospel format during the summer of 1988 at WTMR 800 AM, Camden, New Jersey. The station broadcast religious music to the Philadelphia area. Marshall continued to host the R&B Showcase on WGLS in Glassboro until graduation in 1991. During the summer of the same year, Marshall was recruited by Program Director Sab Capelli to join the on-air staff at Atlantic City's "Best Mix Music Station" WAYV. The Jersey shore radio station at that time was located just outside the "Days Inn on the boardwalk near the Tropicana Hotel & Casino. Marshall remained for nearly two years hosting a Top 40 show nights and weekends. In 1995 Tim Marshall joined the on-air staff of WBZC-FM where his R&B Showcase radio show has been a mainstay.

== Concert promotions and charitable events ==
Since the early 1990s, Marshall has served as a promoter and chairperson for a host of charitable concerts and events including; the Linda Creed Breast Cancer Foundation, Bill Deal Cystic Fibrosis Fund, the Damon Harris Prostate Cancer Foundation, and Hold on to Education Foundation inc. He has hosted concerts and emceed shows at venues like the Investors Bank Performing Arts Center, Radisson Hotels, Clarion Hotels, and Patriots Theater at the Trenton War Memorial Auditorium in South Jersey; and various red carpet events outside the Kimmel Center for the Performing Arts, and the Doubletree Hotel on the Avenue of the Arts, Philadelphia. On September 7, 2009, he hosted the annual Willingboro Jazz Festival at Millcreek Park in Willingboro Township, New Jersey with special guest Spyro Gyra, Marilyn Marshall, Stephen Tirpak, the Blue Method and Cintron. He has also presented or hosted concerts by The Temptations' former vocalists Richard Street, and Damon Harris; G.C. Cameron of The Spinners; The Temptations Review featuring Dennis Edwards; The Delfonics, The Intruders; Braille (Bryan Winchester); Bluesman Mikey Junior; MTV's Making the Band vocal group LMNT; Gil Saunders of Harold Melvin & the Blue Notes; and the first full-length concert by American Idol (Season 1)'s Justin Guarini. In 2014 Marshall hosted the Golden Decade of Disco Diva's Live Concert at the historic Grand Opera House (Wilmington, Delaware) featuring Evelyn Champagne King; The Three Degrees, and Grammy Award-winning arranger Bobby Eli's Groove Yard Band.

== Stage productions ==
Marshall has acted in various stage plays for Hollywood East Productions in Philadelphia, and Stageworks Touring Company based in South Jersey. His roles include the male lead in Lorraine Hansberry's To Be Young, Gifted and Black, and A Raisin in the Sun where he recreated Sidney Poitier's role of Walter Lee Younger. He portrayed Sheriff Will Masters in William Inge's Bus Stop (play) and the Bartender in Jimmie "Mr. Hollywood" Brooks "Living In the Fast Lane." His stage appearances also include performances at Fort Dix Officer's Club in New Hanover Township, NJ, and McGuire Air Force Base in Burlington County, New Jersey.

== Awards ==
On May 11, 2002, Marshall was presented an Award of Merit by the members of the Toronto City Council in Canada in congratulations for his charitable works for various non-profit organizations. He was also honored with a Proclamation from Mayor Eddie Campbell Jr. of Willingboro Township, New Jersey; State Senator Diane Allen with a New Jersey Senate resolution; and an Image Award from the Delaware Valley Chapter of the NAACP. On May 18, 2013, Marshall and his radio show co-host Larry Cotton were honored with a New Jersey State Senate Proclamation for their charitable works at a Benefit Gala for Hold On To Education Foundation. On Saturday August 17, 2013 Marshall was inducted into the R&B Music Hall of Fame honored for 26 years as a radio host and humanitarian. The event was held at Cleveland State University's Waetjen Auditorium. In July 2014 Marshall was invited by the Burlington County Times newspaper to be the keynote speaker for the annual Burlington County Forty Under 40 Event. He was recognized for his impressive career achievements and unparalleled community involvement. Marshall and his radio show co-host Larry Cotton were presented Golden Mic Award honors by the Global Entertainment Media Arts Foundation on Friday October 10, 2014 at the Deep Blue Modern American Restaurant in Wilmington, Delaware. He also received a Proclamation for his creative works as a Radio Personality, Community Advocate, Youth Mentor, and Humanitarian by the City of Philadelphia. Marshall is featured in the 2014 edition of the book "Philly Pop, Rock, Rhythm & Blues" by screenwriter, author and actor James Rosin.

== Bibliography ==
- Rosin, James (2013, rev. 2014). Philly Pop, Rock, Rhythm & Blues: A Look Back at the Musical History of Philadelphia. Philadelphia: The Autumn Road Company. ISBN 978-1-4675-8133-2
