= R&B Showcase Radio Show =

American radio program

- Genre: Classic to contemporary Motown, pop, disco and soul music entertainment news
- Running time: Approx. 3 hrs. (including commercials)
- Country of origin: United States
- Language(s): English
- Hosted by: Tim Marshall; Larry Cotton; Regular guest hosts: Fred Cilurso (1987); Richard Street; Damon Harris; Ms. Marilyn Marshall; Kevyn Marshall; Frank Johnson; Jeff Weiman; Kyle Allen McCarty; Kevin White; Julian Ellzy; Pete Innaurato; David Bynoe
- Created by: Tim Marshall
- Original release: September 1986 – present
- Audio format: Stereophonic sound
- Opening theme: "Get Ready" Temptations 1991
- Ending theme: "Neither One of Us" Gladys Knight & the Pips, 1973
- Website: rhythmandbluesshowcase.com

R&B Showcase Radio Show is a program originally created and hosted by American radio personality Tim Marshall. The show began in 1986, and features classic to contemporary rhythm and blues music with a focus on preserving the legacy of the pioneer recording artists. The broadcasts include music news, show reviews, concert updates and in-depth interviews with independent and national acts. International music journalist Larry Cotton joined the program as co-host in 2003.

== History ==
R&B Showcase Radio Show made its debut airing Wednesday afternoons from 3-6 pm on WGLS FM in Glassboro, New Jersey in 1986. The format is a blend of classic hits with current artists of the day. The styles of music presented on the program includes Motown, pop, soul, jazz, funk, blue-eyed soul and mainstream hip-hop. The broadcasts include interviews with musicians, producers, singers, songwriters, promoters, record label executives, educators, authors, publishers, and recording artists sharing behind-the-scenes information on the music industry and their creations. The show also promotes current and new projects from these artists.

Tim Marshall is the creator, host and producer of the radio program. He is a veteran broadcaster whose affiliations include WIP, Philadelphia; WNAP, Norristown, Pennsylvania; WPWT FM, Philadelphia; WTMR, Camden, New Jersey, and WAYV, Atlantic City, New Jersey.

The R&B Showcase Radio Show airs worldwide via the internet. The terrestrial radio version has aired in South Jersey and Philadelphia on Monday nights on WBZC FM since 1995.

In 2003 international music journalist Larry Cotton of the UK's In the Basement magazine signed on as co-host and has helped the program gain international recognition. He is an advocate for the historical and cultural preservation of R&B music. Cotton, a former recording artist and actor, toured with many of the pioneer acts during the 1960s and 1970s. He was a TV dance show regular on Hy-Lit, Joe Niagra, and Georgie Woods television programs. He was a regular guest co-host on WRDV FM in Philadelphia with Flamingo Al Brewster. He led an international campaign to include Motown girl group The Marvelettes in the Rock & Roll Hall of Fame.

== Weekly segments ==
Regular guest co-hosts on the program have included recording artists Richard Street and Damon Harris of The Temptations, and Motown promotion man Weldon McDougal. The show's hosts Tim Marshall and Larry Cotton have also provided students an opportunity to interview legendary recording artists live on the radio as part of their school projects. Rhythm and Views and Concert News is a segment presented by Cotton, informing the listeners of the current happenings on the local, national and international music scene. The R&B Countdown and the annual Super Soul Bowl – Battle of the groups are also features on the radio program.

== Events and fundraisers ==
Marshall and Cotton have made frequent live appearances hosting dances and concerts, and supporting benefits and fundraisers. Their humanitarian efforts as hosts of the radio program include working with the Rhythm and Blues Foundation, Vocal Group Hall of Fame, Motown Alumni Association, and Hold On To Education Foundation. Marshall and Cotton have also hosted workshops for youth interested in careers in the entertainment industry.

== Honors and awards ==
The R&B Showcase Radio Show is included as one of the official radio programs of the R&B Music Hall of Fame. Both Marshall as a radio host and Cotton as an international journalist were inducted into the R&B Music Hall of Fame on August 17, 2013 in Cleveland, Ohio. Their names are also enshrined in the Rock and Roll Hall of Fame archives. Marshall and Cotton have received New Jersey state Senate proclamations for their contribution to the music industry preserving the cultural heritage of rhythm and blues music and its creators. They have been honored for their work as humanitarians working with the Linda Creed Breast Cancer Foundation, Damon Harris Prostate Cancer Foundation, and Hold On To Education Foundation.
