= Let Your Hair Down (The Temptations song) =

- French release picture sleeve

Single by The Temptations

from the album 1990
- B-side: "Ain't No Justice"
- Released: November 1973
- Genre: Soul, Funk
- Length: 2:40
- Label: Gordy (Motown)
- Songwriter(s): Norman Whitfield
- Producer(s): Norman Whitfield

The Temptations singles chronology
"Law of the Land" (1973)	"Let Your Hair Down" (1973)	"Heavenly" (1974)

"Let Your Hair Down" is a 1973 single by American vocal group The Temptations. The track appeared on the Temptations 1973 album, 1990.

== Song Background ==
Dennis Edwards sings lead and the group is backed by Rose Royce for this track.

== Chart performance ==
Released as a single in November of that year, it reached the number one spot on the R&B Singles Chart in February 1974 (their last R&B #1 with collaborator Norman Whitfield) but was less successful on the Pop Singles Chart, stalling at #27.

== Personnel ==
- Lead vocals by Dennis Edwards
- Background vocals by Richard Street, Damon Harris, Otis Williams and Melvin Franklin
- Instrumentation by Rose Royce
- Written and produced by Norman Whitfield

== Cover Versions ==
- Funk singer Yvonne Fair also recorded the song for her debut (and only) album, 1975's The Bitch is Black.
