= Greetings! We're The Monitors =

Studio album by The Monitors
- Released: November 1968
- Recorded: 1965–1968
- Studio: Hitsville U.S.A., Detroit, Michigan, United States
- Genre: Soul music
- Length: 31:36
- Language: English
- Label: Soul Records
- Producer: Henry Cosby; Robert Staunton; Mickey Stevenson; Robert Walker

The Monitors chronology
Greetings! We're The Monitors (1968)	Grazing in the Grass (1990)

Greetings! We're The Monitors is the debut album by The Monitors, released in 1968.

== Recording and release ==
After recording several singles for Motown—including a charting cover of "Greetings (This Is Uncle Sam)" in 1966—and touring to support more successful artists, Berry Gordy recommended that the group get their own album and moved them from the V.I.P. Records subsidiary to Soul Records for the release. It is composed of material that the group recorded from the three-year span of 1965 to 1968. Richard Street, who would later replace Paul Williams in The Temptations, is the lead singer of this group. Shortly after the album was released, the Monitors disbanded and didn't get back together again until 1990, when the group released a reunion album entitled Grazing in the Grass.

== Reception ==
A brief review in Billboard recommended this release to retailers for having a "rugged and romantic array of soul numbers" and predicted chart success that did not materialize for them. Editors at AllMusic Guide scored this release 2.5 out of five stars, with critic Rick A. Bueche characterizing it as "a rather bland set", but praising Richard Street's vocals. The same outlet also reviewed the compilation 1999 The Elgins Meet The Monitors, which includes the entirety of this album as well as several Monitors b-sides, with reviewer Andrew Hamilton also noting Street's vocals, which provide a continuity in the group's varied singles output.

== Track listing ==
1. "Bring Back the Love" (James Dean, Jack Alan Goga, Brian Holland, and William Weatherspoon) – 2:56
2. "Share a Little Love with Me" (Curtis Colbert and Ivy Jo Hunter) – 2:26
3. "Step by Step (Hand in Hand)" (Dean and Weatherspoon) – 2:52
4. "The Further You Look, The Less You See" (William Robinson and Norman Whitfield) – 2:17
5. "Since I Lost You Girl" (Johnny Bristol and Harvey Fuqua) – 2:32
6. "Baby Make Your Own Sweet Music" (Sandy Linzer and Denny Randell) – 2:30
7. "Greetings (This Is Uncle Sam)" (Robert Bateman, P. Bennet, Ronald Dunbar, Holland, Lawrence Horn, and The Valadiers) – 2:54
8. "Time Is Passin' By" (Dean and Weatherspoon) – 2:43
9. "Say You" (Robert Dobyne, Charles Jones, and Robert Staunton) – 2:30
10. "Number One in Your Heart" (Bristol, Harvey Fuqua, Wilbur Jackson, and Clyde Wilson) – 2:50
11. "Serve Yourself a Cup of Happiness" (Dean and Weatherspoon) – 2:19
12. "You Share the Blame" (Robinson and Ronald White) – 2:47

== Personnel ==
The Monitors

- Sandra Fagin – vocals
- John "Maurice" Fagin – vocals
- Warren Harris – vocals
- Richard Street – lead vocals

Additional personnel

- The Andantes – backing vocals on "Say You"
  - Marlene Barrow
  - Louvain Demps
  - Jackie Hicks
- Henry Cosby – production on "Greetings (This Is Uncle Sam)" and "Number One in Your Heart"
- Detroit Symphony Orchestra – instrumentation on "Say You"
- The Funk Brothers – instrumentation
- Reggie Goodwin – liner notes
- Robert Staunton – production on "Say You"
- Mickey Stevenson – production on "Greetings (This Is Uncle Sam)" and "Number One in Your Heart"
- Robert Walker – production on "Say You"

== See also ==
- List of 1968 albums
