= Masterpiece (The Temptations album) =

Studio album by The Temptations
- Released: February 21, 1973
- Recorded: September 1972 – January 1973
- Studios: Hitsville USA, Detroit
- Genres: Soul, funk, psychedelic soul
- Length: 42:08
- Labels: Gordy; GS 965
- Producer: Norman Whitfield

The Temptations chronology
All Directions (1972)	Masterpiece (1973)	The Temptations in Japan (1973)

Alternative covers
- An alternative re-edition cover

Masterpiece is a 1973 album by The Temptations for the Gordy (Motown) label, produced and written by Norman Whitfield.

Professional ratings
Review scores
Source	Rating
AllMusic	3/5 stars
Christgau's Record Guide	C+
The Rolling Stone Album Guide	3/5 stars

== Track listing ==
All tracks written and produced by Norman Whitfield.

Side one
No.	Title	Lead singer(s)	Length
1.	"Hey Girl (I Like Your Style)"	Richard Street	4:36
2.	"Masterpiece"	Dennis Edwards, Otis Williams, Street, Damon Harris, Melvin Franklin	13:49

Side two
No.	Title	Lead singer(s)	Length
1.	"Ma"	Street, Harris, Franklin	4:46
2.	"Law of the Land"	Edwards, Harris, Street	5:08
3.	"Plastic Man"	Edwards, Harris, Franklin, Street	5:53
4.	"Hurry Tomorrow"	Harris	8:06

== Personnel ==
- Dennis Edwards - vocals (tenor/baritone)
- Damon Harris - vocals (first tenor/falsetto)
- Richard Street - vocals (third tenor)
- Melvin Franklin - vocals (bass)
- Otis Williams - vocals (second tenor)
- Norman Whitfield - producer, composer
- Paul Riser - arranger
- Orson Lewis - engineer
- Asari Ghraham - creative assistant to Norman Whitfield
- Des Strobel - design
- Parvis Sadighian - sculpture (for album cover image)
- Jim Britt - liner photo
- Instrumentation by The Funk Brothers:
  - Earl Van Dyke - piano, organ
  - Johnny Griffith - organ
  - Robert Ward - guitar
  - Melvin "Wah-Wah Watson" Ragin - guitar
  - Joe Messina - guitar
  - Paul Warren - guitar
  - Robert White - guitar
  - Eddie Willis - guitar
  - Aaron Smith - drums
  - Richard "Pistol" Allen - drums
  - Uriel Jones - drums
  - Andrew Smith - drums
  - Leroy Taylor - bass guitar
  - Bob Babbitt - bass guitar
  - Eddie Watkins Jr. - bass guitar
  - Eddie "Bongo" Brown - bongos, congas
  - Jack Ashford - tambourine, maracas, sticks
  - Jack Brokensha - timpani, vibes, bells, gourd
  - Maurice Davis - trumpet
  - Ted Lucas - harmonica

== Singles history ==
- "Masterpiece" (Vocal)
  - Gordy single 7126, February 1, 1973; *B-side: "Masterpiece" (Instrumental)
- "Plastic Man"
  - Gordy single 7129, May 10, 1973; B-side: "Hurry Tomorrow"
- "Hey Girl (I Like Your Style)"
  - Gordy single 7131, July 24, 1973; B-side: "Ma"
- "Law of the Land"
  - Tamla-Motown single TMG-866, 1973 (UK only); B-side: "Run Charlie Run" (from All Directions)

== Charts ==
=== Album ===
Chart (1973)	Peak position
French Albums (SNEP)	6
German Albums (Offizielle Top 100)	17
Spanish Albums (AFE)	13
UK Albums (OCC)	28
US Billboard 200	7
US Top R&B Albums	1

==== Year-end charts ====
Chart (1973)	Peak position
French Albums (SNEP)	51
German Albums (Offizielle Top 100)	47
US Top R&B Albums	15
US Billboard 200	56

=== Singles ===
Year	Name	US	US R&B	UK
1973	Masterpiece (Vocal)	7	1	-
1973	Plastic Man	40	8	-
1973	Hey Girl (I Like Your Style)	35	2	-
1973	Law of the Land	-	-	41

== Certifications ==
Region	Certification	Certified units/sales
France (SNEP)	Gold	100,000^{*}
United States (RIAA)	Gold	500,000^{^}
^{*} Sales figures based on certification alone.^{^} Shipments figures based on certification alone.

== See also ==
- List of number-one R&B albums of 1973 (U.S.)
