= Mother Nature (The Temptations song) =

- Italian release picture sleeve

Single by The Temptations

from the album All Directions
- B-side: "Funky Music Sho Nuff Turns Me On"
- Released: 1972
- Songwriters: Nick Zesses and Dino Fekaris
- Producer: Norman Whitfield

"Mother Nature" is a 1972 R&B single by The Temptations. It was written by Nick Zesses and Dino Fekaris and produced by Norman Whitfield, and was the first single on their album All Directions.

== Personnel ==
- Lead vocals by Dennis Edwards
- Background vocals by Damon Harris, Richard Street, Otis Williams and Melvin Franklin
- Instrumentation by The Funk Brothers

== Chart performance ==
"Mother Nature" reached number 27 on the Billboard R&B singles chart and number 92 on the Hot 100.
