= 1990 (The Temptations album) =

Studio album by The Temptations
- Released: December 7, 1973
- Recorded: 1973
- Genre: Soul; funk; psychedelic soul
- Length: 37:31
- Label: Gordy
- Producer: Norman Whitfield

The Temptations chronology
The Temptations in Japan (1973)	1990 (1973)	A Song for You (1975)

Singles from 1990
- 1. "Let Your Hair Down" Released: November 1973

1990 is a 1973 album by The Temptations for the Gordy (Motown) label, their final LP written and produced by Norman Whitfield.

== Music and lyrics ==
The LP was the center of a number of problems. The Temptations were dissatisfied with Whitfield's socially conscious message tracks, which were by now failing commercially, and desired to get back to singing ballads. Whitfield relented some here, placing message tracks such as "1990" and "Ain't No Justice" alongside love songs such as "Heavenly" and "You've Got My Soul on Fire".

== Release and promotion ==
The album's first single, the Rose Royce-backed and Dennis Edwards-led funk track "Let Your Hair Down", was its only Top 40 hit. The ballad "Heavenly", sung by Richard Street and Damon Harris, was caught in the center of a disc jockey boycott against Motown. A Motown executive did not thank the United States' DJs while accepting an award for the Temptations at the 1974 American Music Awards, and, as a result, the DJs refused to play "Heavenly". "You've Got My Soul on Fire", another Edwards-led funk track, also stalled out on the pop charts.

The Temptations remained dissatisfied with Whitfield's "slave-driver" like production mentality and his tendency to overshadow the Temptations' contributions to their own records by emphasising his production techniques and creating extended instrumental tracks with only a few verses of vocals. Group leader Otis Williams complained to Motown chief Berry Gordy, who replaced Whitfield with Jeffrey Bowen for their next LP, 1975's A Song for You. Whitfield left Motown soon afterward, and started his own label, Whitfield Records, which released several hits from Rose Royce.

== Critical reception ==
Professional ratings
Review scores
Source	Rating
AllMusic	3.5/5 stars
Christgau's Record Guide	C−

Reviewing in Christgau's Record Guide: Rock Albums of the Seventies (1981), Robert Christgau wrote: "Not only isn't this good Motown, it isn't good Motown psychedelic—except for some sharp strumming on the title track (a half-assed indictment of/tribute to America) it never takes off rhythmically or vocally."

== Track listing ==
All tracks written by Norman Whitfield.

Side one
No.	Title	Lead singer(s)	Length
1.	"Let Your Hair Down"	Dennis Edwards	2:40
2.	"I Need You"	Damon Harris	3:05
3.	"Heavenly"	Richard Street, Harris	3:57
4.	"You've Got My Soul on Fire"	Edwards	3:53
5.	"Ain't No Justice"	Edwards, Street, Melvin Franklin, Harris, Otis Williams	6:08

Side two
No.	Title	Lead singer(s)	Length
1.	"1990"	Edwards	4:06
2.	"Zoom"	Edwards, Street, Franklin, Harris, Williams	13:42

== Personnel ==
- Dennis Edwards – vocals
- Damon Harris – vocals
- Richard Street – vocals
- Melvin Franklin – vocals
- Otis Williams – vocals
- Norman Whitfield – producer
- The Funk Brothers and Rose Royce – instrumentation
- Aaron Smith – drums

== Charts ==
Chart (1973)	Peak position
Australian Albums (Kent Music Report)	98
Finnish Albums (Suomen virallinen lista)	24
German Albums (Offizielle Top 100)	25
Japanese Albums (Oricon)	46
Spanish Albums (AFE)	13
US Billboard 200	19
