= Funky Music Sho' 'Nuff Turns Me On =

Single by Edwin Starr

"Funky Music Sho Nuff Turns Me On" is a 1971 funk/soul song written by Barrett Strong and Norman Whitfield, first and most successfully recorded by Edwin Starr.

== Chart performance ==
Chart (1971)	Peak position
US Billboard Hot 100	64
US Billboard Best Selling Soul Singles	6

== Cover versions ==
Other artists who have recorded the song include:

- In 1972, The Temptations included it as the b-side of their single "Mother Nature", which went to number 27 on the US soul chart; both songs appeared on their All Directions album.
- In 1974, Yvonne Fair went to number 32 on the US soul chart, and was included on her The Bitch is Black album.
- In 1977, Patti LaBelle included it on her Patti LaBelle album.
- Utah Saints released a new version of the song (featuring Edwin Starr) as a single from their second album Two in 2000, which was featured in the video game FIFA 2001. This version went to number 23 on the UK Singles Chart.
