= Greetings (This Is Uncle Sam) =

1961 Motown song

Single by The Valadiers
- B-side: "Take A Chance"
- Released: October 23, 1961
- Recorded: 1961; Hitsville USA (Studio A) (Detroit, Michigan)
- Genre: Soul, R&B
- Length: 2:33
- Label: Miracle (Motown); M6
- Songwriter(s): Robert Bateman; Brian Holland; The Valadiers; P. Bennet; Lawrence Horn; Ronald Dunbar
- Producer(s): "Brianbert" (Brian Holland & Robert Bateman)

The Valadiers singles chronology
"Greetings (This Is Uncle Sam)" (1961)	"Because i Love Her" (1962)

"Greetings (This Is Uncle Sam)"

Single by The Monitors

from the album Greetings! We're The Monitors
- B-side: "Number One In Your Heart"
- Released: February 24, 1966
- Recorded: January 28, 1966; Hitsville USA (Studio A) (Detroit, Michigan)
- Genre: Soul, R&B
- Length: 2:37
- Label: V.I.P. (Motown); V.I.P. 25032
- Songwriter(s): Robert Bateman; Brian Holland; The Valadiers; P. Bennet; Lawrence Horn; Ronald Dunbar
- Producer(s): Mickey Stevenson; Henry Cosby

The Monitors singles chronology
"Say You" (1965)	"Greetings (This Is Uncle Sam)" (1966)	"Since I Lost You Girl" (1966)

"Greetings (This Is Uncle Sam)" is a 1961 song recorded by three American R&B music groups, The Valadiers, The Monitors, and The Isley Brothers for the Motown label. It was written by Robert Bateman, Brian Holland, Stuart Avig, Martin Coleman, Art Glasser, Jerry Light, P Bennet, Lawrence Horn and Ronald Dunbar. (Avig, Coleman, Glasser and Light were members of the Valadiers.) The Isley Brothers version was shelved while the Valadiers' and Monitors' versions give both groups their first and only charter on the Billboard Hot 100 charts and became the biggest "hit" for each; both groups could only archive very minor hits due to non-promotion.

The song lead (Valadiers lead singer Avig, Monitors lead Richard Street, and Ronald Isley respectively) tells the listeners about his frustrations of being drafted into the army, and how he doesn't want to leave his family, friends and girl behind. The Valadiers and Monitors version also have a Drill Sergeant near the end (played by Valadiers' Jerry Light and Monitors' Warren Harris respectively) barking orders and telling the lead to get in line and march. This would be the only leads for both Light and Harris in their respective groups, as Avig and Coleman were the leads for the Valadiers and Street was the Monitors' lead singer.

The Valadiers were the first to record the song in late 1961. Their version would only make it to No. 89 on the pop chart, not enough (and too little too late) to save the Miracle label from being shut down and replaced with the Gordy label (to which both the group and the Temptations would be reassigned to). The Isleys were the next to record it on January 22, 1966, and then the Monitors just days later on January 28. The Isley Brothers' version was shelved until 1972, three or four years after they left Motown to restart their T-Neck record label. The Monitor's version would become their biggest "hit" on not only the U.S. Pop charts but on the U.S. Billboard R&B chart. But while it reached No. 21 on the U.S. R&B charts (their second and last single on that chart), it only peaked at No. 100 on the U.S. Hot 100 (the first of only two to make the U.S. Pop charts - their last was on the Bubbling Under chart).

== Personnel ==
=== Valadiers' version ===
- Lead vocals by Stuart Avig and Jerry Light
- Backing vocals by Stuart Avig, Marty Coleman, Art Glasser and Jerry Light
- Instrumentation by The Funk Brothers

=== Isley Brothers' version ===
- Lead vocals by Ronald Isley
- Backing vocals by O'Kelly Isley, Jr. and Rudolph Isley
- Instrumentation by The Funk Brothers

=== Monitors' version ===
- Lead vocals by Richard Street and Warren Harris
- Backing vocals by Sandra Fagin, Maurice Fagin, and Warren Harris
- Instrumentation by The Funk Brothers
