= Rowan University =

Public university in Glassboro, New Jersey, US

- Former names: Glassboro Normal School (1923–1937); New Jersey State Teachers College at Glassboro (1937–1958); Glassboro State College (1958–1992); Rowan College of New Jersey (1992–1997)
- Motto: Eruditio spes mundi (Latin)
- Motto in English: "Education, hope of the world"
- Type: Public research university
- Established: September 24, 1923; 103 years ago
- Accreditation: MSCHE
- Academic affiliations: Sea-grant · Space-grant
- Endowment: $487.3 million (2025)
- Chancellor: Anthony Lowman
- President: Ali A. Houshmand
- Faculty: 2,294
- Administrative staff: 2,425
- Students: 22,903
- Undergraduates: 16,199
- Postgraduates: 3,384
- Doctoral students: 1,542
- Location: Glassboro, New Jersey, United States; 39°42′39.30″N 75°07′06.38″W
- Campus: 800 acres (320 ha); Large suburb
- Other campuses: Camden; Stratford
- Newspaper: The Whit
- Colors: Brown and gold
- Nickname: Profs
- Sporting affiliations: NCAA Division III - NJAC
- Mascot: Whoo RU the Prof
- Website: rowan.edu

Rowan University is a public research university in Glassboro, New Jersey, United States. Founded in 1923 as Glassboro Normal School on a 25-acre (10 ha) site donated by 107 residents, the school was known as Glassboro State College from 1958 until 1992 and Rowan College of New Jersey from 1992 to 1997. It also operates a medical campus in Stratford, and medical and academic campuses in Camden.

The university includes 14 colleges and schools with a total enrollment (undergraduate, graduate, and professional studies) of just over 19,600 students. Rowan offers bachelor's, master's, doctoral, and professional degree programs. It is classified among "R2: Doctoral Universities – High research activity".

In 1967, the college was the site of meeting between U.S. president Lyndon B. Johnson and Soviet Premier Alexei Kosygin.

== History ==
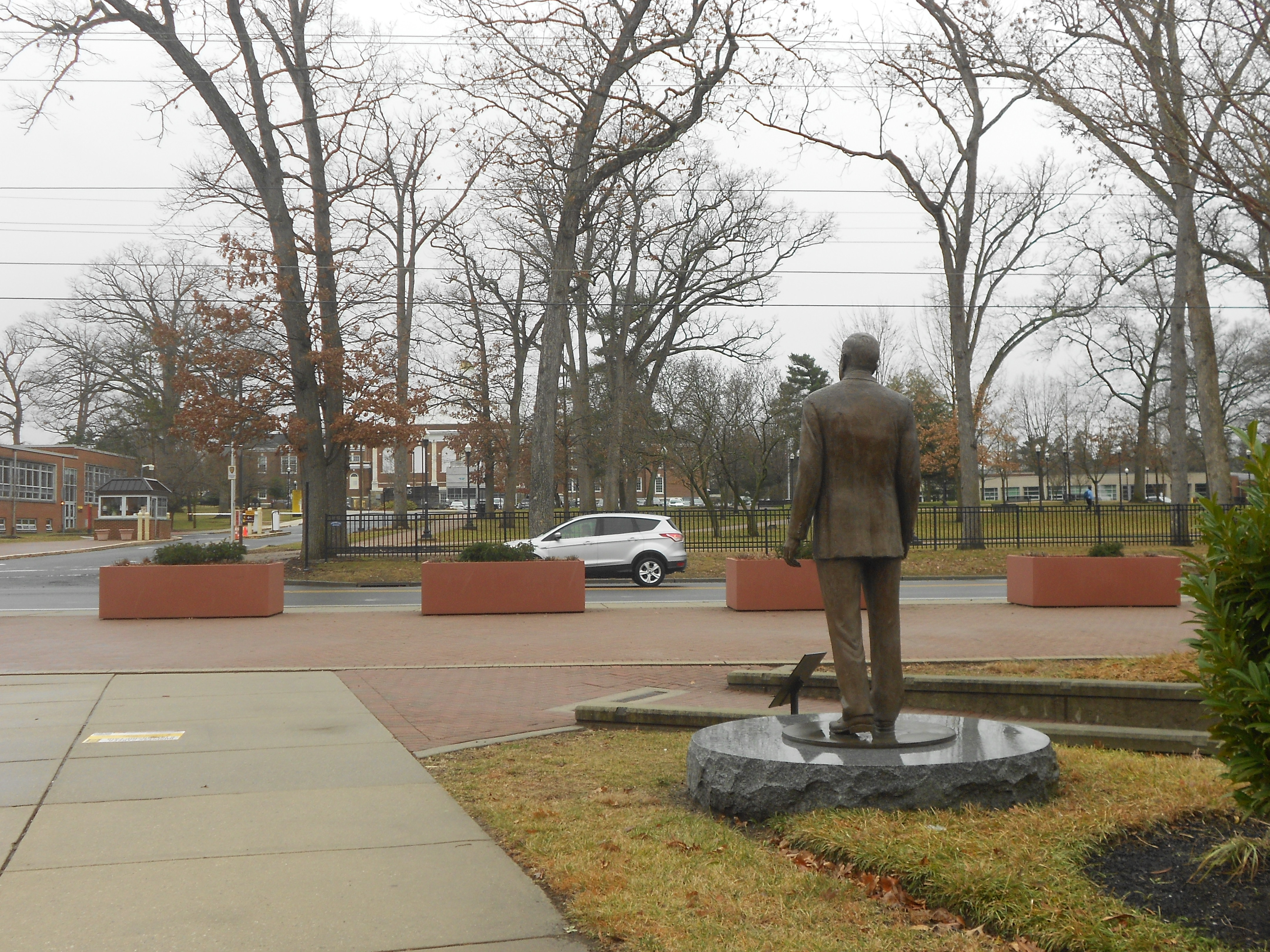
A statue of Henry Rowan in front of Savitz Hall overlooks Route 322

In the early part of the 20th century, there was a shortage of adequately trained teachers in the state of New Jersey. It was decided to build a two-year Normal school in the southern part of the state to counter the trend. Among the candidate towns, Glassboro became the location due in no small part to its easy access to passenger rail as well as its offer to donate 25 acres (0.039 square miles) of land to the state to build the Normal school. The 1917 purchase price of the property was raised by the residents of the town and used to purchase a tract that belonged to the Whitney family, who owned the local glassworks during the 19th century.

In 1923, the Glassboro Normal School opened with a class of 236 students, 226 women and 10 men, arriving at the train station in front of Bunce Hall. With the evolution of teacher training, the school became a four-year program in 1934; in 1937, the school was renamed The New Jersey State Teachers College at Glassboro and became co-educational shortly thereafter.

The college was one of the first in the country to begin programs for teachers for reading disabilities and physical therapy in 1935 and 1944, respectively. Glassboro State began to develop a reputation as a leader in special education. After several years and the return of soldiers from World War II, the college was able to expand its enrollment from a wartime low of 170 in 1943 to an expansion of several additional campus and academic programs over the next 15 years and became Glassboro State College in 1958.

=== Hollybush Summit ===
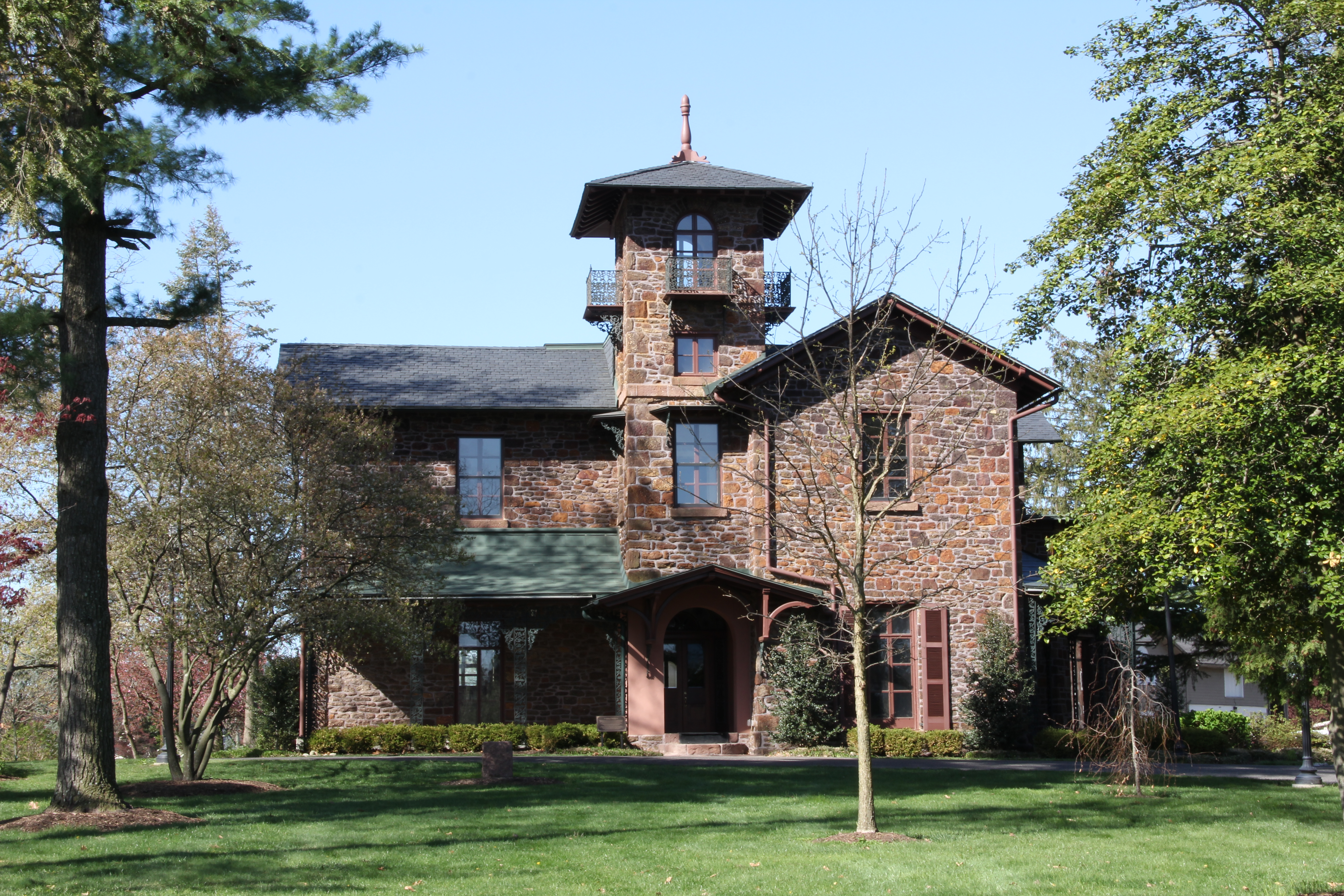
Hollybush Mansion

The Cold War Glassboro Summit Conference between U.S. president Lyndon Johnson and Soviet Premier Alexei Kosygin took place from June 23–25, 1967, in Hollybush Mansion on the campus of then–Glassboro State College. The college was chosen because of its location equidistant between New York City, where Kosygin was making a speech at the U.N., and Washington, D.C.

Then–college president Thomas E. Robinson was given just 16 hours' notice of the decision to hold the summit at GSC and, despite the lack of advance notice, converted his on-campus home into a secure location for the leaders of the world's superpowers.

=== After the summit ===
The campus hosted hard rock band Black Sabbath's first U.S. concert on October 30, 1970. Peaceful student protests occurred during the Vietnam war as they did at other campuses, but never required the college to close the campus.

The college made national news during "Spring Weekend" in 1986, due to a loud party atmosphere primarily off campus around the Beau Rivage townhouses and The Crossings apartment complex in which police from several municipalities were called in to break up the parties. The event led to Glassboro State College's ranking as the #28 Party School in the nation in the January 1987 issue of Playboy magazine.

Though the alcohol-fueled Spring Weekend was canceled by then–president Herman James, an alcohol-free version continued for several years, and Glassboro State College remained known for its hard-partying culture. However, in 1988, there began one of the biggest crackdowns in school history. As a result of the drinking death of freshman James Callahan at Rutgers University in New Brunswick, Herman James decided to make GSC an example for the rest of the state colleges and universities to follow. He invited the New Jersey Alcoholic Beverage Control Commission (ABC) to the school. He began shutting down off-campus parties and placing undercover agents in the local liquor establishments. This prompted controversial "trash TV" personality Morton Downey Jr., who was based in Secaucus, New Jersey, and very popular at the time, to do an untelevised show focusing on the drinking age and the classic argument that an eighteen-year-old can go off to war and die for their country although they cannot legally buy and consume beer.

The following year, the ABC did not return, and the partying atmosphere that the college was known for returned.and continued into the 1990s and early 2000s.

=== University status ===
In 1992, President Herman James oversaw the development of Glassboro State College into what would eventually become Rowan University. This transformation came about because of what was then the largest single gift to a public college or university in history. Industrialist Henry M. Rowan Jr., a graduate of the Massachusetts Institute of Technology class of 1947, and his wife donated $100 million to the college, which later changed its name to Rowan College of New Jersey in his honor. The gift stipulated that the college open a College of Engineering, allowing the college to expand its course and curriculum offerings to the point that it became a full-fledged university, achieving that status in 1997. This status was given by the State of New Jersey based on Rowan University's doctoral degree program, the Ed.D. in Educational Leadership, and the numerous master's-level programs in education and business.

Following James' retirement as president in 1998, Donald J. Farish was chosen to succeed him and began further expansion on the Glassboro campus, opening a modern Science Hall in 2003 and a building to house the College of Education in 2005. In addition, acquisitions during the beginning of Farish's tenure as president led to the development of a tract of land bordering US Route 322 and State Route 55 as the West Campus.

The presidency of Donald Farish was noted for a continued crackdown on the university's partying culture, which declined alongside a rise in SAT scores and class rank among the incoming freshman classes. The crackdown on the partying culture began in earnest in 2002 with the official banning of kegs for use by Greek letter organizations. In 2006, two Rowan University students were found guilty for serving alcohol to minors at an off-campus party that resulted in the death of a 16-year-old male. Rowan promised to follow up with its own penalties.

==== West Campus ====
On March 20, 2006, Farish announced a joint venture between the university and Major League Soccer (MLS) to construct a new athletic complex based around a 20,000-seat soccer-specific stadium on property owned by the campus at the intersection of U.S. Route 322 and Route 55. Although the stadium was planned to be complete for the start of the 2009 MLS season, New Jersey's 2006 budget problems resulted in cutbacks in funding for the infrastructure upgrades required by increased traffic related to an MLS team. When the plan fell through, the stadium project was relocated to nearby Chester, Pennsylvania where the MLS's Philadelphia Union now play their home matches.

The northern portion of the West Campus expansion currently contains the South Jersey Technology Park as well as room for future expansion; the southern portion of the West Campus expansion will accommodate both academic and athletic facilities. The university in 2015 opened a 17.5-acre (7.1 ha) site across from the South Jersey Technology Park at Rowan University with practice fields for football, soccer, field hockey, and lacrosse. Transportation between the two campuses will be provided with both shuttle service and improved bike paths, as well as improvements to Route 322 itself.

On a large site adjacent to the West Campus athletic fields, the Inspira Medical Center complex opened in late 2019.

==== South Jersey Technology Park ====
Rowan University broke ground for the South Jersey Technology Park (SJTP) on April 10, 2006. The New Jersey Economic Development Authority (NJEDA) gave Rowan University $5.8 million to combine with $1.5 million from the New Jersey Commission on Science and Technology, $1 million from Samuel H. Jones, and $1 million from Rowan itself. SJTP is planned to be a 188 acres (76 ha) site which will serve as an establishment for science and technology companies as well as academics. It is planned to have 25 buildings to provide competitively priced Class "A" facilities for budding entrepreneurs, start-up and established companies. SJTP was incorporated as a non-profit corporation with its own board of directors. The first building, the Samuel H. Jones Innovation Center, has been leased completely out, and the revenue will help build a second building.

The Tech Park's first incubated business, SocialReach, has successfully graduated into its own offices in Philadelphia.

The second planned building will be approximately 66,000 square feet (6,100 m^{2}) divided between research and technology labs and offices.

==== Campus crimes ====
In December 1972, Stephen Setrin was stabbed while on the grounds of Glassboro State College

On August 12, 1996, 22-year-old Cindy Nannay was fatally shot outside Bozorth Hall by her estranged boyfriend, who then killed himself. Nannay was so afraid of Scott Lonabaugh, 27, that when he arrived on the campus to see her, she asked friends to accompany her to the parking lot, the Gloucester County Prosecutor's office said. As her friends looked on, Mr. Lonabaugh shot Ms. Nannay twice with a shotgun and then shot himself in the head, prosecutors said. Both died at the scene.

Eleven years later, in 2007, another student was murdered on campus. Sophomore Donald Farrell, 19, was robbed and beaten to death by unknown assailants while walking behind the Triad dormitory. A reward of $100,000 has been offered for information leading to the capture, arrest and conviction of the assailants. In an effort to find Farrell's assailants, television stations in Philadelphia, New Jersey and New York City aired reports on the murder, and America's Most Wanted twice featured segments on the incident.

Following Farrell's murder a new campus security initiative was undertaken, starting with a 14-point plan proposed by President Farish. The plan included hiring additional security staff, adding more fully trained police officers, starting a student patrol program, an expansion of the Safe Walk and Ride program, improving lighting in and around campus, installation of CCTV cameras, and changing security and police coverage from an 8-hour to a 12-hour shift.

=== Cooper Medical School ===
It was announced on June 26, 2009, that Rowan would be partnering with Cooper University Hospital to create a new four-year medical school to reside on Broadway in Camden. Rowan was chosen by governor Jon Corzine to house the new medical school primarily because the University of Medicine and Dentistry of New Jersey (UMDNJ) was not in a financial position to fund the creation of the school, for which Rowan issued $100 million in bonds.

The new school would require no new funding as $28 million would be diverted from UMDNJ Robert Wood Johnson Medical School, which will no longer be associated with Cooper University Hospital after the opening of Cooper Medical School. Opening in 2012 with an entering class of 50, Cooper Medical School of Rowan University was the only medical school in the state not affiliated with UMDNJ before their closing. It was the first new medical school in New Jersey in at least 30 years.

The Cooper Medical School of Rowan University was granted preliminary accreditation by the Liaison Committee on Medical Education on June 10, 2011.

=== Medical and Health Sciences Education Restructuring Act ===
In January 2012, a state advisory committee proposed a plan to merge Rowan with the Camden campus of Rutgers University (which would have been separated from Rutgers) under Rowan's name. The project was opposed by the Rutgers governing boards, faculty, students, and alumni, and by others in the state. Legislation passed in June 2012 rejected the idea of a merger, though it did include provisions for a loose collaboration between Rowan and Rutgers-Camden limited to research and teaching in the health sciences. This legislation, the "New Jersey Medical and Health Sciences Education Restructuring Act" (A3102 & S2063), enacted several essential changes to Rowan:

- Rowan University was granted Research University status and was granted increased state funding.
- Rowan University acquired the University of Medicine and Dentistry's (UMDNJ) Stratford-based School of Osteopathic Medicine. Rowan joined Michigan State University as the only institutions in the country to operate both a DO and an MD medical school. The acquisition also included the Graduate School of Biomedical Sciences (GSBS).
- A joint Rowan/Rutgers-Camden governing board was created to oversee the development and operation of collaborative programs in the health sciences.

=== Student deaths and mental health support ===
The university faced criticism for not providing more mental health resources and support for students after four students committed suicide between 2019 and 2021. Following the student deaths in 2019, the university expanded its resources better accommodate students' mental health, including bringing the number of counselors employed to 17 and partnering with TogetherAll, a 24/7 mental health support network. Additionally, the university received a $3 million grant in 2019 to start The Shreiber Family Pet Therapy Program after their success with bringing in local therapy dogs to help students with anxiety and stress.

=== Edelman Fossil Park & Museum ===
Rowan owns and operates the Edelman Fossil Park in Mantua Township, a 65-acre (26 ha) former marl quarry preserving a 66-million-year-old fossil bonebed laid down at the end of the Cretaceous Period. In October 2021, the university broke ground at the site on the $73 million Jean and Ric Edelman Fossil Park & Museum, named for donors Jean and Ric Edelman and led by its founding executive director, paleontologist Kenneth Lacovara. The 44,000-square-foot (4,100 m^{2}) museum opened on March 29, 2025, as New Jersey's largest public net-zero facility, and was projected to attract 200,000 visitors per year.

== Academics ==
The university is currently divided into the following colleges and schools:

- College of the Arts
- Rohrer College of Business
- Ric Edelman College of Communication, Humanities & Social Sciences
- College of Education
- Henry M. Rowan College of Engineering
- John H. Martinson Honors College
- College of Science and Mathematics
- School of Earth and Environment
- Global Learning and Partnerships
- School of Innovation and Entrepreneurship
- Cooper Medical School of Rowan University
- Virtua Health College of Medical and Life Sciences
  - Rita & Larry Salva School of Nursing & Health Professions
  - Rowan-Virtua School of Osteopathic Medicine
  - Rowan-Virtua School of Translational Biomedical Engineering & Sciences
- Shreiber School of Veterinary Medicine

=== Admissions and enrollment ===
Enrollment at Rowan from the fall semester of 2017 shows 15,401 undergraduates and 2,045 graduate students from 38 states and 34 countries. The overall admission rate is 53.0%. Undergraduates submitting statistics for a data set in 2017 had scores of 530 at the 25th percentile and 630 at the 75th percentile in SAT critical reading and 510 at the 25th percentile and 620 at the 75th percentile for SAT Math. As of the fall of 2016, the average accepted GPA was 3.46.

=== Rankings ===
Academic rankings

National
- Forbes: 361
- U.S. News & World Report: 163
- Washington Monthly: 163
- WSJ/College Pulse: 355

Global
- QS: 801–1000
- U.S. News & World Report: 1807

National Program Rankings
Program	Ranking (2024)
Business	244
Computer Science	229
Nursing	535
Economics	268

In its 2024 college rankings, U.S. News and World Report ranked Rowan University:

- National Universities: 163
- Top Public Schools: 88
- Best Value Schools: 104
- Best Undergraduate Engineering Programs (at schools whose highest degree is a doctorate): 105
- Psychology Programs: 316
- Best Colleges for Veterans: 113
- Top Performers on Social Mobility: 91

== Athletics ==
Rowan's athletics logo

Rowan University has 18 sports teams (8 men's and 10 women's). The football, field hockey, and track & field teams compete at John Page Memorial Field at Coach Richard Wackar Stadium. The basketball, volleyball, and swimming & diving teams call Esbjornson Gymnasium home. Women's lacrosse and the men's and women's soccer teams play at the Rowan Soccer and Lacrosse Complex. The baseball and softball teams have their own, dedicated facilities on campus. Rowan's teams are known as the Profs (short for Professors, a nod to the university's 1923 opening as a school to train educators), and the mascot is named Whoo RU.

Rowan also has club teams for: archery, ballroom dance, baseball, men's and women's basketball, cheerleading, crew, cycling, dance, equestrian, esports, fencing, field hockey, fishing, golf, men's and women's ice hockey, karate, men's and women's lacrosse, mixed martial arts (MMA), outdoors, paintball, powerlifting, quidditch, racquetball, rock climbing, roller hockey, men's and women's rugby, skateboarding, skiing and snowboarding, men's and women's soccer, softball, street hockey, swimming, table tennis, tennis, ultimate Frisbee, men's and women's volleyball, and wrestling.

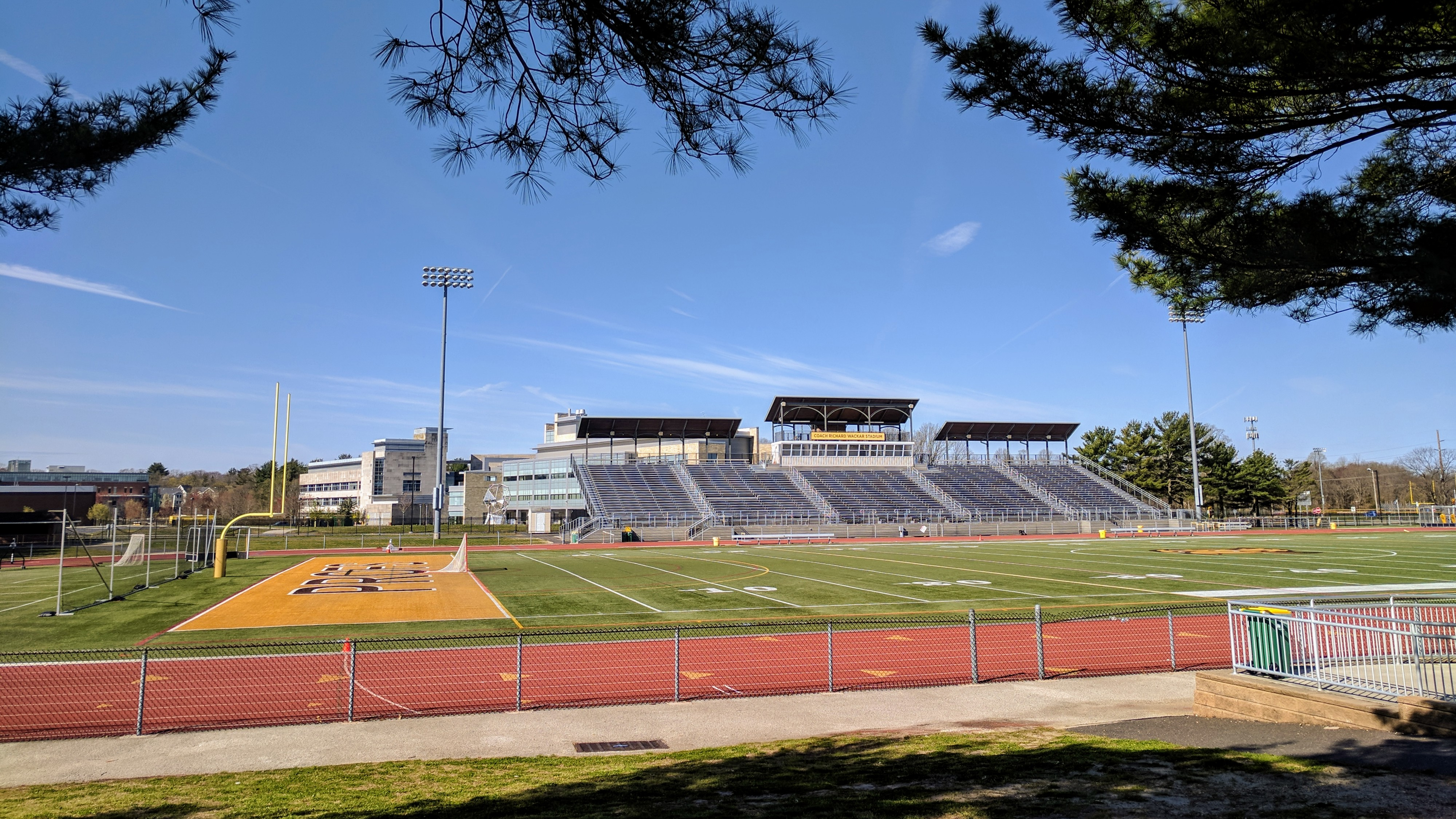
The field of Rowan University's Coach Richard Wackar Stadium

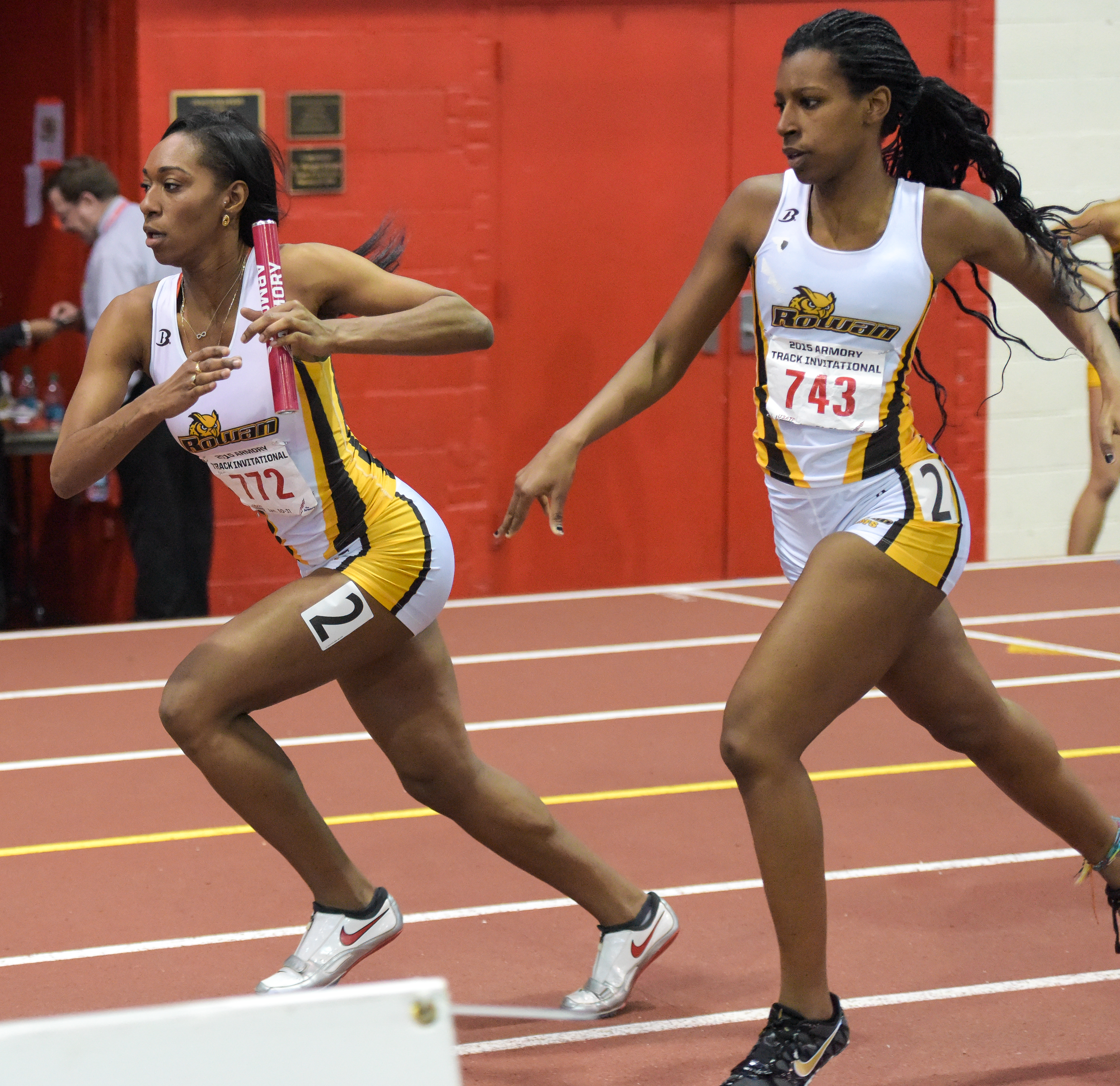
A Rowan Profs relay team at The Armory in 2015

A member of the NCAA in Division III, competing in the New Jersey Athletic Conference (NJAC), the sports teams at Rowan University have had some success on a national level. The Profs football team is regularly a contender for the national title, having gone to the Amos Alonzo Stagg Bowl five times (1999, 1998, 1996, 1995, 1993) and the national semifinals in 1992, 1997, 2001, 2004 and 2005.

The women's field hockey team won the national championship in 2002 and had a perfect season of 21 wins and no losses. The men's basketball team has made the NCAA Division III National Championship Tournament 12 times, winning the national title in 1996. The men's soccer team has made the NCAA Division III National Championship Tournament 24 times, resulting in seven trips to the national semifinals. Rowan men's soccer has won national titles in both 1981 and 1990, finished second in 1979 and 2000, and third in 1980, 1985, and 1998. The baseball team has won the NCAA Division III National Championship in 1978 and 1979, while making appearances in the NCAA Division III World Series in 2004, 2005, 2021, 2025, and 2026. Rowan hosted the Division III National Championship Tournament Final Four for men's soccer in 2000, women's lacrosse in 2002, and field hockey in 2022.

== Student life ==
Undergraduate demographics as of Fall 2023
Race and ethnicity	Total
White	62%
Hispanic	14%
Black	11%
Asian	6%
Two or more races	4%
International student	2%
Unknown	1%
Economic diversity
Low-income (Note: The percentage of students who received an income-based federal Pell grant intended for low-income students.)	32%
Affluent (Note: The percentage of students who are a part of the American middle class at the bare minimum.)	68%

=== Student Center ===
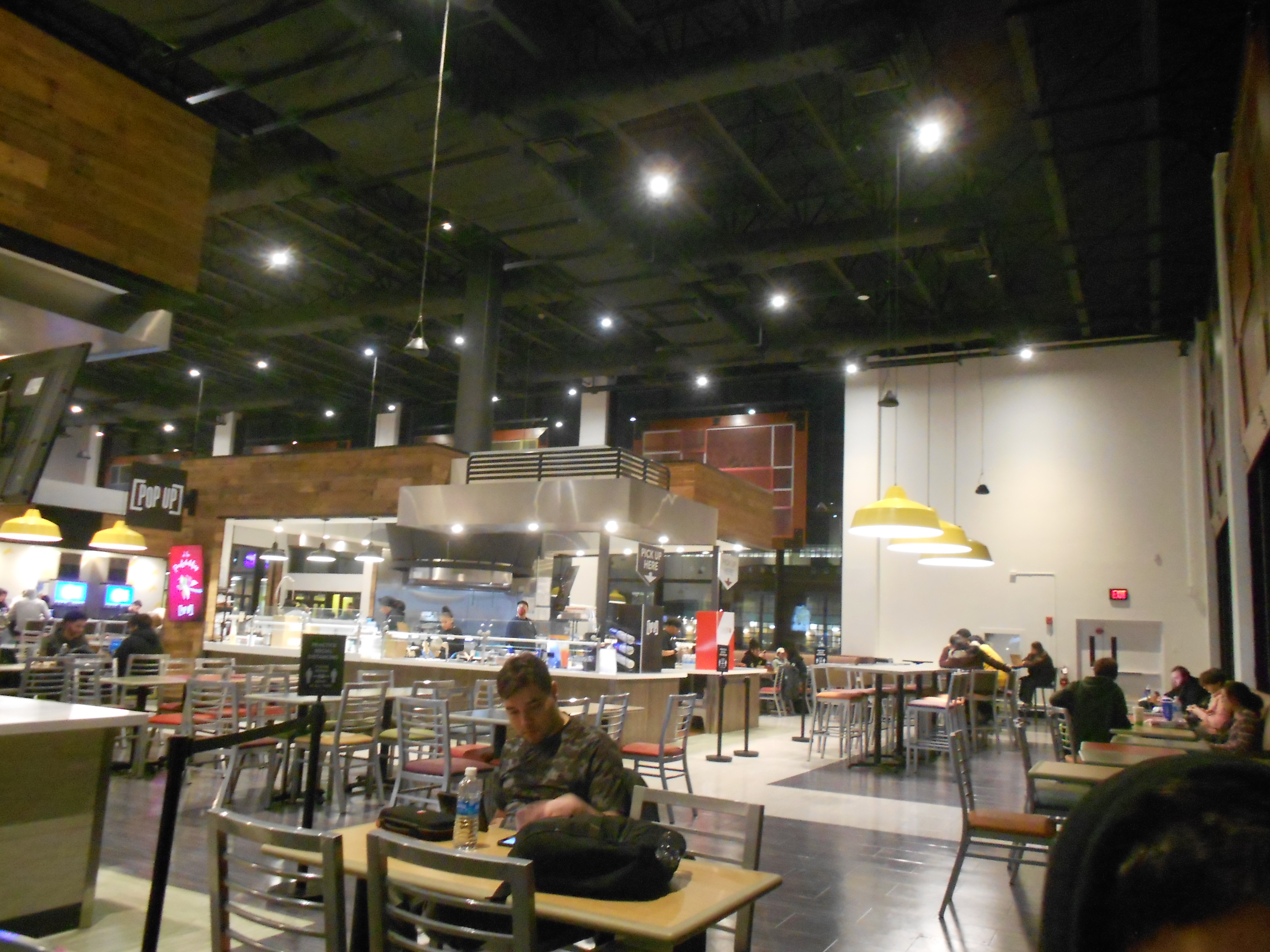
The Chamberlain Student Center cafeteria

The Chamberlain Student Center is the main location for dining on campus. Dining options include the Owl's Nest restaurant, Saxby's, Grill Nation, Jersey Mike's Subs, Freshens, Sono, Crust, Chef Jet, Smoked, Breakfast & Co., Bowl Life, Pop Up, and the Marketplace convenience store. The Student Center is also home to the Student Government Association, Conference and Event Services, the Greek Affairs Office, Student Activities, the Mailroom, and the Information Desk.

=== Media ===
Rowan University hosts the award-winning Rowan Radio 89.7 WGLS-FM, which began in 1964 on a $6,000 budget (equivalent to $62,285 in 2025). Additionally, the Rowan Television Network (RTN) is a student-run closed-circuit television station that provides 24-hour content to the students of Rowan University. RTN currently consists of 11 student-produced television shows, various sports related programming, and coverage of topical events occurring on campus.

The Whit has served as the campus newspaper since 1938, covering school news, student life, Rowan sports, and entertainment. It is published weekly throughout the school year except during exams. Another mainstay campus publication is Avant, a student-led literary magazine that compiles undergraduate poetry, short stories, photos, and artwork in annual fall and spring issues. Image is the annual Rowan yearbook. Other campus publications include Halftone, an online magazine focusing on entertainment and pop culture, and At My Whit's End, a zine published by the Writing Arts Club. Venue was a long-running alternative, uncensored student publication focusing on campus opinions and humor, initially formed in 1968 with a heavy political focus. Changing its format over the years, Venue printed four issues a year up to 2011.

=== Rowan Boulevard ===
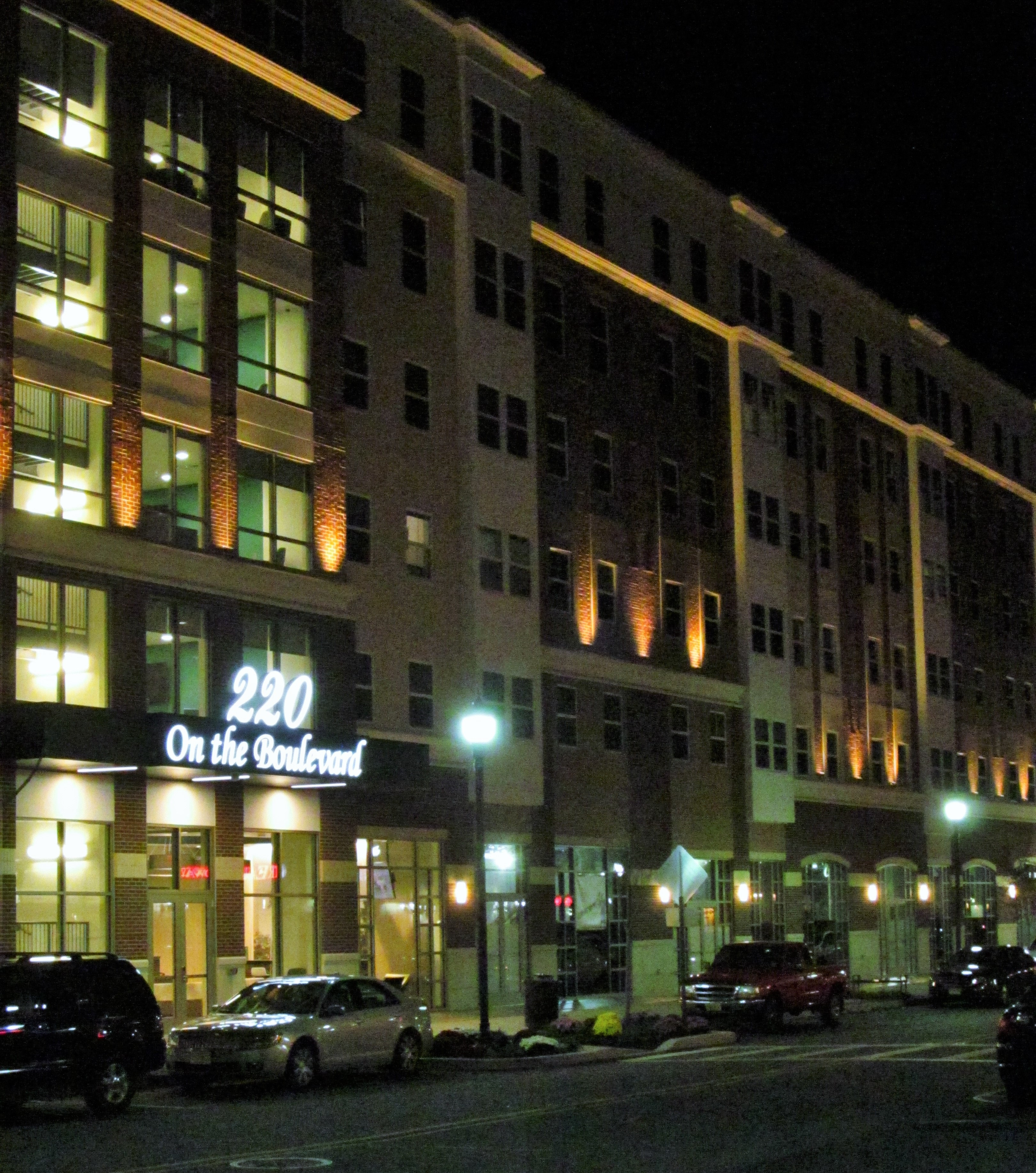
220 Rowan Blvd at night

Rowan Boulevard connects Route 322 to downtown Glassboro, forming a bustling urban area that fuses businesses, bookstores, restaurants, a primary care facility, academic buildings, and student housing.

=== Housing ===
Rowan provides housing for over 6,500 students in 13 University owned housing complexes and 5 affiliated housing units. Students have a choice between halls, apartments, or townhouses. Full-time, non-commuter students are required to live in on-campus until the completion of their sophomore year, and are thus guaranteed on-campus housing during this time. After this, students must enter into a housing lottery.

With the university's continued growth, housing at Rowan's main Glassboro campus has reached capacity. The university has moved to construct new housing aggressively.

The student-run Residence Hall Association represents students who live on-campus.

There are seven freshman residence halls and five for upperclassmen. Starting in the fall of 2017, Rowan University offered apartment-style housing options in a public-private partnership with Nexus Properties.

=== Student organizations ===
There are more than 100 clubs and organizations at Rowan University, along with more than 30 Greek organizations.

Other chartered clubs report to the Student Government Association including the Rowan Television Network, the local PRSSA, the Rowan College Republicans, the Rowan Democratic Club, and The Student University Programmers (SUP). Cinema Workshop, the university's student film club, celebrated its 30th anniversary in 2007.

== Transportation ==
New Jersey Transit bus routes 313 and 412 serve the university. U.S. Route 322 (Mullica Hill Road) bisects the campus. It is a planned stop on the Glassboro–Camden Line, a proposed 18-mile (28.97 km) diesel multiple unit (DMU) light rail system.

== Gallery ==
Rowan University buildings

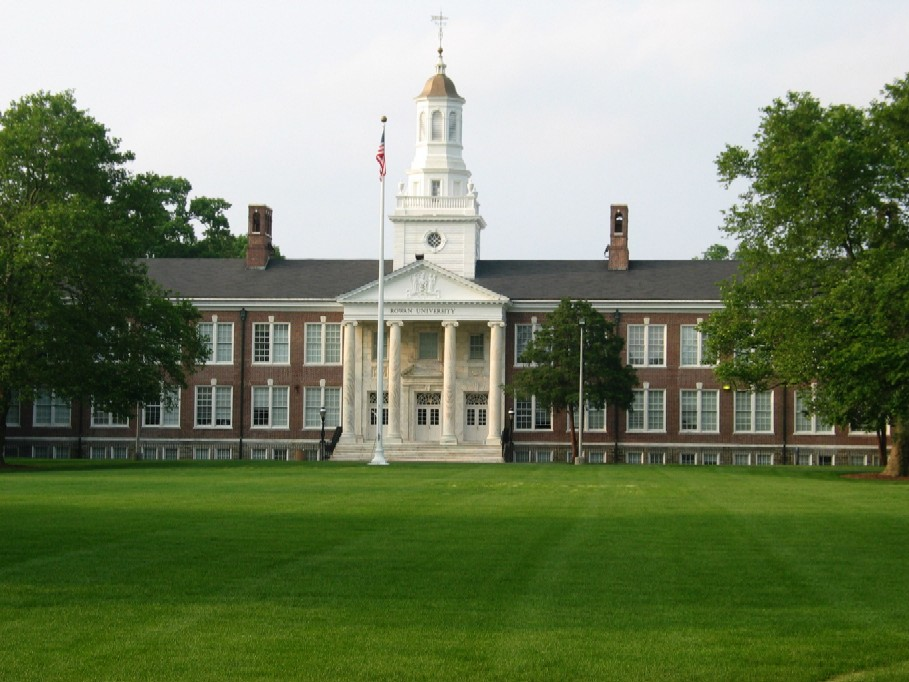
Bunce Hall, built in 1923, is the school's original academic building

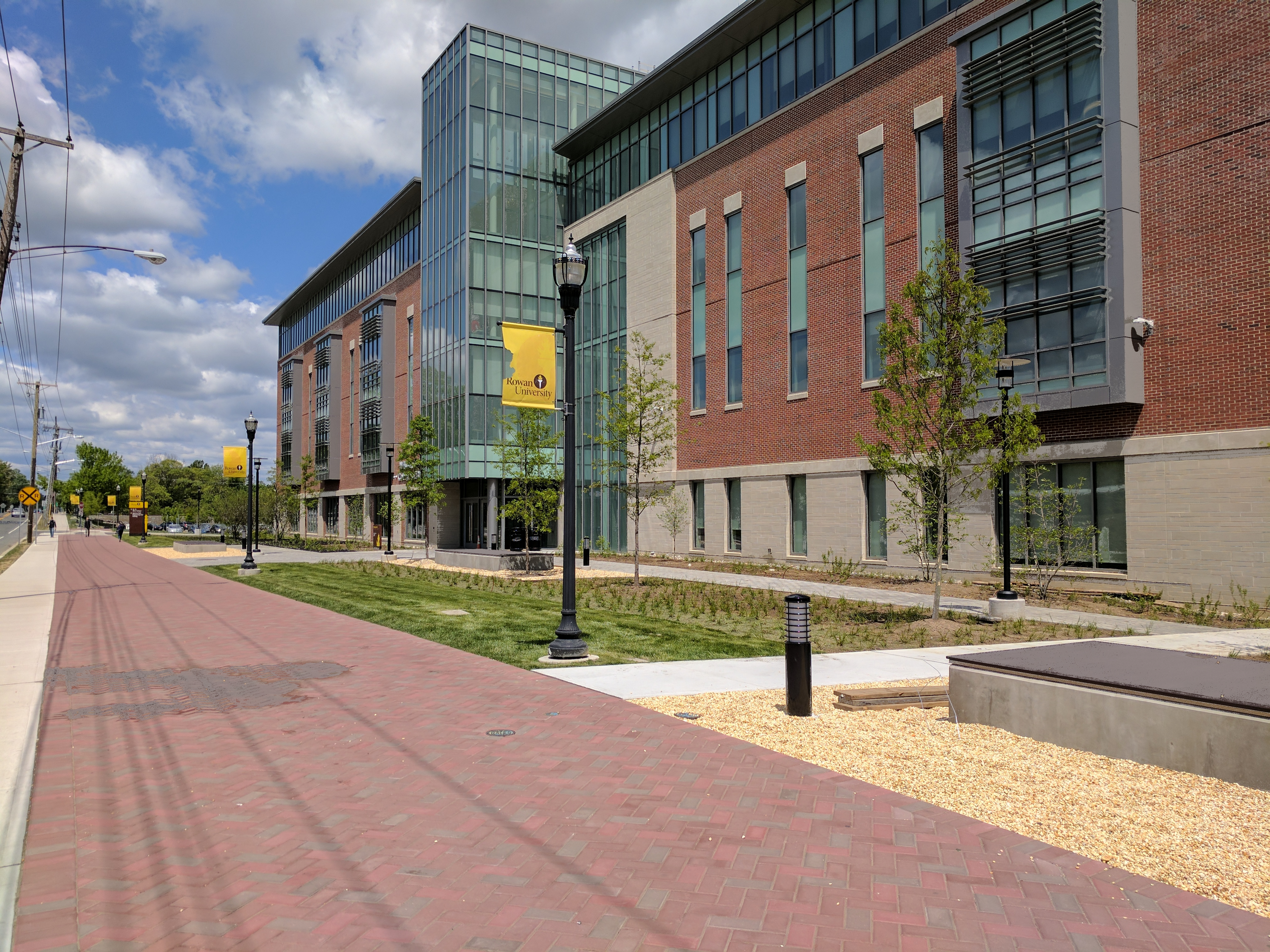
Business Hall, home of the Rohrer College of Business

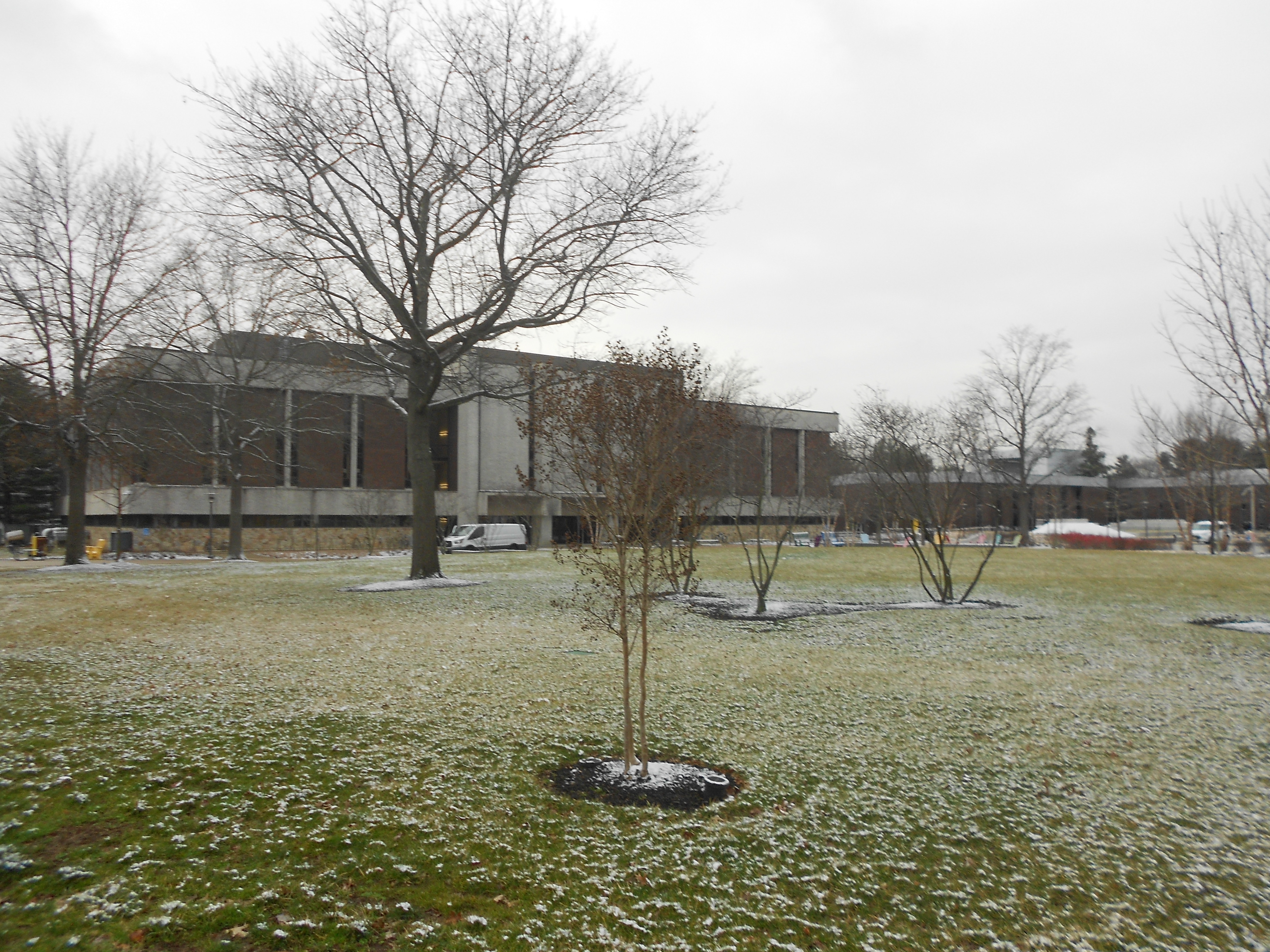
Robinson Hall

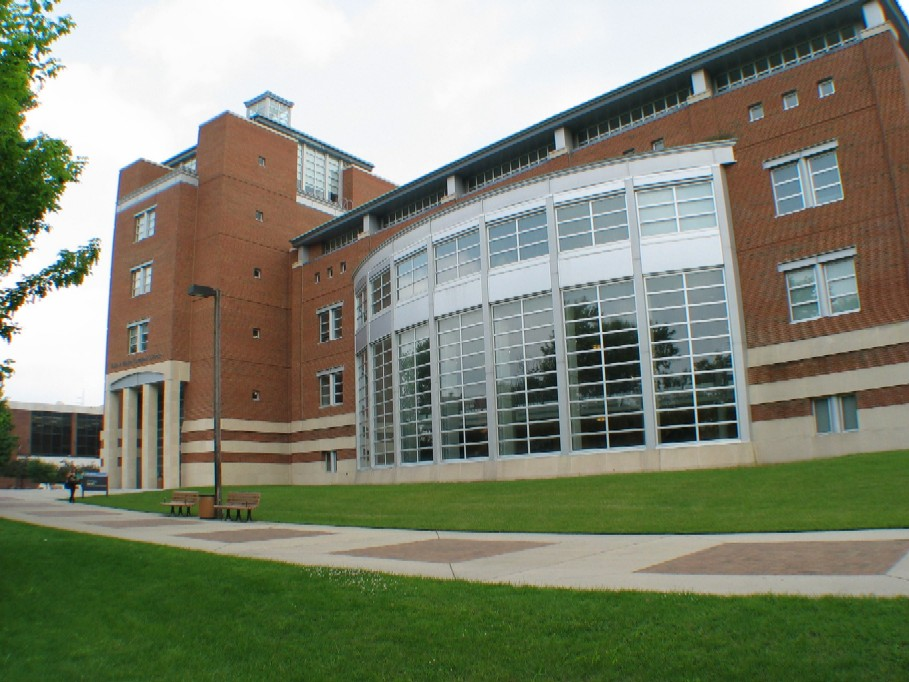
Campbell Library

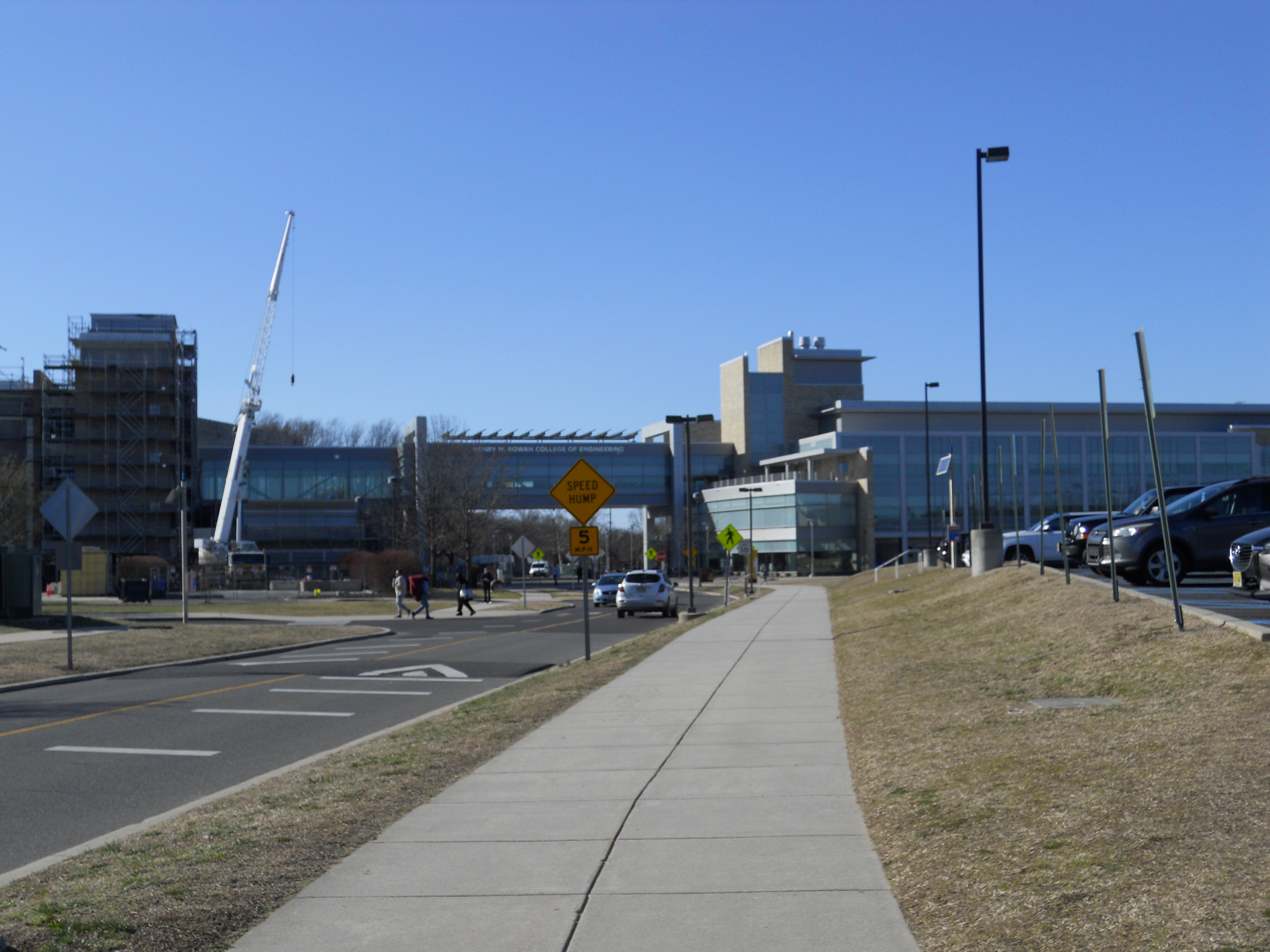
The Engineering Hall

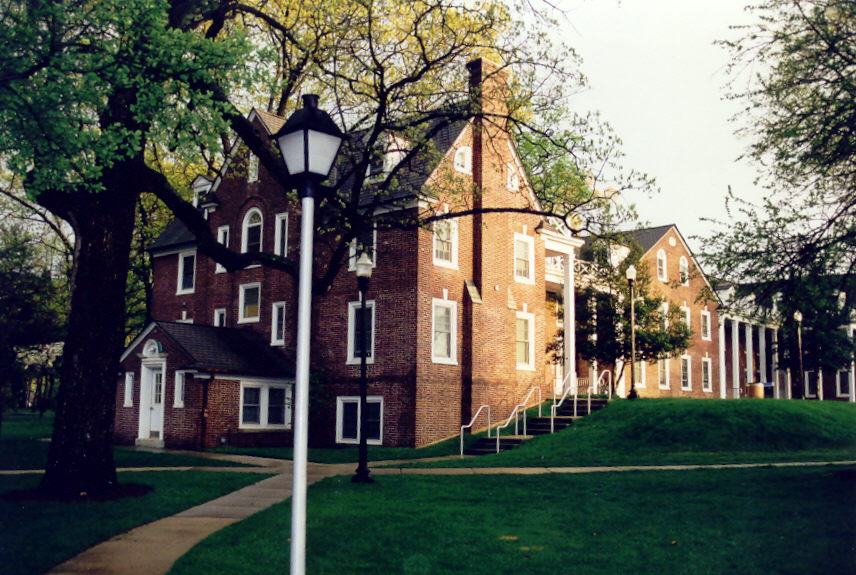
Oak Hall

== Notable alumni ==
- Don Amendolia (born 1944), actor
- Dan Baker (born 1946), Philadelphia Phillies PA announcer and former Philadelphia Eagles PA announcer
- Jessica Boyington, Miss New Jersey USA 2006
- Kyle Cassidy (born 1966), photographer and videographer
- Betty Castor (born 1941), Florida politician and former president of the University of South Florida
- Adam Chazen (born 1986), Associate Visual Effects Producer for Game of Thrones
- Jack Collins (born 1943), college basketball coach and former Speaker of the New Jersey General Assembly
- Nick Comoroto (born 1991), professional wrestler
- Jim Cook Jr. (born 1987), journalist and playwright.
- Scott DePace, TV director, The Howard Stern Show
- Steve Dildarian (born 1969), creator of the HBO animated series The Life & Times of Tim.
- Lince Dorado (born 1987), professional wrestler
- Ric Edelman, financial planner and radio host
- Evan Edinger (born 1990), American-born YouTuber based in London, England
- Stink Fisher (born 1970), football player and actor in movies such as Invincible and The Longest Yard
- Jamie Ginn (born 1982), Miss Delaware 2006
- Dino Hall (born 1955), running back who played in the NFL for the Cleveland Browns
- Robert Hegyes (1951–2012), actor and former co-star of Welcome Back, Kotter known for his role as Juan Epstein, who was a professor at his alma mater in the early to mid-1990s
- Allen Helbig (born 1964), artist, animator, photographer, body painter, and web designer
- Kenneth Lacovara, explorer and paleontologist, known for discovering new species of dinosaurs (2004 Rowan Alumnus of the Year)
- Trymaine Lee, Pulitzer Prize–winning reporter
- Fred H. Madden (born 1954), New Jersey State Senator and former superintendent of the New Jersey State Police
- Max Manning (1918-2003), Pitcher who played for the Newark Eagles
- Marilyn Marshall (1941–2015), R&B and jazz recording artist
- Tim Marshall, radio host, R&B Music Hall of Fame 2013 Inaugural Inductee
- Soraida Martinez (born 1956), artist, designer and social activist known for creating the art style of Verdadism
- Mary Previte (1932–2019), author of Hungry Ghosts, served in the New Jersey General Assembly representing the 6th Legislative District from 1998 to 2006
- Megan Rochell, R&B singer, dropped out before graduating
- John Sadak, Television play-by-play announcer for the Cincinnati Reds
- Patti Smith (born 1946), musician, singer and poet, member of the Rock and Roll Hall of Fame
- Shaun T (born 1978), motivational speaker, fitness trainer and choreographer best known for his home fitness programs T25, Insanity and Hip-Hop Abs
- James L. Usry (1922–2002), first African American mayor of Atlantic City, New Jersey
- Justin Hinds, defensive line coach for the Seattle Seahawks

== Notable faculty ==
- David Bianculli, television critic who teaches television and film history
- Marvin Creamer, geography professor and first person to circumnavigate the globe without any navigational instruments
- Neil Hartman, sports personality; director of Rowan's Center for Sports Communication and Social Impact. Known for sparking Allen Iverson's "practice" rant in 2002
- Melissa Klapper, historian and storyteller
- Gordon Turk (born 1949), virtuoso organist; faculty member since 2013

== See also ==
- Cooper Medical School of Rowan University
- Rowan-Virtua School of Osteopathic Medicine
- Rowan College at Burlington County
- Rowan College of South Jersey (with campuses in Cumberland and Gloucester counties)
- List of colleges and universities in New Jersey
