= The Temptations in Japan =

Live album by The Temptations
- Released: 1974 (Japan only); October 31, 2004 (5000 copy limited reissue)
- Recorded: December 13, 1973
- Venues: Shibuya-Kokaido, Tokyo
- Genres: Soul, pop
- Label: Motown/Hip-O Select
- Producer: Kaname Tajima

The Temptations chronology
Masterpiece (1973)	The Temptations in Japan (1974)	1990 (1973)

Professional ratings
Review scores
Source	Rating
AllMusic	4/5 stars

The Temptations in Japan is a 1974 live album recorded by The Temptations in Japan, where it was initially issued exclusively. The album was released in select countries, including The Netherlands and Germany, in 1975. The album was later remastered and re-released on compact disc in 2004, where a limited edition 5000 copy run was made for sale in the US and other countries.

== Background ==
This album was significant in that it brought out the maturation and growth of members Damon Harris and Richard Street as worthy replacements for original members Eddie Kendricks and Paul Williams. Highlights include a phenomenal arrangement of "The First Time Ever I Saw Your Face", "Masterpiece", "Love Woke Me Up This Morning", "Just My Imagination", "Hey Girl (I Like Your Style)" and "Papa Was a Rolling Stone", for years the only track to be available for release in the United States. This is one of the group's better live albums. Other notable entries include 1967's The Temptations Live featuring the classic lineup and 1970's Live at London's Talk of The Town, which featured Dennis Edwards and Eddie Kendricks in its lineup.

== Track listing ==
All tracks produced by Kaname Tajima.

Side one
No.	Title	Writer(s)	Lead singer(s)	Length
1.	"Plastic Man"	Norman Whitfield, Barrett Strong	Dennis Edwards, Damon Harris, Melvin Franklin, Richard Street	3:00
2.	"I Can't Get Next To You"	Whitfield, Strong	Edwards, Harris, Franklin, Street, Otis Williams	1:54
3.	"Love Woke Me Up This Morning"	Nicholas Ashford, Valerie Simpson	Harris	4:01
4.	"Medley: Get Ready / My Girl / The Way You Do the Things You Do"	Smokey Robinson, Ronnie White, Bobby Rogers	Harris, Street	3:59
5.	"The First Time Ever (I Saw Your Face)"	Ewan MacColl	Street	6:15
6.	"Hey Girl (I Like Your Style)"	Whitfield	Street (introduction: Franklin)	4:03

Side two
No.	Title	Writer(s)	Lead singer(s)	Length
1.	"Cloud Nine"	Whitfield, Strong	Edwards, Street, Harris	2:05
2.	"Introduction Of The Group And Band"		introduction: Franklin	3:30
3.	"A Song For You"	Leon Russell	Edwards	5:20
4.	"Masterpiece"	Whitfield	Harris, Williams, Street, Edwards	2:31
5.	"Just My Imagination (Running Away With Me)"	Whitfield, Strong	Harris	4:04
6.	"Papa Was A Rollin' Stone"	Whitfield, Strong	Edwards, Street, Harris	7:44

== Personnel ==
- Dennis Edwards-Tenor/Baritone
- Richard Street-Tenor/Baritone
- Damon Harris-First Tenor/Falsetto
- Melvin Franklin-Bass
- Otis Williams-Second Tenor/Baritone

with:

- Aaron Smith - drums
- Cornelius Grant - guitar
