= Tim Marshall =

Tim Marshall may refer to:

- Tim Marshall (journalist) (born 1959), British journalist, writer and broadcaster
- Tim Marshall (radio host), South Jersey radio personality
- Timothy P. Marshall (born 1956), American engineer and meteorologist
