= Say You =

Say You may refer to:

- Say You (Ronnie Dove song)
- Say You (Motown song)
