= Marilyn Marshall =

Marilyn Marshall may refer to:

- Marilyn Marshall (singer)
- Marilyn Marshall (footballer)
