= Masterpiece (The Temptations song) =

- French release picture sleeve

Single by the Temptations

from the album Masterpiece
- B-side: "Masterpiece (instrumental)"
- Released: February 1973
- Genre: Psychedelic soul; progressive pop
- Length: 4:22 (single version); 13:49 (album version)
- Label: Motown Records
- Songwriter: Norman Whitfield
- Producer: Norman Whitfield

The Temptations singles chronology
"Papa Was a Rollin' Stone" (1972)	"Masterpiece" (1973)	"Plastic Man" (1973)

"Masterpiece" is a 1973 soul single written by Norman Whitfield and performed by American vocal group the Temptations.

== Background ==
Whitfield, who also produced the track, entitled it "Masterpiece" because he felt it was a perfect blending of strings, horns, rhythm players, voices, studio tricks, and sweetening elements. However, the word 'masterpiece' does not appear in the song's lyrics, which do not point to anything obvious from which to draw a title. As with their Whitfield-produced hit from the previous year, "Papa Was a Rollin' Stone", the Temptations do not make their first appearance until after a long instrumental section. This added to already building tension between the group and Whitfield and led some music writers to start referring to the Temps as "the Norman Whitfield Choral Singers".

== Personnel ==
- Lead and background vocals by Dennis Edwards, Richard Street, Damon Harris, Melvin Franklin (song verses), and Otis Williams (spoken introduction)
- Instrumentation by the Funk Brothers

== Chart history ==
Released from the album of the same title, the title track reached number seven on the Billboard Hot 100 singles chart and spent two weeks at number one on the Hot Soul Singles chart. It was their last Top Ten pop hit with Motown Records, and perhaps the last such hit in their career, not counting "The Motown Song," their collaboration with Rod Stewart in 1991.

== Chart positions ==
Charts	Peak position
U.S. Billboard Hot 100	7
U.S. Billboard Best Selling Soul Singles	1
