= The Monitors (American group) =

American vocal group

- The Monitors, circa 1966. Left to right: John "Maurice" Fagin, Warren Harris, Sandra Fagin, and Richard Street.

Background information
- Origin: Detroit, Michigan, U.S.
- Genres: R&B, soul, pop
- Years active: 1964–1971, 1980s
- Labels: Thelma, Motown, Motorcity
- Past members: Richard Street; Warren Harris; Sandra Fagin; John "Maurice" Fagin; Darrell Littlejohn; Herschel Hunter; Leah Harris

The Monitors were an American vocal group who recorded for Motown Records in the 1960s. The group, which consisted of lead singer Richard Street, Sandra Fagin, John "Maurice" Fagin, and Warren Harris, had two minor hits, "Say You" (#36 R&B), and then a cover of the Valadiers' "Greetings (This is Uncle Sam)", which reached #21 on the Billboard R&B chart, and #100 on the Billboard Pop singles chart.

== Career ==
Harris and Street were school friends of Otis Williams and Melvin Franklin. Street became a member of the Distants with Williams and Franklin, but left before the group merged with the Primes to become The Temptations. Street recorded on Thelma Records, as Richard Street & the Distants, releasing the unsuccessful single "Answer Me", produced by Norman Whitfield, and also worked as a songwriter and as a member of another group, the Peps. Street and Harris then formed a group together with Sandra and John Fagin.

Their first release, as the Majestics, was to have been "Hello Love" on Motown's V.I.P. label in 1964, but release was cancelled. A year later, "Say You" was released initially as The Majestics, but a name change to The Monitors was made after it was found there was another group already recording as The Majestics for another company. "Say You" reached #36 on the Billboard R&B chart. "Greetings (This is Uncle Sam)" was their third release and reached #100 on Billboard's Pop Chart in 1966. The song explores the feelings felt by many young men, as they were drafted into the army to serve in the Vietnam War. Two more singles appeared on V.I.P., "Since I Lost You Girl" (November 1966) and "Bring Back the Love" (January 1968). They were switched to Motown's Soul label with "Step by Step (Hand in Hand)" in the summer of 1968, but this was to be their final single with Motown. However, they also released an album, Greetings! We're The Monitors, in 1968.

Because of The Monitors' lack of success, its members held other positions within the Motown corporation to sustain income. Richard Street, for example, worked in Motown's Quality Control department, and later traveled with The Temptations as a stand-in for Paul Williams, who became increasingly ill during the late 1960s and early 1970s due to alcoholism and other health problems. When Williams was forced to leave the Temptations in 1971 because of his failing health, Street took his place, and The Monitors were dissolved.

British producer Ian Levine recorded a new version of The Monitors in the late 1980s, with lead singer Darrell Littlejohn (a nephew of Smokey Robinson), Warren Harris, Maurice Fagin, Herschel Hunter, and Leah Harris, but without Street. The group released a new album, Grazing in the Grass, on Levine's Motorcity label. One single, "Standing Still" was released, in 1990.

The Elgins Meet The Monitors, a British import CD, was released in 1997. It pairs their sole album for Motown with one by fellow Motown group The Elgins. It contains every track from each of their LPs, along with some previously unreleased Monitors songs. In 2011, their compilation album, Say You! The Motown Anthology 1963–1968, was released. It compiles all the songs recorded by The Monitors at their tenure at Motown, released under the Kent Soul label (an Ace Records subsidiary that releases Northern Soul music), including every track from their 1968 album Greetings! We're The Monitors. The album also contains many other songs that were not included in their debut album; there are several B-sides from singles that were released by the group, including "All for Someone" and "Don't Put Off 'Til Tomorrow What You Can Do Today", as well as some previously unreleased tracks like "Crying in the Night".

== Discography ==
=== Albums ===
- Greetings! We're The Monitors (Soul, 1968)
- Grazing in the Grass (Motorcity, 1990)
- The Monitors Meet the Elgins (Marginal, 1997)
- Say You! The Motown Anthology (Kent Soul, 2014)

=== Singles ===
Year	Title and catalogue number	Peak chart positions	
Year	Title and catalogue number	US	US R&B
1964	"Hello Love" (V.I.P. 25010, unreleased) b/w "The Further You Look the Less You See"	—	—
1965	"Say You" (V.I.P. 25028) b/w "All for Someone"	—	36
1966	"Greetings (This Is Uncle Sam)" (V.I.P. 25032) b/w "Number One in Your Heart"	100	21
1966	"Since I Lost You, Girl" (V.I.P. 25039) b/w "Don't Put Off 'Til Tomorrow What You Can Do Today"	117	—
1968	"Bring Back the Love" (V.I.P. 25046) b/w "The Further You Look the Less You Can"	—	—
1968	"Step by Step (Hand in Hand)" (S 35049) b/w "Time Is Passin' By"	—	—
1990	"Standing Still" (MOTC 22) b/w "Standing Still (Instrumental)"	—	—
"—" denotes a single that was not released in that territory or did not chart
