= All Directions =

Studio album by The Temptations
- Released: July 27, 1972
- Recorded: March – June 1972
- Studios: Hitsville USA, Detroit
- Genres: Soul; funk; psychedelic soul
- Length: 33:33
- Labels: Gordy; GS 962
- Producer: Norman Whitfield

The Temptations chronology
Solid Rock (1972)	All Directions (1972)	Masterpiece (1973)

Singles from All Directions
- 1. "Papa Was a Rollin' Stone" Released: September 28, 1972

Professional ratings
Review scores
Source	Rating
AllMusic	4.5/5 stars
Christgau's Record Guide	B+
The Rolling Stone Album Guide	4/5 stars

All Directions is a 1972 album by The Temptations for the Gordy (Motown) label, produced by Norman Whitfield. It reached number two on the Billboard 200, making it the band's most successful non-collaborative album on the chart, and became their twelfth album to reach number one on the Top R&B Albums chart.

== Overview and background ==
The LP features the #1 hit "Papa Was a Rollin' Stone", a twelve-minute cover of a Whitfield-produced Undisputed Truth single. "Papa" won three Grammy Awards in 1973: Best R&B Performance by a Group for the Temptations, Best R&B Instrumental Performance for Whitfield and arranger/conductor Paul Riser's instrumental version of "Papa" on the single's b-side, and Best R&B Song for Whitfield and lyricist Barrett Strong. All Directions was Strong's final LP as the Temptations' lyricist; Strong in fact had no direct involvement in the album as both of his compositions for it – "Papa was a Rollin' Stone" and "Funky Music Sho' 'Nuff Turns Me On" were covers (originally by The Undisputed Truth and Edwin Starr, respectively). Strong left Motown to restart his career as a recording artist.

According to group leader Otis Williams, the Temptations fought "tooth and nail" not to record "Papa Was a Rollin' Stone" or "Run Charlie Run", a socially conscious Black power track (dealing primarily with the phenomenon of white flight) that called for them to repeatedly call out, in an affected Caucasian accent, "the niggers are comin'!" According to legend, lead singer Dennis Edwards didn't want to sing "Papa's" opening lines, because his own father had died on the third of September, but in actuality, Edwards' father had died on the third of October. In addition, his father was a minister, "a good, steady, religious man", not a "rolling stone".

The group was certain that "Papa" and All Directions would flop, and that they would be back to singing ballads like "My Girl" and "Ain't Too Proud to Beg". Although the first single, "Mother Nature", charted at number 92 on the Billboard Pop Singles Chart, "Papa" was a number one hit and is today one of the Temptations' signature songs.

Also included on All Directions are the Edwin Starr cover "Funky Music Sho' 'Nuff Turns Me On" (the b-side to "Mother Nature", a Top 30 R&B hit), the Marvin Gaye & Tammi Terrell cover "Love Woke Me Up This Morning", and "I Ain't Got Nothin'", a rare lead showcase for Otis Williams.

== Legacy ==
The album was included in the book 1001 Albums You Must Hear Before You Die.

== Track listing ==
Side one
No.	Title	Writer(s)	Lead vocalist(s)	Length
1.	"Funky Music Sho Nuff Turns Me On"	Barrett Strong, Norman Whitfield	Dennis Edwards, Richard Street, Damon Harris, Otis Williams and Melvin Franklin	3:05
2.	"Run Charlie Run"	C. Maurice King, Jan Forman	Edwards, Street, Harris, Williams, Franklin	3:01
3.	"Papa Was a Rollin' Stone"	Strong, Whitfield	Edwards, Street, Harris, Franklin	11:45 (Note: The original vinyl version of the album extends the fade-out on "Papa Was a Rollin' Stone", pushing the length of the song to approximately 12:04, despite the sleeve showing 11:45. Subsequent versions of the album (including the CD edition) do in fact feature the song in its more standard/well-known 11:45 duration.)

Side two
No.	Title	Writer(s)	Lead vocals	Length
4.	"Love Woke Me Up This Morning"	Nickolas Ashford, Valerie Simpson	Harris	2:22
5.	"I Ain't Got Nothin'"	C. Maurice King, Evans King	Williams, Franklin	3:33
6.	"The First Time Ever (I Saw Your Face)"	Ewan MacColl	Street	4:11
7.	"Mother Nature"	Nick Zesses, Dino Fekaris	Edwards	3:08
8.	"Do Your Thing"	Isaac Hayes	Street, Harris, Franklin	3:30

== Personnel ==
- Dennis Edwards – vocals (tenor/baritone)
- Damon Harris – vocals (tenor/falsetto)
- Richard Street – vocals (third tenor)
- Melvin Franklin – vocals (bass)
- Otis Williams – vocals (second tenor)
- The Andantes – additional background vocals on "Love Woke Me Up This Morning"
- Norman Whitfield – producer
- The Funk Brothers – instrumentation
- Billy Cooper, Joe Messina, Melvin Ragin (aka Wah Wah Watson), Robert Ward, Paul Warren, Robert White, Eddie Willis – guitar
- Richard "Pistol" Allen, Uriel Jones, Aaron Smith, Andrew Smith – drums
- Earl Van Dyke – piano
- Johnny Griffith – organ
- Bob Babbitt, James Jamerson, Leroy Taylor – bass guitar
- Jack Ashford – tambourine, maracas, sticks, etc.
- Jack Brokensha – timpani, vibes, bells, gourd
- Eddie "Bongo" Brown – bongo, conga
- Maurice Davis – trumpet

== Charts ==
=== Weekly charts ===
Chart (1972)	Peak position
Canadian Albums (RPM)	26
French Albums (SNEP)	8
German Albums (Offizielle Top 100)	20
Spanish Albums (AFE)	9
UK Albums (OCC)	19
US Billboard 200	2
US R&B Albums	1

=== Year-end charts ===
Chart (1973)	Peak position
US R&B Albums	19

=== Singles ===
"Mother Nature"	Gordy single 7119, June 1, 1972; B-side: "Funky Music Sho' Nuff Turns Me On"; US Pop Singles #92; US R&B Singles #27
"Funky Music Sho' Nuff Turns Me On"	B-side of "Mother Nature"; US R&B Singles #27
"Papa Was a Rollin' Stone [Vocal]"	Gordy single 7121, September 28, 1972; B-side: "Papa Was a Rollin' Stone [Instrumental]"; US Pop Singles #1; US R&B Singles #5; 1973 Grammy Award Winner; Best R&B Performance by a Group; Best R&B Instrumental Performance; Best R&B Song

== See also ==
- List of number-one R&B albums of 1972 (U.S.)
