= The Valadiers =

American vocal group in 1960s

- Origin: Detroit, Michigan, U.S.
- Genres: R&B, vocal group
- Years active: 1959–1964, late 1980s, 2009–present
- Labels: Miracle, Gordy, Motorcity
- Members: Stuart Avig; Andy Alonzo; Donald Revels; Charlie Valverde
- Past members: Marty Coleman; Art Glasser; Jerry Light
- Website: http://www.valadiers.com/

The Valadiers are an American vocal group from Detroit, Michigan, who became notable as the first white vocal group signed to Motown in the early 1960s.

The group was formed in 1959 by Stuart Avig (born 1943, lead vocals), Marty Coleman (lead, bass, baritone), and Art Glasser (second tenor), who had all attended Oak Park High School, and Jerry Light (bass, baritone), from Detroit Mumford High School. After auditioning for Motown, they received a contract and made recordings which went unreleased, before recording a song they had written, "Greetings (This Is Uncle Sam)." The song was worked up by Motown staffers Robert Bateman, Brian Holland, and Ronnie Dunbar, who received co-writing credits, and was issued on the Miracle label, a Motown subsidiary for which this was its only hit record. The record reached #89 on the Billboard pop chart in 1961. The song also became a minor hit for the Monitors in 1966. The Valadiers toured widely in packages with R&B stars including Marv Johnson, the Isley Brothers and Wilbert Harrison, and continued to release occasional singles with little success until 1964, when they split up.

Stuart Avig spent time in the US Army, later recorded as a solo singer under the name Stuart Ames, and occasionally performed with backup singers as The Valadiers. Coleman worked as a staff songwriter for Motown under the name Martin Cohen, placing songs with The Spinners, Gladys Knight & the Pips, and others. His biggest hit as a songwriter was The Precisions' "If This Is Love (I'd Rather Be Lonely)", which was issued on Drew Records.

Avig later worked in the precious metals business. In the 1980s, English record producer Ian Levine recorded him with other singers, as The Valadiers, issuing two singles on his Motorcity label.

In 2003, Avig reformed the group with new members Andy Alonzo, Donald Revels, and Nick Marinelli. Marinelli was an original member of The Shades of Blue, and the quartet began performing together under both names. The current group, consisting of Avig, Revels, Charlie Valverde, and Charles Davis, continues to perform together as the Valadiers and The Shades of Blue.
