= WGLS-FM =

Radio station at Rowan University in Glassboro, New Jersey

Coordinates: 39.6948°N 75.2982°W

- Glassboro, New Jersey; United States
- Broadcast area: Philadelphia, PA/Glassboro, NJ, U.S.
- Frequency: 89.7 MHz
- Branding: "Rowan Radio"

Programming
- Format: College radio
- Affiliations: Delaware Blue Coats; Wilmington Blue Rocks

Ownership
- Owner: Rowan University

History
- First air date: 1964
- Call sign meaning: W GLassboro State College

Technical information
- Licensing authority: FCC
- Facility ID: 57778
- Class: A
- ERP: 750 watts
- HAAT: 149 meters

Links
- Public license information: Public file; LMS
- Website: http://wgls.rowan.edu

WGLS-FM (89.7 MHz), known as Rowan Radio, is a college radio station licensed to Rowan University. The studios are located in the College of Communication on the campus of Rowan University in Glassboro, New Jersey. WGLS-FM is Gloucester County's only FM radio station.

WGLS's programming features a variety of music, sports, cultural, educational programs focused towards the interest of the Rowan University and South Jersey communities.

The call letters for WGLS hearken back to the former name of the institution: W GLassboro State College.

The station has won numerous local and national awards, including being named "College Station of the Year" and "Best Best Four-Year Radio Station of the Year".

== History ==
Glassboro State College was granted a construction permit by the FCC to build a low watt FM radio station on the campus on May 17, 1963 and a broadcast license was issued the following year on April 9, 1964. 89.7 WGLS-FM went on the air with funding provided by the college's Library Department. The library's Educational Media Director William McCavitt served as the first faculty supervisor of the 10-watt mono radio station until 1966. He left Glassboro State and went on to establish two more college stations, WIUP-FM for Indiana University of Pennsylvania and WCUC-FM at Clarion University located in Clarion, Pennsylvania.

Other faculty members continued to advise the students of WGLS, including 1967 supervisor George Reinfeld, who would eventually help establish the college's Department of Communication. Joe Salviuolo was the station's advisor in 1968, but ultimately left academia to become a songwriter, producer and manager. Under the stage name "Sal Joseph", he collaborated with popular folk artist Jim Croce on the hit, "Thursday". Dr. Gregory Potter, from the GSC Library Department, took over management of WGLS in 1969, and successfully led the effort to update the college's radio studio in the campus’ Bole Hall building, as well as correcting various engineering and transmission issues.

By 1970, the school's Library Department relinquished control of WGLS to the Department of Fine and Performing Arts. Dean Armand Vorce and advisor Bob Blake kept WGLS broadcasting until 1973, when it was decided that the radio station's broadcast license would be released back to the FCC due to management and operational concerns. Student Station Manager Jim Servino successfully petitioned Glassboro State's then president Dr. Mark Chamberlain to keep the license, and to allow the students to manage WGLS on their own.

Servino and students enlisted the help of Communications professor Mike Donovan to help consult the radio station. WGLS then lobbied for an estimated $70,000 in funding from the school's Student Government Association for technical upgrades. The station moved across campus to Savitz Library, a new 50-foot tower was erected, and the transmitter power increased from 10 watts to 440 watts. By 1977, WGLS moved to larger studio space within Savitz Library and began to broadcast in stereo.

Following the tenure of station advisors Mike Donovan (1973 to 1988) and Phylis Johnson (1988 to 1990), the college decided that a dedicated full-time Station Manager was needed in order for WGLS-FM to grow. Former WFIL-AM broadcaster Frank Hogan assumed the newly created role in 1991. At the time, Hogan was serving Glassboro State College as a ¾ time radio professor, having previously worked as the engineering consultant on the station's 1977 stereo and studio upgrades.

With the 1992 name change of Glassboro State College to Rowan University due to a $100 million donation from industrialist Henry Rowan, WGLS-FM re-branded itself as "Rowan Radio". The station's antenna moved to the Glassboro city water tower in 1993, and the increased height boosted the station's power to an effective radiated power of 640 watts. In 1995, Rowan Radio 89.7 WGLS-FM evolved from a student radio club into a permanently incorporated aspect of the newly created College of Communication and Creative Arts. WGLS-FM moved again into its fourth studio home on campus inside the then recently expanded Bozorth Hall building January 1996.

Rowan Radio began streaming over the internet in 2000. In January 2001, the station's transmitter was relocated 9 miles off campus to a 500-foot tower in South Harrison Twp., NJ, again increasing its signal strength to an ERP of 750 watts. Sports broadcaster and college instructor Derek Jones and former commercial radio producer Leo Kirschner succeeded Frank Hogan upon his retirement in 2013.

== Programming ==
Rowan Radio 89.7 WGLS-FM since its inception in 1964 has maintained a "variety" format in its programming choices, which reflect FCC guidelines regarding the need for licensed radio stations to operate in the public interest and serve their communities. The mixed variety format also allows WGLS’ student broadcasters to experience all kinds of radio programming as part of their studies.

Unlike many college radio stations that air a "free-form radio" format, WGLS-FM's broadcast schedule employs the practices of "horizontal programming" and "dayparting". Implemented by station manager Frank Hogan in 1991, Rowan Radio's programming schedule consists of daily music shows airing at the same time weekdays with specialized niche music and talk programming on the weekends. Regular programming is sometimes pre-empted for the station's seasonal coverage of Rowan University Division III athletic games.

Rowan Radio's current weekday programming schedule includes:

- 7a-9a The Early Bird Special Morning Show
- 9a-6p The Music That Matters (Classic Hits Format)
- 6p-8p Pop Flavor (CHR, Top 40 Format)
- 8p-10p Pop Gold (1990-2010 CHR, Top 40 Format)
- 10p-12a Rowan Radio Rock (Modern, Alternative, Classic Rock Format)
- 12a-7a Overnight Flight (Progressive Rock Format)

Weekend Programming consists of more niche programming selections highlighting music from genres such as Broadway, Classical, Oldies, and Metal. Weekend shows include "The 80's Arcade", "The Icon Rock Show", "The Sammy Pepper Show", "Saturday Night At The Oldies", "Sunday Sounds Of Music", "The Sunday Matinee" and more.

Public Affairs programming is produced by university students, instructors and civic leaders discussing a variety of local and national topics. Past and present shows and podcasts include:

- "A Community Affair"
- "The African American Profile"
- "The American Dream"
- "Your Health Matters"
- "Studio 89.7"
- "The ARC Report" (produced in association with The ARC of Gloucester County, NJ)
- "Everything Special Needs"
- "Career Talk"
- "Writers Roundtable"
- "Beyond The Brown and Gold"
- "The Rowan Sport Review"
- "The Rowan Report"
- "Offsides"
- "Third and Long"

== Awards ==
Since its incorporation with Rowan University's College of Communication in 1995, 89.7 WGLS-FM has won over 390 broadcasting awards in local and national contests. WGLS won "College Station of the Year" in 1997 from the National Association of College Broadcasters, as well as "Best Four-Year Radio Station of the Year" in 2022 and 2023 from the College Media Association.

The college station has won numerous accolades for its various programming including honors from the Gracie Awards, The Broadcast Education Association, The Communicator Awards, College Broadcasters, Inc., The Philadelphia Press Association and The New Jersey Broadcasters Association.

== See also ==
- List of radio stations in New Jersey
- List of college radio stations in the United States
