= Henry Rowan =

American engineer and philanthropist (1923–2015)

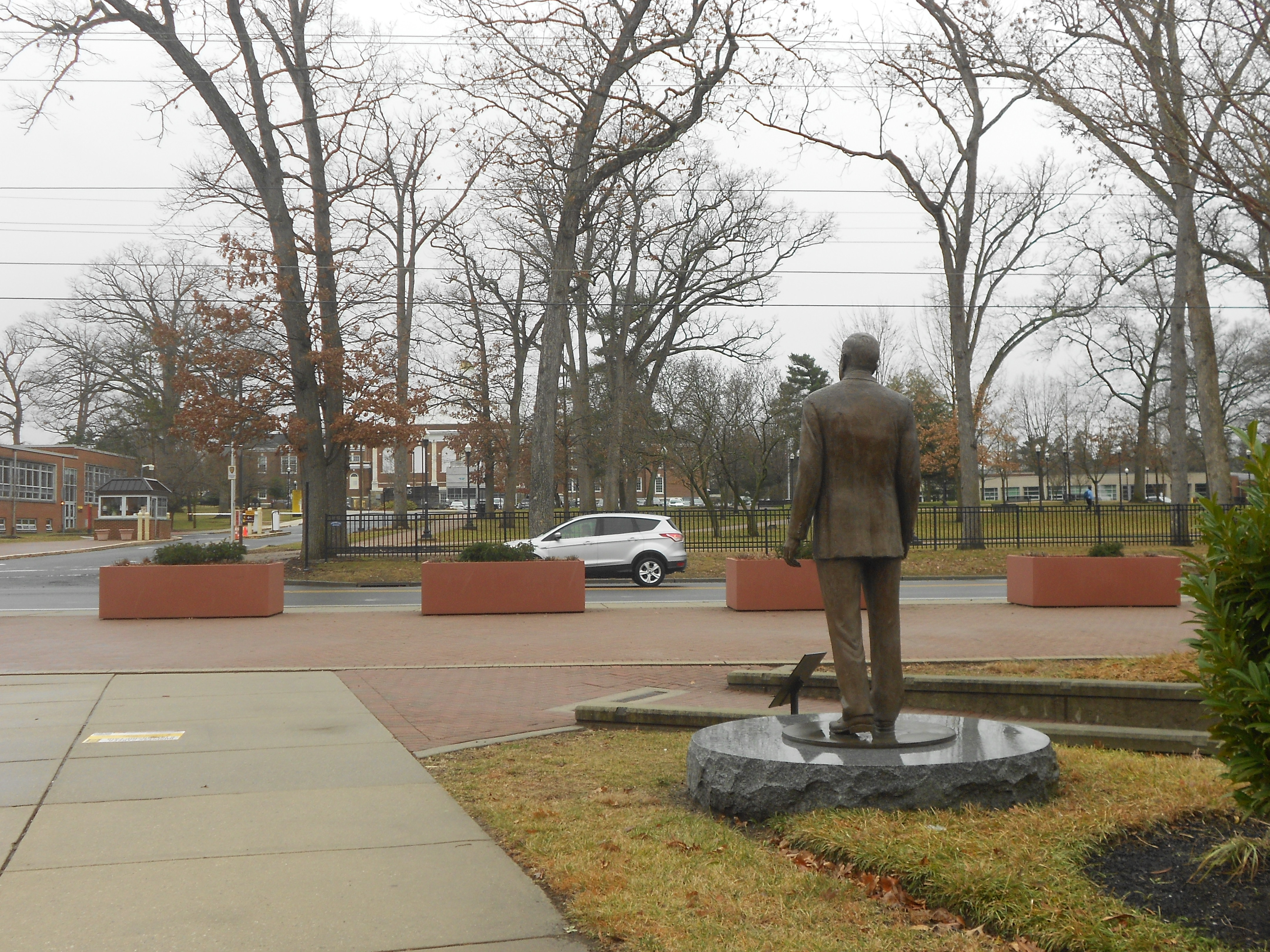
A statue of Rowan on the campus of Rowan University in Glassboro, New Jersey

Henry Madison "Hank" Rowan Jr. (December 4, 1923 – December 9, 2015) was an American engineer, businessman, and philanthropist.

He was the founder of Inductotherm Corp. and the first person to give a $100 million donation to school of higher education in the US, which he gave to Glassboro State College of New Jersey, which was renamed Rowan College of New Jersey later Rowan University in his honour.

== Early life and education ==
Rowan was born in Raphine, Virginia, on December 4, 1923, to Henry Rowan Sr. and Margaret Frances Boyd Rowan.

He grew up in Ridgewood, New Jersey and, after serving as a bomber pilot in World War II with the United States Army Air Forces, attended Williams College and graduated from Massachusetts Institute of Technology with honors with a degree in electrical engineering.

== Career ==
=== Early career ===
Rowan originally worked for Ajax Electrothermic Corporation in Trenton, New Jersey. He suggested improvements to the furnaces made by Ajax (ie shorter power leads and heavier copper bus bar) but the company did not implement his suggestions. Rowan subsequently left Ajax and decided to start his own company, Inductotherm Corp.

=== Inductotherm Corp ===
Rowan designed and built his first induction furnace in 1953 in the garage of his home in Ewing Township, New Jersey with the help of his wife.

Expanding from this first induction furnace, Rowan created Inductotherm, which has since grown to include more than 40 subsidiaries throughout North America, South America, Europe, Asia and Australia.

There are more than 27,000 Inductotherm induction melting installations worldwide and they account for more than half of the melting systems in the world today.

== Philanthropy ==
=== Rowan University ===
In Spring 1992, Rowan and his wife Betty pledged $100 million to Glassboro State College in New Jersey, which was renamed Rowan College of New Jersey in his honor and later Rowan University. At the time, it was the largest gift to a public college in the history of higher education. The school also has an engineering building named after him.

=== Doane Academy ===
Rowan and his wife were also strong supporters of Doane Academy, a pre-K through secondary school, in Burlington, NJ.

In January 2015, they created the Henry M. and Eleanor E. Rowan Endowment, with a gift of $17 million.

The Rowans, personally and through their family foundation, donated over $30 million to Doane Academy over the years.

== Later life and death ==
Rowan competed in the 1992 Olympic Sailing trials in Miami, but failed to qualify. In 1995, he wrote an autobiography titled The Fire Within with John Calhoun Smith.

He lived in Westampton Township, New Jersey, for part of his life.

On December 9, 2015, Rowan died at the age of 92.
