= WNAP (Pennsylvania) =

Norristown, Pennsylvania; United States
- Broadcast area: Philadelphia, Pennsylvania
- Frequency: 1110 kHz
- Branding: "Gospel Highway Eleven"

Programming
- Format: Defunct (was gospel)

Ownership
- Owner: WNAP, Inc

History
- First air date: 1947
- Former call signs: WNAR (1947–1984); WGHW (1984–1987)
- Call sign meaning: Norristown Area

Technical information
- Facility ID: 73313
- Class: D
- Power: 4,800 watts (day); 500 watts (critical hours)
- Transmitter coordinates: 40°08′5.00″N 75°18′45.00″W

Links
- Website: Official Website

WNAP was a class D AM radio station on 1110 kHz serving the Norristown, Pennsylvania, area. WNAP (also known as Gospel Highway 11) broadcast gospel music. Today, Gospel Highway 11 continues to service the community as 24-hour online radio station.

During its lifespan as a daytime-only station, WNAP's frequency was occupied by WBT from Charlotte, North Carolina, in the evenings.

The call sign WNAP were originally used by major station (nicknamed "The Buzzard") in Indianapolis, Indiana, on 93.1 FM from 1968 to 1986. The call sign was reused by that station from 1994 to 2000, but with an "-FM" suffix due to this Pennsylvania AM-band station having taken over the root call sign in the interim.

WNAP signed off March 1, 2021, and sold its broadcast tower, initially hoping to find another tower site to resume operations. The station's license was surrendered to the FCC on April 13. Its programming continues to be carried on the Internet.
