= Say You (Motown song) =

1965 song performed by The Temptations

Single by The Monitors

from the album Greetings! We're The Monitors
- B-side: "All For Someone"
- Released: November 1965
- Recorded: July 1965; Hitsville USA (Studio A) (Detroit, Michigan)
- Genre: Soul
- Length: 2:37
- Label: V.I.P. (Motown); V.I.P. 25028
- Songwriter(s): Robert Staunton, Robert Dobyne, Charles Jones
- Producer(s): Robert Staunton, Robert Walker

The Monitors singles chronology
"Hello Love" (1964)	"Say You" (1965)	"Greetings (This Is Uncle Sam)" (1966)

"Say You"

Song by The Temptations

from the album Gettin' Ready
- Released: June 15, 1966
- Recorded: June, 1965; Hitsville USA (Studio A) (Detroit, Michigan)
- Genre: Soul
- Length: 2:30
- Label: Gordy (Motown)
- Songwriter(s): Robert Staunton, Robert Dobyne, Charles Jones
- Producer(s): Robert Staunton, Robert Walker

"Say You" is a 1965 soul song, written by Robert Dobyne, Robert Staunton and Charles Jones, and recorded by both The Monitors, who had a charting R&B Hit with the song, and The Temptations.

The Monitors' version was recorded in July 1965 and released as the group's debut single for Motown Records. Their previous single, "Hello Love", was planned for release on Motown's VIP subsidiary (as VIP 25010) but cancelled. That single was scheduled for release under the group's original name, The Majestics. "Say You" was also released initially as crediting The Majestics before a name change was forced upon them by the existence of another Majestics group. Upon release, the song became a minor R&B hit, making #36 on the Billboard Soul Charts. "Say You" is also included on The Monitors' debut (and only) album for Motown, Greetings! We're The Monitors, released in November of 1968.

Motown's The Temptations had originally recorded the song about one month before The Monitors (in June 1965), and their version was released on the group's fourth album, 1966's Gettin' Ready.

David Ruffin sung lead on the Tempts' version, with Melvin Franklin leading a line on the song's bridge. Richard Street (who would later join the Tempts' years later) led the Monitors' version.

In the song itself, the narrator pleads to his lover asking her to confirm their love. The song's title is in answer to a question the narrator asks of her in the first verse:

Say you
Who do you belong to?
Say you
I've been longing to need you

Some 46 years after the single release of "Say You", a Monitors compilation album entitled Say You! The Complete Motown Recordings was released, containing all of the group's recordings for Motown from 1963 to 1968. It was released by Ace Records' soul subsidiary label Kent Soul, in June 2011.

== Personnel ==
=== Monitors' version ===
- Lead vocals by Richard Street
- Backing vocals by Sandra Fagin, Maurice Fagin, Warren Harris, and The Andantes: Jackie Hicks, Marlene Barrow and Louvain Demps
- Instrumentation by The Funk Brothers and the Detroit Symphony Orchestra

=== Temptations' version ===
- Lead vocals by David Ruffin and Melvin Franklin
- Backing vocals by Melvin Franklin, Eddie Kendricks, Paul Williams, Otis Williams
- Instrumentation by The Funk Brothers and the Detroit Symphony Orchestra
