= WBZC =

Radio station in Pemberton, New Jersey

- Pemberton, New Jersey; United States
- Broadcast area: Southern New Jersey, Metro Philadelphia and the Delaware Valley region
- Frequency: 88.9 MHz
- Branding: Word FM

Programming
- Format: Contemporary Christian

Ownership
- Owner: Four Rivers Community Broadcasting Corporation
- Sister stations: WBYO

History
- First air date: January 1995

Technical information
- Licensing authority: FCC
- Facility ID: 7844
- Class: B1
- ERP: 10,000 watts
- HAAT: 67 meters (220 ft)
- Transmitter coordinates: 39°50′34.00″N 74°32′40.00″W

Links
- Public license information: Public file; LMS

WBZC (88.9 FM) is a radio station licensed to Four Rivers Community Broadcasting Corporation in Pemberton, New Jersey, United States. At 10,000 watts, the station serves Burlington County, New Jersey, and the metro Philadelphia region. When it was a college radio station, it was one of the most powerful college radio stations in the country. WBZC's frequency allocation was made possible after The University of Pennsylvania's WXPN in Philadelphia moved from 88.9 FM to its present frequency of 88.5 FM in 1991. Previously owned by Rowan College at Burlington County, the station is now fully owned by Four Rivers Community Broadcasting Corporation airing a Christian radio format.

WBZC began broadcasting in January 1995, and in early 1996 was named the number one college radio station in America based on listenership, large coverage area in the nation's 9th largest radio market and unique programming and content. The award was bestowed by the National Association of College Broadcasters in Providence, Rhode Island. The station was a platform launching many careers of prominent broadcasters in the industry today.

With the moving of the Pemberton campus of Burlington County College, the station ceased its regional programming and transmission on January 18, 2018.

After being sold to Four Rivers Community Broadcasting Corporation in March 2019, WBZC came back on the air with Word FM and Rowan College's part of the radio station became known as RCBC Podcast Network. Today, WBZC broadcasts 10,000 watts of Christian radio across the Delaware Valley.

== Programming ==
In its heyday as a college radio station, the 10,000-watt powerhouse was nominated for several awards including Best U.S. Dance station at the International Music Awards and became a six-time finalist at the Philadelphia Achievement Radio Awards, where the station competed against major US commercial stations. In 1996 the radio station was named number one college radio station in America by the National Association of College Broadcasters, at the time known for its news, talk and public service programming. Brett Holcomb, formerly of Philadelphia’s WIP (610 AM), was the operations manager and program director from 2005 to 2014. From 2014 until 2018, the station was programmed by Jay Varga, formerly of Philadelphia rock station WYSP.

== Transmitter and translators ==
In early 2007, the station completed a massive power upgrade, going from 7.5 kW vertical/350 watts horizontal to 10 kW vertical/470 watts horizontal, with a vertical directional antenna. The transmitter site was moved to a communications tower in Chatsworth, New Jersey, near the intersection of New Jersey Route 72 and County Route 563. In addition to the main transmitter, WBZC was relayed by two translators to widen its broadcast area; the W236AF translator operated at 95.1 MHz from high atop the Burlington-Bristol Bridge. Translator W264BH at 100.7 MHz, which was sold shortly before WBZC ceased broadcasting, was located prominently on the roof of Virtua Hospital in Mount Holly.

== Notable alumni ==
▪️Aaron Bradley, Voice of CNN, former TV news anchor. Host of “Aaron in the Afternoon” on WBZC, 1997-1999.
