= Marilyn Marshall (singer) =

American jazz musician

Marilyn Marshall (October 15, 1941 - November 11, 2015) was an American singer of jazz, rhythm and blues, and gospel music. She toured throughout the United States, Canada and the Bahamas. Marshall was a veteran of stage and television and received “Entertainer of The Year” honors three years in a row in her home county of Burlington County, New Jersey.

== Early years ==
Marilyn Marshall was born to Rev. William C. and Esther F. (Groce) McMillan in New York City on October 15, 1941. She began singing when she was three years old. She began playing piano by ear at the age of six; however, she took music lessons, which according to her music instructor could not last too long because she was playing unusual chord changes better than the music teacher. Marshall liked to write poems and soon wrote lyrics to melodies she composed. She played both piano and organ.

In the fall of 1965, during an afternoon of rehearsal, a bandleader approached asked if she would be interested in joining his group as an organist and vocalist. The group was already contracted for engagements at the Officer's Club at McGuire AFB as well as the Fort Dix Officer's Club in New Jersey.

Marshall was the lead vocalist for a variety of acts, including touring the Jersey shore circuit in the 1970s with the Jackie Vee Band. She was a featured vocalist for the Count Basie Orchestra. She worked at Club Harlem in Atlantic City, opening for James Brown and Junior Walker and the All-Stars.

Her television appearances include being a regular entertainer on Dialing For Dollars with Larry Ferrari, and on Al Alberts Showcase airing on WPVI-TV 6 ABC in Philadelphia. She also made a guest appearance on Bill Cosby's You Bet Your Life television show. She has shared the stage and opened for The Intruders, Delfonics, G.C. Cameron, The Blue Notes’ Gil Saunders, Bunny Sigler, and Richard Street and Damon Harris.

Her debut album, Just Us Two, was released in 1996, and the featured track "Give Me Back Romance" gained local airplay on WCBS FM, WDAS-FM, WBZC and WRDV FM in Philadelphia.

Her philanthropic efforts include performances for a 2001 benefit for the national Damon Harris Cancer Foundation; Linda Creed Breast Cancer Foundation, 2002; Bill Deal Cystic Fibrosis Fund, 2003; and donates a portion of the proceeds from her album Hold On and entertains at the annual fundraiser for Hold on to Education Foundation Inc.

== Career highlights ==
Marshall composed and produced the album, Hold On. Her single and albums have been featured, reviewed and charted in the industry trade publications Billboard, Dance Music Authority, Blues and Soul Magazine, and In The Basement Magazine.

Marshall has donated portions of the album's proceeds to private rehabilitation facilities for substance abuse and those suffering from bipolar disorder as a result of chemical abuse.

Her 1990s appearances in included Prospectors Night Club in Mount Laurel, New Jersey, at Club Vegas opening for Jay-Z in Philadelphia, and a summer tropical tour with performances for resident DJ Joey Jam's productions at Club Atlantis on Paradise Island in the Bahamas. Her music receives continued support from DJs at the annual DJ Times International Expo in Atlantic City, New Jersey.

== Awards and honors ==
In 2001 Marshall received commendations and praise from the Seventh New Jersey Legislative District through their elected official for 35 years of entertainment. She was also honored with a proclamation from the Mayor of her hometown of Willingboro Township, New Jersey.

The Delaware Valley Chapter of the NAACP awarded Marshall the 2003 Humanitarian Award for her philanthropic contributions to the community, and her innovative teaching strategies in the classroom.

In July 2010 Marshall was honored by Radio TV Personality Diane Brown at "A Tribute to Legends" held at the original American Bandstand studio at the Enterprise Center in Philadelphia. The New Jersey Legislature honored her with a Joint Legislative Resolution on July 12, 2013, at a Black Tie Dinner & Ball for the NJ State Federation of Colored Woman's Club & Youth Affiliates. She received the Nora G. Fant Humanitarian Award in celebration of her charitable works.

In addition to her music career, Marshall was also an educator, having taught Special Education and Fine Arts in the Burlington Township School District, Atco District and the Willingboro Township Public Schools. Marshall has also received her Doctorate in Education. She is a founding member and the first program director for the non-profit organization "Hold On To Education Foundation". Marshall served for 21 years as the choir director for Union A.M.E. Church in Allentown, New Jersey.

Her album Reflections was released in 2011, produced by John Legend's horn arranger Stephen Tirpak. Her backing band for the studio sessions is the Palmer Jenkins Ensemble. The album includes Club remixes of her single "Hold On". Her most recent appearances include the Willingboro Jazz Festival, with Spyro Gyra. Marshall was also a presenter at the R&B Music Hall of Fame's Inaugural Awards Gala held at the Waetjen Auditorium at Cleveland State University in August 2013. The Global Entertainment Media Arts Foundation recognized Marshall for her humanitarian efforts, contribution to Music Entertainment, and dedication to youth education. She received their Golden Mic Award honors on Friday October 9, 2015, in Wilmington, Delaware. One of her last live performances include the Golden Mic Awards Live Concert at the Prince Music Theater in Philadelphia on Saturday October 10, 2015. She was backed by the DeVerne D. Williams Vintage Soul Orchestra and appeared with Scherrie Payne formerly of The Supremes; Melba Moore; Jean Carne; Sarah Dash of Labelle; Joe Bataan; Anita Ward; Jeannie Tracy; Carol Williams; the Ladies of Skyy; Mara Justine of America's Got Talent; and Norman Connors.

== Death ==
Marshall died from congestive heart failure on Wednesday November 11, 2015 with her family by her side at Penn Presbyterian Medical Center in Philadelphia. She was 74. Funeral Services were held on Saturday November 21, 2015 at Union A.M.E. Church in Allentown New Jersey. Services were led by her Pastor Rev. Carl Wade with guest vocalist Nicolette Muse who appears on Marshall's "Hold On" album. In attendance was her original band of 40 years featuring saxophonist Tyrone Belford, Jazz musician and guitarist Gary Little, and Apollo Theater keyboardist and trombonist Clarence Watson. Willingboro NJ Mayor Eddie Campbell Jr. presented a Proclamation honoring her work as a musician, recording artist, singer, educator, and humanitarian Marilyn Marshall during the service.
