= Damon Harris =

American singer (1950–2013)

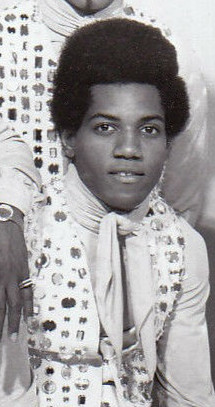
- Harris in 1971 with The Temptations

Background information
- Born: Otis Robert Harris Jr. July 17, 1950; Baltimore, Maryland, U.S.
- Died: February 18, 2013 (aged 62) Baltimore, Maryland, U.S.
- Genres: R&B, pop, soul,
- Occupation: Singer
- Instrument: Vocals
- Years active: 1966–1978
- Labels: T-Neck; Motown; Atco; Fantasy
- Formerly of: The Temptations

Otis Robert "Damon" Harris Jr. (July 17, 1950 – February 18, 2013) was an American soul and R&B singer, most notable as a member of The Temptations from 1971 to 1975. Harris was the youngest member of The Temptations, joining the group at the age of twenty.

As a teenager, Harris formed a Temptations tribute band named The Young Tempts (a.k.a. The Young Vandals). The group had charted singles on T-Neck Records and later had a few minor hits under the name Impact. He was also instrumental in helping his former band mate, Billy Griffin, to replace Smokey Robinson for The Miracles. Harris later founded and became the CEO of the Damon Harris Cancer Foundation, which is dedicated to promoting the awareness, diagnosis, and treatment of prostate cancer.

== Biography ==
Harris was born on July 17, 1950, in Baltimore, Maryland. Harris attended Forest Park High School and graduated from Northwestern High School. He had once planned to be an athlete, but reconsidered.

=== The Young Tempts/The Young Vandals (1966–1970) ===
As a teenager growing up in Baltimore, Maryland, Harris was a major Temptations fan, and idolized in particular the group's falsetto, Eddie Kendricks. Patterning himself after Kendricks, Harris and his friends John Quinton Simms, Charles Timmons (also known as Kareem Ali, who went on to perform with Glenn Leonard's Temptations Revue), and Donald Knute Tighman, formed a Temptations-inspired vocal group during his high school years called The Young Tempts ("Tempts" being a nickname for the Temptations).

The Young Tempts recorded covers of two 1966 Temptations' songs, "I've Been Good to You" (a song originally recorded by The Miracles), and "Too Busy Thinking About My Baby," for The Isley Brothers' T-Neck Records in 1970. Motown Records filed an injunction against T-Neck because of the group's name; the single was withdrawn and re-issued with the group credited as The Young Vandals, and reached #46 on the R&B charts.

After two more T-Neck singles, "In My Opinion" and "I'm Gonna Wait For You", The Young Vandals broke up, because Harris felt that college would be a more sensible endeavor than a singing career.

=== The Temptations (1971–1975) ===
In June 1971, a friend convinced Harris to audition for The Temptations, at the Watergate Hotel in Washington, D.C. Eddie Kendricks had left the group and was replaced with Ricky Owens from The Vibrations. According to Otis Williams, Owens was giving uneven performances, and The Temptations were again looking for a replacement. Harris first performed for Melvin Franklin, Richard Street, and Dennis Edwards before auditioning for Williams. Williams was hesitant about taking on the young singer, who was nearly a decade younger than the rest of The Temptations. Franklin, Street, and Edwards voted to accept Harris, however, and he made his onstage debut a few weeks later as first tenor/falsetto.

Harris' first album with the Temptations was Solid Rock, performing falsetto vocals on hits such as "Superstar (Remember How You Got Where You Are)" (1971) and "Take a Look Around" (1972). Harris later provided vocals on the hit single "Papa Was a Rollin' Stone" (1972, a three-time Grammy Award winner), "Masterpiece" (1973), and "Plastic Man" (1973). He sang lead on "Love Woke Me Up This Morning" from the All Directions album (1972) and was featured prominently on The Temptations in Japan (1973).

By 1975, Williams observed a change in Harris' behavior, writing he was "respectful, easy to work with, and a generally great guy to have around. Once the probation ended and the big money started coming in, things changed." During meetings, Harris began questioning how things were run in the group and wanted Edwards to complain as well. Edwards however refused. While recording the song "Glasshouse", Harris refused to follow Berry Gordy's instructions, in which Gordy instructed Williams to "get rid of him." During a performance at the Apollo Theater, Harris gave an impromptu speech, thanking the audience on behalf of the group for helping them to "buy these fine mink coats and beautiful cars and homes and diamonds". Harris was subsequently fired from the group in 1975.

=== Impact (1976–1978) ===
After leaving the Temptations, Harris reformed The Young Vandals with Simms, Timmons (Kareem Ali), and Tilghman, renaming the group Impact. They signed a deal with WMOT Records in 1976, recording a self-titled album with two singles, "Happy Man" and "Give a Broken Heart a Break". In 1977, Impact signed with Fantasy Records, which issued the album The Pac is Back. In 1978, Harris released a solo album titled Silk.

=== Later years ===
Harris soon retired from music and earned a degree in music from the University of Nevada. After graduating, he worked as a music teacher for special education students at Earl Wooster High School in Reno, Nevada. In 1995, he relaunched his music career, in which he re-released the album Silk. He also began touring, sometimes billing himself as The Temptations Review Starring Damon Harris. Richard Street and Glenn Leonard both ex-Temptations, periodically performed with Harris' Temptations review until they formed their own Temptations groups. He also briefly toured with former Temptations David Ruffin, Eddie Kendricks and Dennis Edwards before Ruffin and Kendricks died.

== Personal life and death ==
In October 1971, Harris met his future wife, Christina Combs, at the backstage of the Apollo Theater. In August 1973, they were married at the St. Augustine's Episcopal Chapel in New York City. The couple had two children, Otis Robert Harris III and Dominique Chris-Ann Harris.

At the age of 47, Harris was diagnosed with prostate cancer, while making a comeback into the music industry. In September 2000, Harris (who, at the time, was in remission) went public with his bout, telling Billboard magazine: "I had two choices. Be despondent and get mad at God, or accept it and do something positive." A month later, his health struggle was profiled in The New York Times. In 2001, Harris founded The Damon Harris Cancer Foundation, a non-profit organization designed to raise awareness of prostate cancer diagnoses and treatments. The organization has a special focus in reaching Black audiences, as Black men have an approximately 60 percent higher chance of contracting prostate cancer than white men, and are twice as likely to die from the disease.

On May 5, 2001, South Jersey radio host Tim Marshall organized the first Damon Harris Cancer Foundation Benefit Gala held in Mount Laurel NJ. Entertainers including Ms. Marilyn Marshall and The Delfonics paid tribute to Harris who was honored for his charitable works. Harris received a Proclamation from the New Jersey Legislature presented by State Senator Diane Allen. Harris was also a regular guest co-host on R&B Showcase Radio Show on WBZC FM in South Jersey.

On February 18, 2013, Harris died at a Baltimore hospice from prostate cancer, at the age of 62. He died a week and a half before fellow Temptation Richard Street.

== Discography ==
=== Impact albums ===
- 1976: Impact
- 1977: The Pac is Back

=== Solo albums ===
- 1978: Silk

== Bibliography ==
- Turner, Tony; Aria, Barbara (1992). Deliver Us from Temptation: The Tragic and Shocking Story of the Temptations and Motown. New York: Thunder's Mouth Press. ISBN 1-56025-0348.
- Ribowsky, Mark (2010). Ain't Too Proud to Beg: The Troubled Lives and Enduring Soul of the Temptations. Hoboken, New Jersey: John Wiley & Sons. ISBN 978-0-470-26117-0.
- Williams, Otis; Romanowski, Patricia (2002) [1988]. Temptations. Cooper Square Press. ISBN 978-0-815-41218-2.
