= Richard Street =

American singer (1942–2013)

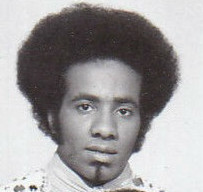
- Street in 1971

Background information
- Birth name: Richard Allen Street
- Born: October 5, 1942; Detroit, Michigan, U.S.
- Died: February 27, 2013 (aged 70); Las Vegas, Nevada, U.S.
- Genres: R&B, pop, soul, disco
- Occupation(s): Singer, dancer, songwriter
- Instrument: Vocals
- Years active: 1959–2013
- Labels: Warwick, Motown, Atlantic

Richard Allen Street (October 5, 1942 – February 27, 2013) was an American soul and R&B singer, most notable as a member of Motown vocal group The Temptations from 1971 to 1993. Prior to joining the Temptations, he had been a member of Otis and The Distants in the 50s, a vocal group that was led by Otis Williams.

== Early life ==
Born and raised in Detroit, Michigan, Street was the first member of the Temptations to actually be a native of the city which served as Motown's namesake and hometown; all of the previous members were born and at least partially raised in the southern United States.

== Career ==
=== Otis Williams and the Distants ===
Street was the lead singer of an early Temptations predecessor, Otis Williams & the Distants, and takes the spotlight on their local hit "Come On". The Distants also included future Temptations Otis Williams, Melvin Franklin (who referred to Street as his cousin), and Elbridge "Al" Bryant, who left The Distants and their record deal with Johnnie Mae Matthews' Northern Records to form The Elgins (later The Temptations) with Eddie Kendricks and Paul Williams. After their departure, Matthews had Street briefly lead a new Distants group in the early 1960s.

=== The Monitors ===
During the mid-1960s, Street performed with a Motown act called The Monitors, who had only one minor hit, 1966's "Greetings (This Is Uncle Sam)", which reached #21 on the Billboard R&B Chart, and #100 on the Billboard Pop Singles Chart, to its name. They also had a smaller hit in 1965 by the name of "Say You", which The Temptations also recorded for their Gettin' Ready album.

=== The Temptations ===
Street knew the Temptations and Otis Williams, in particular, having worked for Motown in quality control and through his vocal work with the Distants and the Monitors. By the late-1960s, Street was being called upon to travel with The Temptations and sing Paul Williams' parts from off-stage, while Paul Williams, who suffered from both alcoholism and sickle-cell disease, danced and lip-synched onstage. Street officially replaced Paul Williams in mid-1971, after both he and Eddie Kendricks left the group.

A number of the Temptations' best-selling hits feature Street's lead vocals, including "Superstar (Remember How You Got Where You Are)" (1971), "Papa Was a Rollin' Stone" (1972), "Masterpiece" (1973), and was featured solo on "Hey Girl (I Like Your Style)" (1973) as well as the album cuts "The First Time Ever I Saw Your Face", "Heavenly" (1973), and "Firefly", from the All Directions (1972), 1990 (1973), and A Song for You albums (1975), respectively. Street and Damon Harris traded leads on "Heavenly". He and old Distants bandmates Otis Williams and Melvin Franklin endured a number of lineup changes over the two decades Street was a Temptation, during which time Dennis Edwards, Ricky Owens, Damon Harris, Glenn Leonard, Louis Price, Ron Tyson, and Ali-Ollie Woodson all served as members of the group at various times.

According to Street's own website, he left the group after the "family feeling" of the Temptations deteriorated. He fell out with Otis Williams in 1993 after missing a show because Street entered the hospital to have seventeen kidney stones removed. When the information wasn't relayed to Otis Williams, he confronted Street, demanding to know why he missed his last performance. Street felt that Williams seemed to show a lack of concern, and decided to move on. He was replaced by Theo Peoples.

When asked what the music of the Temptations meant to Street, he stated: "The Temptations songs were message songs of the times, about what was going on with the world. You had to represent your race. People all over the world loved what we did. Back then, we did not have a whole lot of Black people to look up to. We did not know we would make such a stir.”

In 1998, NBC aired The Temptations, a four-hour television miniseries based upon an autobiographical book by Otis Williams. Street was portrayed by actor J. August Richards.

=== Solo work ===
Street continued to tour and perform as a solo artist. At times, he performed as a duo with former Temptations bandmate Damon Harris, who had joined the group at about the same time he did. Street was also a regular guest host with Tim Marshall and Larry Cotton on R&B Showcase Radio Show airing on WBZC FM in South Jersey. He was honored with a New Jersey State Senate Proclamation on May 11, 2002, for his charitable works at a Mount Laurel, NJ benefit for Cancer. The event was presented by R&B Showcase Magazine. Entertainers including Ms. Marilyn Marshall and MTV's "Making The Band" finalists LMNT paid tribute to Richard Street.

== Personal life ==
Street was formerly married to The Velvelettes' lead singer Carolyn "Cal" Gill from 1969 to 1983. A year after their marriage, Street successfully persuaded Gill into breaking up the Velvelettes so she could care for their home. Street had four children. He had one son, Richard Street Jr., from his marriage to Gill and had three children from additional relationships: Brandi Chapman, Januari Street, and Brandon Street. Richard Street was married to Cynthia Ramirez Street when he died. They were married for 7 years.

At the time of his death, Street was completing his autobiography, Ball of Confusion (referring to the Temptations song "Ball of Confusion (That's What the World is Today)", which Street did not appear on as he joined The Temptations in 1971, the year after it was released). Completed by his co-author, Gary Flanigan, Ball of Confusion: My Life as a Temptin' Temptation was published in 2014. It is the second autobiographical account of The Temptations, the first being Otis Williams' Temptations book from 1988.

== Death ==
Richard Street died on February 27, 2013, at the St. Rose Dominican Hospital in Las Vegas, Nevada of a pulmonary embolism. His death occurred nine days after fellow former Temptation Damon Harris's death. His widow, Cynthia Street, has said that “He was really fighting for his life.” A public viewing was held in the evening March 15 at the church at Forest Lawn in Cypress California. Funeral services were held the next day at Forest Lawn. He is buried at Forest Lawn Memorial Park Cemetery, Cypress, Orange County, California.

== See also ==
- Thelma Records
