= List of the Temptations band members =

This page is a chronology of the Motown singing group the Temptations. It lists the members of the group during all phases of the group's history. While the Temptations have frequently changed their lineup, the group has always employed a person for each of the following roles:

- main lead singer (e.g., David Ruffin)
- secondary lead and baritone singer (e.g., Paul Williams)
- first tenor lead singer (e.g., Eddie Kendricks)
- bass lead singer (e.g., Melvin Franklin)
- background second tenor and baritone w/ occasional lead (since 1961 Otis Williams has always held and continues to hold this role)

During their live performances, the 1st tenor who almost exclusively performs in falsetto and secondary leads have always been as predominant on stage as the group's official main lead/front man. Also, the 1st tenor position is always considered equal to the main lead position on studio recordings as well; the secondary lead was elevated to almost the same status in the studio from 1968 to 1972 and from 1993 onward.

The background/occasional lead role was originally that of another secondary lead singer before 1961.

The group has performed as a quintet throughout its history, with six exceptions:

- The Cavaliers' lineup (1955–57, four members)
- The Primes' lineup (1958–60, first four then three members)
- April–May 1971 (four members)
- The 1982 reunion lineup (seven members)
- The later half of 1995, following the departure of Ray Davis (four members, no bass)
- October 2019 to June 2020 following the departure of Larry Braggs (four members)

Since 1976, the name "the Temptations" has been a registered trademark owned by Otis Williams and (the estate of) Melvin Franklin.

== The Cavaliers ==
The Cavaliers lineup
1955–1957	Kell Osborne – tenor; Eddie Kendricks – tenor; Paul Williams – baritone; Wiley Waller – bass

== The Primes ==
The Primes lineups
1957–1958	Kell Osborne – tenor; Eddie Kendricks – tenor; Paul Williams – baritone
1958–1960	Kell Osborne – tenor; Eddie Kendricks – tenor; Paul Williams – baritone

== Otis Williams & the Siberians, also the El Domingoes ==
The Siberians/The El Domingoes lineups
1955–1957	Elbridge "Al" Bryant – tenor; Otis Williams – baritone; James "Pee-Wee" Crawford – tenor; Vernard Plain – second tenor; Arthur Walton – bass
1957–1960	Elbridge "Al" Bryant – tenor; Otis Williams – baritone; James "Pee-Wee" Crawford – tenor; Richard Street – second tenor; Melvin Franklin – bass

== The Distants ==
The Distants lineups
1959	Elbridge "Al" Bryant – tenor; Otis Williams – baritone; James "Pee-Wee" Crawford – tenor; Richard Street – second tenor; Melvin Franklin – bass
1959–1960	Elbridge "Al" Bryant – tenor; Otis Williams – baritone; Albert "Mooch" Harrell – tenor; Richard Street – second tenor; Melvin Franklin – bass

== The Elgins ==
The Elgins lineup
1960–1961	Elbridge "Al" Bryant – second tenor; Otis Williams – baritone; Eddie Kendricks – tenor; Paul Williams – lead baritone; Melvin Franklin – bass

== The Temptations ==
- Members of the classic lineup are in **bold**.

The Temptations lineups
1960–1963	Elbridge "Al" Bryant – second tenor; **Otis Williams** – baritone; **Eddie Kendricks** – tenor; **Paul Williams** – lead baritone; **Melvin Franklin** – bass
1964–1968	**David Ruffin** – lead baritenor; **Otis Williams** – second tenor; **Eddie Kendricks** – tenor; **Paul Williams** – baritone; **Melvin Franklin** – bass
1968–1971	Dennis Edwards – lead baritenor; **Otis Williams** – second tenor; **Eddie Kendricks** – tenor; **Paul Williams** – baritone; **Melvin Franklin** – bass
1971	Dennis Edwards – lead baritenor; **Otis Williams** – second tenor; **Paul Williams** – baritone; **Melvin Franklin** – bass
1971	Dennis Edwards – lead baritenor; **Otis Williams** – second tenor; Ricky Owens – tenor; **Paul Williams** – baritone; **Melvin Franklin** – bass
1971	Dennis Edwards – lead baritenor; **Otis Williams** – second tenor; Ricky Owens – tenor; Richard Street – third tenor; **Melvin Franklin** – bass
1971–1975	Dennis Edwards – lead baritenor; **Otis Williams** – baritone/second tenor; Damon Harris – tenor; Richard Street – second tenor/third tenor; **Melvin Franklin** – bass
1975–1977 1980–1982 1982–1983	Dennis Edwards – lead baritenor; **Otis Williams** – baritone; Glenn Leonard – tenor; Richard Street – second tenor; **Melvin Franklin** – bass
1977–1980	Louis Price – lead baritone; **Otis Williams** – baritone; Glenn Leonard – tenor; Richard Street – second tenor; **Melvin Franklin** – bass
1982	**David Ruffin** – lead baritenor; Dennis Edwards – lead baritenor; **Otis Williams** – baritone; **Eddie Kendricks** – tenor; Glenn Leonard – tenor; Richard Street – second tenor; **Melvin Franklin** – bass
1983–1984 1987–1989	Dennis Edwards – lead baritenor; **Otis Williams** – baritone; Ron Tyson – tenor; Richard Street – second tenor; **Melvin Franklin** – bass
1984–1987 1989–1992	Ali-Ollie Woodson – lead tenor; **Otis Williams** – baritone; Ron Tyson – tenor; Richard Street – second tenor; **Melvin Franklin** – bass
1992–1994	Ali-Ollie Woodson – lead tenor; **Otis Williams** – baritone; Ron Tyson – tenor; Theo Peoples – second tenor; **Melvin Franklin** – bass
1995	Ali-Ollie Woodson – lead tenor; **Otis Williams** – baritone; Ron Tyson – tenor; Theo Peoples – second tenor; Ray Davis – bass
1996–1997	Ali-Ollie Woodson – lead tenor; **Otis Williams** – baritone; Ron Tyson – tenor; Theo Peoples – second tenor; Harry McGilberry – bass
1997–1998	Terry Weeks – second tenor; **Otis Williams** – baritone; Ron Tyson – tenor; Theo Peoples – lead baritone; Harry McGilberry – bass
1998–2003	Terry Weeks – second tenor; **Otis Williams** – baritone; Ron Tyson – tenor; Barrington "Bo" Henderson – lead tenor; Harry McGilberry – bass
2003	Terry Weeks – second tenor; **Otis Williams** – baritone; Ron Tyson – tenor; G. C. Cameron – lead baritenor; Harry McGilberry – bass
2003–2007	Terry Weeks – second tenor; **Otis Williams** – baritone; Ron Tyson – tenor; G. C. Cameron – lead baritenor; Joe Herndon – bass
2007–2015	Terry Weeks – second tenor; **Otis Williams** – baritone; Ron Tyson – tenor; Bruce Williamson – lead baritenor; Joe Herndon – bass
2016–2019	Terry Weeks – second tenor; **Otis Williams** – baritone; Ron Tyson – tenor; Larry Braggs – lead tenor; Willie Greene – bass
2019–2020	Terry Weeks — second tenor; **Otis Williams** – baritone; Ron Tyson – tenor; Willie Greene – bass
2020–2021	Terry Weeks – second tenor; **Otis Williams** – baritone; Ron Tyson – tenor; Mario Corbino – lead tenor; Willie Greene – bass
2021–2022	Terry Weeks – second tenor; **Otis Williams** – baritone; Ron Tyson – tenor; Tony Grant – lead tenor; Willie Greene – bass
2022–present	Terry Weeks – second tenor; **Otis Williams** – baritone; Ron Tyson – tenor; Tony Grant – lead tenor; Jawan M. Jackson – bass
