= Awesome (The Temptations album) =

Studio album by The Temptations
- Released: November 20, 2001
- Recorded: 2001
- Genre: R&B
- Length: 56:41
- Label: Motown
- Producers: Narada Michael Walden, Mechalie Jamison, Andy Cramer, Arthur Marbury, Otis Williams, Dennis Nelson, Alonzo McKenzie, Oji Pierce, Nat Adderley Jr., Stanley Brown

The Temptations chronology
Ear-Resistible (1999)	Awesome (2001)	Legacy (2004)

Awesome is a 2001 album by the Temptations. Despite many changes in personnel, the album became their 45th to reach the Billboard 200, the first being Meet the Temptations in 1964. The lone single "4 Days" peaked at #19 on the Urban Adult Contemporary Charts.

It is the last album to featured Barrington “Bo” Henderson and Harry McGilberry before they were fired from the group in 2003.

== Critical reception ==
Professional ratings
Review scores
Source	Rating
AllMusic	3/5 stars
USA Today	3/4 stars

According to Jason Birchmeier of AllMusic, Awesome contains "mostly ballads here and some innocent concessions to the hip-hop audience." The sound is similar to the group's surprisingly successful predecessor, Ear-Resistible, although "less rewarding", but it is still "the Temptations sounding like the Temptations."

== Track listing ==
All tracks executive produced by Kedar Massenburg and Otis Williams,

No.	Title	Writer(s)	Lead singer(s)	Length
1.	"Awesome Intro"	Narada Michael Walden, Otis Williams, Sunny Hilden	Terry Weeks, Ron Tyson, Barrington "Bo" Henderson, Williams	0:58
2.	"Hurt So Bad"	Andy Cramer, Mechalie Jamison, Jerry Tawney	Henderson, Tyson	3:56
3.	"4 Days"	Jasher	Weeks	4:07
4.	"Lady"	Sandra St. Victor, Tom Hammer	Weeks, Henderson, Tyson	4:49
5.	"Forget About It"	Christopher Grant, Jasher	Henderson	4:23
6.	"Awesome"	Narada Michael Walden, Otis Williams, Sunny Hilden	Henderson, Weeks, Tyson, Harry McGilberry, Williams (spoken word)	3:39
7.	"Race for Your Heart"	Dennis Nelson, Otis Williams, William Rivera	Henderson, Weeks	4:22
8.	"Swept Away"	Alonzo Jones, Jeff Porter, Narada Michael Walden, Robin Taylor Brooks	Tyson	4:47
9.	"My Baby""	Henderson, Carsten Lindberg, Joachim Svare	Henderson	4:20
10.	"Open Letter, My One Temptation Interlude"	Alonzo McKenzie, Ron Tyson	Tyson, McGilberry	1:05
11.	"So Easy"	Oji Pierce, Ron Tyson	Tyson, Henderson, Williams (spoken word)	5:44
12.	"A Love I Can See""	William Robinson	Weeks, Henderson, Tyson, Williams (spoken word) (on sample from original recording: Paul Williams)	5:46
13.	"That's How Heartaches Are Made"	Ben Raleigh, Bob Halley	Weeks, McGilberry (spoken word)	4:46
14.	"I Feel Good"	Stanley Brown	Henderson, Tyson	4:05

== Personnel ==
The Temptations

- Terry Weeks – second tenor vocals
- Barrington "Bo" Henderson – tenor vocals
- Otis Williams – baritone vocals
- Ron Tyson – tenor/falsetto vocals
- Harry McGilberry – bass vocals

== Charts ==
Chart performance for Awesome
Chart (2001)	Peak position
US Billboard 200	140
US Top R&B/Hip-Hop Albums (Billboard)	27
