= Legacy (The Temptations album) =

Studio album by The Temptations
- Released: 8 June 2004
- Recorded: 2004
- Genre: R&B
- Length: 57:31
- Label: Motown
- Producers: Daniel Weatherspoon, Balewa Muhammad

The Temptations chronology
Awesome (2001)	Legacy (2004)	Reflections (2006)

Legacy is a 2004 album by The Temptations for the Motown label, introducing new Temptations G.C. Cameron and Joe Herndon. The album was the group's final release on Motown; they left the label shortly after its release. "Somethin' Special" was a Top 40 hit on the Urban Adult Contemporary Charts peaking at #25. The cover photograph was taken by Aaron Rapoport.

== Track listing ==
No.	Title	Writer(s)	Lead singer(s)	Length
1.	"Still Temptin'"	Balewa Muhammad, Frank Oliphant, Steve Harvey, Thomas Olivera	Otis Williams (spoken word), Terry Weeks, G.C. Cameron, Ron Tyson	4:35
2.	"Round Here"	Muhammad, Bobby Watson, Clifton Lighty, Oliphant, Harvey	Cameron, Weeks	4:00
3.	"Stay Together"	Andrew Ramsey, Eric Benét, Shannon Sanders	Weeks, Cameron, Tyson, Joe Herndon	4:29
4.	"Somethin' Special"	Brian Winsley, Dinky Bingham, Joel Kipnis, LaMenga Kafi	Herndon (spoken word), Weeks, Tyson, Cameron	4:46
5.	"Fifty Fifty Love"	Carlton Grant, Dave Evans, Steve Lindsey	Weeks, Cameron	3:43
6.	"Love To The Music"	Daniel Weatherspoon	Tyson, Cameron	4:49
7.	"You Are Necessary In My Life (The Wedding Song)"	Benjamin Wright, Otis Williams	Cameron, Herndon (spoken word)	6:36
8.	"Mr. Fix It"	Muhammad, Oliphant, Mary Brown, Harvey	Herndon (spoken word), Weeks, Cameron	4:47
9.	"All The Wrong People"	Muhammad, Watson, Oliphant, Brown, Harvey	Weeks, Cameron	4:46
10.	"Baby It's Me"	Grant, Evans, Lindsey	Cameron, Weeks	5:18
11.	"Why Can't We Be Lovin' Friends"	Ali-Ollie Woodson, Williams	Cameron, Danesha Simon	5:54
12.	"Never Let You Down"	Arlene Britt, Johnny Britt	Weeks, Herndon	3:49

== Personnel ==
The Temptations

- G.C. Cameron – tenor/baritone vocals
- Terry Weeks – second tenor vocals
- Otis Williams – baritone vocals
- Ron Tyson – first tenor/falsetto vocals
- Joe Herndon – bass vocals

== Reception ==
Professional ratings
Review scores
Source	Rating
Allmusic	3/5 stars
