= Phoenix Rising (The Temptations album) =

Studio album by the Temptations
- Released: August 18, 1998
- Genre: R&B
- Length: 57:10
- Label: Motown
- Producers: Isaias Gamboa; Ronnie Garrett; Arthur "Buster" Marbury; Rex Rideout; Narada Michael Walden

The Temptations chronology
For Lovers Only (1995)	Phoenix Rising (1998)	Ear-Resistible (2000)

Phoenix Rising is a 1998 studio album by American vocal group The Temptations. It was released on the Motown label on August 18, 1998. Featuring the debut of new Temptations members Barrington "Bo" Henderson, Terry Weeks, and Harry McGilberry, following the departure of Ali-Ollie Woodson, who ended his tenure with the group (following the release of the 1995 album For Lovers Only); as well as the final Temptations album for Theo Peoples, who Henderson replaced.

The album, the Temptations' first million-selling album in over twenty years, features the hit single "Stay" Although not commercially released as a single, "Stay" became a top 30 hit on the US Hot R&B/Hip-Hop Songs chart, peaking at number 28. It also peaked at number one on the Urban Adult Contemporary charts and nominated for Best R&B Performance By A Duo Or Group With Vocal at the 1998 Grammy awards. Later singles "This Is My Promise" and "How Could He Hurt You" became top five hits respectively on the latter chart as well. Phoenix Rising was certified Platinum by the Recording Industry Association of America (RIAA) on November 15, 1999.

== Critical reception ==
Professional ratings
Review scores
Source	Rating
AllMusic	3/5 stars

AllMusic editor Andrew Hamilton wrote that "Temptations' albums used to feature a baritone voice distinct from the tenor not only in register, but in style and phrasing; here the voices are too similar. Still, not a bad silver platter when you take the personnel changes into consideration."

== Commercial performance ==
Phoenix Rising became the band's first studio album to receive a platinum certification from the Recording Industry Association of America (RIAA).

== Track listing ==
Phoenix Rising track listing
No.	Title	Writer(s)	Lead singer(s)	Length
1.	"Here After" (Interlude)	Benjamin Wright; Otis Williams	Williams (spoken word)	0:44
2.	"Stay"	James Fischer; Narada Michael Walden; Ronald White; Scott Urguhart; William Robinson	Theo Peoples; Ron Tyson; Terry Weeks; Harry McGilberry; Williams (spoken word)	4:46
3.	"False Faces"	Arthur "Buster" Marbury	Weeks	5:31
4.	"How Could He Hurt You"	Darcy Aldridge; Rex Rideout; Ronnie Garrett; Tony Kurtis	Barrington "Bo" Henderson	4:52
5.	"I'm Calling You" (Interlude)	Williams; Theo Peoples	Williams (spoken word)	1:26
6.	"This Is My Promise"	Peoples	Peoples; McGilberry	7:20
7.	"My Love"	Darin McKinney; Walden; Robin Taylor Brooks; Rodney Alejandro; Ron Tyson	Weeks; Tyson, McGilberry	4:20
8.	"Tempt Me"	McKinney; Walden; Brooks; Alejandro	Williams (spoken word); Tyson	5:06
9.	"If I Give You My Heart"	Walden; Sunny Hilden	Peoples, Weeks, Tyson, Williams (spoken word	4:35
10.	"Take Me in Your Arms"	Johnny Britt; Williams	Weeks	3:58
11.	"That's What Friends Are For"	Marbury; Melvin Jordan; Williams; Weeks	Weeks	5:51
12.	"Just Like I Told You"	Gamboa	Weeks	4:47
13.	"Stay" (Remix)	Fischer; Walden; White; Urguhart; Robinson	Peoples; Tyson; Weeks; McGilberry; Williams (spoken word	4:03

Notes

- ^{^a} denotes additional producer(s)

== Personnel ==
The Temptations

- Terry Weeks - tenor/baritone vocals
- Barrington "Bo" Henderson - tenor vocals only on "How Could He Hurt You"
- Theo Peoples - second tenor/baritone vocals; all except “How Could He Hurt You?”
- Otis Williams - second tenor/baritone vocals
- Ron Tyson - first tenor/falsetto vocals
- Harry McGilberry - bass vocals

== Charts ==
=== Weekly charts ===
Weekly chart performance for Phoenix Rising
Chart (1998)	Peak position
US Billboard 200	44
US Top R&B/Hip-Hop Albums (Billboard)	8

=== Year-end charts ===
Year-end chart performance for Phoenix Rising
Chart (1998)	Position
US Top R&B/Hip-Hop Albums (Billboard)	52
Chart (1999)	Position
US Billboard 200	179
US Top R&B/Hip-Hop Albums (Billboard)	40

== Certifications ==
Certifications for Phoenix Rising
Region	Certification	Certified units/sales
United States (RIAA)	Platinum	1,000,000^{^}
^{^} Shipments figures based on certification alone.
