= Ear-Resistible =

Studio album by The Temptations
- Released: May 16, 2000
- Length: 57:10
- Label: Motown
- Producers: Stanley Brown; Quincy Patrick; Calvin Gaines; Isaias Gamboa; Joe; Gerald Levert; Joe N Little III; Arthur "Buster" Marbury; Dennis Nelson; Narada Michael Walden

The Temptations chronology
Phoenix Rising (1998)	Ear-Resistible (2000)	Awesome (2001)

Ear-Resistible is a studio album by American vocal group the Temptations. Served as the follow-up to Phoenix Rising (1998), it was released by Motown on May 16, 2000. Featuring the Top 20 Urban Adult Contemporary singles "I'm Here", which peaked at #3, and "Selfish Reasons", which peaked at #18, the album won the 2001 Grammy Award for Best Traditional R&B Performance.

== Critical reception ==
Professional ratings
Review scores
Source	Rating
Allmusic	4/5 stars
USA Today	3/4 stars

AllMusic editor Jason Elias found that with the album "the group turns in its strongest set since 1984's Truly for You [...] Co-executive produced by Kedar Massenburg and Otis Williams, Ear-Resistible proves that you don't need rap cameos or expletives to make a great R&B album."

== Track listing ==
Ear-Resistible track listing
No.	Title	Writer(s)	Lead singer(s)	Length
1.	"I'll Just Go Crazy – Intro"	ALonzo McKenzie, Arthur Marbury III, Felicia Brown-Spencer, Melvin Jordan, Otis Williams, Weeks	Terry Weeks	0:32
2.	"I'm Here"	Katrina Willis, Colin Morrison	Weeks	3:20
3.	"Your Love"	Stanley Brown	Weeks, Williams (spoken word)	4:47
4.	"Elevator Eyes"	Williams, Dennis Nelson	Weeks, Barrington "Bo" Henderson	3:51
5.	"Selfish Reasons"	Gerald LeVert, Joe N Little III	Weeks, Ron Tyson	4:48
6.	"Kiss Me Like You Miss Me"	Narada Michael Walden, Robin Taylor Brooks, Williams	Williams (spoken word), Henderson, Tyson, Harry McGilberry Weeks	4:40
7.	"Party"	Walden, Tyson, Sunny Hilden	McGilberry, Henderson, Tyson Weeks, Williams	4:06
8.	"It's Alright to Be Wrong"	Calvin Gaines, Joshua Thompson, Donell Jones, Quincy Patrick	Henderson, Tyson	4:21
9.	"Proven & True"	LeVert, R. Kelly	Tyson, Henderson	5:27
10.	"Got to Get on the Road"	Trevor Lawrence, Isaias Gamboa, Williams	Williams (spoken word), Tyson, Weeks	4:53
11.	"I'll Just Go Crazy"	Marbury, Weeks, Alonzo McKenzie, Jordan, Brown-Spencer	Weeks	4:32
12.	"A Little Bit Lonely"	DeVere Duckett, Keith Rouster	Henderson	4:30
13.	"One Love, One World – Interlude"	Marbury, Weeks, Williams	Group	1:38
14.	"Error of Our Ways"	Nelson	Weeks	5:18

== Personnel ==
- Terry Weeks – second tenor vocals
- Barrington "Bo" Henderson – tenor vocals
- Otis Williams – baritone vocals
- Ron Tyson – first tenor/falsetto vocals
- Harry McGilberry – bass vocals

== Charts ==
Chart performance for Ear-Resistible
Chart (2000)	Peak position
US Billboard 200	54
US Top R&B/Hip-Hop Albums (Billboard)	16
