= Walk Hard: The Dewey Cox Story =

2007 US comedy film by Jake Kasdan

- Promotional poster
- Directed by: Jake Kasdan
- Written by: Judd Apatow; Jake Kasdan
- Produced by: Judd Apatow; Hunter Baumann; Clayton Townsend
- Starring: John C. Reilly; Tim Meadows; Kristen Wiig; Jenna Fischer
- Cinematography: Uta Briesewitz
- Edited by: Tara Timpone; Steve Welch
- Music by: Michael Andrews
- Production companies: Columbia Pictures; Relativity Media; Apatow Productions
- Distributed by: Sony Pictures Releasing
- Release date: December 21, 2007
- Running time: 96 minutes
- Country: United States
- Language: English
- Budget: $35 million
- Box office: $20.6 million

Walk Hard: The Dewey Cox Story is a 2007 American musical comedy film directed by Jake Kasdan, and written by Kasdan and co-producer Judd Apatow. It stars John C. Reilly, Kristen Wiig, Tim Meadows and Jenna Fischer. A parody of the biopic genre, Walk Hard is the story of a fictional country, rock and roll and folk music star played by Reilly.

Walk Hard primarily references the musical biopics Ray (2004) and Walk the Line (2005); in addition to Ray Charles and Johnny Cash, the "Dewey Cox" character includes elements of the lives and careers of other notable musicians including Roy Orbison, Glen Campbell, Bob Dylan, Jerry Lee Lewis, Donovan, John Lennon, James Brown, Jim Morrison, Conway Twitty, Neil Diamond, Hank Williams, Sonny & Cher and Brian Wilson. The film portrays fictional versions of artists Buddy Holly, the Big Bopper, Elvis Presley, and the Beatles; some artists appear as themselves, including Eddie Vedder, Jewel, The Temptations and Ghostface Killah. In addition, the film parodies or pays tribute to the musical styles of David Bowie, Billy Joel, Van Dyke Parks, the Gun Club, and seventies punk rock.

The film was released in North America on December 21, 2007 by Sony Pictures Releasing. It received positive critical reviews, but was a box office disappointment, grossing $20.6 million against a $35 million budget. It has since become a cult film. For his performance, Reilly was nominated for the Golden Globe Award for Best Actor in a Motion Picture – Musical or Comedy.

== Plot ==
In Springberry, Alabama, 1946, young Dewey Cox accidentally cuts his brother Nate in half with a machete. His father blames him for Nate's death and the trauma causes him to lose his sense of smell. Dewey meets a blues guitarist who discovers his life experience instilled in him a natural affinity for playing blues.

In 1953, Dewey performs at a school talent show and drives the crowd wild with his song "Take My Hand", and his father kicks him out of the house, calling it the "Devil's music". A 14-year-old Dewey leaves Springberry with his 12-year-old-girlfriend Edith; they soon marry and have a baby.

Working at an all-African American nightclub, Dewey replaces singer Bobby Shad onstage and impresses Jewish record executive L'Chaim. While recording a rockabilly rendition of "That's Amore", he is berated by an executive. A desperate Dewey performs "Walk Hard", a song inspired by a speech he gave Edith, which restores the executive's religious faith and rockets him to superstardom.

The song quickly becomes a hit and Dewey becomes caught up in the rock 'n' roll lifestyle. He soon performs his first concert as the following act to Elvis Presley, Buddy Holly, and The Big Bopper. Dewey is introduced to marijuana by his reluctant drummer Sam and becomes unfaithful to Edith. Dewey's father informs him that his mother has died while dancing to Dewey's song and blames Dewey's music for her death.

Distraught, Dewey finds Sam using cocaine and partakes, resulting in a cocaine-fueled punk rock performance. Choir-girl Darlene enters Dewey's life, and he produces several sexually suggestive hit records amid their courtship. He weds Darlene while still married to Edith, which leads to both women leaving him, after which Dewey purchases drugs from an undercover cop. After he serves time in prison and in rehab, Darlene returns.

They move to Berkeley, California in 1966 during the counterculture movement. Dewey's new singing style is compared to that of Bob Dylan, which he angrily denies despite his new songs and style clearly imitating Dylan’s. On a band visit to India, Dewey takes LSD with the Beatles, leading to a Yellow Submarine-esque hallucination.

Dewey becomes consumed with creating his masterpiece Black Sheep (a homage to Brian Wilson's Smile). The band resents his insane musical style and abusive behavior and breaks up; Darlene, also unable to deal with him, leaves him for Glen Campbell. During another stint in rehab, Dewey is visited by the ghost of Nate, who ridicules his self-pity and tells him to start writing songs again.

In 1976, Dewey now hosts a CBS variety television show but is unable to compose a masterpiece for his brother. At Nate's urging, Dewey attempts to reconcile with his father. However, his father reveals that he has spent years training with a machete to murder Dewey and forces him to duel, but accidentally cuts himself in half. Before dying, he forgives Dewey for Nate's death and tells him to be a better father. Dewey breaks down and destroys almost everything in his home.

Dewey is approached by one of his sons and decides to reconnect with his dozens of children. In 1992, a divorced Darlene returns to him. Finally realizing what is most important, Dewey regains his sense of smell and remarries her.

In 2007, L'Chaim's son Dreidel informs Dewey of his popularity with young listeners through rapper Lil' Nutzzak's sampling of "Walk Hard". Dewey learns he is to receive a lifetime achievement award. They want him to sing a song at the ceremony, but Dewey is reluctant, fearing his old temptations. However, with his family's support, he reunites with his band and is finally able to create one great masterpiece, summing up his entire life with his final song, "Beautiful Ride", while also deciding against trying a drug, viagra offered to him by Sam.

A title card reveals that Dewey died three minutes after this final performance, which then also reads "Dewford Randolph Cox, 1936–2007". A post-credits scene is a short black-and-white clip of "the actual Dewey Cox, April 16, 2002" (still played by Reilly).

== Cast ==
- John C. Reilly as Dewey Cox
  - Conner Rayburn as Young Dewey
- Kristen Wiig as Edith Cox
- Raymond J. Barry as Pa Cox
- Margo Martindale as Ma Cox
- Jenna Fischer as Darlene Madison Cox
  - Angela Correa as Darlene’s singing voice
- Tim Meadows as Sam McPherson, drummer and drug dealer
- Chris Parnell as Theo
- Matt Besser as Dave
- Chip Hormess as Nate Cox, Dewey's brother
  - Jonah Hill (uncredited) as older Nate
- David "Honeyboy" Edwards as the Old Blues Singer
- David Krumholtz as Schwartzberg
- Craig Robinson as Bobby Shad
- Harold Ramis as Kvetch L'Chaim
- Simon Helberg as Dreidel L'Chaim
- Philip Rosenthal as Mazeltov
- Martin Starr as Schmendrick
- John Michael Higgins as "Walk Hard" recording engineer
- Ed Helms as Stage manager
- Jane Lynch as Gail, the news reporter
- Angela Little Mackenzie as Beth Anne
- Skyler Gisondo as Dewford "Dewdrop/Dewey" Cox Jr.
- Lurie Poston as a Cox kid
- Jack McBrayer as DJ
- Nat Faxon as Awards show stage manager
- Rance Howard as Preacher
- Odette Yustman as Reefer girl
- Frankie Muniz as Buddy Holly
- John Ennis as The Big Bopper
- Jack White as Elvis Presley
- Adam Herschman as Jerry Garcia
- The Temptations (Otis Williams, Ron Tyson, Terry Weeks, Joe Herndon, Bruce Williamson) as themselves
- Eddie Vedder as himself
- Jackson Browne as himself
- Jewel as herself
- Ghostface Killah as himself
- Lyle Lovett as himself
- Gerry Bednob as Maharishi Mahesh Yogi
- Cheryl Tiegs (unrated version) as herself
- Paul Rudd, Jack Black, Justin Long and Jason Schwartzman (uncredited) as The Beatles (John Lennon, Paul McCartney, George Harrison and Ringo Starr, respectively)
- Patrick Duffy (unrated version, uncredited) as himself
- Morgan Fairchild (unrated version, uncredited) as herself
- Cheryl Ladd (unrated version, uncredited) as herself
- Don Was (uncredited) as himself (bass player behind Jackson Browne, Jewel and Lyle Lovett)

== Production and development ==
I just had this idea to do a fake biopic—or a real biopic about a fake person—and follow a musician's career trajectory.

— Jake Kasdan, 2007

Jake Kasdan brought the idea to his friend and fellow director Judd Apatow. They then began writing the film together. The tongue-in-cheek references in this fake biopic were drawn from various sources. Apatow and Kasdan noted that they watched various types of biopics for inspiration, including those of Jimi Hendrix and Marilyn Monroe. Despite the humorous approach, the film was crafted in the serious tone of films earmarked for an Oscar, adding to the irony.

John C. Reilly, who actually sings and plays guitar, was chosen to play the title role. "We took the clichés of movie biopics and just had fun with them," Reilly said. The "deliberate miscasting" of celebrity cameos, such as Elvis Presley and the Beatles, was intended to enhance the comedy. The film's poster is a reference to the "young lion" photos of Jim Morrison. The film was shot on the Panavision Genesis.

== Reception ==
On Rotten Tomatoes, the film has an approval rating of 75% based on 138 reviews, with an average rating of 6.6/10. The site's consensus states: "A parody that pokes fun at rock stars and reductive biopics alike, this comedy sings in large part because of stellar performances and clever original music." On Metacritic the film has a score of 63 out of 100 based on reviews from 32 critics. Audiences polled by CinemaScore gave the film an average grade of "B−" on an A+ to F scale.

Roger Ebert scored the film three out of four and wrote: "Instead of sending everything over the top at high energy, like Top Secret! or Airplane!, they allow Reilly to more or less actually play the character, so that, against all expectations, some scenes actually approach real sentiment." Peter Travers of Rolling Stone magazine wrote: "The tricky thing about parody movies is that the jokes get old fast and they're hit-and-miss. Walk Hard, a spoof of every musical biopic from Ray to Walk the Line, is guilty on both counts. How lucky that when the jokes do hit, they kick major ass." A 2022 review of the best comedy films of the 21st century placed this at sixth.

The film was commercially unsuccessful, taking $18 million at the US box office which was less than the film's $35 million budget.

John C. Reilly received a Golden Globe nomination for Best Performance in a Musical or Comedy and a nomination for Best Original Song.

== Home media ==
The film was released on DVD and Blu-ray on April 8, 2008. In the opening weekend, 263,001 DVD units were sold, generating revenue of $5,110,109. As of May 2010, DVD sales had gathered revenue of $15,664,735.

== Promotional appearances ==
Along with a backing band "The Hardwalkers", Reilly made seven musical appearances as Dewey Cox in the weeks prior to the film's release date.

- December 5, 2007 – Rock & Roll Hall of Fame (Cleveland, OH)
- December 6, 2007 – The Cubby Bear (Chicago, IL)
- December 7, 2007 – Stubb's BBQ (Austin, TX)
- December 8, 2007 – Mercy Lounge (Nashville, TN)
- December 10, 2007 – Great American Music Hall (San Francisco, CA)
- December 11, 2007 – The Blacksheep (Colorado Springs, CO)
- December 13, 2007 – Guitar Center on Sunset Blvd. (Los Angeles, CA)
- December 19, 2007 – Knitting Factory (New York, NY)
- December 19, 2007 – Performed in the character of Dewey Cox on Good Morning America.

Several fake commercials were aired including one with John Mayer, hinting Dewey might be his father.

== Soundtrack ==
Singer-songwriters Dan Bern and Mike Viola (of the Candy Butchers) wrote most of the film's songs, including "There's a Change a Happenin'", "The Mulatto Song", "A Life Without You (Is No Life at All)", "Beautiful Ride" and "Hole in My Pants". Charlie Wadhams and Benji Hughes wrote the song "Let's Duet". Marshall Crenshaw wrote the title song, and Van Dyke Parks penned the Brian Wilson-esque 1960s-styled psychedelic jam "Black Sheep" (the recording session seems to be a specific parody of Wilson's Smile album sessions, on which Van Dyke Parks worked). Antonio Ortiz wrote "Take My Hand". A number of critics noted the unusually high quality of many of the individual songs on the soundtrack, how well they reflected the styles and times they were attempting to parody, and how well they stood on their own as quality compositions. The soundtrack was nominated for both a Grammy and Golden Globe Award and was nominated and won the Sierra Award for Best Song in a Motion Picture from the Las Vegas Film Critics Society. John C. Reilly sang on all the tracks and played guitar on most of them.
