= Still Here (The Temptations album) =

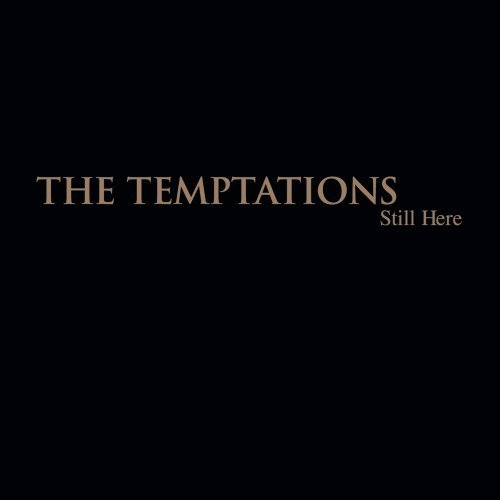

Studio album by The Temptations
- Released: May 4, 2010
- Studio: Billy Meadows Studios, Los Angeles, California, United States; Entourage Studios, Los Angeles, California, United States; Top Secret Productions, Birmingham, Alabama, United States
- Genre: Soul
- Length: 57:15
- Language: English
- Label: UMe
- Producer: Johnny Britt; Keith Ferguson; Michael Panepento; Otis Williams; James Yerby

The Temptations chronology
Back to Front (2007)	Still Here (2010)	All the Time (2018)

Still Here is a 2010 studio album by American soul group The Temptations. It is the 49th studio album from The Temptations and features a mix of their classic soul music vocals with some hip hop production and rapping.

Odeen Mays did the actual bass vocals in Joe Herndon’s place.

== Reception ==
Editors of AllMusic Guide scored this album three out of five stars, with reviewer Andy Kellman critiquing that "the group’s handful of attempts to relate to younger listeners fall flat" and the use of Auto-Tune, but tempering his criticism with praise of the vocals and noting that the "album is heavy on laid-back love songs that are easy to enjoy, if occasionally on the tepid side".

== Track listing ==
1. "Still Here (Prelude)" (Johnny Britt and Otis Williams) – 0:30
2. "Change Has Come" (Shaun Pezant and James Yerby) – 3:21
3. "One of a Kind Lady" (Britt and Williams) – 4:18
4. "Let Me Catch Your Diamonds" (Britt and Williams) – 3:53
5. "Hold Me" (Britt and Williams) – 5:03
6. "Warm Summer Nights" (Pezant, J. Yerby, and Maxine Yerby) – 5:49
7. "First Kiss" (Pezant and J. Yerby) – 4:13
8. "Shawtyismygirlooyeah" (Keith Ferguson) – 5:12
9. "Still Here with Me" (Pezant, J. Yerby, and M. Yerby) – 4:15
10. "Soul Music" (Pezant and J. Yerby) – 4:26
11. "Woman" (Pezant and J. Yerby) – 5:30
12. "Listen Up" (Pezant, J. Yerby, and M. Yerby) – 6:05
13. "Going Back Home" (Pezant and J. Yerby) – 4:04
14. "Still Here (Reprise)" (Britt and Williams) – 0:34

== Personnel ==
The Temptations

- Ron Tyson – first tenor/falsetto vocals
- Terry Weeks – second tenor vocals
- Otis Williams – baritone vocals; vocal arrangement on "Let Me Catch Your Diamonds" and "Hold Me"; mixing; production on "Still Here (Prelude)", "One of a Kind Lady", "Let Me Catch Your Diamonds", "Hold Me", "Shawtyismygirlooyeah", and "Still Here (Reprise)"; executive production
- Bruce Williamson – baritenor vocals
- Odeen Mays – bass vocals

Additional musicians

- Melvin Baldwin – drums on "First Kiss"
- Johnny Britt – flugelhorn on "One of a Kind Lady", "Let Me Catch Your Diamonds", and "Hold Me"; keyboards on "Still Here (Prelude)"; instrumentation on "One of a Kind Lady" and "Hold Me"; mixing; production on "Still Here (Prelude)", "One of a Kind Lady", "Let Me Catch Your Diamonds", "Hold Me", and "Still Here (Reprise)"; programming on "One of a Kind Lady", "Let Me Catch Your Diamonds", and "Hold Me"; trumpet on "One of a Kind Lady", "Let Me Catch Your Diamonds", and "Hold Me"; vocal arrangement on "One of a Kind Lady", "Hold Me", and "Still Here (Reprise)"; orchestration on "Still Here (Reprise)"
- Bobby English – alto saxophone on "One of a Kind Lady" and "Let Me Catch Your Diamonds"; tenor saxophone on "One of a Kind Lady", "Let Me Catch Your Diamonds", and "Hold Me"; flute on "Hold Me"
- Gregg "Greco" Freeman – percussion on "Shawtyismygirlooyeah"
- Damon Johnson – guitar on "Change Has Come" and "Listen Up"
- Marques Johnson – rapping on "Change Has Come"
- Norris Jones – guitar on "Warm Summer Nights" and "Soul Music"
- Roger Jones – guitar on "Change Has Come"
- Odeen Mays – bass vocals
- Kelley O'Neal – alto saxophone on "Soul Music", soprano saxophone on "Still Here with Me"
- Michael Panepento – engineering; executive production; mixing; percussion on "Warm Summer Nights", "First Kiss", "Soul Music", and "Listen Up"; production on "Change Has Come", "Warm Summer Nights", "First Kiss", "Still Here with Me", "Soul Music", "Woman", "Listen Up", and "Going Back Home"; tambourine on "Going Back Home"
- Shaun Pezant – arrangement on "First Kiss", "Still Here with Me", "Soul Music", "Woman", "Listen Up", and "Going Back Home"; engineering; keyboards on "Warm Summer Nights", "First Kiss", "Still Here with Me", "Soul Music", "Woman", "Listen Up", and "Going Back Home"; mixing; Pro-Tools; production on "Change Has Come", "Warm Summer Nights", "First Kiss", "Still Here with Me", "Soul Music", "Woman", "Listen Up", and "Going Back Home"; programming on "Warm Summer Nights", "First Kiss", "Still Here with Me", "Soul Music", "Woman", "Listen Up", and "Going Back Home"
- Sam Pointer – acoustic guitar on "First Kiss" and "Going Back Home", slide guitar on "Going Back Home"
- Sean Michael Ray – bass guitar on "Change Has Come", "Warm Summer Nights", "First Kiss", "Soul Music", and "Going Back Home"
- Kerry Turman – bass guitar on "One of a Kind Lady" and "Hold Me"
- Doc Wagner – female vocals

Technical personnel

- Eric "e-man" Astor – engineering, mixing, Pro-Tools
- Reginald Dozier – engineering
- Keith Ferguson – arrangement on "Shawtyismygirlooyeah", production on "Shawtyismygirlooyeah", programming on "Shawtyismygirlooyeah", mixing
- Bernie Grundman – mastering
- Bill Meadows – engineering
- Carl Robinson – engineering
- James Yerby – production on "Change Has Come", "Warm Summer Nights", "Still Here with Me", "Soul Music", "Woman", and "Listen Up"
- Maxine Yerby – production on "Warm Summer Nights", "Still Here with Me", "Soul Music", "Woman", and "Listen Up"

== Chart performance ==
Still Here spent five weeks on the Billboard Top R&B/Hip Hop Albums chart, reaching up to 48 on May 22, 2010.

== See also ==
- List of 2010 albums
