= Together Again (The Temptations album) =

Studio album by The Temptations
- Released: September 11, 1987
- Recorded: 1987
- Studio: Conway Studios and Ocean Way Recording (Hollywood, California); Studio 55 (Los Angeles, California); Buckman Studio (Sherman Oaks, California)
- Genre: Soul, pop
- Length: 40:41
- Label: Motown; 6246
- Producer: Peter Bunetta; Rick Chudacoff

The Temptations chronology
To Be Continued... (1986)	Together Again (1987)	Special (1989)

Professional ratings
Review scores
Source	Rating
AllMusic	3/5 stars
The Rolling Stone Album Guide	3/5 stars

Together Again is an album by the American R&B vocal group the Temptations, released on Motown Records in 1987. It is the group's thirty-fourth studio album, and the first released under the Motown imprint. All of Motown Records' previous Temptations releases were made on the Gordy label, which was discontinued and whose artist roster and back catalog was consolidated into the main Motown label in 1987.

== Overview ==
The album's title was inspired by the return of Dennis Edwards to the group, following an absence of nearly four years. Edwards rejoined the Temptations prior to the recording of the album, replacing Ali-Ollie Woodson as primary lead singer. By the end of 1988, Edwards had departed (for a third and final time), and Woodson returned.

The LP includes the singles "Look What You Started" and "I Wonder Who She's Seeing Now", making it the group's only album to produce multiple Top 10 R&B releases in the 1980s. The album also included the modest R&B hit "Do You Wanna Go With Me" which was co-written by group members Otis Williams and Ron Tyson alongside Victor Carstarphen; the trio also co-wrote the album track "10 X 10" and both tracks were co-produced by The Temptations. The music video to "I Wonder Who She's Seeing Now" featured Billy Dee Williams and Fred Berry.

== Track listing ==
All tracks produced by Peter Bunetta and Rick Chudacoff; tracks 3 and 4 are co-produced by the Temptations.

Side one
No.	Title	Writer(s)	Lead singer(s)	Length
1.	"Look What You Started"	Peter Bunetta, Rick Chudacoff, Mark Holden	Dennis Edwards, Ron Tyson	5:09
2.	"I Wonder Who She's Seeing Now"	Lou Pardini, Jimmy George	Edwards, Melvin Franklin	5:03
3.	"10 X 10"	Otis Williams, Ronald Tyson, Victor Carstarphen	Edwards, Tyson, Richard Street, Williams, Franklin	4:52
4.	"Do You Wanna Go with Me"	Williams, Tyson, Carstarphen	Edwards	5:28

Side two
No.	Title	Writer(s)	Lead singer(s)	Length
5.	"Little Things"	Billy Barber	Edwards, Tyson, Street, Franklin	4:07
6.	"I Got Your Number"	Sharon Robinson, Hamish Stuart	Edwards, Franklin	4:21
7.	"Every Time I Close My Eyes"	Ken Cummings, Carmine Feravola, Frank Pagano	Street, Franklin	4:25
8.	"Lucky"	Dana Merino	Tyson, Franklin, Edwards	3:20
9.	"Put Your Foot Down"	Bunetta, Richard Darbyshire, Joe Ericksen	Edwards, Tyson, Street, Franklin	3:56

== Personnel ==
The Temptations

- Dennis Edwards – baritone and tenor vocals
- Melvin Franklin – bass vocals
- Richard Street – second tenor vocals
- Ron Tyson – tenor and falsetto vocals
- Otis Williams – second tenor and baritone vocals

Musicians

- Rick Chudacoff – keyboards (1, 5), arrangements (1, 2, 4–6)
- Aaron Zigman – keyboards (1, 3), drum programming (3), arrangements (3), synth horns (8)
- Robbie Buchanan – keyboards (2, 4–9), drum programming (9), arrangements (9)
- David Williams – guitars (1, 3)
- Dann Huff – guitars (2, 4–6, 9), acoustic guitar (7), electric guitar (7)
- Paul Jackson Jr. – guitars (6, 8)
- Neil Stubenhaus – bass (2, 4)
- Freddie Washington – bass (6, 7)
- Peter Bunetta – drum programming (1, 5), arrangements (1, 2, 4–6), drums (8)
- John Robinson – drums (2–4, 6, 7), additional drums (9)
- Paulinho da Costa – timbales (1), percussion (5–7, 9)
- Robert Greenidge – steel drums (5)
- Stevie Wonder – harmonica solo (2)
- Kim Hutchcraft – saxophones (2, 6, 8)
- Dan Higgins – tenor saxophone (5)
- Jerry Peterson – tenor sax solo (6)
- Lon Price – soprano sax solo (7)
- Larry Hall – trumpet (2, 6, 8)
- Jerry Hey – trumpet (2, 3, 5, 6, 8), flugelhorn (5), horn arrangements (5, 6, 8)
- Gary Grant – trumpet (3, 5), flugelhorn (5)

=== Production ===
- Russ Regan – executive producer
- Peter Bunetta – producer
- Rick Chudacoff – producer
- Daren Klein – recording, mixing (1, 3, 8, 9)
- Mick Guzauski – mixing (2–7)
- Frank Wolf – additional recording
- Bryant Arnett – assistant engineer
- Ted Blaisdell – assistant engineer
- Bob Loftus – assistant engineer
- Marnie Riley – assistant engineer
- Joe Schiff – assistant engineer
- Gary Wagner – assistant engineer
- Johnny Lee – art direction
- Jeff Lancaster – design
- Aaron Rapoport – photography
- Carmé Tenuta – make-up
- Avedon and Bertroni Men's Fashions – clothing

== Charts ==
Year	Album	Chart positions	
Year	Album	US	US R&B
1987	Together Again	112	12

=== Singles ===
Year	Single	Chart positions			
Year	Single	US	US R&B	US AC	UK
1987	"I Wonder Who She's Seeing Now"	—	3	36	90
1987	"Look What You Started"	—	8	—	63
1988	"Do You Wanna Go with Me"	—	53	—	—
