= McGilberry =

McGilberry is a surname. Notable people with the surname include:

- Harry McGilberry (1950–2006), American rhythm and blues singer
- Randy McGilberry (born 1953), American baseball player
