= Reflections (The Temptations album) =

Studio album by The Temptations
- Released: January 31, 2006
- Genre: Soul
- Length: 62:55
- Language: English
- Label: New Door
- Producer: Steve Harvey; Jeff Moskow; Harry Weinger; Benjamin Wright

The Temptations chronology
Legacy (2004)	Reflections (2006)	Back to Front (2007)

Reflections is a 2006 studio album by American soul group The Temptations. Other than a two-album stint in the late 1970s, this is the group's first recordings after leaving Motown, their home for over 40 years and is made up of cover versions of Motown tracks; it has received positive reviews from critics.

== Reception ==
Editors of AllMusic Guide scored this album 3.5 out of five stars, with reviewer Rob Theakston noting "the quality being surprisingly high for an act with such longevity" and opining that the band appears to be having fun in the studio. A review in Goldmine notes that "the sound is thoroughly contemporary... yet retains enough of the Tempts' impeccable harmonic blend to let you know exactly who's behind the mic".

== Track listing ==
1. "Can I Get a Witness" (Lamont Dozier, Brian Holland, and Eddie Holland) – 5:19
2. "Reflections" (Holland–Dozier–Holland) – 4:07
3. "How Sweet Is It to Be Loved by You" (Holland–Dozier–Holland) – 3:37
4. "Don't Leave Me This Way" (Kenny Gamble, Cary Gilbert, and Leon Huff) – 3:15
5. "This Old Heart of Mine (Is Weak for You)" (Dozer, B. Holland, E. Holland, and Sylvia Moy) – 4:55
6. "Ain't Nothing Like the Real Thing" (Nicholas Ashford and Valerie Simpson) – 4:10
7. "I Hear a Symphony" (Holland–Dozier–Holland) – 2:49
8. "Try It Baby" (Berry Gordy, Jr.) – 3:32
9. "Ain't No Mountain High Enough" (Ashford and Simpson) – 4:11
10. "Ooo Baby Baby" (Warren "Pete" Moore and Smokey Robinson) – 3:45
11. "What Becomes of the Brokenhearted" (Paul Riser and William Weatherspoon) – 4:03
12. "Never Can Say Goodbye" (Clifton Davis) – 4:54
13. "I'll Be There" (Hal Davis, Gordy, and Willie Hutch) – 4:59
14. "Neither One of Us (Wants to Be the First to Say Goodbye)" (Jim Weatherly) – 4:36
15. "Reach Out and Touch (Somebody's Hand)" (Ashford and Simpson) – 4:26

== Personnel ==
The Temptations

- G.C. Cameron – tenor/baritone vocals
- Joe Herndon – bass vocals
- Ron Tyson – first tenor/falsetto vocals
- Terry Weeks – second tenor vocals
- Otis Williams – baritone vocals, executive production

Additional musicians

- Steve Baxter – trombone
- Darrell Crooks – guitar
- Steve Harvey – drums, engineering, keyboards, mixing, percussion, production, strings
- Hornilicious – horn
- Marlena Jeter – backing vocals
- Roman Johnson – harpsichord, piano, grand piano, vibraphone, Wurlitzer
- Vann Johnson – vocals, backing vocals
- Nikko Lowe – backing vocals
- Anthony Patler – Hammond organ
- Tom Ralls – trombone
- Louis Jr. VanTaylor – flute, saxophone
- Bobby Ray Watson – bass guitar
- The Benjamin Wright Orchestra – orchestra
- Edward Wright – percussion

Technical personnel

- Shelly Berger – executive production
- Ashley Culp – production coordination
- Reginald Dozier – engineering, mixing
- Paul Erickson – engineering
- Jeff Moskow – associate production
- Ryan Null – photo coordination
- Aaron Rapoport – photography
- Ryan Rogers – design
- Doug Schwartz – mastering
- Vartan – art direction
- Harry Weinger – associate production
- Benjamin F. Wright – arrangement, conducting, engineering, production

== Chart performance ==
Reflections spent two weeks on the Billboard 200, peaking at 80 on February 18, 2006, and spent 10 weeks on the Billboard Top R&B/Hip Hop Albums chart, reaching up to 14 on the same date.

== See also ==
- List of 2006 albums
