= Theo Peoples =

American R&B and soul singer

- Born: Theoplis Peoples III; January 24, 1961 (age 65); St. Louis, Missouri, U.S.
- Occupation: Singer
- Known for: The Temptations; Four Tops

Theo Peoples (born Theoplis Peoples III; January 24, 1961) is an American R&B and soul singer from St. Louis, Missouri.

== Biography ==
His first recordings with the Temptations were released in the box set Emperors of Soul (1994) where he sang lead on "Givin' U The Best", "Elevator Eyes" and "Blueprint For Love". A music producer, Richard Perry, worked with the Temptations to make the album For Lovers Only (1995) and included the song "Night and Day", on which Peoples sang lead vocals. The track was later featured in the film What Women Want (2000). After Ali-Ollie Woodson left the Temptations in 1996 due to his battle with throat cancer, Peoples assumed the role of lead second tenor/baritone for the group.

Although he was replaced by Barrington "Bo" Henderson before the album's release, Peoples made significant contributions to the multi-platinum and Grammy Award nominated Phoenix Rising. He wrote and sang "This Is My Promise” and sang lead on the group's #1 hit "Stay.” Peoples has confirmed in subsequent interviews that he was fired from the Temptations due to having issues with drug addiction. After being released from The Temptations and the release of Phoenix Rising, he released his solo debut Down Time in 2000.

In 1998, the Four Tops recruited former Temptations Theo Peoples to restore the group to a quartet. By the turn of the century, Levi Stubbs had become ill from cancer; Ronnie McNeir was recruited to fill the Lawrence Payton position and Theo Peoples stepped into Stubbs' shoes as lead singer.
