= Temptations 60 =

Studio album by The Temptations
- Released: January 28, 2022
- Studios: Scott Frankfurt Studio; Tarpan Studios
- Genre: Soul
- Length: 53:45
- Language: English
- Label: UMe
- Producers: Dan Bishop; Thomas "T. C." Campbell; Dave Darling; Howard DeLoach; Es-K; Dennis Nelson; Smokey Robinson; Ron Tyson; Narada Michael Walden; Otis Williams

The Temptations chronology
All the Time (2018)	Temptations 60 (2022)

Singles from Temptations 60
- 1. "Is It Gonna Be Yes Or No" Released: September 23, 2021

Temptations 60 is the sixty-fourth studio album by American soul group The Temptations. It was released on January 28, 2022, by UMe. The release marks the 60th anniversary of the group signing to Motown and was preceded by two singles, including a collaboration with Smokey Robinson. The album has received positive reviews from critics.

== Recording and release ==
Temptations 60 was recorded as part of a year-long celebration of the sixtieth anniversary of the group, featuring their first tour since the COVID-19 pandemic and a run of the jukebox musical Ain't Too Proud. The line-up for this recording includes the only surviving original member, Otis Williams, who took the recording sessions as an opportunity to re-record one of the band's first songs, the doo-wop ballad "Come On". Williams also reached out to songwriter and musician Smokey Robinson who was responsible for writing many of The Temptations' earliest hits, but only actually collaborated with them one time in the studio, recording "The Christmas Song" for a 1989 compilation; the resulting "Is It Gonna Be Yes or No" was a single. This is the only album by The Temptations to feature Mario Corbino. He left the group before the album’s release and he is not pictured in the album’s artwork, unlike the other members.

== Reception ==
Editors of AllMusic Guide scored this album three out of five stars, with reviewer Andy Kellman calling this album "an inspired return that sensibly balances the past with the present" and opining "hearing these five voices together is a treat at all times". In Record Collector, Chris Roberts rated this four out of five stars, calling this "a remarkably vivacious album" and sums up the confluence of strong vocals, a classic soul music sound, and contemporary hip hop influences "irresistible". Writing for theGrio, Matthew Allen considers this release "an album with more moments of brilliance and pleasure" than simply rehashing the band's sound or simply updating it with fresh references. In The Spill Magazine, Aaron Badgley rated this album 3.5 out of five, considering this a mix of traditional soul music that is "not retro but rather aging" as the band changes its style, but pointing out that some of the production is uneven and makes the music "middle of the road", but sums up, "this album is full of remarkable music". The Arts Fuse's Allen Michie considers Temptations 60 a "joyful celebration" of the group's history and longevity, that includes some failed experiments with contemporary styles and ballads that "can't seem to keep up a woke feminism for very long", but also notes several successful tracks and supposes that if this is the band's final release "then it’s a fitting farewell in a triumphant year for the band".

== Track listing ==
Temptations 60 track listing
No.	Title	Writer(s)	Lead singer(s)	Length
1.	"Let It Reign"	K.Sparks	K. Sparks	2:43
2.	"When We Were Kings"	Preston Glass; Narada Michael Walden; Otis Williams	Mario Corbino; Ron Tyson; Terry Weeks	4:51
3.	"Is It Gonna Be Yes or No"	William Robinson	Robinson; Weeks; Corbino; Williams; Tyson	4:11
4.	"Time for the People"	Tyson; Thomas “TC”Campbell	Weeks; Corbino; Tyson; Maurice King (voice over)	5:25
5.	"Elevator Eyes"	Dennis Nelson; Williams	Weeks; Corbino	4:07
6.	"My Whole World Stopped Without You"	Josh Monroy; Blake Sennett; Tyrone Taylor	Weeks	4:04
7.	"You Don’t Know Your Woman (Like I Do)"	Williams; Nelson	Weeks; Corbino; Tyson	4:00
8.	"How Do You Spell Love"	Williams; Nelson	Corbino	4:10
9.	"Calling Out Your Name"	Williams; Campbell	Weeks	5:34
10.	"I Want It Right Now"	Tyson; Campbell	Tyson; Keisha Morgan (spoken word)	4:21
11.	"Breaking My Back"	Williams; Walden; Jeffrey Cohen; Jackson Allen	Corbino	4:05
12.	"Come On"	Williams	Williams (spoken word); Corbino; Willy Greene	6:12

"Come On" contains samples of the following original Motown masters performed by The Temptations:

- "Check Yourself" (Elbridge Bryant, Berry Gordy, Jr., David English, and Williams)
- "(You're My) Dream Come True" (Gordy)
- "Oh Mother of Mine (William "Mickey" Stevenson and Williams)
- "The Way You Do the Things You Do" (Robinson and Bobby Rogers)
- "Ain't Too Proud to Beg" (Eddie Holland and Norman Whitfield)
- "Just My Imagination (Running Away with Me)" (Barrett Strong and Whitfield)
- "For Once in My Life" (Ron Miller and Orlando Murden)
- "Papa Was a Rolling Stone" (Strong and Whitfield)
- "My Girl" (Robinson and Ronnie White)

== Personnel ==
The Temptations

- Mario Corbino – tenor vocals
- Willie Greene – bass vocals
- Ron Tyson – first tenor/falsetto vocals, vocal arrangement on "Time for the People" and "I Want It Right Now", production on "Time for the People" and "I Want It Right Now"
- Terry Weeks – second tenor vocals
- Otis Williams – baritone vocals; vocal arrangement on "Elevator Eyes", "How Do You Spell Love", "Calling Out Your Name", and "Come On"; recording; production on "Elevator Eyes", "How Do You Spell Love", "Calling Out Your Name", and "Come On"; executive production

Additional personnel

- Gerald Albright – saxophone solo on "Calling Out Your Name"
- Jackson Allen – guitar on "When We Were Kings" and "Breaking My Back", keyboards on "Breaking My Back", bass guitar on "Breaking My Back", drum programming on "Breaking My Back", percussion on "Breaking My Back"
- Chris Bellman – mastering
- Dan Bishop – guitar on "Let It Reign", bass guitar on "Let It Reign", arrangement on "Let It Reign", production on "Let It Reign"
- Thomas "TC" Campbell – keyboards on "Time for the People", "Calling Out Your Name", "I Want It Right Now", and "Come On"; arrangement on "Time for the People", "Calling Out Your Name", "I Want It Right Now", and "Come On"; sequencing on "Time for the People", "Calling Out Your Name", "I Want It Right Now", and "Come On"; music direction on "When We Were Kings" and Breaking My Back; production on "Time for the People", "Calling Out Your Name", "I Want It Right Now", and "Come On"
- Mark Cargill – strings on "Calling Out Your Name"
- Darrell Crooks – guitar on "Calling Out Your Name" and "Come On"
- John Culbreth – trumpet on "Let It Reign"
- Dave Darling – production on "My Whole World Stopped Without You"
- Melvin Davis – bass guitar on "Time for the People"
- Howard DeLoach – production management
- Justus Dobrin – keyboards on "When We Were Kings" and "Breaking My Back"
- Es-K – arrangement, production on "Let It Reign"
- Steve Ferrone – drums on "Is It Gonna Be Yes or No"
- Jorel "J-Fly" Flynn – drums on "You Don't Know Your Woman (Like I Do)" and "How Do You Spell Love"
- Scott Frankfurt – engineering on "Let It Reign" and "Breaking My Back", mixing on "Let It Reign"
- Dave Garfield – Fender Rhodes electric piano on "Is It Gonna Be Yes or No"
- Larry Graham – bass guitar on "When We Were Kings"
- Steve Howard – guitar on "I Want It Right Now"
- Maurice Kitchen – voiceover on "Time for the People"
- Scott Leon – photography
- Wayne Lindsey – keyboards on "Elevator Eyes"
- Tom "Bones" Malone – horns on "When We Were Kings"
- Paul Moore – package design
- Keisha Morgan – voiceover on "I Want It Right Now"
- Meire Murakami – logo design
- Ray A. Myrie – bass guitar on "I Want It Right Now"
- Dennis Nelson – scatting on "Elevator Eyes", drums on "Elevator Eyes" and "How Do You Spell Love", keyboards on "Elevator Eyes" and "How Do You Spell Love", arrangement on "Elevator Eyes" and "How Do You Spell Love", production on "Elevator Eyes" and "How Do You Spell Love"
- Paulie Philippone – clavinet on "Let It Reign", piano on "Let It Reign", Prophet synthesizer on "Let It Reign"
- Valerie Pinkston – backing vocals on "Come On"
- Joel Powell – bass guitar on "You Don't Know Your Woman (Like I Do)" and "How Do You Spell Love"
- Tony Pulizzi – guitar on "Is It Gonna Be Yes or No"
- Jim Reitzel – engineering on "When We Were Kings" and "Breaking My Back", mixing on "Breaking My Back"
- Smokey Robinson – vocals on "Is It Gonna Be Yes or No", production on "Is It Gonna Be Yes or No"
- Calvin Snowden – bass guitar on "Elevator Eyes"
- K. Sparks – rapping on "Let It Reign", production on "Let It Reign"
- J-Rod Sullivan – drums on "Elevator Eyes"
- Cecil "C. C." Thomas – bass guitar on "Calling Out Your Name" and "Come On"
- Raffia Ford Thomas – backing vocals on "Come On"
- Nicole Thompson – backing vocals on "Calling Out Your Name" and "Come On"
- Robert Turner – keyboards on "You Don't Know Your Woman (Like I Do)"
- Vartan – art direction
- Narada Michael Walden – drums on "When We Were Kings" and "Breaking My Back", keyboards on "When We Were Kings" and "Breaking My Back", arrangement on "When We Were Kings" and "Breaking My Back", production on "When We Were Kings" and "Breaking My Back"
- Maitland Ward – guitar on "Time for the People"
- Freddie Washington – bass guitar on "Is It Gonna Be Yes or No"

== Chart performance ==
Temptations 60 spent one week on the Billboard Top Album Sales chart, placing 97 on February 12, 2022.

== See also ==
- 2022 in American music
- Lists of 2022 albums
