= Back to Front (The Temptations album) =

Studio album by The Temptations
- Released: October 23, 2007
- Length: 48:59
- Label: New Door
- Producers: Steve Harvey; Benjamin Wright

The Temptations chronology
Reflections (2006)	Back to Front (2007)	Still Here (2010)

Singles from 20
- 1. "How Deep Is Your Love"; 2. "Minute by Minute"

Back to Front is the sixty-first studio album by American vocal group The Temptations. It was released by New Door Records on October 23, 2007. It contains mostly covers of songs that were hits for Stax Records artists, as well as other non-Motown artists. The album also includes covers of "Minute by Minute" by The Doobie Brothers and "How Deep Is Your Love" by The Bee Gees.

== Critical reception ==
Professional ratings
Review scores
Source	Rating
AllMusic	3.5/5 stars

AllMusic editor Alex Henderson found that Back to Front "is not in a class with the Temptations' most essential '60s and '70s recordings, but it is an enjoyably satisfying tribute to R&B's pre-urban contemporary, pre-hip-hop era."

== Track listing ==
All tracks produced by Steve the scotsman Harvey and Benjamin Wright.

No.	Title	Writer(s)	Lead singer(s)	Length
1.	"Never, Never Gonna Give You Up"	Barry White	Bruce Williamson	4:26
2.	"Hold On, I'm Comin'"	Isaac Hayes, David Porter	Terry Weeks, Williamson	3:03
3.	"Wake Up Everybody"	John Whitehead, Gene McFadden, Victor Carsarphen	Williamson	5:46
4.	"Minute by Minute"	Michael McDonald, Lester Abrams	Weeks, Williamson,	4:43
5.	"I'm In Love"	Bobby Womack	Williamson	3:18
6.	"Don't Ask My Neighbors"	Skip Scarborough	Tyson	4:37
7.	"Love Ballad"	Skip Scarborough	Weeks	4:41
8.	"Let It Be Me"	Gilbert Bécaud, Pierre Delanoë	Tyson, Keke Williams	4:56
9.	"How Deep Is Your Love"	Barry Gibb, Robin Gibb, Maurice Gibb	Tyson	4:29
10.	"(Every Time I Turn Around) Back in Love Again"	Len Ron Hanks, Zane Grey	Williamson	4:05
11.	"Respect Yourself"	Luther Ingram, Mack Rice	Williamson, Tyson	4:25
12.	"If You Love Somebody Set Them Free" (CD Bonus Track)"	Sting	Williamson,Weeks	4:41

== Personnel ==
- Otis Williams (baritone)
- Ron Tyson (first tenor/falsetto)
- Terry Weeks (second tenor)
- Joe Herndon (bass)
- Bruce Williamson (baritenor)

== Charts ==
Chart performance for Back to Front
Chart (2007)	Peak position
US Billboard 200	108
US Top R&B/Hip-Hop Albums (Billboard)	19
