= All the Time (The Temptations album) =

Studio album by The Temptations
- Released: May 4, 2018
- Studios: Clear Lake Recording, North Hollywood, California, United States; The Doghouse Studio, Los Angeles, California, United States; Mulholland Music, Chatsworth, California, United States
- Genre: Soul
- Length: 46:55
- Language: English
- Label: UMe
- Producer: Dave Darling

The Temptations chronology
Still Here (2010)	All the Time (2018)	Temptations 60 (2022)

All the Time is a 2018 studio album by American soul group The Temptations made up of cover versions of contemporary R&B songs. This is the group's only album to feature Larry Braggs and received mixed reviews and modest Billboard chart success.

== Reception ==
Editors of AllMusic Guide scored this album 2.5 out of five stars, with reviewer Andy Kellman opining that the choice of contemporary songs to cover ends with "mixed results", noting highlights from several individual tracks. Writing for the Associated Press, Mark Kennedy praises the differing musical tones on the album and calls the original compositions "terrific".

== Track listing ==
All tracks produced by Dave Darling. Unless otherwise noted songs are original compositions.

Side one
No.	Title	Writer(s)	Lead singer(s)	Length
1.	"Stay with Me, originally by Sam Smith"	Jeff Lynne, James Napier, Tom Petty, William Phillips, and Sam Smith	Larry Braggs, Terry Weeks, Ron Tyson	3:42
2.	"Earned It, originally by The Weeknd"	Ahmad Balshe, Stephan Moccio, Jason Quenneville, and Abel Tesfaye	Weeks	4:52
3.	"Pretty Wings, originally by Maxwell"	Hod David and Maxwell	Braggs	4:11
4.	"Thinking Out Loud, originally by Ed Sheeran"	Ed Sheeran and Amy Wadge	Otis Williams (spoken word), Weeks	5:10
5.	"Waitin' On You"	Marc Alonzo, Dennis Nelson, and Otis Williams	Weeks	4:01

Side two
No.	Title	Writer(s)	Lead singer(s)	Length
1.	"Remember the Time, originally by Michael Jackson"	Bernard Belle, Michael Jackson, and Teddy Riley	Weeks, Braggs, Williams	3:35
2.	"Be My Wife"	Patrick Dean and Brian Allen Scott	Braggs	3:58
3.	"Still Feel Like Your Man, originally by John Mayer"	John Mayer	Tyson	3:48
4.	"When I Was Your Man, originally by Bruno Mars"	Philip Lawrence, Ari Levine, Bruno Mars, and Andrew Wyatt	Braggs	3:30
5.	"Move Them Britches"	Larry Ladell Braggs and Dwight Hunter,	Braggs	3:23

Some CD editions have two additionals tracks: 11."Stay with Me" (Gospel Mix) – 3:19

12."Move Them Britches" (Heathens Remix) – 3:29

== Personnel ==
The Temptations

- Larry Braggs – tenor vocals
- Willie Greene – bass vocals
- Ron Tyson – first tenor/falsetto vocals
- Terry Weeks – second tenor vocals
- Otis Williams – baritone vocals, executive production

Additional personnel

- Alfredo Ballesteros – saxophone
- Rory Bishop – percussion
- Brie Darling – percussion
- Dave Darling – guitar, mixing, production
- Zackary Darling – mixing on "Be My Wife", engineering
- Theron Derrick – drums on "Move Them Britches" and "Move Them Britches" (Heathens Mix)
- Madeline Falcone – viola
- Davey Faragher – bass guitar
- Nicole Garcia – violin, concertmaster
- Jay Gilbert – photography
- Carvel Holloway – trumpet, flugelhorn
- Peter Jacobson – cello
- Kudisan Kai – backing vocals
- Susan Lavoie – art direction
- Emily Lenck – violin
- Herman Matthews – drums
- Meat and Potatoes, Inc. – design
- Randy Mitchell – guitar
- Rashidra Scott Mhlanga – backing vocals
- Arlan Oscar – keyboards
- Michael Parnell – string arrangement
- Ismael Pineda – percussion
- Bruce Resnikoff – executive production for UMe
- Rich Ruttenberg – piano on "Thinking Out Loud"
- Doug Schwartz – mastering
- Sandy Simmons – backing vocals
- Zach Zunis – guitar on "Stay with Me" and "Stay with Me" (Gospel Mix)

== Chart performance ==
Still Here spent one week on the Billboard Top Album Sales chart, placing 82 on May 19, 2018.

== See also ==
- List of 2018 albums
