= Kell Osborne =

American singer (1939–2012)

- Born: March 12, 1939; Birmingham, Alabama, U.S.
- Origin: Los Angeles, California, U.S.
- Died: January 29, 2012 (aged 72)
- Genres: R&B, soul
- Occupation: Singer
- Instrument: Vocals
- Years active: 1955-2012
- Labels: Trey, Atlantic, Class, Capitol, Loma, Revis, Warner Bros., Mercury, Universal
- Formerly of: The Primes

Kell Osborne (March 12, 1939 – January 29, 2012) was an American singer best known as a member of The Primes, a group which would later be known as The Temptations.

== Early years ==
Kell Osborne was born in Birmingham, Alabama on March 12, 1939, he was raised by his deeply religious stepfather. His stepfather had wanted him to become a minister. However, he decided to be a singer. In 1955 he and his friends Eddie Kendricks, Paul Williams, and Willy Waller started a singing group known as The Cavaliers, and they began performing in Birmingham. In 1957 Waller left the group, and they were reduced to a trio. In 1958 they left Birmingham to break out into the music business. They settled in Cleveland, Ohio, where Milton Jenkins would become their manager.

They later moved to Detroit, Michigan, not too long after that Jenkins changed the group's name to The Primes, and they got a spin-off group known as The Primettes, members of that group included Diane (later Diana) Ross, Florence Ballard, Mary Wilson, and Betty McGlown. In 1960 Kell left the group and moved to Los Angeles, California to start a solo career, and as a result the group disbanded, Kendricks, and Williams would go on to become members of The Temptations.

== Career ==
Kell signed with Lester Sill and Lee Hazlewood's Trey label, and Phil Spector became his producer. He recorded the songs "Bells Of St Mary's", and "That's Alright Baby". Atlantic Records picked up the songs for national distribution, they were both a hit in Baltimore, Maryland. Osborne later got out of his contract with the Trey label and signed with Class Records. There he recorded the songs "Chickadee", "Do You Mind", "Would You Laugh", and "Eye Of The Fire". In 1963 he signed with Capitol Records, however, he was drafted that year ending hopes of a future with Capitol. During this time his close friend and fellow soldier Billy Revis became his manager, Osborne recorded the songs "Yaya Yaya", and "Something For The Books". In 1965 his draft was up and he got out of the military. Osborne later signed with Warner Bros. Records. There he recorded the song "You Cant Outsmart A Woman". That was the only song to come of this record deal and Osborne left Warner Bros. not too long after. Many labels were interested in Osborne, however, his close friendship with Billy Revis held him back, keeping him from many good opportunities. The ABC label was interested in Osborne but not Revis, so Osborne got out of his management contract with Revis and signed with Mercury Records. But he wasn't very successful there so he left the Mercury label. In 1995 Osborne left the music business and took a job driving buses in order to keep a stable income.

He returned in 2005 releasing an album of new material with some initial interest shown by Universal Records. Kell Osborne has made many contributions to music over the years. He died on January 29, 2012.
