= The Temptations =

American rhythm and blues group

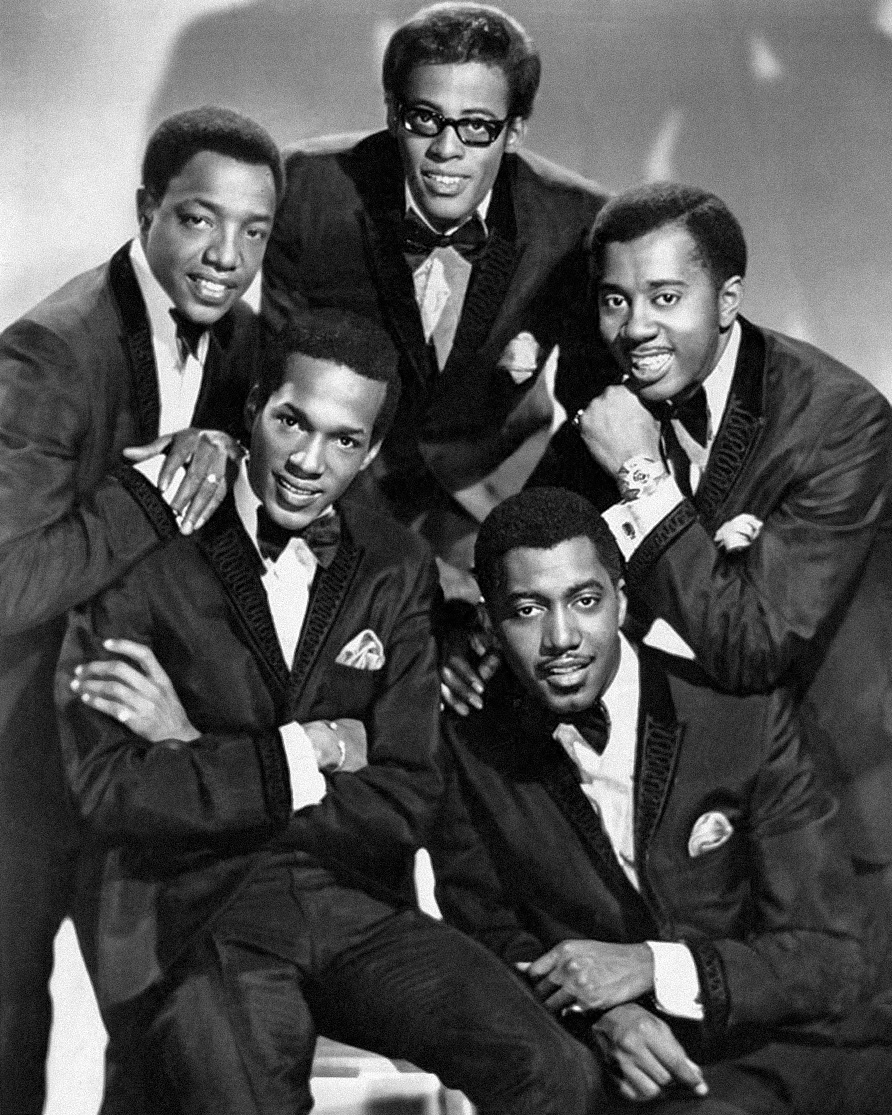
- The "Classic Five" lineup of the Temptations in 1964; Clockwise from top: David Ruffin, Melvin Franklin, Otis Williams, Eddie Kendricks and Paul Williams

Background information
- Also known as: The Elgins, the Pirates
- Origin: Detroit, Michigan, U.S.
- Genres: R&B; soul; funk; progressive soul; psychedelic soul
- Years active: 1961–present
- Labels: Motown; Gordy; Miracle; Warwick; UAR; Capitol; Atlantic; New Door
- Members: Otis Williams; Ron Tyson; Terry Weeks; Tony Grant; Jawan M. Jackson
- Past members: Melvin Franklin; Eddie Kendricks; Paul Williams; Elbridge "Al" Bryant; David Ruffin; Dennis Edwards; Ricky Owens; Richard Street; Damon Harris; Glenn Leonard; Louis Price; Ali-Ollie Woodson; Theo Peoples; Ray Davis; Harry McGilberry; Barrington "Bo" Henderson; G. C. Cameron; Joe Herndon; Bruce Williamson; Larry Braggs; Willie Greene; Mario Corbino
- Website: www.temptationsofficial.com

The Temptations are an American vocal group formed in Detroit, Michigan, in 1961 as the Elgins, known for their string of successful singles and albums with Motown from the 1960s to the mid-1970s. The group's work with producer Norman Whitfield, beginning with the Top 10 hit single "Cloud Nine" in October 1968, pioneered psychedelic soul, and was significant in the evolution of R&B and soul music. The group members were known for their choreography, distinct harmonies, and dress style. Having sold tens of millions of albums, the Temptations are among the most successful groups in popular music.

Featuring five male vocalists and dancers (save for brief periods with fewer or more members), the group's founding members came from two rival Detroit vocal groups: Otis Williams, Elbridge "Al" Bryant, and Melvin Franklin of (Otis Williams &) the Distants, and Eddie Kendricks and Paul Williams of the Primes. In 1964, Bryant was replaced by David Ruffin, who was the lead vocalist on a number of the group's biggest hits, including "My Girl" (1964), "Ain't Too Proud to Beg" (1966), and "I Wish It Would Rain" (1967). Ruffin was replaced in 1968 by Dennis Edwards, with whom the group continued to record hit records such as "Cloud Nine" (1968), "I Can't Get Next to You" (1969), and "Ball of Confusion (That's What the World Is Today)" (1970). Kendricks and Paul Williams both left the group in 1971, with subsequent members including Richard Street, Damon Harris, Glenn Leonard, Ron Tyson, and Ali-Ollie Woodson, the last of whom was the lead singer on late-period hit "Treat Her Like a Lady" in 1984 and the theme song for the children's movement program Kids in Motion in 1987.

Over the course of their career, the Temptations released four Billboard Hot 100 number-one singles and fourteen R&B number-one singles. The group was the first Motown act to win a Grammy Award – for "Cloud Nine" in 1969 – and the Grammy Lifetime Achievement Award, received in 2013. They won four Grammy Awards in total. The Temptations – specifically Edwards, Franklin, Kendricks, Ruffin, Otis Williams and Paul Williams – were inducted into the Rock and Roll Hall of Fame in 1989. Three Temptations songs, "My Girl", "Just My Imagination (Running Away with Me)" (1971), and "Papa Was a Rollin' Stone" (1972), are included among the Rock and Roll Hall of Fame's 500 Songs that Shaped Rock and Roll. The Temptations were ranked No. 68 on Rolling Stone magazine's list of the "100 Greatest Artists of All Time" in 2010. In 2023, the group were ranked No. 1 by Billboard magazine on its list of the "100 Greatest R&B/Hip-Hop Artists of All Time".

As of 2026, the Temptations continue to perform with Otis Williams in the lineup, who is the group's last surviving original member. Williams owns the rights to the Temptations name.

== History ==
=== Origins: second half of the 1950s ===
Eddie Kendricks and Paul Williams started singing together in church as children in Birmingham, Alabama. By their teenage years, they formed a doo-wop quartet in 1955 with Kell Osborne and Wiley Waller, naming themselves the Cavaliers.

After Waller left the group in 1957, the remaining trio left Birmingham to break into the music business. The group settled in Detroit where they changed their name to the Primes under the direction of Milton Jenkins. The Primes soon became well known around the Detroit area for their meticulous performances. Jenkins later created a sister group, the Primettes, later known as the Supremes. Kendricks was already seen as a "matinee idol" in the Detroit area, while Williams was well received for his baritone vocals.

Meanwhile, concurrently, Texas teenager Otis Williams moved to Detroit as a youngster to be with his mother. By 1958, Williams was the leader of a vocal group named Otis Williams and the Siberians. The group included Elbridge "Al" Bryant, James "Pee-Wee" Crawford, Vernard Plain and Arthur Walton. The band recorded a song, "Pecos Kid" for a label run by radio deejay Senator Bristol Bryant. Shortly after its release, the group changed its name to the El Domingoes. Subsequently, Montgomery native Melvin Franklin replaced Arthur Walton as bass vocalist and Detroit-born Richard Street (claimed by Melvin Franklin to be his cousin) replaced Vernard Plain as lead singer. Signing with Johnnie Mae Matthews' Northern Records, the group had their name changed again to the Distants.

The group recorded two Northern Records singles including "Come On" (1959) and "Alright" (1960). Between these releases, "Come On" became a local hit, and the Warwick Records label picked the record up for national distribution. Following the release of "Alright", Matthews appointed Williams the group leader, and the group's name was changed to Otis Williams & the Distants. During this period, both the Primes and the Distants were influenced by other vocal groups including the Miracles. Other inspirations included the Cadillacs, Frankie Lymon & the Teenagers, the Drifters, and the Isley Brothers. Though "Come On" was a local hit in the Detroit area, the Distants never saw much record sales, and "Alright" was not so successful. After receiving an offer from Berry Gordy to sign with Motown Records, the Distants got out of their contract with Northern Records. However, James "Pee-Wee" Crawford and Richard Street shortly departed from the group and the remaining members lost use of "the Distants" name. Richard Street later formed another 'Distants' band who recorded for the Thelma label in the early 1960s.

=== Early years: 1961–1963 ===
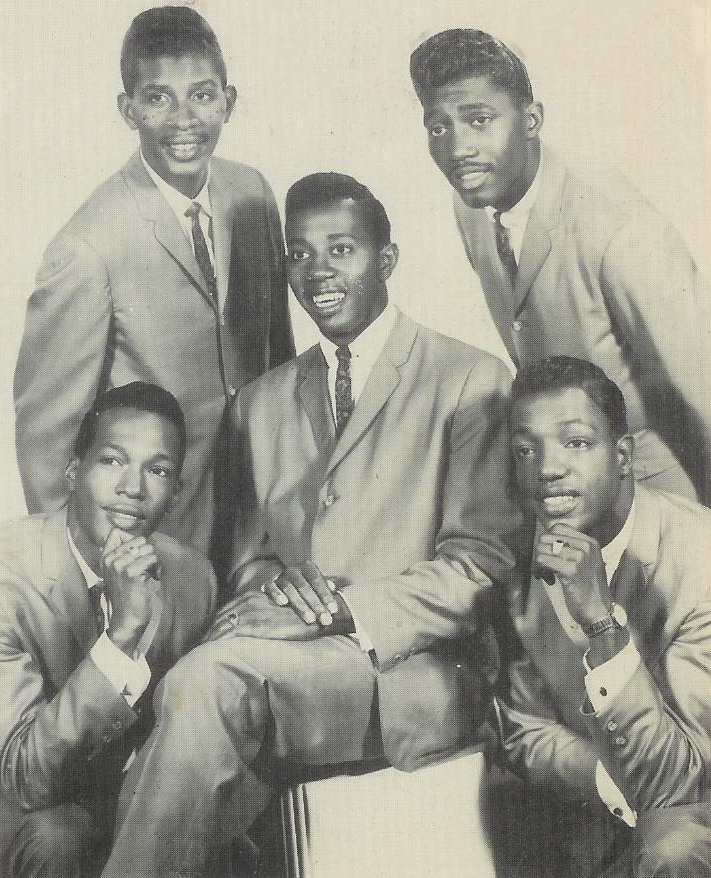
A promotional image of the original early 1960s Temptations lineup. Clockwise from top right: Otis Williams, Paul Williams, Melvin Franklin, Eddie Kendricks, and Elbridge "Al" Bryant.

Members of the Distants were acquainted with the Primes, as both groups participated in the same talent shows and performed at the same public venues. Friendly rivals, the Primes were considered to be the more polished and vocally stronger group of the two. However, this last group disbanded in 1960 after Kell Osborne moved to California. Eddie Kendricks and Paul Williams returned to Alabama following the band's dissolution. While visiting relatives in Detroit, Kendricks called Otis Williams, who desperately needed two more members for an audition for Gordy's label and offered Kendricks a lead singer place in this new group, which would also include fellow former Distants members Franklin and Bryant. Kendricks agreed on the condition he bring Paul Williams with him. Otis Williams happily agreed, and Kendricks and Paul Williams moved back to Detroit to join the new group.

The original name for the new lineup of Otis Williams, Melvin Franklin, Elbridge "Al" Bryant, Eddie Kendricks, and Paul Williams was the Elgins. Under that name, the group auditioned for Motown in March 1961. Already impressed with some of the members after hearing session work, Berry Gordy agreed to sign the group to the Motown imprint, Miracle Records. However, before signing, Gordy discovered another group was using the name of "Elgins". The group began tossing about ideas for a new name on the steps of the Hitsville U.S.A. studio. On a suggestion from Miracle Records employee Billy Mitchell, songwriter Mickey Stevenson, and group members Otis Williams and Paul Williams, the Temptations became the group's new moniker. The Elgins name re-surfaced at Motown in 1965, when Gordy renamed a quartet called the Downbeats as the Elgins.

The Temptations' first two singles, "Oh Mother of Mine" and "Check Yourself", with Paul Williams on lead, were released on Miracle before Gordy closed the label down and reassigned the band to his latest imprint, Gordy Records. On the Gordy imprint, Eddie Kendricks sang lead on the Temptations' first charted single, "(You're My) Dream Come True", which peaked at number 22 on the R&B chart in May 1962. Later that year, the Temptations began touring as part of the Motortown Revue. The group issued eight recordings between 1961 and 1963 without much success.

Paul Williams and Eddie Kendricks split the leads during this early period, with Al Bryant, Otis Williams, and Melvin Franklin occasionally singing lead, as they did on a song titled "Isn't She Pretty". For a brief time, the group almost had their name changed to the Pirates, and under that name they recorded the songs "Mind Over Matter" and "I'll Love You Till I Die". Eventually the label and the group decided against it. One hit song, "Do You Love Me", was originally to be recorded by the Temptations. When he couldn't get in contact with the group, Gordy produced a version for the Contours.

In 1963, the Temptations began working with Smokey Robinson as producer and writer. Robinson's first work with the group was the Paul Williams-led "I Want a Love I Can See". While the song failed to chart, it did eventually become a popular live performance spot for the group and particularly for Paul Williams in general. Some called the group "the Hitless Temptations" due to their lack of hits.

During this time, David Ruffin began following the group around as he aspired to join them. During a local Detroit performance, Ruffin joined the group onstage and impressed the group with his vocal talent and dancing skills. Following that same time, Al Bryant had grown frustrated with the group's lack of success and became restless and uncooperative, preferring the mundane routine of his day job as a milkman over the rigors of rehearsal and performing. After a second altercation onstage at a Christmas performance, following an incident where he struck Paul with a beer bottle during a heated quarrel at an earlier gig in the middle of the year, Bryant was summarily fired from the group. As a result, David Ruffin was brought in as his replacement in January 1964. Though Ruffin's brother Jimmy was also considered for the slot, David was selected following his performance with them in 1963.

Bryant continued to perform in a number of other local groups and died at the age of 36 in Flagler County, Florida, of liver cirrhosis on October 26, 1975.

=== "Classic Five" Era: 1964–1968 ===
The Temptations then consisted of Otis Williams, Melvin Franklin, Paul Williams, Eddie Kendricks, and David Ruffin; the success that followed the group resulted in what would, in later years, be frequently referred to as the "Classic Five" lineup. In January 1964, Smokey Robinson and Miracles bandmate Bobby Rogers co-wrote and produced "The Way You Do the Things You Do" with Eddie Kendricks on lead and the single became the Temptations' first Top 20 hit that April.

Shortly afterward, "The Way You Do the Things You Do" and several pre-David Ruffin singles were compiled into the group's first album, Meet the Temptations, released in early 1964. The next two Temptations singles in 1964, "Girl (Why You Wanna Make Me Blue)" along with "I'll Be in Trouble" and its B-side "The Girl's Alright with Me", all featured Kendricks on lead (although Franklin sang one line in "I'll Be in Trouble"). However, producer Smokey Robinson saw potential in the "mellow yet gruff" voice of David Ruffin, and thought that if he could write the perfect song for his lead, then the group could have a Top 10 hit.

While traveling as part of Motown's Motortown Revue later that year, Robinson and fellow Miracles member Ronnie White wrote "My Girl", which the Temptations recorded in the fall of 1964 with Ruffin singing his first lead vocal for the group. Released as a single on December 21, 1964, the song became the Temptations' first number-one pop hit in March 1965. Over 50 years and multiple chart topping songs later, it is still their signature song to this day.

After the success of "My Girl", Ruffin sang lead on the next three singles: "It's Growing", "Since I Lost My Baby", and "My Baby", which all made it to the Top 20 in 1965. The B-side to "My Baby", "Don't Look Back", featured a stirring lead from Paul Williams, and was a sleeper hit on the R&B charts and a standard for vocal group playlists.

Norman Whitfield had requested the opportunity to write for the group and in 1966, Berry Gordy promised him that if Robinson's "Get Ready", with Eddie Kendricks on lead, failed to chart in the Top 20, Whitfield would be allowed to produce the next song. "Get Ready" subsequently missed its mark, so Gordy issued the Whitfield-produced "Ain't Too Proud to Beg", with David Ruffin on lead, as the next single. "Ain't Too Proud to Beg" outperformed "Get Ready" on the Billboard charts, and Whitfield became the Temptations' new main producer. He began pulling the group away from the ballad-based productions espoused by Robinson, toward a harder-edged and brass-heavy soul sound reminiscent of James Brown.

Nearly all singles Whitfield produced prior to 1968 featured David Ruffin on lead, including the R&B number-one/pop Top 10 hits "Beauty Is Only Skin Deep", "(I Know) I'm Losing You" and the early 1967 hit "(Loneliness Made Me Realize) It's You That I Need". Other important singles from this period include "All I Need", produced by Frank Wilson, a Whitfield protégé, and the "You're My Everything", on which Kendricks and Ruffin share lead. Studio albums during the "Classic Five" period, apart from Meet the Temptations, include The Temptations Sing Smokey (1965), The Temptin' Temptations (1965), Gettin' Ready (1966), The Temptations with a Lot o' Soul (1967), and The Temptations Wish It Would Rain (1968).

During this period, the various songwriting partners of Norman Whitfield included Roger Penzabene, Edward Holland, Jr., and the Temptations road show manager and guitarist Cornelius Grant. Subsequently, Barrett Strong, who sang the first hit at Motown in 1959, "Money (That's What I Want)", began working with Whitfield and Penzabene on the Temptations material after Eddie Holland left Motown with the rest of the Holland-Dozier-Holland songwriting/production team in 1967. Two of the Whitfield-Strong-Penzabene collaborations, "I Wish It Would Rain" and "I Could Never Love Another (After Loving You)", became hits in early 1968 after the suicide of Roger Penzabene in December 1967. Subsequently, Barrett Strong became the sole collaborator of Norman Whitfield.

The Temptations performing in 1967

From early 1964 to mid-1968, the Temptations went from unknown hopefuls to international stars and as a result, appeared frequently on television shows such as American Bandstand, The Ed Sullivan Show, and The Hollywood Palace. At the same time, the group began to achieve a crossover popularity, catering to middle America with a pop standards album (The Temptations in a Mellow Mood, 1967), the success of which resulted in performances at the famous Copacabana in New York City along with dates at other similar supper clubs.

=== David Ruffin's departure and Dennis Edwards' arrival: 1968 ===
By 1967, David Ruffin had begun demanding special treatment as lead singer, riding to and from gigs in a private mink-lined limousine with his then-girlfriend, Motown singer Tammi Terrell, instead of the limousine used by the other four bandmates. The other members slowly became irritated and annoyed with Ruffin's behavior. Following Motown's decision to rechristen the Supremes as Diana Ross & the Supremes and Martha & the Vandellas as Martha Reeves & the Vandellas, Ruffin felt entitled to the same treatment, and demanded that his group be renamed as well to David Ruffin & the Temptations. Ruffin was also causing friction with Berry Gordy by demanding an accounting of the group's earnings; Motown partially acquiesced by allowing the Temptations to retain an outside accounting firm, but the firm did not have full access to the books from the Temptations' manager, International Talent Management, Inc., which was a subsidiary of Motown.

Some of this behavior was attributed to the fact that by this time Ruffin had begun using cocaine regularly, building further tension within the group and causing him to miss a number of group meetings, rehearsals, and concerts. There was a consensus among the rest of the group that Ruffin needed to be replaced. When Ruffin missed a June 1968 engagement at a Cleveland supper club in order to attend a show by his new girlfriend, Barbara Gail Martin (daughter of Dean Martin), the group decided that he had crossed the line. The other four Temptations drew up legal documentation, officially firing Ruffin on June 27, 1968. The next day, Dennis Edwards, a singer formerly of the Contours that Eddie Kendricks and Otis Williams already had pegged as a potential Ruffin replacement, was hired to take Ruffin's place.

Edwards and Ruffin were good friends, and at first, Ruffin accepted his dismissal and encouraged Edwards. However, at Edwards' official debut with the Temptations in Valley Forge, Pennsylvania, on July 7, Ruffin came to the show and jumped onstage, taking the microphone from Edwards, singing lead on "Ain't Too Proud to Beg", and disappearing as quickly as he had appeared. Ruffin repeated this stunt several times throughout the group's July tour run. Despite the group hiring extra security to keep Ruffin out, he continued to find ways to sneak into the venue and jump onstage when the group performed one of the songs he had once sung lead on.

In a story recounted several times by Dennis Edwards (rebutted by Otis Williams and the Temptations' road manager Don Foster), after several of these stunts, the positive audience reactions and a remorseful Ruffin's pleas to be let back into the act convinced the other Temptations members to do so. Otis Williams informed the then still-new Edwards that the group would lay him off and rehire Ruffin while in Gaithersburg, Maryland. However, when Ruffin failed to show up on time the next night for his "return" engagement, the group kept Edwards on and ceased to entertain the prospect of rehiring Ruffin.

After Gaithersburg, Ruffin stopped attempting to disrupt the Temptations' concerts and instead turned his attention to the Motown offices back in Detroit. He sued Motown in October 1968, seeking a release from the label, but Motown countersued the singer to keep him from leaving and the case was eventually settled out of court. The settlement required Ruffin to remain with Motown as a solo artist to finish out his contract.

Edwards' first album with the Temptations was Live at the Copa, recorded at the group's return to the Copacabana nightclub. The Temptations debuted in one of the first of a number of collaborations with Diana Ross & the Supremes in 1968. The results included two studio albums: Diana Ross & the Supremes Join the Temptations (1968), which featured Edwards' first studio recordings with the group and the number-two hit single "I'm Gonna Make You Love Me" and "Together". There was also a joint tour and two NBC television specials, TCB (aired December 9, 1968) and G.I.T. on Broadway (aired November 12, 1969).

=== Switch to Psychedelic soul: 1968–1970 ===
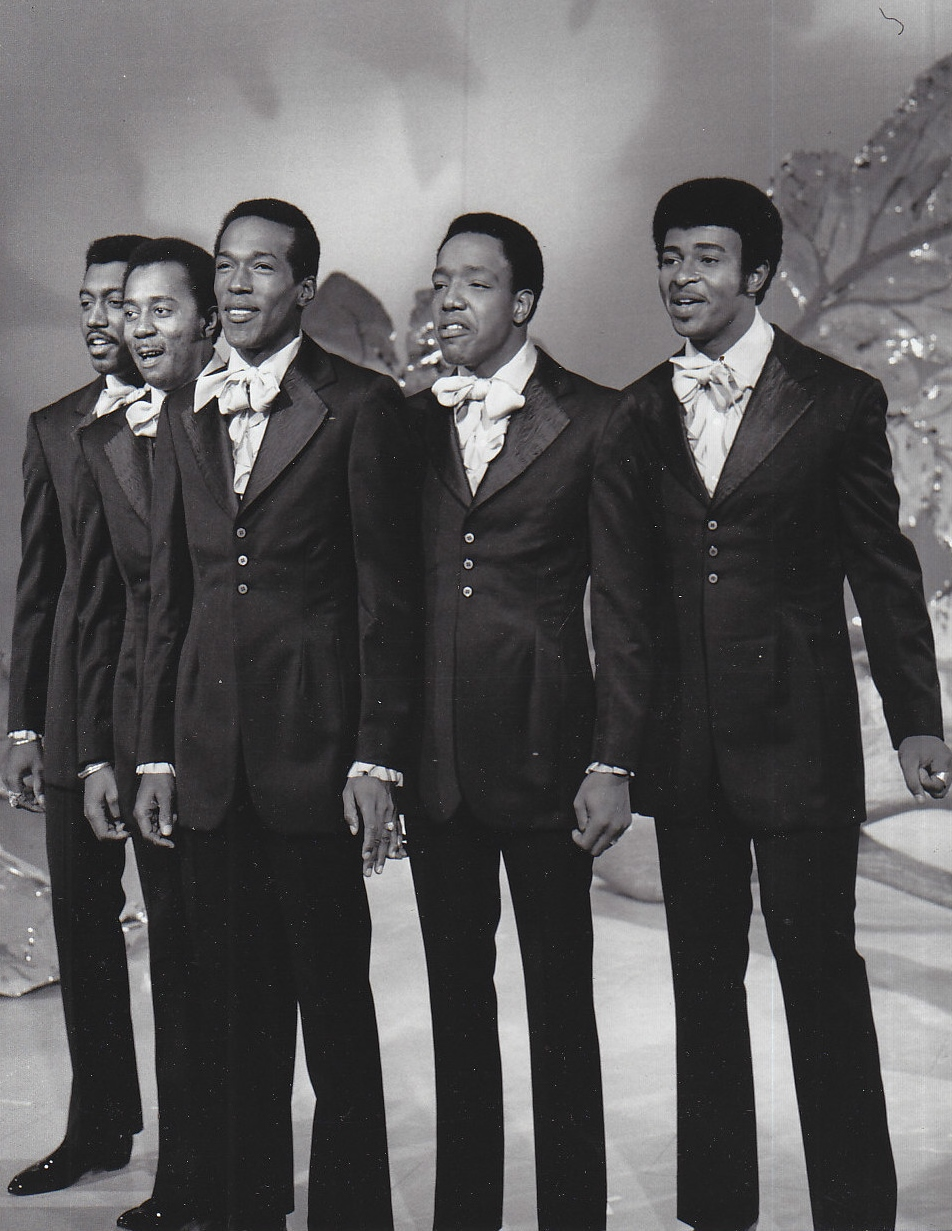
The Temptations perform on The Ed Sullivan Show in September 1969. Left to right: Otis Williams, Melvin Franklin, Eddie Kendricks, Paul Williams, and Dennis Edwards.

The addition of Dennis Edwards to the Temptations coincided with the adoption of a new sound for the group by producer Norman Whitfield, and in the fall of 1968, Whitfield began producing psychedelic-based material for the Temptations, derived primarily from the sound of funk bands as Sly & the Family Stone and Funkadelic. This new style, which debuted with the Top 10 hit single "Cloud Nine" in October 1968, was a marked departure from the David Ruffin-era ballads. The instrumentation was funkier, the beat was hard-driving, and all five Temptations members traded lead vocals, similar to Sly & the Family Stone. "Cloud Nine", the centerpiece of the group's landmark eponymous album, was a Top 10 hit and won Motown its first Grammy Award, for Best R&B Vocal Group Performance of 1969.

The blending of the Motown sound and psychedelic rock sound resulted in a new subgenre of music called psychedelic soul, also evident in the work of Diana Ross and the Supremes ("Reflections", "Love Child"), Marvin Gaye's version of "I Heard It Through the Grapevine", and music of the 5th Dimension, the Undisputed Truth, and the Friends of Distinction. More Temptations psychedelic soul singles followed in 1969 and 1970 - among them "Runaway Child, Running Wild" (a number-one R&B hit), "I Can't Get Next to You" (a number-one pop hit), "Psychedelic Shack", and "Ball of Confusion (That's What the World Is Today)" - but the formula began to wear thin when "Ungena Za Ulimwengu (Unite the World)", only went to no. 33 Pop in the fall of 1970. The group's other important albums from this period included Puzzle People (1969) and Psychedelic Shack (1970). The latter included the original version of "War", later made famous by Edwin Starr.

=== Eddie Kendricks' departure and Paul Williams' retirement: 1970–1971 ===
Paul Williams, who suffered from sickle-cell disease, fell into depression because of the stress of touring and personal issues. By the late 1960s, he had developed a serious case of alcoholism. Having never previously consumed anything stronger than milk, he began to drink quite heavily, and it was hard to take, according to Otis Williams. As his physical and mental health began to decline sharply, it made performing with his bandmates increasingly difficult. Williams began traveling with oxygen tanks, and the other four Temptations members made valiant efforts to raid and drain his alcohol stashes.

In late 1969, Richard Street, lead singer of Motown act the Monitors and a former Distant, was hired by Otis Williams to tour with the group as a backup replacement for Williams. For most shows, save for his solo numbers, Williams danced and lip-synched on stage to parts sung live by Street into an offstage mic behind a curtain. At other shows, and during most of the second half of 1970, Street substituted Williams on stage when he was too sick to go on.

Eddie Kendricks became detached from the group after David Ruffin's firing and as the health of Paul Williams continued to fail. He regularly picked fights with Otis Williams and Melvin Franklin, which often became violent, and in addition, he preferred the ballad material from the earlier days and was uncomfortable with the psychedelic soul material the group was now performing. Kendricks rekindled his friendship with Ruffin, who persuaded him to go solo. He no longer felt he had a say in Otis Williams's handling of the group and was also convinced Motown's handling of the Temptations' finances was cheating the group out of money. Kendricks, being the only member to continue an alliance with Ruffin, also repeatedly suggested that Ruffin should be allowed back into the group, despite the other members' strong objections.

Kendricks lobbied strongly in 1970 to have the Temptations go on "strike" – no performances, no recordings – until Berry Gordy and the Motown staff were willing to go over all group finances with independent accountants. Otis Williams and Franklin strongly opposed this idea, and regular group infighting between Kendricks, Otis Williams, and Franklin grew from this disagreement. After a November 1970 Copacabana engagement, a final confrontation between the three caused Kendricks to walk out in-between shows and not return. Both Kendricks and Williams then agreed that the first would be leaving the group. Kendricks later stated that he actually considered leaving as early as 1965, but remained with the Temptations and unsuccessfully attempted to get permission to record a solo album without leaving the group.

Before Kendricks officially left the Temptations, he and Paul Williams recorded the lead vocals for "Just My Imagination (Running Away with Me)", a ballad that became Kendricks' final single with the group. Included on the Sky's the Limit LP along with the original album version of "Smiling Faces Sometimes", "Just My Imagination" was released as a single in January 1971, and the song began steadily climbing the US pop singles chart, peaking at number 1 two months later. By the time "Just My Imagination" topped the charts, Kendricks had negotiated his release from the group and signed a solo deal with Motown's Tamla label.

Whitfield took the remaining Temptations quartet and re-recorded "It's Summer", the B-side to "Ball of Confusion (That's What the World Is Today)", as a replacement single. "Smiling Faces Sometimes" was released as a single for the Undisputed Truth instead, becoming a Top 5 hit on the Billboard Hot 100 in 1971. Meanwhile, "It's Summer" peaked at number 51 on the Billboard Hot 100, making it the first Temptations single to miss the Top 40 since "Farewell My Love" eight years earlier.

The Temptations originally hired Ricky Owens, from the Los Angeles-based vocal group the Vibrations, to replace Kendricks. However, Owens only played three dates with the group before he was fired for forgetting the words to his solo numbers due to nervousness. For several weeks of the spring of 1971, the Temptations were without a fifth member. Owens returned to the Vibrations and died in Los Angeles, California, on December 6, 1996, at the age of 57.

After his doctor declared a few weeks later that he was unable to continue performing for medical reasons, Paul Williams quit the Temptations in May. Richard Street officially took Williams's place, although Williams continued to be paid his customary one-fifth of group revenue (Street was paid on salary for the first eighteen months of his tenure), and worked when he could with the group as an adviser and choreographer. After Williams had recovered enough to record again, he recorded two sides in 1973 for a debut solo single. However, on August 17, 1973, Williams died in Detroit at the age of 34 from a gunshot wound, his death ruled a suicide by the Wayne County coroner.

=== Another genre change to funk: 1971–1976 ===
In May 1971, the Temptations finally found a permanent replacement for the first tenor position in twenty-year-old Baltimore native Damon Harris. Otis Williams, Edwards, Franklin, Street, and Harris continued recording and performing, and Norman Whitfield continued producing hits for them. There were Top 40 hits such as "Superstar (Remember How You Got Where You Are)" (1971), a message from the Temptations to David Ruffin and Eddie Kendricks, and "Take a Look Around" (1972). During this period, the group toured with Quiet Elegance as their back-up singers. Quiet Elegance featured Lois Reeves, the sister of Martha Reeves, alongside Frankie Gearing and Millie Vaney-Scott. That year, on Thanksgiving Day, the Temptations would make their first appearance in the annual Macy’s Thanksgiving Day Parade singing “Superstar” to promote the upcoming Solid Rock album.

Late 1972 saw the release of "Papa Was a Rollin' Stone", a magnum opus written by Norman Whitfield and Barrett Strong and produced by Whitfield. Originally a three-minute record written and produced for the Undisputed Truth, Whitfield took the somber tune and created a sprawling, dramatic twelve-minute version for the Temptations - a forerunner of the extended single - soon to become popular in clubs and discothèques. An edited seven-minute version was released as a single and became one of the longest hit singles in music history: it hit number 1 on the pop charts and number 5 on the R&B charts. In 1973, "Papa Was a Rollin' Stone" won the Temptations their second Grammy for Best R&B Performance by a Group. Whitfield and arranger/conductor Paul Riser won the award for Best R&B Instrumental Performance for the instrumental version on the B-side, and Whitfield and Barrett Strong won the songwriting Grammy for Best R&B Song.

After "Papa Was a Rollin' Stone", Whitfield stopped working with Barrett Strong, and began writing the Temptations' material on his own. The success of such single led Whitfield to create more elongated, operatic pieces, including the Top 10 hit "Masterpiece" (1973) and several of the tracks on the resulting eponymous album. Tensions developed between Whitfield and the group, who found Whitfield arrogant and difficult to work with. Citing his habitual tardiness, his emphasis of the instrumental tracks at the expense of their vocals on many of his productions, and the declining singles and albums sales as other sources of conflict, the group sought to change producers. Otis Williams complained about Whitfield's actions and the Temptations' stagnant sales to Berry Gordy; as a result, the group was reassigned to Jeffrey Bowen, co-producer of the 1967 In a Mellow Mood album.

The final Norman Whitfield-produced Temptations album, 1990, was released in December 1973, and included the Top 30 single "Let Your Hair Down". Shortly afterwards, Whitfield left Motown, and in 1975 established Whitfield Records, taking with him the Undisputed Truth and Willie Hutch, along with Rose Royce, who recorded in 1976 the hit "Car Wash". The last track Whitfield produced for the group was the single "Let Your Hair Down", released in 1973.

=== Further switch to Adult Contemporary: 1975–1980 ===
Bowen's first LP with the Temptations was January 1975's A Song for You, which included a cover of the titular Leon Russell tune (popularized with soul audiences by Donny Hathaway), along with the pop Top 40/R&B number-one hits "Happy People" (featuring the Commodores as the instrumentalists) and "Shakey Ground" (featuring instrumentation by Parliament-Funkadelic's Eddie Hazel along with Billy Bass Nelson). "Glasshouse", the group's final Top 40 Pop hit, was also included. Damon Harris was fired from the group after making an impromptu speech onstage at the Apollo Theater, as his behavior and work ethic were deemed unprofessional, and his replacement was Washington, D.C. native Glenn Leonard, formerly of the Unifics.

A number of producers, including Bowen, Brian Holland, James Anthony Carmichael, and even the Temptations themselves tried producing hits for the next three LPs, House Party (November 1975), Wings of Love (March 1976), and The Temptations Do the Temptations (August 1976). However, none of these recordings were as commercially successful as A Song for You, and none of their associated singles entered the Billboard charts.

As time progressed, Bowen pushed Dennis Edwards further to the front of the group. This was evident on Wings of Love, where several tracks featured Edwards' vocal more prominently than the other Temptations backing vocals. Otis Williams felt that this was hurting the group, accused Motown of inattention, and cited this as the reason for the group's declining sales and popularity. After The Temptations Do the Temptations was recorded in 1976, Edwards was fired from the group, and with new lead Louis Price on board, they left Motown for Atlantic Records. During the Louis Price period, the group became honorary members of the Phi Beta Sigma fraternity.

Success continued to elude the group at Atlantic, however. Their two releases on Atlantic – Hear to Tempt You (1977), and Bare Back (1978), along with their associated singles - had failed to perform any better at Atlantic than their last handful of singles had at Motown. As a result, in 1979, Atlantic released the group from its contract, and shortly afterwards, the Temptations met once again with Smokey Robinson and Berry Gordy, who re-signed the group to Motown in 1980.

=== Return to Motown Records and Reunion: 1980–1983 ===
Upon the return to Motown several lineup changes occurred. Louis Price departed from the group and joined the Drifters. Dennis Edwards - who had made an unsuccessful attempt at developing a solo career during his three-year exit from the group - returned to the lineup. Berry Gordy co-wrote and produced "Power", the Temptations' first single under the new contract. This song, from the album of the same name, hit no. 11 on the R&B charts but failed to chart in the Top 40. Two years of under-performing singles and albums followed, including an eponymous album with Philadelphia-based producer Thom Bell, until Motown began planning a Temptations reunion tour in 1982.

Eddie Kendricks and David Ruffin agreed to rejoin the group for the new album, aptly titled Reunion, and its subsequent promotional tour. Rick James, the Motown funk star who had previously used the Temptations as backup vocalists on his 1981 hit "Super Freak" and whom Franklin claimed as his nephew, wrote, produced, and guested on the Reunion album's lead single, "Standing on the Top". The single went to no. 6 on the R&B charts and featured Ruffin, Kendricks and Edwards trading back and forth on lead.

While the ensuing Reunion tour with all seven Temptations (Ruffin, Kendricks, Otis Williams, Franklin, Edwards, Richard Street, and Glenn Leonard) was financially successful, it ended up being a stressful venture: Kendricks' voice had weakened after decades of chain smoking, Ruffin (still addicted to drugs) missed a number of the performances due to being incapacitated, and current group members Dennis Edwards and Glenn Leonard were causing problems. At the conclusion of the Reunion tour, Ruffin and Kendricks were dismissed, and they began touring and performing together as a duo.

One more album, Surface Thrills, released in 1983, featured a sharp departure in the group's sound by incorporating elements of then-current rock. Before its release, Glenn Leonard quit and was replaced by Ron Tyson, who was with the Philadelphia groups the Ethics and Love Committee. Tyson had been a staff songwriter at Atlantic during the Temptations' tenure at that label, and co-wrote several songs on the album Hear to Tempt You.

=== Autobiography and induction into the Rock and Roll Hall of Fame: 1983–1989 ===
The Temptations in 1984. From left: Woodson, Franklin, Tyson (bottom), Williams, Street.

By this time, the Temptations' releases were no longer performing well on the pop charts, though some singles still made the R&B Top 20. "Love on My Mind Tonight", a single from Surface Thrills, charted at no. 17.

The lineup of Franklin, Williams, Street, Tyson, and Edwards proved to be short-lived. The five performed on Motown 25 and released the direct to video The Temptations: Live in Concert (filmed at Harrah's Atlantic City). The album Back to Basics, released later in 1983, was the first album featuring Ron Tyson on lead. The song "Sail Away", produced by a returning Norman Whitfield and featuring Ron Tyson's first lead vocal, peaked at no. 13 on the US R&B chart.

In addition, a then-relatively unknown singer/musician, Ali-Ollie Woodson was featured on one track, "Stop the World Right Here (I Wanna Get Off)". Woodson was a Detroit native who had been a potential candidate to replace Dennis Edwards back in 1977. Meanwhile, Edwards (who also had his share of lead vocals on the Back to Basics album) was fired again in 1983, for missing rehearsals or showing up hungover. He then attempted a second solo career, scoring a hit with the 1984 single "Don't Look Any Further", a duet with Siedah Garrett.

At this point, Woodson officially joined the group, taking Edwards' place. Woodson's first lead on a single was 1984's "Treat Her Like a Lady", co-written by himself and Otis Williams, and co-produced by former Earth, Wind & Fire members Al McKay and Ralph Johnson. The song became their biggest success on R&B radio since 1975, reaching number-two on the R&B charts, and just missing the Pop Top 40 at no. 48. The group enjoyed further successes with 1985's "Do You Really Love Your Baby", a no. 14 R&B hit co-written by soul star Luther Vandross, and 1986's "Lady Soul", the group's third Top 10 R&B hit of the decade.

Ali Woodson remained with the Temptations until 1987, when he was fired for consistent lateness. He was replaced by the again-returning Dennis Edwards. The group recorded one album during Edwards' third tenure, Together Again, released later that year. In 1988, Otis Williams published his autobiography, Temptations, co-written with Patricia Romanowski, chronicling the careers of the group from the Primes/Distants days and focusing on the lives of Williams and Melvin Franklin. (An updated version of the book was published in 2002.) Together, they worked on the theme song to the children's educational musical movement series, Kids in Motion created by Greg & Steve.

Edwards left the group for a third and final time in late 1988, with Woodson re-joining the lineup. In 1989, the Temptations released the album Special, which included the soulful singles "Special" and "Soul to Soul". On January 18, 1989, the Temptations were inducted into the Rock and Roll Hall of Fame. The event honored Edwards, Franklin, Otis Williams, Ruffin, Eddie Kendricks (now performing as "Eddie Kendrick"), and, posthumously, Paul Williams. Most of the Temptations, present and former, showed no ill feelings towards each another, although Otis Williams reported that Kendricks refused to speak to him during the ceremony. The Temptations ended their induction ceremony with a performance of Paul Williams' signature song, Don't Look Back, dedicated to his memory.

=== Further recordings and performances: 1990–1998 ===
After reuniting at the induction ceremony, and much to the chagrin of Otis Williams and Motown, Edwards, Ruffin, and Kendrick made plans to tour and record as Ruffin, Kendricks and Edwards, Former Leads of the Temptations. The tour was in fact carried out, but production on the album was canceled when 50-year-old David Ruffin died in Philadelphia after a cocaine overdose on June 1, 1991. Kendricks was diagnosed with lung cancer soon after; he continued to perform until his death on October 5, 1992, in his native Birmingham.

Richard Street missed a performance in 1992 after undergoing emergency surgery to remove kidney stones. Otis Williams, completely unaware of Street's surgery, called him angrily about his absence. Street felt Williams was unsympathetic, and as a result, he left the group in 1993 after twenty-two years. His replacement was St. Louis native Theo Peoples.

By the early 1990s, bassist Melvin Franklin began missing performances due to failing health and Ray Davis, former bass man of Parliament-Funkadelic, began touring as a fill-in during 1993. Franklin died after suffering a brain seizure at the age of 52 on February 23, 1995, and Davis was named his official replacement. The group subsequently finished production on For Lovers Only, an album of pop standards featuring two tracks recorded with Melvin Franklin prior to his death.

However, this lineup did not last, as Davis was diagnosed with lung cancer and left shortly after completing the album. Davis died in New Brunswick, New Jersey of respiratory problems and complications of lung cancer on the evening of Tuesday July 5, 2005.

The group continued as a quartet for a short time before recruiting bassist Harry McGilberry, a former member of the Futures. For Lovers Only was also the last contribution for lead Ali-Ollie Woodson; he was released from the group shortly after McGilberry's hiring due to health problems: he suffered two bouts of throat cancer in a short time.

The Temptations' new lineup, consisting of Otis Williams, Ron Tyson, Theo Peoples, and newcomers Harry McGilberry and Terry Weeks, toured throughout 1997, and was featured in the halftime show of Super Bowl XXXII in early 1998, which celebrated the 40th anniversary of Motown. Later that year, the Temptations released the album Phoenix Rising, vocally arranged by 1980s producer Narada Michael Walden, Isaias Gamboa, Claytoven Richardson, Theo Peoples, Tony Lindsey and Skyler Jett, which became their first million-selling LP in more than 20 years. The album was anchored by "Stay", a single featuring Theo Peoples on lead and including a sample from "My Girl", which became a number-one hit on the urban adult contemporary charts. It was released to extremely positive reviews.

Peoples was fired from the group before the release of Phoenix Rising because of his issues with drug addiction, and was replaced by Barrington "Bo" Henderson. Henderson lip-synched to Peoples' vocals in the "Stay" music video, and the completed album features lead vocals on different tracks by both Henderson and Peoples.

=== TV miniseries: 1998–2001 ===
Also in 1998, three months after the release of Phoenix Rising earlier in the year, de Passe Entertainment (run by former Motown vice-president Suzanne de Passe) and Hallmark Entertainment produced The Temptations, a four-hour television miniseries based on Otis Williams' Temptations autobiography. The miniseries was broadcast in two parts on NBC on November 1 and November 2, 1998, with the first part covering the group's history from 1958 to 1968, and the second part the years from 1968 to 1995. The miniseries was a ratings success and was nominated for five Emmy Awards, with Allan Arkush winning for Best Direction; it was subsequently rerun on the VH-1 cable television network and released to VHS and DVD. The Temptations were inducted into the Vocal Group Hall of Fame in 1999.

Otis Williams' former wife Josephine Miles, Melvin Franklin's mother Rose Franklin, David Ruffin's family, and Johnnie Mae Matthews filed lawsuits against Williams, Motown, de Passe and de Passe Entertainment, Hallmark, and NBC for a number of charges, including defamation.

The lawsuits were consolidated, the judges ruled in favor of the defendants, and the ruling was upheld when the plaintiffs appealed in 2001. Williams later claimed that, although his book was used as the source material for the film, he did not have a great deal of control over how the material was presented.

=== Later decades: 2001–present ===
In 2001, their 2000 album Ear-Resistible won the group its third Grammy, this one for Best Traditional R&B Vocal Performance. Bo Henderson was fired from the group in 2003, prompting a wrongful termination lawsuit.

His replacement was former Spinners lead G. C. Cameron. The lineup of Cameron, Otis Williams, Ron Tyson, Harry McGilberry, and Terry Weeks recorded for a short time before McGilberry was dismissed; his replacement was former Spaniels member Joe Herndon. McGilberry died on April 3, 2006, at the age of 56.

The group's final Motown album, Legacy, was released in 2004. Later that year, the Temptations asked to be released from their Motown contract, and moved to another Universal label, New Door Records. Their sole album with this lineup, Reflections, was released on January 31, 2006, and contains covers of several popular Motown songs, including Diana Ross & the Supremes' "Reflections", the Miracles' "Ooo Baby Baby", Marvin Gaye and Tammi Terrell's "Ain't Nothing Like the Real Thing", and the Jackson 5's "I'll Be There". Dennis Edwards, Ali-Ollie Woodson and David Sea (deep soul singer from Alabama, not David Ruffin) formed the Temptations tribute group "the Temptations Revue featuring Dennis Edwards".

G.C. Cameron left the group in June 2007 to focus on his solo career. He was replaced by Bruce Williamson, who first affiliated with the group a year earlier. The new lineup recorded another album of soul covers, Back to Front, released in October 2007. Former member Ali-Ollie Woodson died on May 30, 2010, after a long battle with leukemia.

On May 4, 2010, the group released another album titled Still Here. The first single from Still Here, "First Kiss", was criticized for having instances of using Auto-Tune technology.

The Temptations received the Grammy Lifetime Achievement Award on February 9, 2013. Otis Williams, Dennis Edwards, and the children of David Ruffin, Eddie Kendricks, Paul Williams, and Melvin Franklin attended the ceremony to accept the six Grammys given to the group for the occasion.

Former member Damon Harris died on February 18, 2013, from prostate cancer at a Baltimore hospital. Nine days later, former member Richard Street died of pulmonary embolism in Las Vegas, Nevada. At the time of his death, Street was in the process of writing a book regarding his time with the Temptations entitled Ball of Confusion: My Life as a Temptin' Temptation. Completed by his co-author, Gary Flanigan, the book was published in 2014; it is the second autobiography regarding the group.

In late 2015 both Bruce Williamson and Joe Herndon announced their departures from the group. Williamson's replacement, Larry Braggs, was lead singer of Tower of Power from 2000 to 2013. Herndon's replacement is Willie Green, who had previously toured with former Temptations members Richard Street and Ali-Ollie Woodson. Dennis Edwards died on February 1, 2018, at age 74. He had been battling with meningitis before his death.

On May 4, 2018, the Temptations released All the Time, their first album since 2010's Still Here, as well as their first for Universal's UMe Direct imprint.

Former member G. C. Cameron substituted an absent Larry Braggs in shows in August 2019. By October 2019 Braggs was no longer a member of the group. They then temporarily toured as a quartet until June 19, 2020, when it was announced that Mario Corbino was the new member of the group replacing Larry Braggs.

On September 6, 2020, former Temptations member Bruce Williamson died at age 49 from COVID-19.

In the fall of 2021, the Temptations released two singles, "Is It Gonna Be Yes Or No", featuring Smokey Robinson, the writer of My Girl, and "When We Were Kings", as part of their upcoming album, Temptations 60. The album is scheduled to be released in January 2022. In December 2021, Otis Williams introduced Tony Grant as the newest member of the Temptations at a concert in Orlando, Florida. Grant, who formerly sang with the Rhythm and blues group Az Yet, and starred in several Tyler Perry stage plays, replaced Mario Corbino.

The band announced in June 2022 that Broadway star Jawan M. Jackson, who was in the musical, was joining on bass, replacing Willie Green.

== Sound ==
The group's sound is characterized by "silky soul vocals and smooth-stepping routines," and has been described as psychedelic soul.

=== Motown soundtrack (1961–68) ===
Following their first Motown hit, the group altered their style several times over the ensuing years, adapting to the popular styles of the day while retaining their signature visual and vocal styles. The earliest Temptations recordings backed by Motown's stalwart studio band, the Funk Brothers, reflect the influence of producers Berry Gordy and Smokey Robinson, and featured a cohesive blend of black Rhythm and blues along with elements of white pop music that later came to be known as the Motown Sound. Recordings made prior to 1966, such as "My Girl", were built-around songs with simple, direct lyrics supported by an R&B rhythm section with orchestral strings and horns added for pop appeal. During this period, each recording usually featured only one lead singer, usually David Ruffin or Eddie Kendricks, although Paul Williams, Melvin Franklin, and Otis Williams each had solo numbers of their own at various times during this period.

In 1966, Norman Whitfield changed the group's dynamic, moving them away from the previous one lead singer model and adding elements derived from the rougher soul of artists such as James Brown, Wilson Pickett, and the performers at Stax Records. Whitfield and his lyricists crafted Temptations songs with shifts of dynamics, syncopated horn stabs, and more intricate harmony arrangements which spotlighted each singer's unique vocal range. Onstage, this change was reflected in the group's use of a custom-made four-headed microphone stand, invented by David Ruffin.

=== Progressive, psychedelic and cinematic soul (1968–73) ===
When Ruffin was replaced by Dennis Edwards, and Sly and the Family Stone became popular, Whitfield again restructured the Temptations' sound, this time driving the group almost completely into a progressive sound, as well a pioneering psychedelic soul. However, ballads in the traditional style of the group were still being recorded as B-sides and album fillers, with the lone exception being "Just My Imagination".

Tracks such as the album version of "Run Away Child, Running Wild" from Cloud Nine, "Take a Stroll Thru Your Mind" from Psychedelic Shack, and "Smiling Faces Sometimes" from Sky's the Limit, all run at least eight minutes. At Whitfield's insistence, a large portion of the additional running time for each song consisted of instrumental passages without vocals. For example, the hit version of their smash 1972 single "Papa Was a Rollin' Stone" was nearly seven minutes, featuring an instrumental intro that was almost two minutes, a rarity for songs of that era.

"Psychedelic soul" soon gave way to "cinematic soul", highlighting a further series of lengthy recordings featuring detailed orchestration, extended instrumental introductions and bridging passages. Often focusing on lyrics about the ghettos and inner cities of black America, these songs were heavily influenced by the work of singer-songwriters Isaac Hayes and Curtis Mayfield.

Unlike Hayes and Mayfield however, the Temptations had no creative control over their recordings, and were in no way fond of the 12- and 13-minute-long songs being forced upon them by Whitfield, whose contributions were the focal point of the Temptations albums such as Solid Rock, All Directions, and particularly Masterpiece.

=== From funk to some disco to adult contemporary music (1974–present) ===
In 1974, after Whitfield was dismissed as the producer for the Temptations, the group altered its sound to accommodate a balance of both up-tempo dance material as well as ballads. The vocal arrangements began to focus again primarily on one lead singer per track, although some leads were still being shared periodically. In addition, the Temptations themselves, after fighting Motown and Berry Gordy for creative control, began to write and produce some of their own material. From this point on, the Temptations focused almost exclusively on songs about romance. However, songs about social issues similar to the recordings made during Whitfield's tenure were periodically produced as well.

The Temptations recordings of the mid-1970s focused significantly on the influences of funk music from artists such as Parliament-Funkadelic and Sly and the Family Stone, and members of both acts contributed significantly to material recorded by the group during this period. Their signature ballad sound, reduced to filler material during much of the Whitfield period, was restored to the lush, full productions of the earlier hits produced by Smokey Robinson. After a brief diversion into disco in the late-1970s, the Temptations settled into a form of an adult contemporary-rooted type of R&B, a style in which they continue to record.

== Legacy and influence ==
The Temptations has inspired many musical groups and artists like the Jackson 5, the Dramatics, Blue Magic, the Beatles, the Rolling Stones, New Edition, Rod Stewart, Bob Dylan and many more.

Jason Ankeny of AllMusic said that the Temptations are "one of Motown's greatest and grittiest vocal groups of the '60s, and pioneers of psychedelic soul during the early '70s." He also said, "Thanks to their impeccable harmonies, a parade of hits, and fine-tuned choreography, the Temptations became the definitive vocal group of the 1960s. [...] They tackled both lush pop and politically charged funk with equal flair, and over time have weathered a steady stream of changes in personnel and consumer tastes with rare dignity and grace."

Berry Gordy insisted that all his acts be equally appealing to both white as well as black audiences, and employed an extensive creative team to help tailor Motown talent for the crossover success he desired. Motown choreographer Cholly Atkins, along with Paul Williams, created the trademark precise and energetic, yet refined, dance steps used by the Temptations onstage. The most famous of these, the Temptation Walk, or Temptation Strut, was adapted from similar moves by the Flamingos and the Vibrations, and, from those two sources, Atkins and Williams crafted the resulting signature dance routine.

Like other similar independent companies of the period, Motown was not a member of the Recording Industry of America, preferring to stay independent and handling their own widely varied distribution through thousands of "Mom & Pop" record stores and small radio stations. As such, hit singles by Motown artists such as the Temptations never achieved official "gold" or "platinum" RIAA certification until after Motown joined the RIAA in 1977.

The Temptations' songs have been covered by scores of musicians, from R&B singers such as Otis Redding ("My Girl"), Bobby Womack ("I Wish It Would Rain") and Luther Vandross ("Since I Lost My Baby"), to white soul and reggae bands such as Rare Earth ("Get Ready"), UB 40 ("The Way You Do and the Things You Do") and the Rolling Stones ("My Girl", "Ain't Too Proud to Beg", "Just My Imagination") and Mick Jagger's collaboration with reggae artist Peter Tosh on ("Don't Look Back"). The Funk Brothers (Motown) recorded "My Girl", "Runaway Child Running Wild", and "Papa Was a Rolling Stone". Hall & Oates performed "My Girl", "The Way You Do the Things You Do" in Live with Ruffin and Kendricks. Marcus Miller covered "Papa Was a Rolling Stone". British rock singer Rod Stewart released a cover of "I'm Losing You" in 1971, and, in 1991, collaborated with the Temptations on the single "The Motown Song". In 2017, the Temptations and Otis Williams' then-protégé, Kyle Maack, recorded a cover of "Treat Her Like a Lady" for Maack's Shaky Ground EP which also included two additional Temptations covers.

In 2004, Rolling Stone magazine ranked the Temptations number 67 on their list of the 100 Greatest Artists of All Time. The Temptations were voted into the Michigan Rock and Roll Legends Hall of Fame in 2005. They received the Lifetime Achievement Grammy Award in 2013. On Saturday August 17, 2013, the Temptations were officially inducted into the R&B Music Hall of Fame at the inaugural ceremony held at the Waetejen Auditorium on the campus of Cleveland State University.

In 2018, the story of the Temptations served as inspiration for the jukebox musical Ain't Too Proud, which opened on Broadway in March 2019. The show was nominated for 11 Tony Awards at the 73rd Tony Awards and won for Best Choreography.

== Group members ==
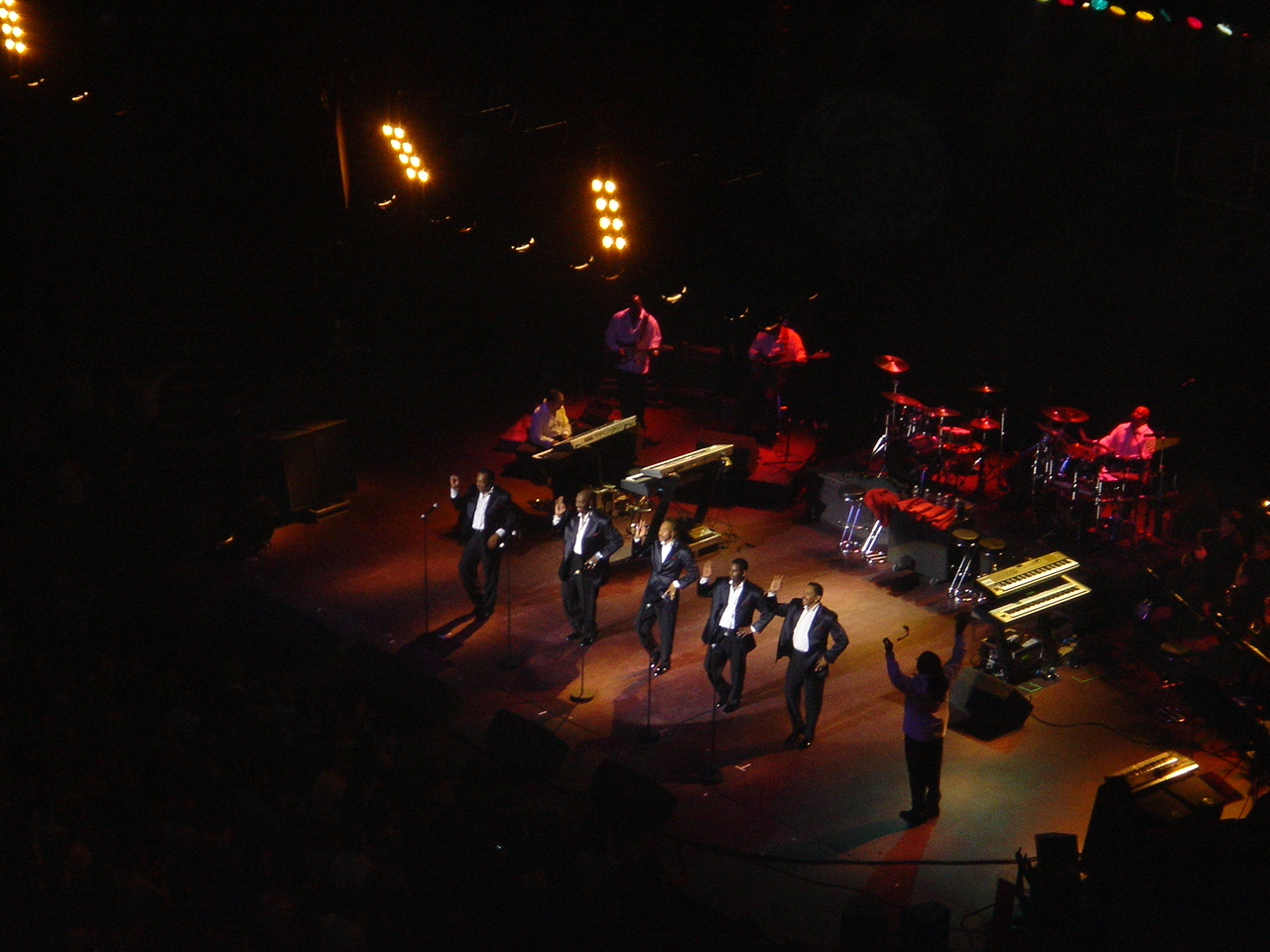
The Temptations on stage at London's Royal Albert Hall, November 2005. Pictured L-R: Joe Herndon, Otis Williams, G.C. Cameron, Terry Weeks, and Ron Tyson.

=== The Temptations ===
Also known as the Elgins (briefly, 1961)

==== Current ====
- Otis Williams (1961–present)
- Ron Tyson (1983–present)
- Terry Weeks (1997–present)
- Tony Grant (2021–present)
- Jawan M. Jackson (2022–present)

==== Former ====
- Melvin Franklin (1961–1995) (d. 1995)
- Eddie Kendricks (1961–1971, 1982 reunion) (d. 1992)
- Paul Williams (1961–1971) (d. 1973)
- Elbridge "Al" Bryant (1961–1963) (d. 1975)
- David Ruffin (1964–1968, 1982 reunion) (d. 1991)
- Dennis Edwards (1968–1976, 1979–1983, 1987–1988) (d. 2018)
- Ricky Owens (1971) (d. 1995)
- Damon Harris (1971–1975) (d. 2013)
- Richard Street (1971–1992) (d. 2013)
- Glenn Leonard (1975–1983)
- Louis Price (1977–1979)
- Ali-Ollie Woodson (1983–1987, 1988–1996; substitute 2002) (d. 2010)
- Theo Peoples (1992–1998)
- Ray Davis (1995) (d. 2005)
- Harry McGilberry (1996–2003) (d. 2006)
- Barrington "Bo" Henderson (1998–2003)
- G. C. Cameron (2003–2007; substitute 2019)
- Joe Herndon (2003–2015)
- Bruce Williamson (2007–2015) (d. 2020)
- Larry Braggs (2016–2019)
- Willie Greene (2016–2022)
- Mario Corbino (2020–2021)

=== The Primes ===
Also known as the Cavaliers' – merged with the Distants

- Paul Williams (1955–1960; died 1973)
- Eddie Kendricks (1955–1960; died 1992)
- Kell Osborne (1955–1960; died 2012)
- Wiley Waller (1955–1957)

=== The Distants ===
Also known as Otis Williams & the Distants, Otis Williams & the Siberians – merged with the Primes

- Otis Williams (1957–60)
- Elbridge "Al" Bryant (1957–60) (d. 1975)
- James "Pee-Wee" Crawford (1957–59)
- Vernard Plain (1957–58)
- Arthur Walton (1957–58)
- Melvin Franklin (1958–60) (d. 1995)
- Richard Street (1958–60) (d. 2013)
- Albert "Mooch" Harrell (1959–60)

== Discography ==
Studio albums

- Meet the Temptations (1964)
- The Temptations Sing Smokey (1965)
- The Temptin' Temptations (1965)
- Gettin' Ready (1966)
- The Temptations with a Lot o' Soul (1967)
- The Temptations in a Mellow Mood (1967)
- The Temptations Wish It Would Rain (1968)
- Diana Ross & the Supremes Join the Temptations (with Diana Ross & the Supremes) (1968)
- Cloud Nine (1969)
- Together (with Diana Ross & the Supremes) (1969)
- Puzzle People (1969)
- Psychedelic Shack (1970)
- The Temptations Christmas Card (1970)
- Sky's the Limit (1971)
- Solid Rock (1972)
- All Directions (1972)
- Masterpiece (1973)
- 1990 (1973)
- A Song for You (1975)
- House Party (1975)
- Wings of Love (1976)
- The Temptations Do the Temptations (1976)
- Hear to Tempt You (1977)
- Bare Back (1978)
- Power (1980)
- The Temptations (1981)
- Reunion (1982)
- Surface Thrills (1983)
- Back to Basics (1983)
- Truly for You (1984)
- Touch Me (1985)
- To Be Continued (1986)
- Together Again (1987)
- Special (1989)
- Milestone (1991)
- For Lovers Only (1995)
- Phoenix Rising (1998)
- Ear-Resistible (2000)
- Awesome (2001)
- Legacy (2004)
- Reflections (2006)
- Back to Front (2007)
- Still Here (2010)
- All the Time (2018)
- Temptations 60 (2022)

== Filmography ==
- 1973: Save the Children
- 1987: Happy New Year
- 1989: Who's Harry Crumb?
- 2007: Walk Hard: The Dewey Cox Story

=== Television work ===
- 1985: The Fall Guy (TV episode Rockabye Baby, February 13, 1985)
- 1985: The Love Boat (TV episode Your Money or Your Wife/Joint Custody/The Temptations, October 5, 1985)
- 1986: Moonlighting (TV episode Symphony in Knocked Flat, October 21, 1986)
- 1986: 227 (TV episode Temptations, November 15, 1986)
- 1990: Murphy Brown (TV episode Goin' to the Chapel, Part 2, May 21, 1990)
- 1990: performed CBS network's 1990–91 version of their "Get Ready" campaign with an updated version of Get Ready.
- 1993: Getting By (TV episode Reach for the Stars, November 23, 1993)
- 1996: New York Undercover (TV episode Deep Cover, May 2, 1996)
- 2008: Friday Night with Jonathan Ross (TV appearance), March 7, 2008
- 2012: Dancing with the Stars (TV appearance), April 23, 2012 – Motown Week
- 2024: Today Show (TV appearance), December 16, 2024

=== Video and DVD releases ===
- 1991: The Temptations – Live in Concert
- 2004: 20th Century Masters – The Best of the Temptations
- 2006: Get Ready: The Definitive Performances – 1965–1972
- 2007: The Temptations – Live In London (1987)

== General bibliography ==
- George, Nelson (1994). "Cool as They Wanna Be". The Temptations: Emperors of Soul (CD box set). New York: Motown Record Co., L.P.
- George, Nelson (1985, rev. 2003). Where Did Our Love Go: The Rise and Fall of the Motown. London: Omnibus Press. ISBN 0-7119-9511-7.
- Posner, Gerald (2002). Motown : Music, Money, Sex, and Power. New York: Random House. ISBN 0-375-50062-6.
- Ribowsky, Mark (2010). Ain't Too Proud to Beg: The Troubled Lives and Enduring Soul of the Temptations. Hoboken, New Jersey: John Wiley & Sons.ISBN 978-0-470-26117-0.
- Weinger, Harry (1994). "Sunshine on a Cloudy Day". The Temptations: Emperors of Soul (CD Box Set). New York: Motown Record Co., L.P.
- Williams, Otis and Romanowski, Patricia (1988, updated 2002). Temptations. Lanham, MD: Cooper Square. ISBN 0-8154-1218-5.
