= Harry McGilberry =

American musician

Harry McGilberry (January 19, 1950 – April 3, 2006) was an American R&B and soul singer and latter-day bass singer for The Temptations between 1995 and 2003.

== Biography ==
Born Harry McGilberry Jr. in Philadelphia, Pennsylvania on January 19, 1950, McGilberry was a member of the R&B group The Futures and later the Temptations, replacing ailing bassist and former P-Funk member Ray Davis. He joined the quintet in 1995 and recorded the albums Phoenix Rising, Ear-Resistible and Awesome with them.

McGilberry was fired from the group in 2003 by Temptations leader Otis Williams for a reported drug habit (he was replaced by Joe Herndon of The Spaniels). He later joined a Temptations splinter group, 'The Temptations Experience', replacing the then recently departed Ray Davis.

== Death and interment ==
McGilberry died of an apparent drug overdose on April 3, 2006 at the age of 56.

He’s buried beside his mother at Eden Cemetery in Pennsylvania.
