= Bruce Williamson (singer) =

American singer-songwriter and country folk musician (1970–2020)

- Born: Bruce Alan Williamson Jr. September 29, 1970; Los Angeles, California, U.S.
- Died: September 6, 2020 (aged 49) Las Vegas, Nevada, U.S.
- Occupation: Singer
- Instrument: Vocals
- Formerly of: Temptations

Bruce Alan Williamson Jr. (September 29, 1970 – September 6, 2020) was an American R&B and soul singer and a one-time lead singer for The Temptations.

== Career ==
Williamson had shown interest in joining the legendary Temptations music group since 1994. In an effort to help sign a fellow Vegas group to a label, Williamson's manager Dave Wallace introduced Williamson to long-time Temptations vocalist Ron Tyson. After listening to Williamson sing, Tyson mentored him and tried to have Williamson become a member of the Temptations for over a decade. Williamson later explained, "Otis Williams was initially against me joining the group, because he thought I was too big and too young," but Williams eventually relented allowing him to enter the group.

Many of the Temptations' fans learned of Williamson's entry after former member G.C. Cameron told a New York City radio station that he was leaving the group to continue his solo career. Williamson has been quoted as saying that he had done "more in six months of being a Temptation than many artists have done in a lifetime." Williamson appeared on the group's recent albums, Back to Front and Still Here, and participated in many public events with the Temptations, including countless concerts, TV appearances, and a cameo in Walk Hard: The Dewey Cox Story.

Williamson left the Temptations in 2015, citing weight problems and wanting to record a gospel album. He was replaced by former Tower of Power vocalist Larry Braggs.

== Personal life and death ==
Born and raised in Los Angeles, California, on September 29, 1970, Bruce started singing in church at a young age. Williamson's love for music began after experiencing jealousy over his cousin's frequent choir leads. Having sung gospel music for most of his life, he also began singing R&B music in local clubs. Williamson later took his talent to the famous Las Vegas Strip, fronting the popular cover, funk band, BlackBerry Jam.

In August 2020, Williamson was diagnosed with COVID-19 during the COVID-19 pandemic in Nevada after having recovered from gall bladder surgery. He died from complications of COVID-19 in Las Vegas on September 6, 2020, at age 49. At the time of his death, Williamson was working on R&B and gospel albums, one of which was with a reloaded BlackBerry Jam band entitled Send the Rain.
