= Joe Herndon =

Walter Gregory Herndon
- Born: January 5, 1949 (age 77); Washington. D.C., U.S.
- Genres: Soul
- Occupation: Singer

Walter Gregory "Joe" Herndon (born January 5, 1949) is an American R&B and soul singer, former bass singer of a version of doo-wop group The Spaniels and former bass singer for The Temptations (2003–2015).

== Biography ==
He remained a member of the group alongside Otis Williams, Bruce Williamson, Ron Tyson and Terry Weeks until his departure in 2015 and he was replaced by Willie Green.
