= Barrington "Bo" Henderson =

American musician (born 1956)

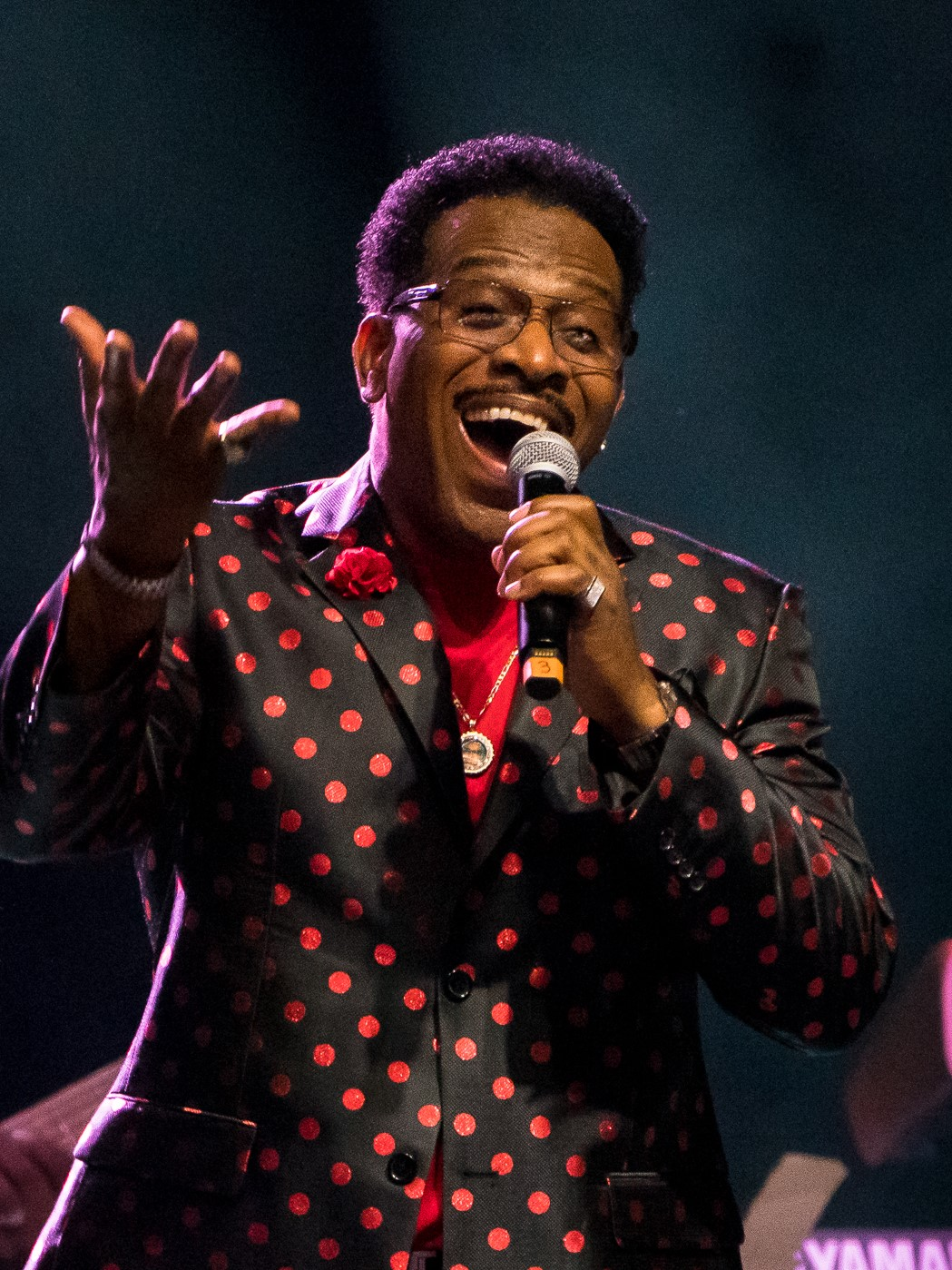
- Henderson in 2019

Background information
- Born: Barrington Scott Henderson; June 10, 1956 (age 70); Washington, Pennsylvania, U.S.
- Genres: R&B, soul
- Occupation: Recording artist
- Instrument: Vocals
- Years active: 1986–present

Barrington Scott "Bo" Henderson (born June 10, 1956) is an American R&B singer.

== Biography ==
Barrington's mother, Joyce St. Amie, was an electric jazz singer. Barrington grew up in the music industry, travelling with his mother and stepfather, James Vaughn, a noted jazz pianist which left him with several Vaughn siblings. Barrington began playing the drums as a pre-teen.

He has been a member of the R&B group Lakeside, and was a member of The Dramatics for a year before becoming a lead singer of The Temptations from 1998 to 2003. Henderson replaced Theo Peoples as one of the group's lead singers. Henderson left The Temptations in 2003.

Henderson's first solo album, Best Kept Secret, was released in 2003. He continued to tour, sometimes performing with fellow ex-Temptation such as Glenn Leonard and working on his second album tentatively titled Bodacious until he replaced Eban Brown as lead singer of The Stylistics. He currently resides in Las Vegas.
