= Ali-Ollie Woodson =

American R&B musical artist (1951–2010)

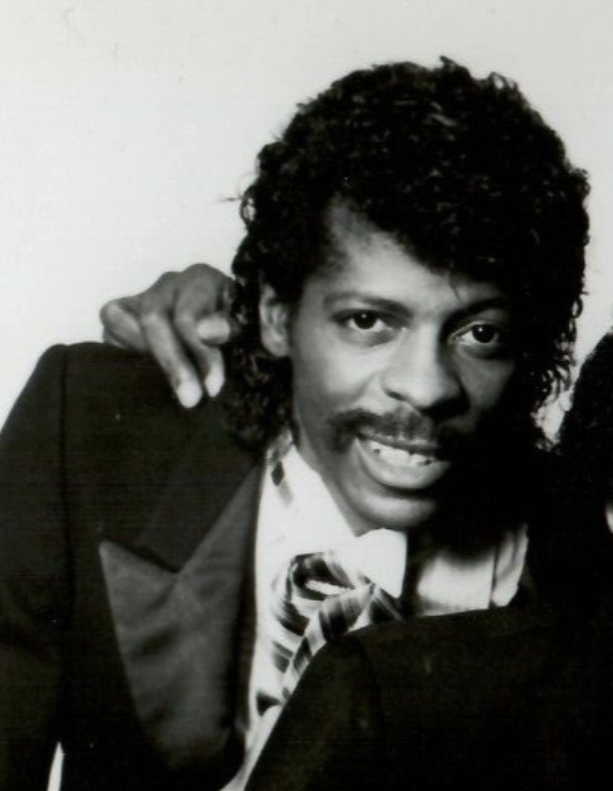
- Woodson in 1984

Background information
- Born: Ollie Creggett; September 12, 1951; Detroit, Michigan, U.S.
- Origin: Town Creek, Alabama, U.S.
- Died: May 30, 2010 (aged 58) Los Angeles, California
- Genres: R&B, pop, soul
- Occupations: Singer, songwriter, keyboardist
- Instruments: Vocals, keyboards, Drums
- Years active: 1970–2010
- Label: Motown
- Formerly of: the Temptations, the Temptations Review Featuring Dennis Edwards

Ali-Ollie Woodson (born Ollie Creggett; September 12, 1951 – May 30, 2010) was an American R&B singer, musician, songwriter, keyboardist, drummer, and occasional actor best known for his twelve years with the Temptations alongside Otis Williams. He also worked with Aretha Franklin, Jean Carn, and Bill Pinkney.

== Early life and career ==
Woodson was born on September 12, 1951, in Detroit, Michigan, and was raised in Town Creek, Alabama.

Woodson was best known as the lead singer of Motown act the Temptations from 1983 to 1987, and from 1988 to 1996. He had first recorded with the Temptations in 1983 on their Back to Basics album, when he was invited to perform lead vocals on the album track, "Stop the World Right Here (I Wanna Get Off)", filling in for Dennis Edwards.

== Illness and death ==
According to his testimony at a televised religious service, Woodson was first diagnosed with throat cancer during one of his tenures with The Temptations. Woodson would again need to undergo surgery when the cancer returned two years later and another two years following that surgery. In late 2008, Woodson was diagnosed with leukemia and hospitalized for several weeks. He died in Los Angeles, California on May 30, 2010, after having leukemia for nearly eighteen months.
