= List of songs written by Norman Whitfield =

This is a list of songs written by Norman Whitfield, either as a sole writer or with others

== Chart hits and other notable songs written by Norman Whitfield ==
Year	Song	Original artist	Co-writer(s) with Whitfield	^{U.S. Pop}	^{U.S. R&B}	^{UK Singles Chart}	Other charting versions, and notes
1962	"Pride and Joy"	Marvin Gaye	Marvin Gaye, William "Mickey" Stevenson	10	2	-	
1962	"Wherever I Lay My Hat (That's My Home)"	Marvin Gaye	Marvin Gaye, Barrett Strong	-	-	-	1983: Paul Young, #70 pop, #1 UK
1964	"The Girl's Alright with Me"	The Temptations	Eddie Holland Jr., Eddie Kendricks	-	39	-	1980: Masterpiece, #81 R&B
1964	"Girl (Why You Wanna Make Me Blue)"	The Temptations	Eddie Holland Jr.	26	11	-	
1964	"Needle in a Haystack"	The Velvelettes	William "Mickey" Stevenson	45	31	-	
1964	"Too Many Fish in the Sea"	The Marvelettes	Eddie Holland Jr.	25	5	-	1966: Mitch Ryder & the Detroit Wheels, #24 pop
1965	"He Was Really Sayin' Somethin'"	The Velvelettes	Eddie Holland Jr., William "Mickey" Stevenson	64	21	-	1982: Bananarama, #5 UK
1965	"Everybody Needs Love"	The Temptations	Eddie Holland Jr.	-	-	-	1967: Gladys Knight & the Pips, #39 pop, #3 R&B
1966	"Ain't Too Proud to Beg"	The Temptations	Eddie Holland Jr.	13	1	21	1974: The Rolling Stones, #17 pop 1989: Rick Astley, #89 pop
1966	"Beauty Is Only Skin Deep"	The Temptations	Eddie Holland Jr.	3	1	18	1989: Aswad, #31 UK
1966	"(I Know) I'm Losing You"	The Temptations	Eddie Holland Jr., Cornelius Grant	8	1	19	1970: Rare Earth, #7 pop, #20 R&B; 1971: Rod Stewart and the Faces, #24 pop 1986: Uptown, #87 pop
1967	"Gonna Give Her All the Love I've Got"	Jimmy Ruffin	Barrett Strong	29	14	26	1969: Marvin Gaye (#67 pop, #27 R&B)
1967	"Don't You Miss Me a Little Bit Baby"	Jimmy Ruffin	Barrett Strong, Rodger Penzabene	68	27	-	
1967	"You're My Everything"	The Temptations	Cornelius Grant, Rodger Penzabene	6	3	-	
1967	"(Loneliness Made Me Realize) It's You That I Need "	The Temptations	Eddie Holland Jr.	14	3	-	
1967	"I Heard It Through the Grapevine"	Gladys Knight & the Pips	Barrett Strong	2	1	47	1968: King Curtis & The Kingpins, #83 pop 1968: Marvin Gaye, #1 pop, #1 R&B, #1 UK; 1974: Marvin Gaye, #53 UK (reissue); 1976: Creedence Clearwater Revival, #43 pop 1981: Roger, #79 pop, #1 R&B; 1986: Edwin Starr, #83 UK; 1986: Marvin Gaye, #8 UK (reissue); 1988: The California Raisins, #84 pop
1968	"I Wish It Would Rain"	The Temptations	Barrett Strong, Rodger Penzabene	4	1	45	1968: Gladys Knight & the Pips, #41 pop, #15 R&B; 1973: The Faces, #8 UK
1968	"The End of Our Road"	Gladys Knight & the Pips	Barrett Strong, Rodger Penzabene	15	5	-	1970: Marvin Gaye, #40 pop, #7 R&B
1968	"I Could Never Love Another (After Loving You)"	The Temptations	Barrett Strong, Rodger Penzabene	13	1	47	
1968	"It Should Have Been Me"	Gladys Knight & the Pips	William "Mickey" Stevenson	14	3	-	1976: Yvonne Fair, #85 pop, #5 UK; 1991: Adeva, #48 UK
1968	"Please Return Your Love to Me"	The Temptations	Barrett Strong	26	4	-	
1968	"Cloud Nine"	The Temptations	Barrett Strong	6	2	15	1969: Mongo Santamaria, #32 pop, #33 R&B
1969	"Runaway Child, Running Wild"	The Temptations	Barrett Strong	6	1	-	
1969	"Too Busy Thinking About My Baby"	Marvin Gaye	Barrett Strong, Janie Bradford	4	1	5	1969: The Billy Mitchell Group, #49 R&B; 1970: The Young Vandals, #46 R&B; 1972: Mardi Gras, #19 UK
1969	"Don't Let the Joneses Get You Down"	The Temptations	Barrett Strong	20	2	-	
1969	"I Can't Get Next to You"	The Temptations	Barrett Strong	1	1	13	1970: Al Green, #60 pop, #11 R&B
1969	"Message from a Black Man"	The Temptations	Barrett Strong	-	-	-	1970: The Whatnauts, #99 pop, #19 R&B
1969	"That's the Way Love Is"	Marvin Gaye	Barrett Strong	7	2	-	
1969	"Friendship Train"	Gladys Knight & the Pips	Barrett Strong	17	2	-	
1969	"Don't Let Him Take Your Love from Me"	The Four Tops	Barrett Strong	45	25	-	
1970	"How Can I Forget"	Marvin Gaye	Barrett Strong	41	18	-	
1970	"Psychedelic Shack"	The Temptations	Barrett Strong	7	2	33	
1970	"You Need Love Like I Do (Don't You)"	Gladys Knight & the Pips	Barrett Strong	25	3	-	2000: Tom Jones and Heather Small, #24 UK
1970	"Ball of Confusion (That's What the World Is Today) "	The Temptations	Barrett Strong	3	2	7	
1970	"War"	Edwin Starr	Barrett Strong	1	3	3	1986: Bruce Springsteen & The E Street Band (live), #8 pop, #18 UK
1970	"Ungena Za Ulimwengu (Unite the World)"	The Temptations	Barrett Strong	33	8	-	
1970	"I Gotta Let You Go"	Martha Reeves and the Vandellas		93	43	-	
1970	"Stop the War Now"	Edwin Starr	Barrett Strong	26	5	33	
1971	"Just My Imagination (Running Away with Me)"	The Temptations	Barrett Strong	1	1	8	1984: Lillo Thomas, #79 R&B; 1998: The McGanns, #59 UK; 2008: Boyz II Men, #83 R&B
1971	"Save My Love for a Rainy Day"	The Undisputed Truth	Rodger Penzabene	-	43	-	
1971	"Funky Music Sho' 'Nuff Turns Me On"	Edwin Starr	Barrett Strong	64	6	-	1972: The Temptations, #27 R&B; 1974: Yvonne Fair, #32 R&B; 2000: The Utah Saints, #23 UK
1971	"Smiling Faces Sometimes "	The Undisputed Truth	Barrett Strong	3	2	-	
1971	"It's Summer"	The Temptations	Barrett Strong	51	29	-	
1971	"Superstar (Remember How You Got Where You Are) "	The Temptations	Barrett Strong	18	8	32	
1971	"You Make Your Own Heaven and Hell Right Here on Earth "	The Undisputed Truth	Barrett Strong	72	24	-	
1972	"What It Is"	The Undisputed Truth	Barrett Strong	71	35	-	
1972	"Take a Look Around"	The Temptations	Barrett Strong	30	10	13	
1972	"Papa Was a Rollin' Stone"	The Undisputed Truth	Barrett Strong	63	24	-	1972: The Temptations, #1 pop, #5 R&B, #14 UK; 1982: Wolf, #55 pop, #47 R&B; 1987: The Temptations (remix) #31 UK; 1990: Was (Not Was), #60 R&B, #12 UK
1973	"Masterpiece"	The Temptations		7	1	53	
1973	"Mama I Got a Brand New Thing (Don't Say No)"	Jackson 5		46	46	-	
1973	"Law of the Land"	The Undisputed Truth		-	40	-	1973: The Temptations, #41 UK
1973	"The Plastic Man"	The Temptations		40	8	-	
1973	"Hey Girl (I Like Your Style) "	The Temptations		35	2	-	
1973	"Hum Along and Dance"	Rare Earth	Barrett Strong	-	95	-	
1973	"You've Got My Soul on Fire"	Edwin Starr		-	40	54	
1973	"Let Your Hair Down"	The Temptations		27	1	-	
1974	"Heavenly"	The Temptations		43	8	-	
1974	"You've Got My Soul on Fire"	The Temptations		74	8	-	
1974	"Help Yourself"	The Undisputed Truth		63	19	-	
1974	"I'm a Fool for You"	The Undisputed Truth		-	39	-	
1974	"Walk Out the Door If You Wanna"	Yvonne Fair		-	60	-	
1975	"UFO's"	The Undisputed Truth		-	62	-	
1975	"Love Ain't No Toy"	Yvonne Fair		-	96	-	1987: Amii Stewart, #99 UK
1975	"Higher Than High"	The Undisputed Truth		-	77	-	
1976	"Car Wash"	Rose Royce		1	1	9	1988: Rose Royce, #20 UK (reissue); 1998: Rose Royce, #18 UK (reissue)
1976	"You Gotta Believe"	The Pointer Sisters		-	14	-	
1977	"Put Your Money Where Your Mouth Is"	Rose Royce		-	-	44	
1977	"You + Me = Love"	The Undisputed Truth		48	37	43	1989: The Funky Worm, "U + Me = Love", #46 UK
1977	"Let's Go Down to the Disco"	The Undisputed Truth		48	68	-	
1977	"I Wanna Get Next to You"	Rose Royce		10	3	14	1998: Christión, #32 R&B
1977	"I'm Going Down"	Rose Royce		70	10	-	1995: Mary J. Blige, #22 pop, #13 R&B, #12 UK
1977	"Do Your Dance"	Rose Royce	Dwight Turner	39	4	30	
1977	"Ooh Boy"	Rose Royce		72	3	-	1980: Rose Royce, #46 UK (reissue)
1978	"All American Funkathon"	Willie Hutch	Willie Hutch	-	62	-	
1978	"Theme Song from Which Way Is Up?"	Stargard		21	1	19	
1978	"It Makes You Feel Like Dancin'"	Rose Royce		-	-	15	
1978	"What You Waiting For"	Stargard		-	4	39	
1979	"First Come, First Serve"	Rose Royce		-	65	-	
1979	"Show Time"	The Undisputed Truth		-	55	-	
1979	"I'm in Love (And I Love the Feeling)"	Rose Royce		-	5	51	
1980	"Pop Your Fingers"	Rose Royce		-	60	-	
1981	"Golden Touch"	Rose Royce	Mark Kenoly, Walter Downing	-	56	-	
1981	"High on the Boogie"	Stargard		-	70	-	
1981	"R.R. Express"	Rose Royce		-	-	52	
1982	"1990"	Dr. America		-	51	-	
1983	"Ready for Some Action "	June Pointer		-	28	-	
1983	"Miss Busy Body (Get Your Body Busy) "	The Temptations	Angelo Bond	-	67	-	
1984	"Sail Away"	The Temptations	Angelo Bond	54	13	-	
1989	"I'm Gonna Git You Sucka "	The Gap Band	William Bryant II	-	14	63	
