= Law of the Land (album) =

Studio album by the Undisputed Truth
- Released: 1973
- Recorded: 1971–1973
- Genres: Soul; psychedelic soul; funk
- Length: 42:11
- Labels: Gordy (Motown) (G 963L)
- Producer: Norman Whitfield

The Undisputed Truth chronology
Face to Face With the Truth (1972)	Law of the Land (1973)	Down to Earth (1974)

Singles from Law of the Land
- 1. "Papa Was a Rollin' Stone" Released: May 9, 1972; 2. "Girl, You're Alright" Released: October 10, 1972; 3. "Law of the Land" Released: June 5, 1973; 4. "Mama I Got a Brand New Thing (Don't Say No)" Released: February 15, 1973

Law of the Land is the third album by the Norman Whitfield's Motown group The Undisputed Truth.

== Details ==
Law of the Land was the last Undisputed Truth album recorded by the group's original line-up, as founding members Billie Rae Calvin and Brenda Joyce Evans would leave shortly after its release. Joe Harris would then be joined by four new members, Virginia "V" McDonald, Tyrone "Big Ty" Douglas, Tyrone "Lil Ty" Barkeley and Calvin "Dhaak" Stephenson, all of whom had been part of The Magictones, a local Detroit soul group.

Like other early Undisputed Truth albums, Law of the Land mostly contains songs that had already been recorded by other artists. The album features covers of Roberta Flack's "Killing Me Softly With His Song", The Beatles' "With A Little Help From My Friends", Traffic's "Feelin' Alright" and Dionne Warwick's "Walk On By". Law of the Land also contains the original version of "Papa Was A Rollin' Stone" (US #63, US R&B #24), which Norman Whitfield rerecorded into a huge hit for his other group, The Temptations. The album's title track was also recorded by both The Temptations and The Undisputed Truth; The Tempts' version was released as a UK-only single in 1973, and just missed out on the UK Top 40, reaching #41, while The Undisputed Truth's version was a minor R&B hit in America, peaking at #40. The album also includes two other minor R&B hits, "Girl, You're Alright" (#43) and "Mama, I Got A Brand New Thing (Don't Say No)" (#46).

== Track listing ==
1. "Law of the Land" (Norman Whitfield) – 4:26
2. "Papa Was a Rollin' Stone" (Norman Whitfield, Barrett Strong) – 3:28
3. "Girl You're Alright" (Clay McMurray, Pam Sawyer) – 2:58
4. "Killing Me Softly with His Song" (Charles Fox, Norman Gimbel) – 4:52
5. "Just My Imagination" (Norman Whitfield, Barrett Strong) – 3:44
6. "This Child Needs Its Father" (Dino Fekaris) – 3:27
7. "Mama I Gotta Brand New Thing (Don't Say No)" (Norman Whitfield) – 3:33
8. "Feelin' Alright" (Dave Mason) – 4:55
9. "Love and Happiness" (Al Green, Mabon Hodges) – 3:15
10. "With a Little Help from My Friends" (Paul McCartney, John Lennon) – 4:25
11. "If I Die" (Peter Rivera) – 3:15
12. "Walk On By" (Burt Bacharach, Hal David) – 3:57

== Personnel ==
- Billy Cooper, Eddie Willis, Joe Messina, Melvin Ragin, Paul Warren, Robert Ward, Robert White – guitar
- Aaron Smith, Andrew Smith, Richard "Pistol" Allen, Uriel Jones – drums
- Earl Van Dyke – piano
- Bob Babbitt – bass guitar
- Johnny Griffith – organ
- Eddie "Bongo" Brown – congas
- Jack Ashford, Jack Brokensha – percussion
- Paul Riser – conductor and arranger

== Charts ==
=== Album ===
Weekly chart performance for Law of the Land
Chart (1973)	Peak position
Billboard Pop Albums	191
Billboard Top Soul Albums	52

=== Singles ===
Chart performance for singles from Law of the Land
Year	Single	Chart positions	
Year	Single	US	US R&B
1972	"Girl, You're Alright"	—	43
1972	"Papa Was a Rollin' Stone"	63	24
1973	"Law of the Land"	—	40
1973	"Mama I Gotta Brand New Thing (Don't Say No)"	—	46
