= The Undisputed Truth (disambiguation) =

The Undisputed Truth is an American music group.

The Undisputed Truth may also refer to:

- The Undisputed Truth (Undisputed Truth album), 1971
- The Undisputed Truth (Brother Ali album), 2007
- The Undisputed Truth (Seventh Star album), 2007
