= Down to Earth (The Undisputed Truth album) =

Studio album by The Undisputed Truth
- Released: 1974
- Recorded: 1974
- Studio: Motown Recording Studios, Hollywood, California
- Genre: Soul, psychedelic soul, funk, disco
- Label: Gordy (Motown); G6 968
- Producer: Norman Whitfield

The Undisputed Truth chronology
Law of the Land (1973)	Down to Earth (1974)	Cosmic Truth (1975)

Down to Earth is the fourth album by psychedelic soul group The Undisputed Truth.

== Details ==
Original Undisputed Truth members Billie Rae Calvin and Brenda Joyce Evans left shortly before the recording of this album, and the group's producer, Norman Whitfield, took the opportunity to expand the group. Founding member and male lead singer Joe Harris was joined by Virginia "V" McDonald, Tyrone "Big Ty" Douglas, Tyrone "Lil Ty" Barkeley and Calvin "Dhaak" Stephenson, all of whom had been part of The Magictones, a local Detroit soul group.

The first six tracks on the album were recorded by this new line-up. The leads (except for "Just You 'N' Me", which is sung by Tyrone Barkley) are handled by Joe Harris and Virginia "V" McDonald (or "Vee") while the other members provide backing vocals. The last four tracks were recorded by the original line-up, and had already found release as album tracks on previous Undisputed Truth LPs and/or as singles.

Although Down To Earth made a good showing on the R&B Album Charts (#35), it failed to crossover to the Billboard Pop Charts like The Truth's previous LPs had done. The album's lead single, "Help Yourself", was released in early 1974, and the group then appeared on Soul Train to promote it. The song became The Undisputed Truth's biggest hit since 1971's "Smiling Faces Sometimes" (US #3, US R&B #2), making #63 on the Pop Charts and #19 on the R&B Charts (their second and last Top 20 R&B hit). A second single, "I'm A Fool For You", also made #39 on the Soul Charts.

Subsequent Undisputed Truth albums would consist only of material recorded by the group's new line-up, and new member Tyrone Barkley would also be given more leads alongside Joe Harris.

== Track listing ==
1. "Help Yourself" (Norman Whitfield) 3:15
2. "Big John Is My Name" (Norman Whitfield) 4:38
3. "Brother Louie" (Errol Brown, Tony Wilson) 3:28
4. "I'm a Fool For You" (Norman Whitfield) 3:02
5. "Our Day Will Come" (Bob Hilliard, Mort Garson) 2:37
6. "Just You 'N' Me" (James Pankow) 2:50
7. "Love and Happiness" (Al Green, Mabon Hodges) 3:08
8. "Law of the Land" (Norman Whitfield) 4:30
9. "The Girl's Alright With Me" (Eddie Kendricks, Eddie Holland, Norman Whitfield) 3:34
10. "Save My Love For a Rainy Day" (Norman Whitfield, Roger Penzabene) 4:00

== Personnel ==
- Mark Davis, Paul Riser - conductor, arranger
- Bob Babbitt, Eddie Watkins, James Jamerson - bass
- Jack Brokensha - percussion
- Bobbye Hall, Eddie "Bongo" Brown - bongos, congas
- Aaron Smith, Andrew Smith, Ed Greene, James Gadson, Richard "Pistol" Allen, Uriel Jones - drums
- Art Stewart, Bob Robitaille, Cal Harris, Larry Miles, Russ Terrana - engineer
- Billy Cooper, Eddie Willis, Joe Messina, Melvin "Wah Wah" Ragin, Paul Warren, Robert Ward, Robert White - guitar
- Johnny Griffith, Mark Davis - organ
- Jack Ashford - tambourine
- Earl Van Dyke, Mark Davis - piano
- Norman Whitfield - producer

== Charts ==
=== Album ===
Chart (1974)	Peak position
Billboard Pop Albums	—
Billboard Top Soul Albums	35

=== Singles ===
Year	Single	Chart positions	
Year	Single	US	US R&B
1974	"Help Yourself"	63	19
1974	"I'm A Fool For You"	—	35
