= Motown Remixed =

Remix album by Various Artists
- Released: May 24, 2005
- Genre: Funk, soul
- Label: Motown/Universal Records

Various Artists chronology
Motown Remixed (2005)	Motown Remixed, Vol. 2 (2007)

Motown Remixed is a 2005 compilation album containing remixed versions of Motown hits, released on May 24, 2005 by Motown/Universal Records.

Several hip hop and dance producers, including Z-Trip, DJ Jazzy Jeff, the Randy Watson Experience, Salaam Remi, Groove Boutique (a.k.a. DJ Rafe Gomez and David Baron), and Easy Mo Bee, took hit records by the Jackson 5, the Temptations, the Supremes, and others, and re-imagined them in new styles. The Jackson 5's "ABC", for example, is re-imagined by Salaam Remi as a crunk song, Smokey Robinson's Quiet Storm is presented by Groove Boutique as a lush, chilled out jazzy jam, and Tranzition takes the Supremes' up-tempo "My World is Empty Without You" and transforms it into a ballad.

The iTunes Music Store version has several additional remixes in the album. Furthermore, the UK, European and Australian releases each have a few remixes that were not included on the US edition and are marked with an asterisk [*] below. An accompanying compilation, Motown Unmixed, features each track in its original version.

In 2007, a follow-up album Motown Remixed, Volume 2 was released.

Also in 2011, the second follow-up album, re-titled Love Motown Remixed, actually Motown Remixed Volume 3, was released only in Japan featuring 12 local remixes. Unlike the designs for the covers of volume 1 and 2, volume 3's cover features the logo "Love Motown Remixed" and a picture of Michael Jackson underneath the blue sky, throwing his jacket in right hand.

== Track listings ==
=== Vol.1 US Edition ===
1. "I Want You Back" (Z-Trip Remix) – The Jackson 5
2. "I Heard It Through the Grapevine" (The Randy Watson Experience Sympathy For The Grapes Mix) – Gladys Knight & the Pips
3. "Let's Get It On" (Da Producers MPG Groove Mix) – Marvin Gaye
4. "Signed, Sealed, Delivered I'm Yours" (DJ Smash Essential Funk Remix) – Stevie Wonder
5. "ABC" (Salaam Remi Krunk-A-Delic Party Mix) – The Jackson 5
6. "I Just Want to Celebrate" (Mocean Worker Remix) – Rare Earth
7. "Papa Was a Rollin' Stone" (DJ Jazzy Jeff & Pete Kuzma Solefull Mix) – The Temptations
8. "Quiet Storm" (Groove Boutique Remix) – Smokey Robinson
9. "My World Is Empty Without You" (Tranzition Remix) – The Supremes
10. "Just My Imagination (Running Away with Me)" (Easy Mo Bee Remix) – The Temptations
11. "Smiling Faces Sometimes" (Futureshock Entertainment Main Ingredient Mix) – Undisputed Truth
12. "The Tears of a Clown" (Hotsnax Remix) – Smokey Robinson & the Miracles
13. "Keep on Truckin'" (DJ Spinna Remix) – Eddie Kendricks
14. "War" (King Britt Mix) – Edwin Starr
15. "Mary Jane" (DJ Green Lantern Evil Genius mix) – Rick James

iTunes Bonus Tracks

16. "What Becomes of the Brokenhearted" (Mocean Worker Remix) – Jimmy Ruffin
17. "Reach Out I'll Be There" (Montez Payton & Taurus Braxton Remix) – Four Tops
18. "(Love Is Like A) Heat Wave" (Noizetrip Mix) – Martha & the Vandellas
19. "Ain't Nothing Like the Real Thing" (The Rurals Cool Mix) – Marvin Gaye and Tammi Terrell

=== Vol.1 UK Edition ===
1. "I Want You Back" (Z-Trip Remix) – The Jackson 5
2. "I Heard It Through the Grapevine" (The Randy Watson Experience Sympathy For The Grapes Mix) – Gladys Knight & the Pips
3. "Let's Get It On" (Da Producers MPG Groove Mix) – Marvin Gaye
4. "Keep on Truckin'" (DJ Spinna Remix) – Eddie Kendricks
5. "War" (King Britt Mix) – Edwin Starr
6. "Papa Was a Rollin' Stone" (DJ Jazzy Jeff & Pete Kuzma Solefull Mix) – The Temptations
7. "Stoned Love" (A Tom Moulton Mix) – The Supremes *
8. "Signed, Sealed, Delivered I'm Yours" (DJ Smash Essential Funk Remix) – Stevie Wonder
9. "I Just Want to Celebrate" (Mocean Worker Remix) – Rare Earth
10. "Smiling Faces Sometimes" (Futureshock Entertainment Main Ingredient Mix) – Undisputed Truth
11. "Neither One of Us (Wants to Be the First to Say Goodbye)" (Kenny Dope Mix) – Gladys Knight & the Pips *
12. "My World Is Empty Without You" (Tranzition Remix) – The Supremes
13. "Just My Imagination (Running Away with Me)" (Easy Mo Bee Remix) – The Temptations
14. "Quiet Storm" (Groove Boutique Remix) – Smokey Robinson

=== Vol.1 European Edition ===
1. "Ain't No Mountain High Enough" (Ben Human Mix) – Marvin Gaye and Tammi Terrell *
2. "I Want You Back" (Z-Trip Remix) – The Jackson 5
3. "Let's Get It On" (Da Producers MPG Groove Mix) – Marvin Gaye
4. "Quiet Storm" (Groove Boutique Remix) – Smokey Robinson
5. "Smiling Faces Sometimes" (Katalyst Mix) – Undisputed Truth *
6. "I Heard It Through the Grapevine" (The Randy Watson Experience Sympathy For The Grapes Mix) – Gladys Knight & the Pips
7. "Papa Was a Rollin' Stone" (DJ Jazzy Jeff & Pete Kuzma Solefull Mix) – The Temptations
8. "Keep on Truckin'" (DJ Spinna Remix) – Eddie Kendricks
9. "Neither One of Us (Wants to Be the First to Say Goodbye)" (Kenny Dope Mix) – Gladys Knight & the Pips
10. "The Tears of a Clown" (Soul Society Remix) – Smokey Robinson & the Miracles *
11. "My World Is Empty Without You" (Tranzition Remix) – The Supremes
12. "ABC" (DJ Friction Remix) – The Jackson 5 *
13. "I Just Want to Celebrate" (Mocean Worker Remix) – Rare Earth
14. "Signed, Sealed, Delivered I'm Yours" (DJ Smash Essential Funk Remix) – Stevie Wonder
15. "War" (Turntablerocker Remix) – Edwin Starr *

=== Vol.1 Australian Edition ===
1. "I Want You Back" (Suffa "Hilltop Hoods" Remix) – The Jackson 5 *
2. "I Heard It Through the Grapevine" (The Randy Watson Experience Sympathy For The Grapes Mix) – Gladys Knight & the Pips
3. "Papa Was a Rollin' Stone" (DJ Jazzy Jeff & Pete Kuzma Solefull Mix) – The Temptations
4. "Smiling Faces Sometimes" (Katalyst Mix) – Undisputed Truth
5. "Let's Get It On" (Da Producers MPG Groove Mix) – Marvin Gaye
6. "Signed, Sealed, Delivered I'm Yours" (DJ Smash Essential Funk Remix) – Stevie Wonder
7. "ABC" (Salaam Remi Krunk-A-Delic Party Mix) – The Jackson 5
8. "I Just Want to Celebrate" (Mocean Worker Remix) – Rare Earth
9. "My World Is Empty Without You" (Tranzition Remix) – The Supremes
10. "Just My Imagination (Running Away with Me)" (Easy Mo Bee Remix) – The Temptations
11. "Mary Jane" (DJ Green Lantern Evil Genius Mix) – Rick James
12. "Keep on Truckin'" (DJ Spinna Remix) – Eddie Kendricks
13. "The Tears of a Clown" (Hotsnax Remix) – Smokey Robinson & the Miracles
14. "War" (Danielsan Ichiban Remix) – Edwin Starr *

=== Vol.2 US Edition ===
1. "Shotgun" (Los Amigos Invisibles Mix) - Junior Walker & the All Stars
2. "(Love Is Like A) Heatwave" (David Elizondo Mix) - Martha Reeves & the Vandellas
3. "Papa Was A Rollin' Stone" (David Elizondo Mix) - The Temptations
4. "I Want You Back" (SPK Mix) - The Jackson 5
5. "The Boss" (Chosen Few Remix) - Diana Ross
6. "Dancing Machine" (Miami Mix) - The Jackson 5
7. "I Can't Get Next To You" (Randy Cantor Mix) - The Temptations
8. "I Heard It Through The Grapevine" (Fun Machine Mix) - Marvin Gaye
9. "Square Biz" (Sonidero Nacional Remix) - Teena Marie
10. "Don't Look Any Further" (DJ U.F. Low Mix) - Dennis Edwards and Siedah Garrett
11. "Aqui Con Tigo (Being With You)" (Eric Bodi Rivera Mix) - Smokey Robinson

iTunes Bonus Tracks

12 "I Heard It Through The Grapevine" (Bossa Mix By Mixmaster & Anthony Reale) - Marvin Gaye
13 "Jimmy Mack" (M+M Productions Fiesta Mix / Mixed by John Morales) - Martha Reeves & The Vandellas
14 "Jimmy Mack" (M+M Productions Spanglish Fiesta Mix Edit / Mixed by John Morales) - Martha Reeves & The Vandellas
15 "Being With You (Aqui Con Tigo)" (Eric Bodi Rivera Spanglish Mix) - Smokey Robinson

=== Vol.3 Japanese Edition ("Love Motown Remixed") ===
1. "ABC" (Plus-Tech Squeeze Box Remix) - The Jackson 5
2. "I Want You Back" (RE:NDZ Remix) - The Jackson 5
3. "Please Mr. Postman" (Yoshino Yoshikawa Remix) - The Marvelettes
4. "Baby Love" (Groovehacker$ Remix) - The Supremes
5. "I Can't Help Myself (Sugar Pie, Honey Bunch)" (Sexy-Synthesizer Remix) - Four Tops
6. "Dancing In The Street" (8#Prince Remix) - Martha & the Vandellas
7. "You Can't Hurry Love" (Tofubeats Remix) - The Supremes
8. "The Tears Of A Clown" (MYSS Remix) - Smokey Robinson & the Miracles
9. "War" (Okadada Re-Edit) - Edwin Starr
10. "It's A Shame" (Dorian Remix) - The Spinners
11. "Never Can Say Goodbye" (RE:NDZ Remix) - The Jackson 5
12. "(Love Is Like A) Heat Wave" (Sylcmyk Orangelove Remix) - Martha & the Vandellas

== Promotional singles ==
=== Motown Remixed Volume 1: Hip Hop ===
1. "I Want You Back" (Z-Trip Remix) – The Jackson 5
2. "I Heard It Through The Grapevine" (The Randy Watson Experience Sympathy For The Grapes Mix) – Gladys Knight and the Pips
3. "ABC" (Salaam Remi Extended Krunk-A-Delic Party Mix) – The Jackson 5
4. "Smiling Faces Sometimes" (Futureshock Entertainment Main Ingredient Mix) – Undisputed Truth
5. "I Want You Back" (Z-Trip Bonus Beats) – The Jackson 5

=== Motown Remixed Volume 2: Club ===
1. "Keep On Truckin'" (DJ Spinna Extended Mix) – Eddie Kendricks
2. "War" (King Britt Extended Mix) – Edwin Starr
3. "Signed, Sealed, Delivered I'm Yours" (DJ Smash Essential Funk Mix) – Stevie Wonder

=== Motown Remixed Volume 3: Chill ===
1. "Papa Was a Rollin' Stone" (DJ Jazzy Jeff & Pete Kuzma Solefull Mix) – The Temptations
2. "Let's Get It On" (Da Producers MPG Groove Mix) – Marvin Gaye
3. "Quiet Storm" (Groove Boutique Mix) – Smokey Robinson

=== Motown Remixed Online Exclusive ===
1. "ABC" (Salaam Remi Ska Mix) - The Jackson 5
2. "Mary Jane" (DJ Green Lantern Evil Genius Mix) - Rick James

=== Motown Remixed Extras - Real/Rhapsody ===
1. "Keep On Truckin'" (DJ Spinna Extended Mix) – Eddie Kendricks
2. "ABC" (Salaam Remi Extended Krunk-A-Delic Party Mix) - The Jackson 5

=== I Heard It Through The Grapevine / War ===
1. "I Heard It Through The Grapevine" (The Randy Watson Experience Sympathy For The Grapes Mix) – Gladys Knight and the Pips
2. "War" (King Britt Extended Mix) – Edwin Starr

=== German Promotional 12' ===
1. "War" (Turntablerocker Extended Remix) - Edwin Starr
2. "War" (Turntablerocker Dub Mix) - Edwin Starr
3. "Ain't No Mountain High Enough" (Ben Human Remix) - Marvin Gaye & Tami Terrell
4. "Signed, Sealed, Delivered I'm Yours" (DJ Smash Essential Funk Mix) - Stevie Wonder

== Charts ==
=== Vol. 1 ===
Chart (2005)	Peak position
US Billboard 200	86
US Compilation Albums (Billboard)	4
US Top R&B/Hip-Hop Albums (Billboard)	38

=== Vol. 2 ===
Chart (2007)	Peak position
US Compilation Albums (Billboard)	25
