= Face to Face with the Truth =

Face to Face With the Truth

Studio album by The Undisputed Truth
- Released: January 1972
- Recorded: 1971
- Genre: R&B, psychedelic soul
- Length: 42:11
- Label: Gordy; GS 959
- Producer: Norman Whitfield

The Undisputed Truth chronology
| The Undisputed Truth (1971) | Face to Face With the Truth (1972) | Law of the Land (1973) |

Singles from Face to Face With the Truth
- 1. "You Make Your Own Heaven and Hell Right Here on Earth" Released: December 1971; 2. "What It Is?" Released: February 1972

Professional ratings
Review scores
| Source | Rating |
|---|---|
| Allmusic | 4/5 stars |
| Christgau's Record Guide | B |

Face to Face With the Truth is the second album by the Motown group The Undisputed Truth, released in 1972.

Like their previous album, it was produced entirely by Norman Whitfield and most of the songs were also recorded by The Temptations, but with different arrangements. Two singles were released from the album, both minor hits on the Billboard charts: "You Make Your Own Heaven and Hell Right Here on Earth", and "What It Is?".

== Track listing ==
1. "You Make Your Own Heaven and Hell Right Here on Earth" (Barrett Strong, Norman Whitfield) 6:50
2. "What It Is?" (Barrett Strong, Norman Whitfield) 4:57
3. "Medley: Ungena Za Ulimwengu (Unite The World)/Friendship Train" (Barrett Strong, Norman Whitfield) 8:50
4. "Superstar (Remember How You Got Where You Are)" (Barrett Strong, Norman Whitfield) 2:56
5. "Take Me In Your Arms and Love Me" (Cornelius Grant, Roger Penzabene, Barrett Strong) 3:52
6. "Don't Let Him Take Your Love From Me" (Barrett Strong, Norman Whitfield) 5:25
7. "What's Going On" (Marvin Gaye, Al Cleveland, Renaldo Benson) 9:21

== Charts ==
| Chart (1972) | Peak position |
|---|---|
| Billboard Pop Albums | 114 |
| Billboard Top Soul Albums | 16 |

=== Singles ===
| Year | Single | Chart positions | |
| Year | Single | US | US R&B |
|---|---|---|---|
| 1972 | "You Make Your Own Heaven and Hell Right Here on Earth" | 72 | 24 |
| 1972 | "What It Is?" | 71 | 35 |
