= Taka Boom =

R&B and dance music singer (born 1954)

Taka Boom (born Yvonne Maude Stevens; October 8, 1954 in Chicago, Illinois) is an American R&B and dance music singer, and is the younger sister of singer Chaka Khan and Mark Stevens of Aurra. She sang background vocals for several Parliament albums in the 1970s. Taka Boom is sometimes credited as Takka Boom and is known for her work with DJ/producer Dave Lee, especially in a range of hits under the Joey Negro name. Boom was also a later member of the Norman Whitfield group The Undisputed Truth, and led them on their 1976 disco hit "You + Me = Love".

In 2002, Taka Boom collaborated with the British electronic music group amillionsons on a cover of the song "Misti Blu," providing vocals alongside her siblings Chaka Khan and Mark Stevens. In 2024, the collaboration with amillionsons was revisited with the release of "Misti Blu Two," featuring Taka Boom, Chaka Khan, and Mark Stevens.

== Discography ==
=== Albums ===
Year	Album	Label	Peak chart positions	
Year	Album	Label	US	US R&B
1979	Taka Boom	Ariola International	171	48
1983	Boomerang	Mercury	—	—
1985	Middle of the Night	Mirage/Atco	—	—
"—" denotes releases that did not chart.

=== Singles ===
Year	Single	Peak chart positions			
Year	Single	UK	US Hot 100	US Dance	US R&B
1976	"You + Me = Love" (with The Undisputed Truth)	43	48	5	37
1976	"Let's Go Down to the Disco" (with The Undisputed Truth)	—	—	40	68
1979	"Red Hot"	—	—	19	70
1979	"Night Dancin'"	—	74	—	20
1979	"Bring It Back"	—	—	55	—
1983	"To Hell with Him"	—	—	—	—
1983	"Ride Like the Wind"	—	—	—	—
1984	"The Stars Are Out"	—	—	—	—
1985	"Middle of the Night"	77	—	—	63
1985	"Climate for Love"	—	—	—	—
1997	"Clouds" (with The Source)	—	—	—	—
1998	"Can't Get High Without U" (with Joey Negro)	—	—	1	—
2000	"Must Be the Music" (with Joey Negro)	8	—	—	—
2000	"Saturday" (with Joey Negro)	41	—	—	—
2001	"Just Can't Get Enough (No No No)" (with Eye to Eye)	36	—	—	—
2001	"Surrender" (with Prospect Park)	—	—	—	—
2002	"Misti Blu" (with amillionsons)	39	—	—	—
2005	"Make a Move on Me" (with Joey Negro)	11	—	1	—
2006	"When Love Is Fading" (with Solsonik)	—	—	—	—
2008	"We Existed" (with Glimpse)	—	—	—	—
2024	"Misti Blu Two" (with amillionsons, Chaka Khan and Mark Stevens)	—	—	—	—
"—" denotes releases that did not chart.

== See also ==
- List of Billboard number-one dance club songs
- List of artists who reached number one on the U.S. Dance Club Songs chart
- List of UK top-ten singles in 2000
