= The Undisputed Truth (The Undisputed Truth album) =

Studio album by The Undisputed Truth
- Released: July 1971
- Recorded: 1971
- Genre: R&B, psychedelic soul
- Length: 44:02
- Label: Gordy
- Producer: Norman Whitfield

The Undisputed Truth chronology
The Undisputed Truth (1971)	Face to Face With the Truth (1972)

Singles from The Undisputed Truth
- 1. "Save My Love for a Rainy Day" Released: March 1971; 2. "Smiling Faces Sometimes" Released: June 1971

The Undisputed Truth is the self-titled debut album of the Motown group of the same name.

== Reception ==
Professional ratings
Review scores
Source	Rating
AllMusic	4/5 stars

Released in 1971, it was produced entirely by Norman Whitfield. The album includes the group's biggest hit single (and only US Top 40 hit), "Smiling Faces Sometimes", which peaked at No. 3 on the US Billboard Hot 100 Chart. Many of the songs on this album were also recorded by the group's Motown labelmates, the Temptations (also produced by Norman Whitfield). "Save My Love for a Rainy Day", for example, was originally recorded by the Temptations for their 1967 album The Temptations with a Lot o' Soul. The Undisputed Truth's version was released as their debut single, and it became a minor R&B hit, peaking at No. 43.

The album itself mixes the traditional Motown sound with psychedelic-influenced soul music. A prime example of this is "You Got the Love I Need", which actually uses a backing track recorded in 1965, the same backing track used for the Temptations' song "I Got Heaven Right Here On Earth", which is an unreleased outtake from their A Lot O' Soul album. "You Got the Love I Need" was released as the B-side to "The Undisputed Truth"'s hit single "Smiling Faces Sometimes". It is also the only original song on the album, as all its other tracks had already been recorded by other artists.

== Track listing ==
1. "You Got The Love I Need" (Barrett Strong, Norman Whitfield) 2:57
2. "Save My Love for a Rainy Day" (Norman Whitfield, Roger Penzabene) 3:50
3. "California Soul" (Nickolas Ashford, Valerie Simpson) 3:45
4. "Aquarius" (Galt MacDermot, Gerome Ragni, James Rado) 2:39
5. "Ball of Confusion (That's What the World is Today)" (Barrett Strong, Norman Whitfield) 10:20
6. "Smiling Faces Sometimes" (Barrett Strong, Norman Whitfield) 3:05
7. "We've Got a Way Out Love" (Holland-Dozier-Holland) 2:55
8. "Since I've Lost You" (Barrett Strong, Norman Whitfield) 3:10
9. "Ain't No Sun Since You've Been Gone" (Cornelius Grant, Norman Whitfield, Sylvia Moy) 2:42
10. "I Heard It Through the Grapevine" (Barrett Strong, Norman Whitfield) 2:51
11. "Like a Rolling Stone" (Bob Dylan) 6:30

== Charts ==
Chart (1971)	Peak position
Billboard Pop Albums	43
Billboard Top Soul Albums	7

=== Singles ===
Year	Single	Chart positions	
Year	Single	US	US R&B
1971	"Save My Love for a Rainy Day"	—	43
1971	"Smiling Faces Sometimes"	3	2
