= Game Theory (album) =

Studio album by the Roots
- Released: August 29, 2006
- Recorded: March – May 2006
- Studio: The Studio, The Boom Room, A House Called ?uest (Philadelphia); Encore Studios (Burbank, California); Conway Studios, Glenwood Studios (Los Angeles); Integrated Studios, Quad Studios, Platinum Studios, Electric Lady Studios (New York, New York)
- Genre: Alternative hip-hop; experimental hip-hop
- Length: 46:58
- Label: Def Jam
- Producer: The Roots; Adam Blackstone; Ahmir "Questlove" Thompson; Brook D'Leau; Darryl Robinson; J Dilla; John McGlinchey; Kamal Gray; Kevin Hanson; Khari Mateen; Omar Edwards; Owen Biddle; Pedro Martinez; Richard Nichols; Tahir Jamal; the Randy Watson Experience

The Roots chronology
| The Tipping Point (2004) | Game Theory (2006) | Rising Down (2008) |

Singles from Game Theory
- 1. "Don't Feel Right" Released: June 20, 2006; 2. "In The Music / Here I Come" Released: September 1, 2006

Game Theory is the seventh studio album by American hip-hop band the Roots, released August 29, 2006, on Def Jam Recordings. The group's first release for the label after leaving Geffen Records, the album was recorded by the Roots mostly using the Apple-developed software application GarageBand. A darker, grittier album with minimal emphasis on hooks in comparison to their previous work, Game Theory features a stripped-down sound similar to the work of Public Enemy, with lyrics that concern sociological themes and the late hip-hop producer J Dilla.

The album debuted at number nine on the U.S. Billboard 200 chart, selling 61,000 copies in its first week. It produced two singles and achieved moderate sales success. Upon its release, Game Theory received acclaim from most music critics and earned a Grammy Award nomination for Best Rap Album. To date, the album has sold over 200,000 copies in the United States.

== Music ==
In an interview for Rolling Stone magazine, Questlove expressed his view on contemporary black music and described the concept of Game Theory, comparing it to previous works:

In this day and age, I'm kind of noticing that nobody in urban music really has the balls to just stop partying for one second... I mean, partying is good and whatnot, and it's cool to get down, but I really think that 2006 called for a very serious record. This ain't the Debbie Downer record, or the political, save-the-world record, but this is definitely not the MC-based, battle-themed album that the Roots have been known for. This is our most serious record to date.

— Questlove

Described by Questlove as "very mature, serious, and very dark", the album, unlike the band's previous two efforts Phrenology (2002) and The Tipping Point (2004), combines the Roots's progressive tendencies and lush, jazz influenced hip-hop into a more homogenous and cohesive recording than past efforts had shown. In what could be a salute to a fellow experimental band, The Roots sample Radiohead's "You and Whose Army?" for the track "Atonement".

The subject material for Game Theory follows the more serious tone of the album, with topics ranging from the war in Iraq to violence in music. Questlove was quoted as saying "There was too much going on that we couldn't just sit back and not speak on it." In accordance with its more-serious tone, the album heavily references Public Enemy's highly-political It Takes a Nation of Millions to Hold Us Back on its lead track "False Media".

== Commercial performance ==
Game Theory debuted at number nine on the U.S. Billboard 200 chart with first week sales of 61,000 copies. It also debuted at number five on Billboard's Top R&B/Hip-Hop Albums and at number four on its Top Digital Albums chart. According to Nielsen SoundScan, the album has sold over 200,000 copies in the United States.

== Critical reception ==
Professional ratings
Aggregate scores
| Source | Rating |
|---|---|
| Metacritic | 83/100 |
Review scores
| Source | Rating |
| AllMusic | 4.5/5 stars |
| The A.V. Club | A− |
| Entertainment Weekly | A− |
| The Guardian | 4/5 stars |
| Los Angeles Times | 3/4 stars |
| Mojo | 4/5 stars |
| MSN Music (Expert Witness) | A− |
| Pitchfork | 7.7/10 |
| Rolling Stone | 3.5/5 stars |
| Spin | 4/5 stars |

Game Theory received universal acclaim from music critics. At Metacritic, which assigns a normalized rating out of 100 to reviews from mainstream critics, the album received an average score of 83, based on 26 reviews. AllMusic's Andy Kellman praised its musical quality and lyrical themes, writing "Spinning turbulence, paranoia, anger, and pain into some of the most exhilarating and startling music released in 2006,... Game Theory is a heavy album, the Roots' sharpest work. It's destined to become one of Def Jam's proudest, if not most popular, moments". The New York Times writer Nate Chinen viewed the album's production as inconsistent, but found Black Thought's performance more focused and engaged than on previous efforts, while writing that "?uestlove infuses 'Game Theory' with a hard sonic logic, so that the music often sounds as tough as the lyrics". Vibe's Thomas Golianopoulos gave it 4 out of 5 stars and called it "a masterfully crafted, sobering wake-up call". Jeff Vrabel of PopMatters dubbed it "The Roots' darkest, grimiest, most unrelenting and possibly most focused effort to date".

Los Angeles Times writer Oliver Wang commented that Game Theory "moves coherently as a whole and not just assemblage of spare songs". Rolling Stone's Peter Relic viewed the album as a progression over their previous work and wrote "For every head-nodding beat (and ?uestlove brings plenty of 'em), Game Theory has a head-turning treat". Will Dukes of The Village Voice called it The Roots' "most radical record to date" and commended Black Thought for his lyricism on the album, writing "Raw, emotive, and urgent as a motherfucker, his flow—on songs like opener 'False Media,' whose gangly steel snares give way to plush orchestration—is bleak and expansive and seething with wrath". Robert Christgau, writing for MSN Music, felt that the album is "not hooky enough", but "strong enough to compensate" with a tone that "maintains until the J. Dilla encomium that closes."

In its end-of-year list, Rolling Stone named it the eighteenth best album of 2006, calling it "classic studio Roots". It was named one of the top ten albums of the year by URB. The album was nominated for a Grammy Award for Best Rap Album, ultimately losing to rapper Ludacris's Release Therapy (2006) at the 49th Grammy Awards.

In 2013, for Complex, the singer Bilal named it among his 25 favorite albums, explaining that, "It just has a real nice flow. That whole album just sounds very thought out and put together. I think Game Theory was kind of a game changer. It just seemed like everything was fluid."

== Track listing ==
Track numbers continued from The Tipping Point. Unless otherwise noted, Credits are adapted from the album's Liner Notes

| No. | Title | Writer(s) | Producer(s) | Length |
|---|---|---|---|---|
| 114. | "Dillatastic Vol Won(derful)" | | J Dilla | 0:28 |
| 115. | "False Media" (featuring Wadud Ahmad) (Chorus: Wadud Ahmad) | Tariq Trotter; Ahmir “Questlove” Thompson; Karl B. Jenkins; James Poyser; James “Kamal” Gray | Kamal Gray (of The Roots); The Randy Watson Experience | 2:43 |
| 116. | "Game Theory" (featuring Malik B.) | T. Trotter; A. Thompson; J. Gray; Khari Mateen; Kirk Douglass; Leonard Hubbard; Malik Abdul-Basit | The Roots; Khari Mateen | 4:01 |
| 117. | "Don't Feel Right" (featuring Maimouna Youssef) (Chorus: Maimouna Youssef) | T. Trotter; A. Thompson; K. B. Jenkins; J. Gray; Tahir Jamal | The Roots; Tahir Jamal | 4:08 |
| 118. | "In the Music" (featuring Malik B. and PORN) (Chorus: PORN) | T. Trotter; A. Thompson; K. B. Jenkins; J. Gray; K. Douglass; L. Hubbard; M. Abdul-Basit; Richard Nichols; Kevin Hanson; Pedro Martinez; Owen Biddle | Owen Biddle (of The Roots); Richard Nichols; Pedro Martinez; Kevin Hanson | 4:06 |
| 119. | "Take It There" (featuring Wadud Ahmad) (Chorus: Black Thought & Dice Raw) | T. Trotter; A. Thompson; J. Gray; K. Douglass; L. Hubbard; K. Hanson; P. Martinez; Darrell Robinson; Frank “Knuckles” Walker; Adam Blackstone | Ahmir “Questlove” Thompson (of The Roots); Adam Blackstone; Richard Nichols; Pedro Martinez; Kevin Hanson | 2:50 |
| 120. | "Baby" (featuring John-John) (Chorus: John-John) | T. Trotter; A. Thompson; J. Gray; K. Douglass; L. Hubbard; F. Walker; John McGlinchey | The Roots; John McGlinchey | 2:50 |
| 121. | "Here I Come" (featuring Dice Raw & Malik B.) (Chorus: Black Thought & Dice Raw) | T. Trotter; A. Thompson; K. B. Jenkins; J. Gray; K. Douglass; L. Hubbard; M. Abdul-Basit; R. Nichols; F. Walker | Owen Biddle (of The Roots); Richard Nichols; Pedro Martinez; Brook D'Leau | 4:11 |
| 122. | "Long Time" (featuring Peedi Peedi & Bunny Sigler) (Chorus: Bunny Sigler & Dice Raw) | T. Trotter; A. Thompson; K. B. Jenkins; J. Gray; K. Douglass; L. Hubbard; Pedro Zayas; Bunny Sigler | Owen Biddle (of The Roots); Kevin Hanson; Darryl Robinson; Richard Nichols; Omar Edwards | 4:21 |
| 123. | "Livin' in a New World" (featuring John-John) (Chorus: John-John) | T. Trotter; K. B. Jenkins; K. Mateen | The Roots; Khari Mateen | 1:47 |
| 124. | "Clock with No Hands" (featuring Mercedes Martinez) (Chorus: Mercedes Martinez) | T. Trotter; A. Thompson; K. B. Jenkins; J. Gray; K. Mateen; L. Hubbard | The Roots; Khari Mateen; Brook D'Leau | 4:23 |
| 125. | "Atonement" (featuring Jack Davey) (Chorus: Jack Davey) | T. Trotter; A. Thompson; K. B. Jenkins; J. Poyser | The Roots; The Randy Watson Experience | 2:35 |
| 126. | "Can't Stop This" | T. Trotter; A. Thompson; K. B. Jenkins; J. Poyser; James Yancey | J Dilla; The Roots; The Randy Watson Experience | 8:35 |

UK, Japan, iTunes bonus track
| No. | Title | Length |
|---|---|---|
| 127. | "Bread & Butter" (featuring Truck North) | 3:40 |

=== Sample credits ===
- The intro track "Dillatastic Vol Won(derful)" used a sample of Slum Village's first album, Fantastic Vol.1's intro track, "Fantastic", which J Dilla produced. ("Fantastic" incorporates elements of the Herbie Hancock composition "You'll Know When You Get There", from VSOP.)
- The track "False Media" contains interpolations of Public Enemy's "Don't Believe The Hype", written by Carlton Ridenhour, Eric Sadler & Hank Shocklee.
- The track "Game Theory" contains a sample of Sly and the Family Stone's "Life of Fortune and Fame", written by Sylvester Stewart.
- The track "Don't Feel Right" samples Kool & The Gang's "Jungle Boogie", and The Ohio Players's "Ecstasy", written by Walter "Junie" Morrison, Leroy "Sugarfoot" Bonner, Marshall "Rock" Jones, Andrew Noland, Gregory Allen Webster, Marvin "Merv" Pierce, Norman Napier & Ralph "Pee Wee" Middlebrooks.
- The track "Long Time" contains an interpolation of "Trolling for Olives" written by Owen Biddle, Kevin Hanson & Darryl Robinson.
- The track "Atonement" samples Radiohead's "You and Whose Army?"
- The track "Can't Stop This" contains a sample of The Jackson 5's "All I Do Is Think of You", written by Brian Holland & Michael Lovesmith, and The Moments' "To You with Love". This song's backing track is an extended version of J Dilla's "Time: The Donut of the Heart" from his third solo album Donuts.

== Personnel ==
- Wadud Ahmad – additional vocals (2), spoken word voices (6)
- Black Thought – lead rap vocals (2–13)
- Jack Davey – additional vocals (12)
- Davis Barnett – viola
- Dice Raw – lead rap vocals (6–9), background vocals (6–7)
- Robert "LB" Dorsey – recording engineer (2, 4–5, 7–9, 13)
- Captain Kirk Douglas – guitar
- Russell Elevado – recording engineer (2, 5–6, 8–9), audio mixing (2, 7, 9, 13), pre-mixing (drums on 5)
- Larry Gold – string arrangements, string conductor, cello
- Jason Goldstein – audio mixing (3–4, 6, 8, 10–13)
- Kamal Gray – keyboards
- Kevin Hanson – producer
- Michael Heinzer – background vocals (7)
- Leonard "Hub" Hubbard – bass
- J Dilla – recording engineer (13)
- John-John – additional lead vocals (7, 10), background vocals (7)
- Gloria Justen – violin
- Dave Klutch – mastering
- Emma Kummrow – violin
- Jennie Lorenzo – cello
- Malik B. – lead rap vocals (3, 5, 8)
- Steve Mandel – recording engineer (1–2, 4, 7, 12–13), audio mixing (1)
- Mercedes Martinez – background vocals (6, 10–11)
- Khari Mateen – recording engineer (3, 10–11)
- John McGlinchey – recording engineer (7)
- Charles Parker – violin
- Peedi Peedi – additional rap vocals (9)
- PORN – additional vocals (5)
- Rahzel – human beatbox (6)
- The Roots – main performer
- Bunny Sigler – vocals sung by (9)
- Jon Smeltz – recording engineer (2–6, 8–13), audio mixing (5)
- Igor Szwec – violin
- Ahmir "?uestlove" Thompson – recording engineer, audio mixing (1), background vocals (7), drums
- Frank "Knuckles" Walker – percussion
- Maimouna Youssef – vocals sung by (4)

== Charts ==
Chart performance
| Chart (2006) | Peak position |
|---|---|
| Australian Hitseekers Albums (ARIA) | 8 |
| Canadian Albums (Nielsen SoundScan) | 27 |
| Dutch Albums (Album Top 100) | 78 |
| Dutch Alternative Albums (Alternative Top 30) | 8 |
| Finnish Albums (Suomen virallinen lista) | 36 |
| French Albums (SNEP) | 69 |
| German Albums (Offizielle Top 100) | 95 |
| Norwegian Albums (VG-lista) | 26 |
| Swedish Hip Hop Albums (Sverigetopplistan) | 2 |
| Swiss Albums (Schweizer Hitparade) | 7 |
| UK Albums (OCC) | 76 |
| UK R&B Albums (OCC) | 9 |
| US Billboard 200 | 9 |
| US Indie Store Album Sales (Billboard) | 2 |
| US Top R&B/Hip-Hop Albums (Billboard) | 5 |
| US Top Rap Albums (Billboard) | 4 |
