= Christmas Remixed =

Christmas remix compilation album

Compilation album by various artists
- Released: October 21, 2003
- Genre: Christmas music; electronic
- Length: 47:31
- Label: Six Degrees
- Producer: Doug Bernheim; Jeff Daniel; Billy Straus; David Hargis

Professional ratings
Review scores
| Source | Rating |
|---|---|
| AllMusic | 3.5/5 stars |

Christmas Remixed is a Christmas compilation and remix album, containing remixes of popular classic versions of Christmas songs.

== Release ==
The album was released in 2003 by Six Degrees Records on October 21, 2003. A follow-up album, Christmas Remixed 2, was released in 2005. A third album, Christmas Remixed 3, was released in 2018 to celebrate the 15th anniversary of the series.

== Critical reception ==
The album elicited a positive critical reaction upon its release. AllMusic's Rick Anderson awarded the album 3.5 stars, commenting that "there will probably not be a better new Christmas album this year than this one," going on to call the album "a complete blast" and stating that "this album is very highly recommended."

== Commercial performance ==
The album debuted at number 21 on the Billboard's "Top Dance/Electronic Albums" chart dated December 6, 2003. The following week, it rose six spots to number 16. The next week, it rose another seven spots to enter the top ten, before peaking at number 5 on the chart dated December 27, 2003. The album spent a total of six weeks on the chart.

== Track listing ==
1. Andy Williams - "It's the Most Wonderful Time of the Year" (A Shrift Remix) - 3:46
2. Bing Crosby - "Happy Holiday" (Beef Wellington Remix) - 4:10
3. Dean Martin - "Jingle Bells" (Dan the Automator Remix) - 3:19
4. Kay Starr - "I've Got My Love To Keep Me Warm" (Stuhr Remix) - 2:49
5. The Cathedral Brass - "Joy to the World" (Mocean Worker Remix) - 3:24
6. Johnny Mercer - "Winter Wonderland" (Rise Ashen's Brazilian Beach Mix) - 4:06
7. Charles Brown - "Merry Christmas Baby" (MNO Remix) - 3:44
8. Berlin Symphony Orchestra - "Nutcracker Suite" (Baz Kuts Breaks Mix) - 4:59
9. Louis Armstrong & Velma Middleton - "Baby, It's Cold Outside" (Mulato Beat Remix) - 4:18
10. Duke Ellington - "Jingle Bells" (Robbie Hardkiss Remix) - 4:12
11. Bing Crosby - "The First Noel" (Attaboy House Party Mix) - 3:52
12. Mel Tormé - "The Christmas Song" (Michael Kessler Open Fire Mix) - 5:15

== Credits and personnel ==
Adapted from AllMusic and album liner notes.

Remixing

- Attaboy
- Dan the Automator
- Robbie Hardkiss
- Michael Kessler
- Mocean Worker
- MNO
- Rise Ashen
- Stuhr

Production

- Doug Bernheim
- Jeff Daniel
- Billy Straus
- David Hargis

A&R

- Robert Duskis

== Charts ==
| Chart (2003) | Peak position |
|---|---|
| US Top Dance/Electronic Albums | 5 |
