= Enter the Mowo! =

Studio album by Mocean Worker
- Released: June 4, 2004
- Genre: Electroswing
- Length: 49:25
- Language: English
- Label: HYENA
- Producer: Martin Brumbach; Mocean Worker

Mocean Worker chronology
Aural & Hearty (2000)	Enter the Mowo! (2004)	Cinco de Mowo! (2007)

Enter the Mowo! is a 2004 album by Mocean Worker. The album received positive reviews and includes new recordings and samples of several jazz musicians with electronic backing. Mocean Worker went on tour to support the effort in 2005.

== Reception ==
Jason MacNeil of PopMatters gave the album a positive review, calling the mixture of artists and styles a "great success", while criticizing a few ideas on the release as incomplete. In Exclaim!, Joshua Ostroff wrote that Mocean Worker lived up to his personal legacy of jazz performance via his father and top billing alongside jazz greats sampled on this album. Brian Ferdman of Jambands.com wrote that the album has a "beautiful arc", with mixes of several genres of music, summing up: "Every disparate source, solo, and sample fits so well that it’s nearly impossible to tell which instrumentalists are live, dead, or mere by-products of Dorn’s vivid imagination. Finely crafted albums like Enter the MoWo! have become a rarity in today’s world, but Adam Dorn’s impressive effort has resulted in a superb creation than transcends the limitations of an album. Enter the Mowo! is a true work of art and a damn fine one at that." The editorial staff of AllMusic Guide gave the album four out of five stars, with reviewer Joshua Glazer positively positioning the release in jazz history, with its varied references to bop and previous attempts to sample dead musicians on new compositions. All About Jazz called it his finest work with deft musicianship. A mixed review from Michael Allen Goldberg of the Miami New Times critiqued the recordings for being unoriginal. John Murph gave a mildly negative review in Jazz Times, calling the music kitschy and musty but praising specific tracks and performances.

== Track listing ==
1. "Chick a Boom Boom Boom" – 3:55
2. "Only the Shadow Knows" – 2:30
3. "Right Now" – 4:11
4. "Shamma Lamma Ding Dong" – 5:12
5. "I'll Take the Woods" – 5:42
6. "Salted Fatback" – 4:02
7. "Move" – 4:52
8. "That's What's Happenin' Tonight" – 3:32
9. "On and On" – 3:46
10. "Blackbird" – 3:12
11. "Float" – 5:15
12. "Collection II" – 3:16

== Personnel ==
- Mocean Worker – vocals, composition, production

Additional musicians

- Bill Frisell on "Salted Fatback"
- Rahsaan Roland Kirk on "Shamma Lamma Ding Dong"
- Franck Gauthier on "Shamma Lamma Ding Dong"
- Les McCann on "That's What's Happenin' Tonight"
- Jane Monheit on "Float"
- David "Fathead" Newman on "Chick a Boom Boom Boom
- Ambrosia Parsley on "I'll Take the Woods"
- Nina Simone on "Blackbird"

Additional personnel

- Martin Brumbach – production
