= Mocean Worker =

American musician

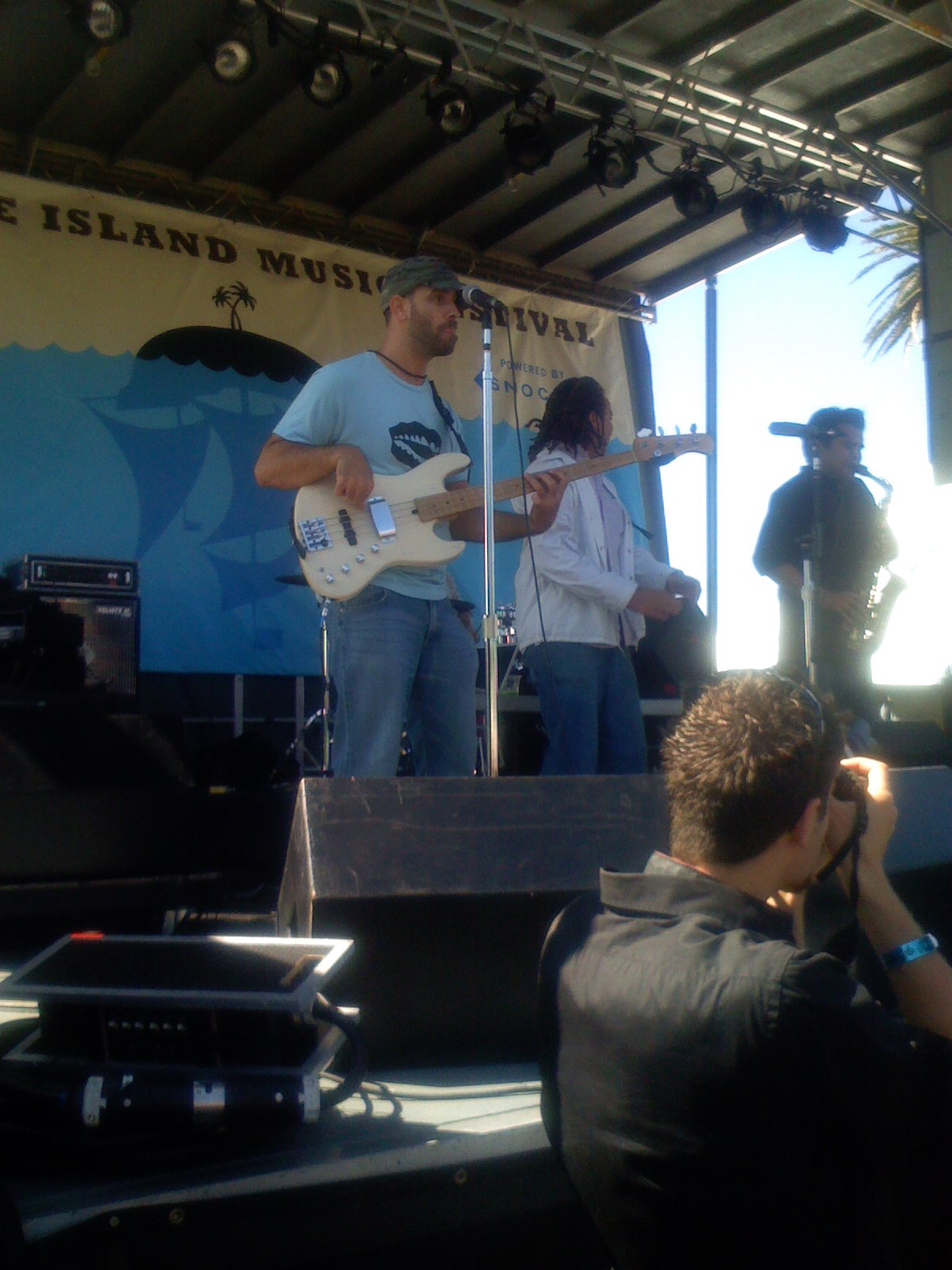

Background information
- Born: Adam Dorn
- Genres: Jazz, Drum 'n' Bass, electroswing
- Occupations: Musician, songwriter
- Instruments: Bass guitar, Vocals

Mocean Worker (pronounced "motion worker") is the recording alias of jazz musician and producer Adam Dorn.

Philadelphia native Dorn, son of jazz and R'n'B producer Joel Dorn, studied at Berklee College of Music. He adopted the Mocean Worker moniker as a DJ of drum and bass music, and his style evolved to include electro-swing, funk, big-band, and swing elements. Dorn has led bands, given high-profile performances, and had his music used extensively in TV, advertising, and film. In 2014, Dorn and Charlie Hunter launched the podcast Compared To What and released an album titled It's Pronounced Motion... in Japan.

== Biography ==
Philadelphia native Adam Dorn is the son of renowned jazz and R'n'B producer Joel Dorn. He grew up around the jazz and R&B discs his father produced for Atlantic Records in the '60s and '70s. As a 15-year-old, he sent a fan letter to bassist Marcus Miller. When Miller responded, inviting Dorn to come by the studio, one visit turned into three years hanging around artists David Sanborn, Luther Vandross and Miles Davis. Dorn is a bass player and vocalist. He studied at Berklee College of Music in Boston, Massachusetts.

Dorn adopted the Mocean Worker moniker as a DJ of drum and bass music. The project came about almost by accident, the results of a series of half-serious recording sessions. Since the release of his first album, Home Movies from the Brainforest, the style has varied from a drum and bass sound to a jazz-oriented dance sound that some call electro-swing, incorporating elements of funk, big-band and swing.

Dorn currently resides in Los Angeles after living in New York City for the better part of twenty-five years.

In 2008, Dorn led an eight-piece band, which featured some of New York City's most revered soul and funk players. Assembled by Dorn to bring to life the "breakbeat jazz" stylings of the Mocean Worker studio albums, the group gave a series of high-profile performances, including Bumbershoot, Burlington Discover Jazz Festival and a residency at N.Y.C. venue Nublu.

Dorn's music has been used extensively in TV, advertising and film, including "Tres Tres Chic" in The Devil Wears Prada and The Pink Panther, "Chick a Boom Boom Boom" in Inside Deep Throat, "Reykjavak" in The Namesake, and "Right Now" in Client 9: The Rise and Fall of Elliot Spitzer. He also scored the Showtime/BBC film documentary about the life of comedian/actor Richard Pryor entitled Richard Pryor: Omit the Logic. Additionally, his song "Intothinair" from the album Aural and Hearty was featured in the film The Bourne Supremacy.

In early 2014 Dorn and partner Charlie Hunter launched the podcast Compared To What featuring conversations with a wide variety of people. There has also been a sudden interest in the Japanese market for Mocean Worker's sound. In February 2014 Dorn released an album featuring some new and unreleased material entitled It's Pronounced Motion... in Japan through the Voil label.

== Discography ==
=== Albums ===
- Home Movies from the Brainforest (released April 7, 1998)
- Mixed Emotional Features (released February 23, 1999)
- Aural & Hearty (released September 26, 2000)
- Enter the Mowo! (released April 6, 2004)
- Cinco de Mowo! (released June 26, 2007)
- Candygram for Mowo! (released September 27, 2011)
- It's Pronounced Motion... (released April 7, 2014) – Hits compilation featuring three new tracks ("Piano Boogie," "Easy Does It Baby," "The Sky Is Black") and one that would appear on his next album ("Now That's What I'm Talkin' Bout")
- Mocean Worker (released digitally August 18, 2015, scheduled for physical release February 5, 2016)
- The Lost Frame (released November 8, 2018)
- Boombox (released October 27, 2023)

=== Singles and EPs ===
- Detonator (1998) (features a remix by DJ Trace); one of the CD versions also includes the song "Counts, Dukes & Strays" from Mixed Emotional Features and two versions of the title track
- Diagnosis / Boba Fett (1998)
- Times of Danger / Heaven @ 12:07 (1999) (features a remix of "Heaven @ 12:07" by Technical Itch); the CD version also includes the song "René M" from Mixed Emotional Features
- Intothinair (2000) (features remixes by Joshua Ryan and John Selway)
- Shake Ya Boogie – The Remix EP (2009 – Digital release) features remixes by Ursula 1000, Count de Money, and Bill Hamel
- Shooby Shooby Do Yah! – The Remixes! (2012 – Digital release) features remixes by Questionable Sound Corp, Neanderthals With Technology, Techdef, and Choppertone
- Beats, Rhymes and Strife (2012 – Digital release)

=== Remixes ===
- Tenacious D – "Explosivo" (Mocean Worker's Megamix) on the EP D Fun Pak (2002)
- Cathedral Brass – "Joy to the World" on the albums Christmas Remixed - Holiday Classics Re-Grooved (2003) and Holiday Remixed (2005)
- Charles Wright & the Watts 103rd Street Rhythm Band – "Express Yourself" on What Is Hip?: Remix Project, Vol. 1 (2004), Express Yourself - EP (2005), and Mr. and Mrs. Smith Soundtrack (2005)
- Rare Earth – "I Just Want to Celebrate" on the album Motown Remixed (2005)
- Nina Simone – "Go to Hell" on the album Nina Simone Remixed and Reimagined (2006)
- Herb Alpert – "Bittersweet Samba" on the album Whipped Cream and Other Delights Rewhipped (2006)
- Marvin Gaye – "Here, My Dear" on the album Here, My Dear Expanded Edition (2008)
- Alice Russell – "All Alone" on the album Pot of Gold (Remixes) Volume 1 (2008)
- Johnny Cash – "Hey Porter" on the album Johnny Cash Remixed (2009)
- Keely Smith – "What Is This Thing Called Love?" on the album Electro Lounge, Vol. 2 (2010)
- Lyrics Born – "Coulda Woulda Shoulda" on the album As 'U Were (Remixes) (2012)
- Ramin Sakurai – "Brace Yourselves (feat. Elan Atias)" (2012) (credited to Mocean Worker with Supreme Beings of Leisure)
- "Harry Goes A Courtin' (The Mowo! Live Hootenanny Throw-Down)" on The Harry Smith Project Anthology of American Folk Music Revisited (2014)
- Soft Touch – "Swim in the Night (feat. Silya)" on Swim in the Night feat. Silya (remixes) (2014)
- Scott Amendola – "Fade to Orange - Mocean Worker Remix" on the album Fade to Orange (2015)

=== Compilations ===
- Groove Jammy, Vol. 2 (1999) – "Lighten Up Francis"
- Sound and Motion, Vol 1 (2000) – "Detonator"
- Pink Panther's Penthouse Party (2004) – "Tres Tres Chic"
- Starbucks: Hear Music Playlist Volume 3 (2004) – "Right Now"
- WFUV: City Folk Live VII (2004) – "Right Now"
- Jazz Lounge, Vol. 2 (2004) – "Right Now"
- Ultra Chilled 05 (2005) – "Right Now"
- Oliver Peoples 4 (2005) – "Shamma Lamma Ding Dong"
- Inside Deep Throat Soundtrack (2005) – "Chick a Boom Boom Boom"
- The Devil Wears Prada Soundtrack (2006, Warner Bros./Wea) – "Tres Tres Chic"
- Jazz&Milk Breaks (2008) – "Shamma Lamma Ding Dong"
- Sundown: Music for Unwinding (2008) – "Changes"
- Electro Swing Club, Vol. 1 (2013) – "Shooby Shooby Do Yah!"
- I Love Swing Music (2013) – "Shooby Shooby Do Yah!"

=== Appearances ===
- Bird Up: The Charlie Parker Remix Project features two tracks "produced and constructed" by "Hal Willner's Whoops I'm an Indian," credited to Hal Willner, Mocean Worker, and Martin Brumbach. (The songs are "Salt Peanuts (The Mr. Peanut Chronicles)" and "All The Shadows Of Nuff")
- The 2009 John Foti album Everybody's Coming to Town includes the track "I'm Just a Boy (feat. Mocean Worker)"
- Although it is not on the movie's soundtrack CD, the song "Intothinair" is featured in the film The Bourne Supremacy during the Moscow club scene.
- In 2005 Mocean Worker supported Marcus Miller in his tour of Japan. In preparation, Mocean Worker paid an inordinate amount of money for designer trousers.
- The song "Hey Baby" is featured in the films The Animal, Max Keeble's Big Move and is used in a level in Shark Tale (video game)
- The song "Right Now" is featured in an advertisement for the 2007 Lincoln Navigator, and in "The Shower", an episode of Fox TV's The O.C..
- The song "Tickle It" is featured in an episode of the television show CSI and is also used as theme music for the "All Tech Considered" segments on the NPR show All Things Considered.
- The song "Tickle it" is featured in the award-winning independent film Skills Like This.
- The song "Swagger" was featured in the Dec. 19, 2011 episode of the American Public Media show Marketplace.
