= You + Me = Love =

Single by The Undisputed Truth

from the album Method to the Madness
- Released: August 1976
- Recorded: 1976
- Genre: Disco, funk, soul
- Length: 3:30
- Label: Whitfield; WHI 8231; Warner Bros. K 16804
- Songwriter: Norman Whitfield
- Producer: Norman Whitfield

The Undisputed Truth singles chronology
"Higher Than High" (1975)	"You + Me = Love" (1976)	"Let's Go Down to the Disco" (1976)

"You + Me = Love" is a 1976 disco song recorded by The Undisputed Truth for Norman Whitfield's Whitfield Records.

== Background ==
Norman Whitfield, producer and creator of The Undisputed Truth, had been at Motown Records for over a decade, and, in 1975, left to start up his own record label, Whitfield Records. The Undisputed Truth were the first act to follow him from Motown to Whitfield, after a line-up change. Tyrone "Big Ty" Douglas and the then-female lead singer Virginia "V" McDonald left. Taka Boom, Chaka Khan's sister, joined longtime member Joe Harris and 1974 additions Calvin "Dhaak" Stevenson and Tyrone "Lil Ty" Barkley. This group recorded The Truth's debut album for Whitfield Records, Method to the Madness, and are who appear on its cover.

== Details ==
"You + Me = Love", featuring Taka Boom on lead, was released as The Undisputed Truth's first Whitfield single. It was the group's second biggest success on the Pop Charts, behind only 1971's "Smiling Faces Sometimes". The song reached #48 on the Billboard Hot 100 and #37 on the R&B Charts. The track peaked at #5 on the National Disco Action, Top 40 chart.

Outside the US, the song was the group's one-and-only UK hit, peaking at #43 on the UK Singles Chart in early 1977.
