= Amillionsons =

English electronic music group

amillionsons
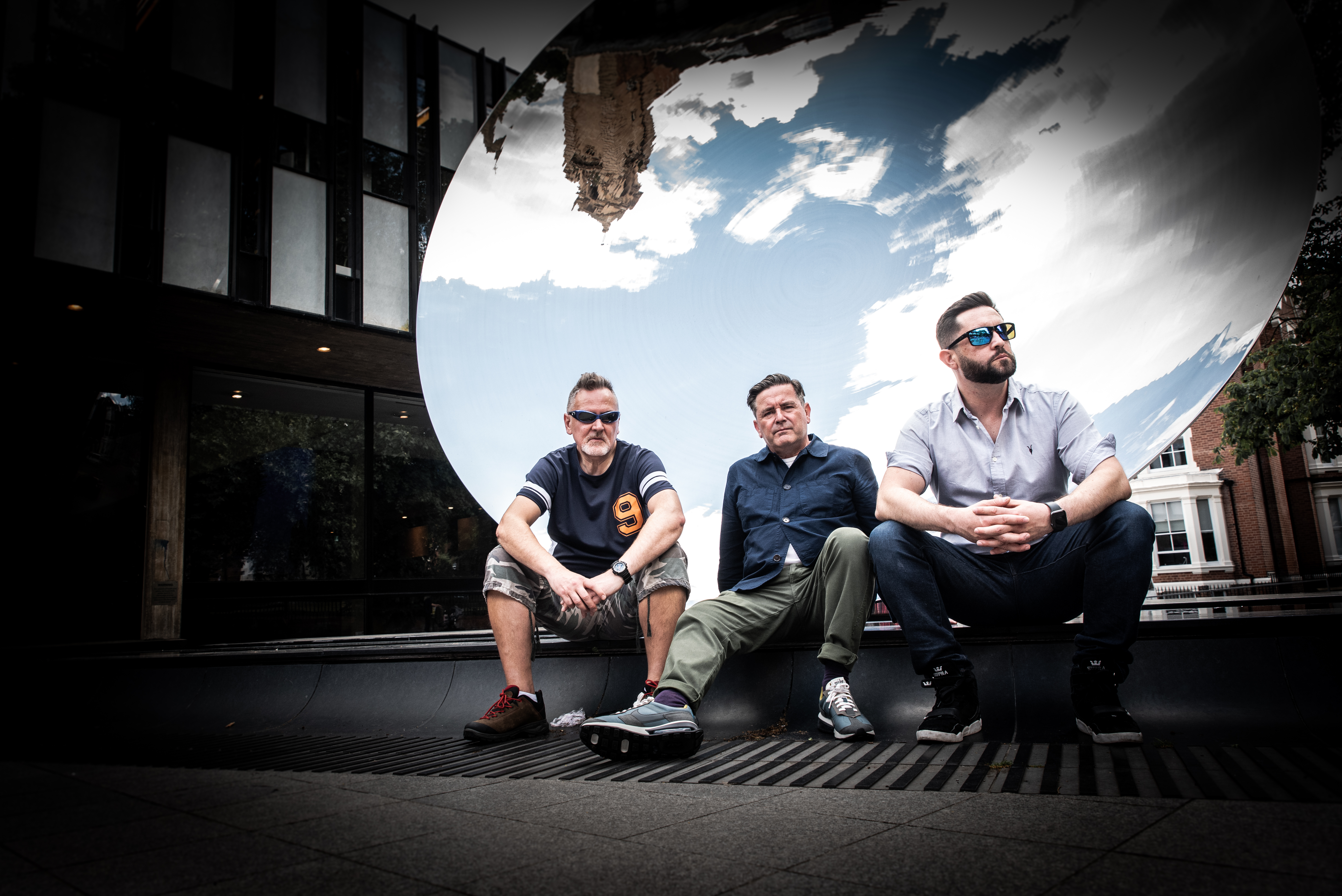

Background information
- Also known as: 21st Century Planet Smashers
- Origin: Nottingham, England
- Genres: Downtempo; Balearic; electronic
- Years active: early 2000s–c. 2012; 2023–present
- Labels: FFRR; London Records; Renaissance Recordings; Shiva
- Members: Andy Kulesza; Karl Robin Junga; Matt Shelton

amillionsons are an electronic music trio from Nottingham, United Kingdom. The band members are Andy Kulesza, Karl Robin Junga and Matt Shelton.

In 2002 their single "Misti Blu" reached number 39 on the Official UK Singles Chart and number 4 on the Official Dance Singles Chart.

== History ==
=== Formation and "Misti Blu" ===
amillionsons formed in Nottingham in the early 2000s. LeftLion magazine reported he name came from a lyric in the Beatles' song "Across the Universe", and that the members had previously been in other bands and DJed on the local club scene.

BBC Radio 1 DJs Steve Lamacq and Mary Anne Hobbs were original supporters of amillionsons playing their early records, which led to Pete Tong signing a bootleg of "Misti Blu' to record label FFRR. "Misti Blu" was then later released on record label London Records.

Pete Tong played "Misti Blu" the Magik Johnson Vocal Mix on his Radio 1 show on 28 June 2002. The original "Misti Blu" was also played by Mary Anne Hobbs on her Radio 1's Experimental Show on 9 July 2002. In August 2002, amillionsons appeared at BBC Radio 1's Ibiza Weekend alongside Pete Tong, Dirty Vegas, Darren Emerson and more, at Punta es Moli.

"Misti Blu" is amillionsons version of "Misty Blue". The original was written by late composer Bob Montgomery which was then recorded by Dorothy Moore in 1977 which was nominated for Grammy award in 19th Annual Grammy Awards.

In 2002, London Records released a 12-inch vinyl (LONX468) of amillionsons's version of "Misti Blu", which featured vocals by Taka Boom, Chaka Khan and Mark Stevens.

On 24 August 2002, the single entered the UK Official Singles Chart and reached number 39 and number 4 on the UK Official Dance Singles Chart. It spent a further two weeks in the UK Official Charts top 75.

In July 2002 the BBC announced that amillionsons were scheduled to be in the Top of the Pops studio to pre-record a performance for the show.

The music video for "Misti Blu" was directed by Oscar winner, Mat Kirkby, and was nominated for the Electronic Music Video of the Year at the 2003 Music Video Production Association Awards.

amillionsons remixed Weekend Players' "I'll Be There", called the "Sonnyside Up Mix", which was released on a 2002 FFRR promotional 12-inch record and later on Multiply Records. The "I'll Be There" single reached number 1 on Billboard's Hot Dance Club Play chart on 17 May 2003.

=== "Underground Night Music" ===
In 2004 amillionsons, under the pseudonym 21st Century Planet Smashers released "Underground Night Music" on record label Renaissance Recordings. The record features Eddy Temple-Morris. A dub version was featured on disc two of Hernán Cattáneo's mix album Renaissance: The Masters Series which was released in February 2004.

A review by Resident Advisor music reviewer Robbie Y wrote that "the guitar riffs and beats of 'Underground Night Music'" kept "the pace progressing nicely in true electro rock style".

A remastered digital edition was released on Hottwerk Records on 1 November 2024.

=== The First One's Free ===
Amillionsons’ debut album The First One's Free, was released in 2005 on Shiva Records. It includes tracks "Misti Blu", "Summer Song" and "Stay Off the Dope".

Jack Smith, a music reviewer for BBC Music, wrote that the music "exudes a rare blend of originality, sultriness and carefree innocence". He likened "Need You Tonight" to the Art of Noise and said that the song "Stay Off the Dope" features cut-ups samples of The Simpsons theme tune.

amillionsons went on hiatus around 2012.

=== Return ===
BBC Radio DJ, Steve Lamacq played a white label of "Misti Blue 22" on his BBC Radio 6 Music programme on 21 October 2022.

In September 2023, amillionsons released a digital remastered edition of The First One's Free, marking the groups return to the music scene.

In 2024 the group released "Misti Blu Two", a brand new recording of the band's earlier "Misti Blu", and reunited with the original vocalists Taka Boom on lead vocals, with Chaka Khan and Mark Stevens providing backing vocals.

== Musical style ==
amillionsons are described as a mix of Balearic, downtempo and electronic styles. Jack Smith's BBC review said the debut album The First One’s Free fell between lounge, jazz and chilled breaks, and used obscure samples in some of their tracks.

== Discography ==
=== Studio albums ===
| Title | Album details |
|---|---|
| The First One's Free | Released: 2005; Reissued: 22 September 2023; Label: Shiva; AmillionRecords (reissue) |

=== Singles ===
| Year | Title | Peak UK | Peak UK Dance | Album |
|---|---|---|---|---|
| 2002 | "Misti Blu" | 39 | 4 | The First One's Free |
| 2004 | "Underground Night Music" (as 21st Century Planet Smashers featuring Eddy Temple-Morris) | — | — | non-album single |
| 2024 | "Misti Blu Two" (featuring Taka Boom, Chaka Khan and Mark Stevens) | — | — | non-album single |

Chart positions from the Official Charts Company.
