= Seventh Star (band) =

American Christian hardcore/metal band

- Origin: Ocala, Florida
- Genres: Christian hardcore, Christian metal, hardcore punk, metalcore
- Years active: 1998–2008, 2015-present
- Label: Facedown
- Members: Shawn Douglas; Mike Whitaker; Johnny Intravaia; Drew Russ; Chase Moore
- Past members: Jai Leacock; Brian Fahey; Brian Curtis

Seventh Star is an American Christian hardcore and Christian metal band, and they primarily play hardcore punk and metalcore. They come from Ocala, Florida. The band started making music, in 1998, founded by Mike Whitaker, Jai Leacock and Shawn Douglas and disbanded, in 2008, while their members were Shawn Douglas, Johnny Intravaia, Drew Russ, and Chase Moore, (Mike Whitaker rejoined for final hometown show and final European tour). They released four albums, the first being "Lifeblood" which was mainly DIY, followed by three with Facedown Records, Dead End in 2003, Brood of Vipers in 2005, and The Undisputed Truth in 2007. The band, as of 2015, reunited for some concerts, one with the support of Gideon, Bishop, and Culture Killer. The band also played Facedown Fest in 2016.

== Background ==
Seventh Star was a Christian hardcore and Christian metal band from Ocala, Florida. Their final membership was vocalist, Johnny Intravaia, guitarist, Mike Whitaker, bassist, Drew Russ, and drummer, Shawn Douglas, with their past members being vocalist, Jai Leacock, guitarist, Brian Fahey, and guitarist, Brian Curtis.

== Music history ==
The band commenced as a musical entity in 1998, releasing an EP entitled "Lifeblood" and then signing to Facedown Records with their first release Dead End, a studio album, released by Facedown Records, on June 3, 2003. Their subsequent album, Brood of Vipers, was released on May 10, 2005, from Facedown Records. The third studio album, The Undisputed Truth, was released by Facedown Records, on June 12, 2007.

== Members ==
Last known line-up

- Johnny Intravaia – lead vocals (2004-2008, 2015–present)
- Chase Moore – lead/rhythm guitar (2004-2008, 2015–present)
- Mike Whitaker - lead/rhythm guitar, vocals (1998-2008, 2015–present)
- Drew Russ – bass (2002-2008, 2015–present)
- Shawn Douglas – drums (1998-2008, 2015–present)

Other members

- Jai Leacock – lead vocals (1998-2004)
- Brian Curtis – lead guitar (1998-2004)
- Brian Fahey - lead guitar (2005-2007)

Timeline

== Discography ==
EPs

- Lifeblood (2001, Warfare)

Studio albums

- Dead End (June 3, 2003, Facedown)
- Brood of Vipers (May 10, 2005, Facedown)
- The Undisputed Truth (June 12, 2007, Facedown)
