= Ball of Confusion (That's What the World Is Today) =

1970 song by The Temptations

Single by the Temptations

from the album Greatest Hits II
- B-side: "It's Summer"
- Released: May 7, 1970
- Recorded: April 12 and 14, 1970
- Studio: Hitsville U.S.A. (Studio A), Detroit
- Genre: Psychedelic soul, funk
- Length: 4:06
- Label: Gordy – G 7099
- Songwriters: Norman Whitfield; Barrett Strong
- Producer: Norman Whitfield

The Temptations singles chronology
"Psychedelic Shack" (1969)	"Ball of Confusion (That's What the World Is Today)" (1970)	"Ungena Za Ulimwengu (Unite the World)" (1970)

UK single cover

"Ball of Confusion"

Single by B.E.F. featuring Tina Turner

from the album Music of Quality and Distinction Volume One
- B-side: "Ball of Confusion" (instrumental)
- Released: 1982
- Recorded: 1982
- Genre: Synth-pop; dance-pop
- Length: 3:50
- Label: Virgin
- Songwriters: Norman Whitfield; Barrett Strong
- Producers: Martyn Ware; Ian Craig Marsh

Tina Turner singles chronology
"Music Keeps Me Dancin'" (1979)	"Ball of Confusion" (1982)	"Let's Stay Together" (1983)

"Ball of Confusion (That's What the World Is Today)" is a 1970 hit single by the Temptations. It was released on the Gordy (Motown) label, and written by Norman Whitfield and Barrett Strong. The lyrics list problems affecting the world, including crime, taxes and drugs, calling them a "ball of confusion." It was part of the group's "psychedelic soul" phase.

The song was used to anchor the Temptations' 1970 Greatest Hits II LP. It reached number 3 on the US pop charts and number 2 on the US R&B charts. Billboard ranked the record as the number 24 song of 1970. It reached number 7 on the UK Singles Chart.

Although a nearly eleven minute long backing track was recorded by the Funk Brothers, only slightly more than four minutes was used for the Temptations' version of the song. The full backing track can be heard on the 1971 self titled debut album of the Motown group the Undisputed Truth.

Cash Box said of the song that the Temptations came up with "another shocker featuring studio-work voltage and the charge of new-Temps lyric power" and "another electrifying experience".

== Personnel ==
- Lead vocals by Dennis Edwards, Eddie Kendricks, Paul Williams, and Melvin Franklin
- Background vocals by Dennis Edwards, Eddie Kendricks, Paul Williams, Melvin Franklin, and Otis Williams
- Written by Norman Whitfield and Barrett Strong
- Produced by Norman Whitfield
- Instrumentation by the Funk Brothers

== In popular culture ==
Randy Shilts quoted the lyrics from "Ball of Confusion" when he named his award-winning journalistic account of the AIDS epidemic, And the Band Played On. In the song, the repeated usage of the phrase "and the band played on" signaled that no one was paying proper attention to world problems, in the same manner the AIDS epidemic was initially ignored.

The Undisputed Truth's 1971 cover of the song was featured in the trailers for the 2022 film Nope.

The song plays in the opening combat scene of Tropic Thunder.

It is sung by the nuns in Sister Act 2: Back in the Habit.

"Ball of Confusion (That's What the World Is Today)" is featured in the Watchmen episode Martial Feats of Comanche Horsemanship.

== Tina Turner version ==
The song "Ball of Confusion" plays an important part in the career of Tina Turner—if only indirectly. Her recording of the track was included on the 1982 album Music of Quality and Distinction Volume One, a tribute by the British Electric Foundation featuring members of the new wave band Heaven 17, Love and Rockets and a number of guest vocalists covering 1960s and 1970s hits, among them Sandie Shaw, Paul Jones, Billy Mackenzie, Paula Yates, and Gary Glitter.

Turner's synth-driven interpretation of "Ball of Confusion" opened the album, was also issued as a single, and became a top five hit in Norway; this led to Capitol Records signing Turner and to Martyn Ware and Ian Craig Marsh recording another 1970s cover with her in late 1983. The track was Al Green's "Let's Stay Together", which became a surprise hit single on both sides of the Atlantic and the starting point of Turner's comeback, with the following 1984 album Private Dancer going multi-platinum in 1984.

=== Track listing and formats ===
- European 7" single
1. "Ball of Confusion (That's What the World Is Today)" – 3:50
2. "Ball of Confusion (That's What the World Is Today)" (instrumental) – 3:50

=== Charts ===
Chart performance for "Ball of Confusion" by B.E.F.
Chart (1982)	Peak position
Norway (VG-lista)	5

== See also ==
- List of anti-war songs
