= The Randy Watson Experience =

Music group

The Randy Watson Experience is a supergroup which includes hip-hop/R&B musicians Questlove and James Poyser.

== Career ==
The group is named after an incidental character in the 1988 film Coming to America.

They have played on multiple NTS Radio shows, including Flaneur Radio.

== Discography ==
- 2005: Motown Remixed - "I Heard It Through the Grapevine"
- 2006: Exit Music: Songs with Radio Heads - "Morning Bell"
