= The Undisputed Truth (Seventh Star album) =

2007 studio album by Seventh Star

Studio album by Seventh Star
- Released: June 12, 2007
- Genre: Christian hardcore, Christian metal, hardcore punk, metalcore, crossover thrash
- Length: 31:25
- Label: Facedown

Seventh Star chronology
Brood of Vipers (2005)	The Undisputed Truth (2007)

The Undisputed Truth is the third and final studio album by Seventh Star. It was released by Facedown Records on June 12, 2007.

== Critical reception ==
Professional ratings
Review scores
Source	Rating
AllMusic	3/5 stars
Cross Rhythms	7/10 squares
Indie Vision Music	7/10

Awarding the album three stars for AllMusic, Stewart Mason wrote, "[T]here's little here that will attract listeners who aren't already Christian-leaning metalcore fans." Peter John Willoughby, giving the album a seven out of ten at Cross Rhythms, wrote, "It's hardcore for the masses done by genuine guys we'll miss." Rating the album a seven out of ten from Indie Vision Music, Rand wrote that "they have cut a great album".

== Track listing ==
All tracks are written by Seventh Star except track #9 co-written with Justin Chaillou.

No.	Title	Length
1.	"The Undisputed Truth"	3:47
2.	"Now at Hand"	2:56
3.	"World War Three"	2:38
4.	"Cursed Creation (The Fall of Man)"	2:43
5.	"Isaiah Six"	3:02
6.	"For All the Saints"	2:48
7.	"Seven"	3:12
8.	"The World's Solution"	2:25
9.	"I Versus I"	3:07
10.	"Overrun, Overgrown, Overthrown"	2:34
11.	"Chasing the Wind"	3:05
Total length:		31:25
