= Papa Was a Rollin' Stone =

1972 single by the Undisputed Truth

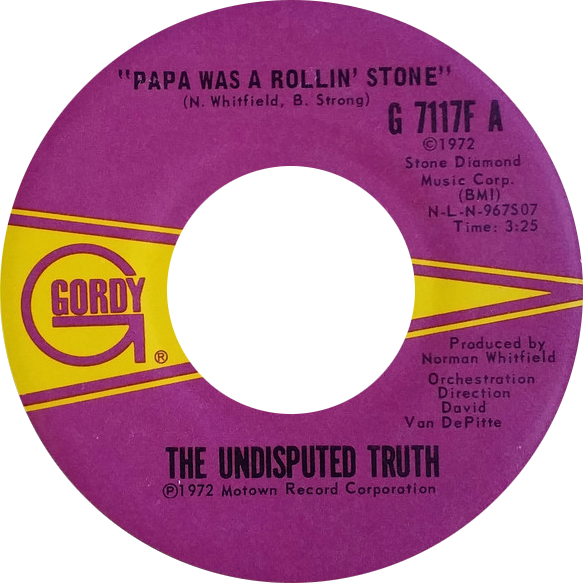
- US single of the Undisputed Truth recording

Single by the Undisputed Truth

from the album Law of the Land
- B-side: "Friendship Train"
- Released: May 9, 1972
- Genre: Soul
- Length: 3:25
- Label: Gordy
- Songwriters: Norman Whitfield; Barrett Strong
- Producer: Norman Whitfield

The Undisputed Truth singles chronology
"Superstar (Remember How You Got Where You Are)" (1972)	"Papa Was a Rollin' Stone" (1972)	"Girl, You're Alright" (1973)

"Papa Was a Rollin' Stone"
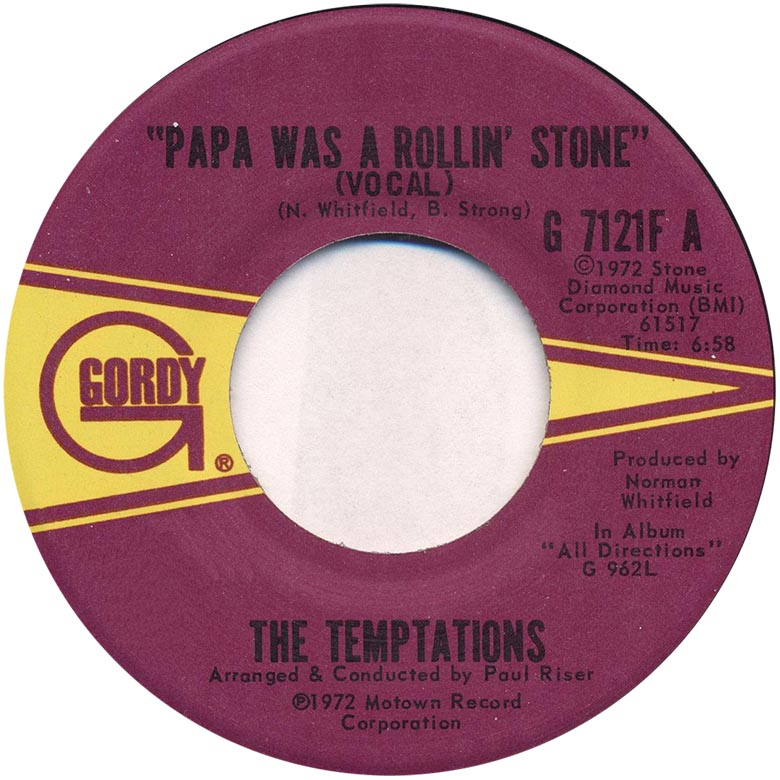
- US single of the Temptations recording

Single by the Temptations

from the album All Directions
- B-side: "Papa Was a Rollin' Stone" (instrumental)
- Released: September 28, 1972
- Recorded: May 15, June 14, June 22 and 28, 1972
- Studio: Hitsville USA (Studio A), Detroit, Michigan
- Genre: Psychedelic soul; funk
- Length: 6:54 (single edit); 12:04 (album mix); 11:45 ("faded early")
- Label: Gordy (G 7121)
- Songwriters: Norman Whitfield; Barrett Strong
- Producer: Norman Whitfield

The Temptations singles chronology
"Mother Nature" (1972)	"Papa Was a Rollin' Stone" (1972)	"Masterpiece" (1973)

Official audio
- "Papa Was a Rollin' Stone" (11:45 version) on YouTube

"Papa Was a Rollin' Stone (Remix 1987)"

Single by the Temptations
- Released: 1987
- Genre: Soul
- Label: Motown
- Songwriters: Norman Whitfield; Barrett Strong

"Papa Was a Rollin' Stone" is a song originally performed by Motown recording act the Undisputed Truth in 1972, though it became much better known after a Grammy Award–winning cover by the Temptations was issued later the same year. This latter version of the song became a number-one hit on the Billboard Hot 100.

"Papa Was a Rollin' Stone" was written by Norman Whitfield and Barrett Strong in 1971. Whitfield produced the original Undisputed Truth version, which was released as a single in May 1972. This version of the song peaked at number 63 on the Pop Charts and number 24 on the R&B Charts. The song was included on the Undisputed Truth's album Law of the Land (1973).

Later in 1972, Whitfield cut a different version of the song, turning it into a 12-minute track for the Temptations. This version was included on their 1972 album All Directions. The edited 7-inch single release of this Temptations track was issued in September 1972, and this version was a number-one hit on the Billboard Hot 100 and won three Grammy Awards in 1973. While the original Undisputed Truth version of the song has been largely forgotten, the Temptations' version of the song has been regarded as an enduring and influential soul classic. The full-length album version was ranked number 169 on Rolling Stone's list of the 500 Greatest Songs of All Time, one of the group's three songs on the list. In retrospect, the Temptations' Otis Williams considers the song to be the last real classic the group recorded (it would be the Temptations' last number one hit and would win them their second and final Grammy Award in a competitive category).

== Temptations version ==
Friction arose during the recording of "Papa Was a Rollin' Stone" for a number of reasons. The Temptations did not like the fact that Whitfield's instrumentation had been getting more emphasis than their vocals on their songs at the time, and that they had to press Whitfield to get him to produce ballads for the group. Whitfield forced Dennis Edwards to re-record his parts dozens of times until he finally got the angered, bitter grumble he desired out of the usually fiery-toned Edwards. Whitfield's treatment of the group eventually led to his dismissal as their producer. Legend has it that Edwards was angered by the song's first verse: "It was the third of September / That day I'll always remember / 'cause that was the day / that my daddy died", as his father was said to have died on the third of September. Edwards's father actually died on the third of October.

The solo trumpet part in the introduction was played by Funk Brothers member Maurice Davis; guitar parts were played by fellow member Melvin "Wah-Wah Watson" Ragin and a young Paul Warren.

== Release ==
A seven-minute edited version of "Papa Was a Rollin' Stone" was released as a single in September 1972. The B-side was the instrumental backing by the Funk Brothers without the Temptations' vocals.

== Reception ==
"Papa Was a Rollin' Stone" rose to number one on the U.S. pop charts and number five on the U.S. R&B charts, becoming the Temptations' final pop number-one hit. The song, the anchor of the 1972 Temptations album All Directions, won three 1973 Grammy Awards: its A-side won for Best R&B Vocal Performance by a Group; its B-side won for Best R&B Instrumental (awarded to Whitfield and arranger/conductor Paul Riser); and Whitfield and Barrett Strong won for Best R&B Song as the song's composers. In 1999, the song was inducted into the Grammy Hall of Fame.

Music critic Kelefa Sanneh described the song as "nearly seven glorious minutes long (the album version was twelve) sustained by little more than a perfect bassline and a few artfully placed hand claps."

Stereogum called it "a monolith. A towering monument out of tense hi-hats and pulsating bass and shivering strings and hard-strutting chicken-scratch guitars and panicked trumpet-blasts. And the merciless four-four stomp-clap beat predicted not just disco but house music, as well."

== Covers and remixes ==
- Bill "Wolf" Wolfer created an electronic cover of the song for his 1983 debut album Wolf. The single peaked at number 55 on the Billboard Hot 100 in January 1983, as well as number 47 on the R&B singles chart. Michael Jackson provided backing vocals.
- The group Was (Not Was) covered the song on their 1990 album Are You Okay?. Their version reached number 12 in the UK.
- George Michael performed "Papa Was a Rollin' Stone" live at the Wembley Arena in March 1991 and released it in a remixed version together with the Adamski song "Killer" on the 1993 EP Five Live. It was released as a single and charted at number 69 on the US Billboard Hot 100.
- On May 17, 2024, the British-American musician Slash released a cover of the song as part of his second solo studio album Orgy of the Damned (2024); the track featured American singer Demi Lovato.

== Personnel ==
=== Undisputed Truth version ===
- Lead and background vocals by Joe Harris, Billie Rae Calvin, and Brenda Joyce

=== Temptations version ===
- Lead vocals by Dennis Edwards, Melvin Franklin, Richard Street, and Damon Harris
- Background vocals by Dennis Edwards, Melvin Franklin, Richard Street, Damon Harris, and Otis Williams
- Arranged and conducted by Paul Riser
- Instrumentation by the Funk Brothers (specific musicians listed below) and the Detroit Symphony Orchestra
  - Guitars by Melvin "Wah Wah Watson" Ragin and Paul Warren
  - Fender Rhodes electric piano by Earl Van Dyke
  - Organ by Johnny Griffith
  - Trumpet by Maurice Davis
  - Bass by Bob Babbitt, Leroy Taylor, or James Jamerson
  - Drums by Aaron Smith

== Charts ==
=== The Temptations version ===
Weekly chart performance for "Papa Was a Rollin' Stone" by the Temptations
Chart (1972–1973)	Peak position
Australia (Kent Music Report)	69
Belgium (Ultratop 50 Flanders)	16
Canada Top Singles (RPM)	12
France (SNEP)	42
Germany (GfK)	11
Netherlands (Dutch Top 40)	5
Netherlands (Single Top 100)	3
New Zealand (Listener)	6
South African Chart	6
Spain (AFE)	7
UK Singles (Official Charts)	14
US Billboard Hot 100	1
US Best Selling Soul Singles (Billboard)	5

=== Remix version ===
1987 weekly chart performance for "Papa Was a Rollin' Stone" (remix) by the Temptations
Chart (1987)	Peak position
Italy Airplay (Music & Media)	18
UK (Official Charts Company)	31

2010 weekly chart performance for "Papa Was a Rollin' Stone" (remix) by the Temptations
Chart (2010)	Peak position
Belgium (Ultratop 50 Back Catalogue Singles Wallonia)	19

=== Was (Not Was) version ===
Weekly chart performance for "Papa Was a Rolling Stone" by Was (Not Was)
Chart (1990)	Peak position
Australia (ARIA)	75
Austria (Ö3 Austria Top 40)	15
Belgium (Ultratop 50 Flanders)	40
Canada RPM Top Singles	57
Irish Singles Chart	11
Netherlands (Dutch Top 40)	13
Netherlands (Single Top 100)	14
New Zealand (Recorded Music NZ)	22
Switzerland (Schweizer Hitparade)	6
UK (Official Charts Company)	12
US Billboard Hot Dance Club Play	10
US Billboard Hot Dance Music/Maxi-Singles Sales	43
US Billboard Hot R&B/Hip-Hop Singles	60

== Certifications ==
Certifications for "Papa Was a Rollin' Stone" by the Temptations
Region	Certification	Certified units/sales
United Kingdom (BPI)	Silver	200,000^{‡}
United States (RIAA)	Platinum	1,000,000^{^}
^{^} Shipments figures based on certification alone.^{‡} Sales+streaming figures based on certification alone.

== See also ==
- A rolling stone gathers no moss
