= Law of the Land (song) =

- French release picture sleeve

Single by The Temptations

from the album Masterpiece
- B-side: "Funky Music Sho Nuff Turns Me On"
- Released: 1973
- Recorded: 1973
- Genre: Psychedelic soul, funk, disco
- Length: 5:08
- Label: Tamla Motown (UK); TMG 866
- Songwriter(s): Norman Whitfield
- Producer(s): Norman Whitfield

The Temptations singles chronology
"Hey, Girl (I Like Your Style)" (1973)	"Law of the Land" (1973)	"Let Your Hair Down" (1973)

"Law of the Land"

Single by The Undisputed Truth

from the album Law of the Land
- B-side: "Just My Imagination (Running Away With Me)"
- Released: 1973
- Recorded: 1973
- Genre: Psychedelic Soul, Funk, Disco
- Length: 3:37
- Label: Gordy (Motown); G 7130F; Tamla Motown (UK); TMG 943
- Songwriter(s): Norman Whitfield
- Producer(s): Norman Whitfield

The Undisputed Truth singles chronology
"Mama, I Got a Brand New Thing (Don't Say No)" (1973)	"Law of the Land" (1973)	"Help Yourself" (1974)

"Law of the Land" is a soul song written by Norman Whitfield for the Motown label. A socially conscious funk track with elements of early disco music, it details the rules of human society that people have to accept and live by.

== Details ==
The song was recorded by both of Whitfield's groups, The Temptations and The Undisputed Truth, in 1973 (January and April, respectively), and both versions were given single release. The Temptations' version was released as a UK-only single by Tamla Motown, and just missed out on the UK Top 40, reaching number 41. That version was included on volume eight of the Motown Chartbusters compilation album series. The Undisputed Truth released their version of song that same year, and it became a minor hit in America, making number 40 on the R&B Charts.

== Personnel ==
=== The Temptations version ===
- Lead vocals by Dennis Edwards, Richard Street, Damon Harris
- Background vocals by Dennis Edwards, Richard Street, Damon Harris, Melvin Franklin and Otis Williams

=== The Undisputed Truth version ===
- Lead and background vocals by Joe Harris, Billie Rae Calvin and Brenda Joyce Evans

== Covers ==
The Undisputed Truth, having been disbanded for the entirety of the 1980s, reformed with Brainstorm vocalist Belita Woods to record a new version of the song for Motown lover Ian Levine and his Motorcity Records label. The rerecorded song (with some new lyrics added) was released as an 8-minute-long 12-inch single in 1991.
