= Johnny Griffith (musician) =

Background information
- Born: John Ellis Griffith Jr. July 10, 1936; Detroit, Michigan, U.S.
- Died: November 10, 2002 (aged 66) Detroit, Michigan, U.S.
- Occupation: Musician
- Instrument: Keyboards
- Years active: 1950s–1970s
- Formerly of: The Funk Brothers

John Ellis Griffith Jr. (July 10, 1936 – November 10, 2002) was an American musician.

== Biography ==
Born in Detroit, Griffith was a musician who played keyboards for Motown Records' in-house studio band, The Funk Brothers. Among Griffith's most notable performances on the hundreds of Motown recordings he played on are the electric piano on "I Heard It Through the Grapevine" by Marvin Gaye and "Ain't Too Proud to Beg" and by The Temptations, and the organ on "Stop! In the Name of Love" by The Supremes and "Shotgun" by Junior Walker & the All Stars. Griffith also played on many of the non-Motown releases with the Funk Brothers, such as "Cool Jerk" by The Capitols and "(Your Love Keeps Lifting Me) Higher and Higher" by Jackie Wilson.

Griffith played the Steinway grand piano, the Hammond B-3 organ, the Wurlitzer electric piano, the Fender Rhodes, and the celeste and harpsichord. His musical influences included Bud Powell, Glenn Gould, and Oscar Peterson.

Griffith died of a heart attack in a Detroit hospital on November 10, 2002. He was 66 years old.
