= Smiling Faces Sometimes =

Single by the Undisputed Truth

from the album The Undisputed Truth
- B-side: "You Got the Love I Need"
- Released: May 13, 1971
- Recorded: 1971
- Studio: Hitsville U.S.A. (Studio A); Detroit, Michigan
- Genre: Psychedelic soul; pop-funk
- Length: 3:16
- Label: Gordy G 7108
- Songwriters: Norman Whitfield; Barrett Strong
- Producer: Norman Whitfield

The Undisputed Truth singles chronology
"Save My Love For A Rainy Day" (1971)	"Smiling Faces Sometimes" (1971)	"You Make Your Own Heaven And Hell Right Here On Earth" (1971)

"Smiling Faces Sometimes" is a soul song written by Norman Whitfield and Barrett Strong for the Gordy label. It was originally recorded by the Temptations in 1971. Producer Norman Whitfield had the song re-recorded by the Undisputed Truth the same year, resulting in a number-three Billboard Hot 100 position for the group. "Smiling Faces" was the only Top 40 single released by the Undisputed Truth, and was included on their debut album The Undisputed Truth.

== Overview ==
Both versions of "Smiling Faces Sometimes" deal with the same subject matter, "back-stabbing" friends who do their friends wrong behind their backs ("Smiling faces sometimes...they don't tell the truth...smiling faces tell lies"), but in different ways. The lyrics inform the Listener to not be fooled by the smile, the handshake, or the pat on the back. The Temptations' original uses an arrangement similar to a haunted house film score to represent feelings of fear and timidness. Included on the 1971 Sky's the Limit album, "Smiling Faces Sometimes" runs over 12 minutes, most of which is extended instrumental passages without any vocals. This version established the epic, cinematic approach to the group's productions that Whitfield would perfect on subsequent hits like "Papa Was a Rollin' Stone" (1972) and "Masterpiece" (1973). An edited version was planned as the Temptations' summer 1971 single release, but this plan was dropped when lead vocalist Eddie Kendricks, frustrated by personnel problems within the group, quit the Temptations and signed a solo deal with Motown in March 1971.

Whitfield was known for recording dramatically different versions of the same song with different Motown artists, including Smokey Robinson & the Miracles' "I Heard It Through the Grapevine" (re-recorded as hit records for Gladys Knight & the Pips, and Marvin Gaye) and the Temptations' "War" (re-recorded as a hit for Edwin Starr). After Kendricks left The Temptations, an undaunted Whitfield re-recorded the song with his latest protégés, psychedelic trio the Undisputed Truth. Their version is noted for the line: "Can You Dig It". Billboard ranked the resulting single as the number 14 song for 1971.

The O'Jays' similarly themed 1972 hit "Back Stabbers" quotes the lyrics "smiling faces, smiling faces sometimes...(tell lies)" in the refrain near the end of the song.

Whitfield later revisited the song for the 1973 album Ma, recorded by Motown's white rock band, Rare Earth, which he produced and wrote.

== Critical reception ==
Daryl Easlea of the BBC found the tune's "dense production and finger-pointing lyrics chimed perfectly with the suspicion and paranoia of the age.

Andrew Hamilton of Allmusic claimed, "Smiling Faces Sometimes" has a dead serious beat and some strong comments about people who show their teeth all the time."

== Chart history ==
=== Weekly charts ===
Chart (1971)	Peak position
Canada RPM Top Singles	6
U.S. Billboard Hot 100	3
U.S. Billboard R&B/Soul	2
U.S. Easy Listening (Billboard)	34
U.S. Cash Box Top 100	1

=== Year-end charts ===
Chart (1971)	Rank
U.S. Billboard Hot 100	14
U.S. Cash Box	19
U.S. R&B/Soul (Billboard)	17

== Personnel ==
- Written by Norman Whitfield and Barrett Strong
- Produced by Norman Whitfield
- Instrumentation by the Funk Brothers

=== Temptations version ===
- Lead vocals by Eddie Kendricks and Dennis Edwards
- Background vocals by Dennis Edwards, Melvin Franklin, Paul Williams, Eddie Kendricks, and Otis Williams

=== Undisputed Truth version ===
- Lead and background vocals by Joe Harris, Billie Rae Calvin, and Brenda Joyce

=== Rare Earth version ===
- Released on their 1973 album Ma, also produced by Norman Whitfield, with lead vocals by Peter Hoorelbeke. Contains Spanish lyrics at the beginning that are ignored in all transcriptions of the lyrics.
