= Barrett Strong =

American singer and songwriter (1941–2023)

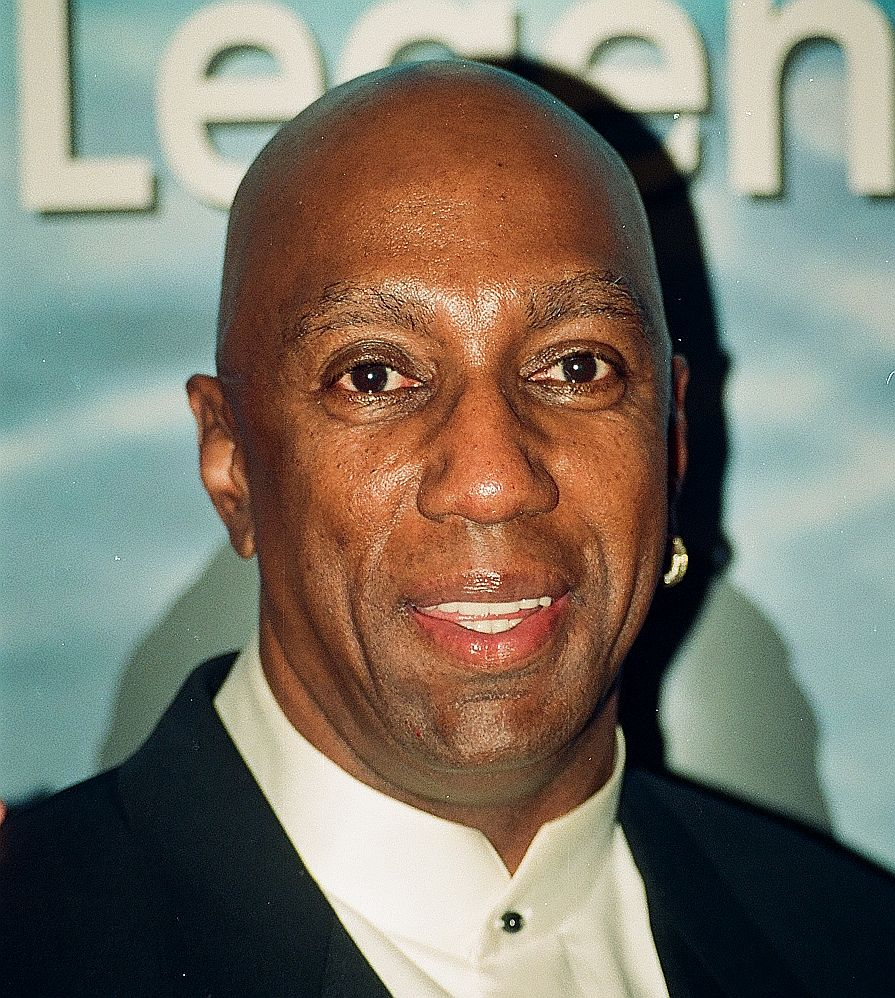
- Strong in 1996

Background information
- Born: Barrett Strong Jr. February 5, 1941; West Point, Mississippi, U.S.
- Origin: Detroit, Michigan, U.S.
- Died: January 28, 2023 (aged 81) San Diego, California, U.S.
- Genres: Rhythm and blues; soul
- Occupations: Singer; songwriter
- Years active: 1959–2023
- Labels: Tamla; Anna; Epic; Capitol; Tollie
- Spouse: Sandy White (died 2002)

Barrett Strong Jr. (February 5, 1941 – January 28, 2023) was an American singer and songwriter known for his recording of "Money (That's What I Want)", which was the first hit single for the Motown record label. He is also known for his songwriting work in association with producer Norman Whitfield; together, they penned such songs as "I Heard It Through the Grapevine", "War", "Just My Imagination (Running Away with Me)", and "Papa Was a Rollin' Stone".

In 2004, Strong was inducted into the Songwriters Hall of Fame alongside Whitfield.

== Early life ==
Strong was born in West Point, Mississippi, on February 5, 1941, the only boy of six children born to Barrett Strong Sr., a minister. His family moved to Detroit, Michigan, when he was four years old, and his father bought him a piano soon after. Strong began singing at Hutchins Intermediate School in Detroit, where his classmates included Aretha Franklin and Lamont Dozier.

== Career ==
=== Tamla Records and Motown ===
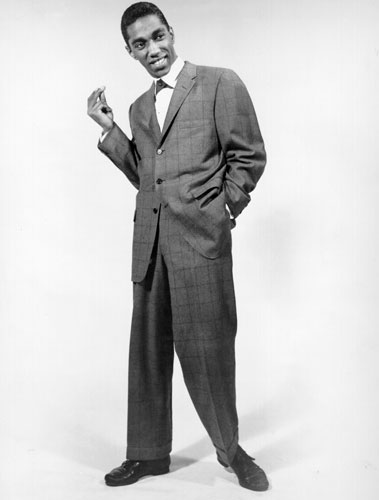
Publicity photo

Strong was among the first artists signed to Berry Gordy's fledgling label, Tamla Records, and was the performer (vocal and piano) on the company's first hit single, "Money (That's What I Want)", which was recorded live at the music studio where other legendary artists would eventually record. The song reached No. 2 US R&B in 1960. Gordy later disputed claims that Barrett had part in writing this song, stating that Strong's name was only included because of a clerical error. The single was originally released on Tamla, Motown's first label, but was then leased to the Anna label as it was getting airplay, and it was on the Anna label that it was a hit. It sold over one million copies, and was awarded a gold disc by the RIAA.

"Money" was later recorded by a number of acts, including the Beatles, the Rolling Stones, Led Zeppelin, the Kingsmen, Richard Wylie and His Band, Jerry Lee Lewis, the Searchers, the Flying Lizards, the Sonics, and Buddy Guy. Strong expressed that he co-wrote "Money" with Gordy and Janie Bradford; and his name appears on the song's original copyright registration with the United States Copyright Office.

In the mid-1960s, Strong became a Motown writer lyricist, teaming with producer Norman Whitfield. Together, they wrote some of the most successful and critically acclaimed soul songs ever to be released by Motown, including "I Heard It Through the Grapevine" by both Marvin Gaye and Gladys Knight & the Pips; "War" by Edwin Starr; "Wherever I Lay My Hat (That's My Home)" by Marvin Gaye; "Smiling Faces Sometimes" by the Undisputed Truth; and the long line of "psychedelic soul" records by the Temptations, including "Cloud Nine", "I Can't Get Next to You", "Psychedelic Shack", "Ball of Confusion (That's What the World Is Today)", and "Papa Was a Rollin' Stone", amongst others.

Strong received a Grammy Award for Best R&B Song in 1973 for "Papa Was a Rollin' Stone". Strong and Whitfield also co-wrote the ballad "Just My Imagination (Running Away with Me)", a 1971 Billboard No. 1 that also marked the last Temptations single to feature original members Eddie Kendricks and Paul Williams.

=== Albums and founding Blarritt Records ===
After Motown moved its operations base from Detroit, Michigan, to Los Angeles, California, Strong left the label and resumed his singing career. He signed with Epic in 1972. Strong left the label for Capitol Records, where he recorded two albums in the 1970s: Stronghold (1975) and Live & Love (1976). The former reached No. 47 on Billboard's Black Albums chart.

In the 1980s, Strong recorded "Rock It Easy" on an independent label, and wrote "You Can Depend on Me", which appeared on the Dells' The Second Time album (1988). In 1995, Strong founded the record label Blarritt Records. He founded the company as a means of providing opportunity and support for aspiring musicians in Detroit; he stated, "Young people were always coming to me: 'Can you help us get something going?' I thought, 'Wow, there's still so much talent here. They just don't have anywhere to go.'" In 2001, he released the album Stronghold II, which he wrote and composed in collaboration with vocalist Eliza Neals, through Blarritt. The album would later be re-released in 2008 for digital distribution on iTunes.

=== Later career ===
Alongside Whitfield, Strong was inducted into the Songwriters Hall of Fame in 2004.

In 2010, Strong appeared in "Misery", his first music video in his fifty years of recording music, co-produced by Eliza Neals and Martin "Tino" Gross with Strong at the helm.

== Death ==
Strong died at home in the La Jolla district of San Diego, California, on January 28, 2023, aged 81. He was survived by seven children and ten grandchildren. His wife of 35 years, Sandy White, died in 2002.

== Discography ==
=== Albums ===
Title	Album details	Peak chart positions		Ref(s)
Title	Album details	US	US R&B	Ref(s)
Stronghold	Released: 1975; Label: Capitol (ST-11376); Format: LP	—	47	
Live & Love	Released: 1976; Label: Capitol (ST-11490); Format: LP	—	—	
Love Is You	Released: 1987; Label: Cherie (CR-LP-2007); Format: LP	—	—	
Stronghold II	Released: 2001; Label: Blarritt (1310); Format: CD	—	—	

=== Singles ===
Year	Title	Peak chart positions					Ref(s)
Year	Title	US	US R&B	CAN	FRA	UK	Ref(s)
1959	"Let's Rock" / "Do the Very Best You Can"	—	—	—	—	—	
1959	"Money (That's What I Want)" / "Oh I Apologize"	23	2	—	—	—	
1960	"Yes, No, Maybe So" / "You Knows What to Do"	—	—	—	—	—	
1960	"Whirlwind" (with the Rayber Voices) / "I'm Gonna Cry (If You Quit Me)"	—	—	—	—	—	
1961	"Money and Me" / "You Got What It Takes"	—	—	—	—	—	
1961	"Misery" / "Two Wrongs Don't Make a Right"	—	—	—	—	—	
1962	"Seven Sins" / "What Went Wrong"	—	—	—	—	—	
1964	"Make Up Your Mind" / "I Better Run"	—	—	—	—	—	
1967	"I Heard It Through the Grapevine"; Recorded by Gladys Knight & the Pips; Co-written with Norman Whitfield	2	—	—	—	47	
1967	"I Heard It Through the Grapevine"; Recorded by Marvin Gaye; Co-written with Whitfield	1	—	8	88	1	
1971	"Just My Imagination"; Recorded by the Temptations; Co-written with Whitfield	1	1	72	—	8	
1972	"Papa Was a Rollin' Stone"; Recorded by the Undisputed Truth; Co-written with Whitfield	63	24	—	—	—	
1972	"Papa Was a Rollin' Stone"; Recorded by the Temptations; Co-written with Whitfield	1	—	12	42	8	
1973	"Stand Up and Cheer for the Preacher" / (Instrumental version)	—	82	—	—	—	
1975	"Surrender" / "There's Something About You"	—	—	—	—	—	
1975	"Is It True" / "Anywhere"	—	45	—	—	—	
1976	"Man Up in the Sky" / "Gonna Make It Right"	—	—	—	—	—	
1980	"Love Is You" / "You Make Me Feel the Way I Do"	—	—	—	—	—	
1981	"Rock It Easy" / "Love Will Make It Alright"	—	—	—	—	—	

== See also ==
- List of 1960s one-hit wonders in the United States
