= The Undisputed Truth =

American musical group

- The Undisputed Truth, c. 1971; Clockwise from top: Joe Harris, Brenda Joyce Evans, Billie Rae Calvin

Background information
- Genres: Psychedelic soul; psychedelic funk; R&B
- Labels: Gordy; Whitfield
- Past members: Joe Harris; Billie Rae Calvin; Brenda Joyce Evans; Virginia McDonald; Tyrone Douglas; Tyrone Barkley; Calvin Stephenson; Taka Boom; Marcy Thomas; Melvin Stewart; Lloyd Williams

The Undisputed Truth was an American Motown recording act assembled by record producer Norman Whitfield to experiment with his psychedelic soul production techniques. Joe "Pep" Harris served as main lead singer, with Billie Rae Calvin and Brenda Joyce Evans on additional leads and background vocals.

== History ==
In the 1960s, Billie Calvin and Brenda Evans had been part of a Los Angeles-based group called the Delicates. They were introduced to Motown by singer Bobby Taylor, so when the Delicates broke up in 1970, the two began providing background vocals for artists around Motown. They sang backing on the hits "Ain't No Mountain High Enough" for Diana Ross and "Still Water (Love)" for the Four Tops. Joe Harris had been part of a Detroit soul group called The Fabulous Peps. Formed in 1962, the group was renowned for their energetic stage performances, and they cut a handful of singles for various different labels before their dissolution in 1968. Harris also became a member of the Ohio Untouchables (later the Ohio Players). In 1970, Motown producer Norman Whitfield – partly as a response to criticism from Temptations fans that he was using the group as his personal plaything – put together Joe Harris, Billie Calvin, and Brenda Evans to create his own recording act, the Undisputed Truth.

The group's music and unusual costuming (large Afros and white makeup) typified the then-popular trend of "psychedelic soul", which Whitfield had inaugurated. A number of their singles became minor hits, and many of them were also songs for Whitfield's main act, the Temptations, among them 1971's "You Make Your Own Heaven and Hell Right Here on Earth" and "Papa Was a Rollin' Stone". Their single top-40 hit in the United States was the ominous "Smiling Faces Sometimes", originally recorded by The Temptations, which hit number three on the Billboard Hot 100 in mid-1971.

Although they could never recreate the success of "Smiling Faces Sometimes", they continued to make chart appearances throughout the early 1970s. They found some success with songs such as "What It Is" (1972) and "Law of the Land" (1973) becoming modest hits on the US R&B Chart. In 1973, nevertheless, dissatisfied with the lack of major success, Brenda Evans left. She was briefly replaced by singer Diane Evans, but both Billie Calvin and she then left. Norman Whitfield subsequently took the opportunity to expand the group, and Joe Harris was joined by Virginia "Vee" McDonald, Tyrone "Big Ty" Douglas, Tyrone "Lil Ty" Barkley, and Calvin "Dhaak" Stephenson. The latter four were all members of The Magic Tones, a Detroit soul group with similarities to George Clinton's pre-Funkadelic Parliament. Vee McDonald is also the niece of Miracles member Warren "Pete" Moore.

This new group scored several minor hits of their own, such as "Help Yourself" and "I'm a Fool for You" (both 1974). "Help Yourself" became their second top-20 R&B hit, peaking at number 19, and reached number 63 on the Hot 100, the highest position attained by any Undisputed Truth record for Motown besides their hit "Smiling Faces Sometimes". In 1975, the group's costuming and style changed, becoming even more unusual and Funkadelic-influenced. Their final albums for Motown, Cosmic Truth and Higher Than High (both 1975), yielded minor R&B chartings.

The Undisputed Truth, along with Rose Royce and Willie Hutch, followed Whitfield during his exodus from Motown to set up Whitfield Records in 1975. Both Vee McDonald and Tyrone Douglas then left. The group went through many personnel changes thereafter, although original member Joe Harris remained with the group throughout. Taka Boom, Chaka Khan's sister, took over as female lead singer for 1976's Method to the Madness. Marcy Thomas replaced her for 1979's Smokin'. Melvin Stewart and Lloyd Williams replaced Calvin Stevenson and Tyrone Barkley for the group's last album. Former member Billie Calvin later wrote songs for Whitfield's other group, Rose Royce, including the hit single "Wishing on a Star".

The group had relatively little success at their new label, and faded into obscurity after two more albums. They did make their only entry into the UK Singles Chart in January 1977 (number 43) with the disco single "You + Me = Love", from the album Method to the Madness. The song reached number 48 on the American Billboard Hot 100, their second-highest position ever on the chart. The Undisputed Truth nevertheless disbanded in the early 1980s following the collapse of Whitfield Records. Several former members became part of another Norman Whitfield-assembled group, Dream Machine, who had one album released, Dream Machine, and two singles, "Don't Walk Away" and "Shakedown", all in 1981.

In 1990, Joe Harris and Brenda Evans revived the group with singer Belita Woods, and recorded for Ian Levine's Motown revival label Motorcity Records. They recorded a new version of their 1973 song "Law of the Land", which was released as a 12-inch single (the group's last single) in 1991. Members Billie Calvin and Vee McDonald also made separate solo recordings for the same label, and all three feature on the Tribute to Norman Whitfield album, a Motorcity compilation CD released in September 1996. McDonald recorded a song entitled "You're My Loveline" (co-written by former Motown lyricists Janie Bradford and Marilyn McLeod), which was released in the UK. Joe Harris continues to perform and has recently worked with the UK-based Stone Foundation band.

== Discography ==
=== Albums ===
Year	Album	Peak chart positions		Label and catalog number	
Year	Album	US Pop	US R&B	Label and catalog number	
1971	The Undisputed Truth	43	7	Gordy (Motown)	G 955L
1972	Face to Face with the Truth	114	16	Gordy (Motown)	G 959L
1973	Law of the Land	191	52	Gordy (Motown)	G 963L
1974	Down to Earth	—	35	Gordy (Motown)	G6 968S1
1975	Cosmic Truth	186	42	Gordy (Motown)	G6 970S1
1975	Higher Than High	173	52	Gordy (Motown)	G6 972S1
1976	Method to the Madness	66	19	Whitfield	WH 2967
1979	Smokin'	—	—	Whitfield	WHK 3202
2019	Truth Gon' Set You Free				
"—" denotes releases that did not chart

=== Singles ===
Year	Title and catalogue number	Peak chart positions					Album	Label
Year	Title and catalogue number	US	US R&B	US Dance	US AC	UK	Album	Label
1971	"Save My Love for a Rainy Day" (G 7106) b/w "Since I've Lost You"	—	43	—	—	—	The Undisputed Truth	Gordy (Motown)
1971	"Smiling Faces Sometimes" (G 7108) b/w "You Got the Love I Need"	3	2	—	34	—	The Undisputed Truth	Gordy (Motown)
1971	"You Make Your Own Heaven and Hell Right Here on Earth" (G 7112F) b/w "Ball of Confusion (That's What the World Is Today)"	72	24	—	—	—	Face to Face with the Truth	Gordy (Motown)
1972	"What It Is" (G 7114F) b/w "California Soul"	71	35	—	—	—	Face to Face with the Truth	Gordy (Motown)
1972	"Superstar (Remember How You Got Where You Are)" (UK-only) (TMG 818) b/w "Ain't No Sun Since You've Been Gone"	—	—	—	—	—	Face to Face with the Truth	Gordy (Motown)
1972	"Papa Was a Rollin' Stone" (G 7117F) b/w "Friendship Train"	63	24	—	—	—	Law of the Land	Gordy (Motown)
1973	"Girl, You're Alright" (G 7122F) b/w "With a Little Help from My Friends"	107	43	—	—	—	Law of the Land	Gordy (Motown)
1973	"Law of the Land" (G 7130F) b/w "Just My Imagination (Running Away with Me)"	—	40	—	—	—	Law of the Land	Gordy (Motown)
1973	"Mama I Got a Brand New Thing (Don't Say No)" (G 7124F) b/w "Gonna Keep on Tryin' 'Til I Win Your Love"	109	46	—	—	—	Law of the Land	Gordy (Motown)
1974	"Help Yourself" (G 7134F) b/w "What's Going on"	63	19	—	—	—	Down to Earth	Gordy (Motown)
1974	"I'm a Fool for You" (G 7139F) b/w "The Girl's Alright with Me"	—	39	—	—	—	Down to Earth	Gordy (Motown)
1974	"Lil' Red Ridin' Hood" (G 7140F) b/w "Big John is My Name"	106	—	—	—	—	Cosmic Truth	Gordy (Motown)
1975	"UFO's" (G 7143F) b/w "Got to Get My Hands on Some Lovin'"	—	62	—	—	—	Cosmic Truth	Gordy (Motown)
1975	"Higher Than High" (G 7145F) b/w "Spaced Out"	—	77	—	—	—	Higher Than High	Gordy (Motown)
1976	"You + Me = Love" (WHI 8231) b/w "You + Me = Love (Instrumental)"	48	37	5	—	43	Method to the Madness	Whitfield
1976	"Let's Go Down to the Disco" (WHI 8295) b/w "Loose"	—	68	40	—	—	Method to the Madness	Whitfield
1977	"Sunshine" (WHI 8362) b/w "Hole in the Wall"	109	—	—	—	—	Method to the Madness	Whitfield
1979	"Show Time (Part I)" (WHI 8781) b/w "Show Time (Part II)"	—	55	—	—	—	Smokin'	Whitfield
1979	"I Can't Get Enough of Your Love" (WHI 8873) b/w "Misunderstood"	—	—	—	—	—	Smokin'	Whitfield
The albums noted are where the A-Sides come from "—" denotes a single that was not released in that territory or did not chart
