= Norman Whitfield =

American musical artist and producer (1940–2008)

- Born: Norman Jesse Whitfield; May 12, 1940; Harlem, New York, New York, U.S.
- Died: September 16, 2008 (aged 68) Los Angeles County, California, U.S.
- Genres: R&B; soul; pop; psychedelic soul; funk; disco
- Occupations: Songwriter, record producer, arranger
- Instruments: Keyboards, tambourine
- Years active: 1958–1986
- Labels: Motown, Whitfield

Norman Jesse Whitfield (May 12, 1940 – September 16, 2008) was an American songwriter, composer, and producer, who worked with Berry Gordy's Motown labels during the 1960s. He has been credited as one of the creators of the Motown Sound and of the late-1960s subgenre of psychedelic soul.

During his 25-year career, Whitfield co-wrote and produced many enduring hits for Motown artists, including "Ain't Too Proud to Beg", "I Heard It Through the Grapevine", "War", "Ball of Confusion (That's What the World Is Today)", "Just My Imagination (Running Away with Me)" and "Papa Was a Rollin' Stone". Whitfield worked extensively with the Temptations as a producer and songwriter, producing eight of their albums between 1969 and 1973. He then started his own label, Whitfield Records, in 1975, which yielded the Rose Royce hit "Car Wash". Alongside his Motown lyrical collaborator Barrett Strong, he was inducted into the Songwriters Hall of Fame in 2004. He wrote or co-wrote 61 hits on the UK charts and 92 on the US charts. In 2024, Whitfield was posthumously selected for induction into the Rock and Roll Hall of Fame in the musical excellence category. Whitfield was also inducted into the National Rhythm & Blues Hall of Fame in 2021.

== Early life and education ==
Whitfield was born and raised in Harlem, New York, and spent much of his teen years in local pool halls. In his late teens, he and his family moved to Detroit, Michigan where he attended Northwestern High School.

== Career ==
At 19, Whitfield began frequenting Motown's Hitsville USA offices for a chance to work for the growing label. Founder Berry Gordy Jr. recognized Whitfield's persistence and hired him for the quality control department, which determined which songs would or would not be released. Whitfield joined Motown's in-house songwriting staff, co-writing the Marvin Gaye hit "Pride and Joy", the Marvelettes's "Too Many Fish in the Sea" and the Velvelettes's "Needle in a Haystack". He took over Smokey Robinson's role as the main producer for the Temptations in 1966, after his "Ain't Too Proud to Beg" performed better than Robinson's "Get Ready" on the pop charts.

=== The Temptations ===
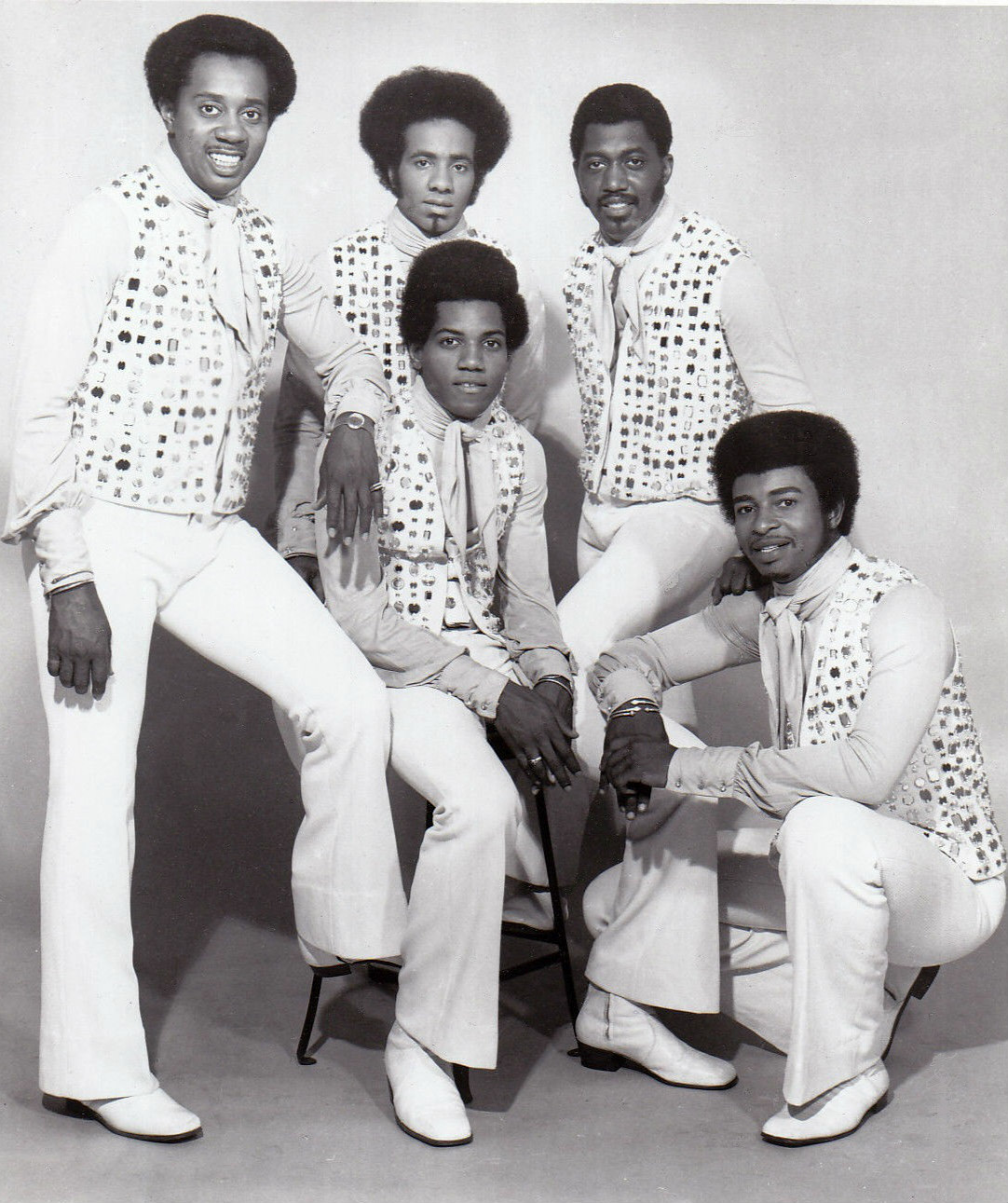
The Temptations in 1971, during the time Whitfield produced for them

From 1963 to 1974, Whitfield produced virtually all of the Temptations' music, experimenting with sound effects and other production techniques. He found a songwriting collaborator in lyricist Barrett Strong, the performer on Motown's first hit record, "Money (That's What I Want)", and wrote material for the Temptations and other Motown artists such as Marvin Gaye and Gladys Knight & the Pips, both of whom recorded Whitfield-produced hit versions of the Whitfield/Strong composition "I Heard It Through the Grapevine". The Gladys Knight & the Pips' version was the best-selling Motown single so far, but it was surpassed a year later by Gaye's version. In 1969, Whitfield won three BMI Awards for the songs "I Heard It Through the Grapevine", "I Wish It Would Rain", and "You're My Everything".

=== "Psychedelic soul" ===
After Temptations lead singer David Ruffin was replaced by Dennis Edwards in 1968, Whitfield moved the group into a harder, darker sound that featured a blend of psychedelic rock and funk heavily inspired by the work of Sly & the Family Stone and Funkadelic. He added contemporary song topics, moving from love songs to the social issues of the time, such as war, poverty and politics. The first Temptations single to feature this new psychedelic soul style was "Cloud Nine" in late 1968, which earned Motown its first Grammy Award for Best Rhythm & Blues Performance by a Duo or Group, Vocal or Instrumental.

The psychedelic soul records Whitfield produced for the Temptations and other artists such as Edwin Starr and the Undisputed Truth experimented with and updated the Motown sound for the late-1960s. Longer songs, distorted guitars, multitracked drums, and inventive vocal arrangements became trademarks of Whitfield's productions, and later of records produced by Motown staffers he coached, including Frank Wilson. But friction and antagonism grew between Whitfield and the Temptations; the group hated how Whitfield put more emphasis on the instrumentation instead of their vocals, and that he was writing fewer romantic ballads for them.

Whitfield often recorded notably different versions of songs with different artists in search of a hit, and did so successfully in the cases of Edwin Starr, with "War" (1970; originally recorded by the Temptations), and the Undisputed Truth, with "Smiling Faces Sometimes" (1971; also originally by the Temptations). "Papa Was a Rollin' Stone" (1972) was done first by the Undisputed Truth, before Whitfield rerecorded the song with the Temptations for a longer, more definitive (and massively successful) version. The Temptations' version earned a second Grammy Award for Best R&B Vocal Performance by a Duo or Group for Whitfield and the Temptations, and Whitfield and Strong shared the songwriters' award for Best Rhythm and Blues Song. The single's instrumental B-side earned Whitfield and arranger Paul Riser a Grammy Award for Best R&B Instrumental Performance,

One of Whitfield's last major hits at Motown was Yvonne Fair's "It Should Have Been Me" (1975), a song he had written in 1963 and recorded originally with Kim Weston.

=== Whitfield Records and later years ===
In 1975, Whitfield left Motown, following its move from Detroit, to form his own label, Whitfield Records. His first act was the Undisputed Truth, whom he had convinced to leave Motown, followed by Rose Royce, Willie Hutch, Yvonne Fair, Nytro, Mammatapee and Junior Walker. The Undisputed Truth scored their second biggest hit in 1976 with the disco song "You + Me = Love", their first single on Whitfield Records. Norman Whitfield had an international smash hit in 1976 with Rose Royce's "Car Wash", issued on MCA Records. Rose Royce (whose members were originally Edwin Starr's backing band while at Motown) went on to record three more popular albums, and had two huge UK hits with "Wishing on a Star" (1977) and "Love Don't Live Here Anymore" (1978), but could never top the success of "Car Wash", which served as the theme song to the 1976 motion picture Car Wash. The Car Wash soundtrack won Whitfield a Grammy Award for Best Album of Best Original Score Written for a Motion Picture or a Television Special. He also composed the theme song for the 1977 motion picture Which Way Is Up?, performed by Stargard. He produced soul group Masterpiece in 1980.

In the early 1980s, Whitfield began working as a producer for Motown again, helming the Temptations' 1983 hit single "Sail Away" and the soundtrack to The Last Dragon.

On January 18, 2005, Whitfield pleaded guilty for failing to report royalty income he earned from 1995 to 1999 to the Internal Revenue Service. Facing charges of tax evasion on more than $2 million worth of income, he was sentenced to six months of house confinement and a $25,000 fine. He was not imprisoned because of health problems such as diabetes.

During his last months alive, Whitfield was bed-ridden at Los Angeles's Cedars-Sinai Medical Center, where he underwent treatment for diabetes and other ailments. Whitfield fell into a coma, briefly improved, but eventually succumbed to diabetic complications. Whitfield died on September 16, 2008. He is interred in Forest Lawn Memorial Park in Hollywood Hills.

== Discography ==
=== Selected singles production/songwriting credits ===
- 1963: "Pride & Joy" – Marvin Gaye (US #10, US R&B #2)
- 1964: "Too Many Fish in the Sea" – The Marvelettes (US #25, US R&B #5)
- 1964: "Needle in a Haystack" – The Velvelettes (US #45)
- 1964: "He Was Really Sayin' Somethin'" – The Velvelettes (US #64, US R&B #21)
- 1964: "Girl (Why You Wanna Make Me Blue)" – The Temptations (US #26, US R&B #11)
- 1966: "Ain't Too Proud to Beg" – The Temptations (US #13, US R&B #1, UK #21)
- 1966: "Beauty Is Only Skin Deep" – The Temptations (US #3, US R&B #1, UK #18)
- 1966: "(I Know) I'm Losing You" – The Temptations (US #8, US R&B #1, UK #19)
- 1967: "I Heard It Through the Grapevine" – Gladys Knight & the Pips (US #2, US R&B #1), also recorded by Marvin Gaye (US #1, US R&B #1, UK #1)
- 1967: "You're My Everything" – The Temptations (US #6, US R&B #3, UK #26)
- 1967: "I Wish It Would Rain" – The Temptations (US #4, US R&B #1), also recorded by Gladys Knight & the Pips (US #41, US R&B #15)
- 1968: "I Could Never Love Another (After Loving You)" – The Temptations (US #13, US R&B #1)
- 1968: "The End of Our Road" – Gladys Knight & the Pips (US #15, US R&B #5), also recorded by Marvin Gaye (US #40, US R&B #7)
- 1968: "Cloud Nine" – The Temptations (US #6, UK #15)
- 1968: "The Nitty Gritty" – Gladys Knight & the Pips (US #19, US R&B #2)
- 1969: "Friendship Train" – Gladys Knight & the Pips (US #17, US R&B #2)
- 1969: "Runaway Child, Running Wild" – The Temptations (US #6, US R&B #1)
- 1969: "Too Busy Thinking About My Baby" – Marvin Gaye (US #4, US R&B #1, UK #5), originally recorded by the Temptations
- 1969: "I Can't Get Next to You" – The Temptations (US #1, US R&B #1, UK #13)
- 1969: "Don't Let the Joneses Get You Down" – The Temptations (US #20, US R&B #2)
- 1970: "You Need Love Like I Do (Don't You)" – Gladys Knight & the Pips (US #35, US R&B #3), also recorded by the Temptations
- 1970: "Psychedelic Shack" – The Temptations (US #7, US R&B #2, UK #33)
- 1970: "Ball of Confusion (That's What the World Is Today)" – The Temptations (US #3, US R&B #2, UK #7)
- 1970: "War" – Edwin Starr (US #1, US R&B #3, UK #3), originally recorded by the Temptations
- 1971: "Smiling Faces Sometimes" – The Undisputed Truth (US #3, US R&B #2), originally recorded by the Temptations
- 1971: "Just My Imagination (Running Away with Me)" – The Temptations (US #1, US R&B #1, UK #8)
- 1972: "Papa Was a Rollin' Stone" – The Temptations (US #1, US R&B #1, UK #8), originally recorded by the Undisputed Truth (US #63, US R&B #24)
- 1973: "Masterpiece" – The Temptations (US #7, US R&B #1)
- 1973: "Law of the Land" – The Temptations (UK #41), also recorded by the Undisputed Truth (US R&B #40)
- 1973: "Let Your Hair Down" – The Temptations (US #27, US R&B #1)
- 1974: "Help Yourself" – The Undisputed Truth (US #63, US R&B #19)
- 1975: "It Should Have Been Me" – Yvonne Fair (US #85, UK #5), also recorded by Gladys Knight & the Pips (US #40, US R&B #9)
- 1976: "Car Wash" – Rose Royce (US #1, UK #9)
- 1976: "You + Me = Love" – The Undisputed Truth (US #48, US R&B #37, UK #43)
- 1976: "I'm Going Down" – Rose Royce (US #70, US R&B #10)
- 1976: "I Wanna Get Next to You" – Rose Royce (US #10)
- 1977: "Ooh Boy" – Rose Royce (US #72, US R&B #3, UK #46)
- 1977: "Wishing on a Star" – Rose Royce (UK #3)
- 1977: "Theme Song from 'Which Way Is Up'" - Stargard (Aus #79, US #21, NL #20)
- 1978: "Love Don't Live Here Anymore" – Rose Royce (US #32, UK #2)
