= List of Rare Earth band members =

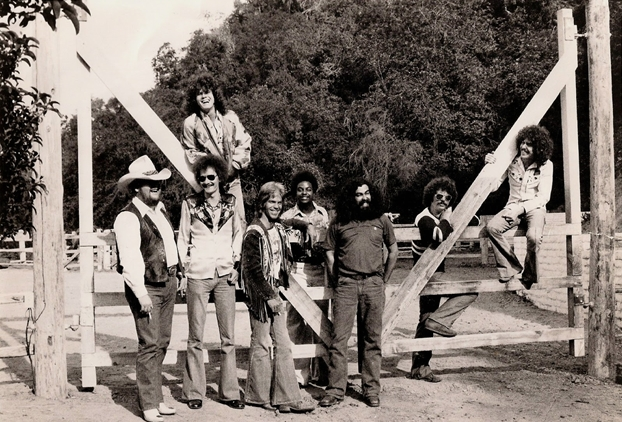
Rare Earth in 1973.

Rare Earth is an American psychedelic rock band from Detroit, Michigan. Formed in 1968, the group originally consisted of drummer and vocalist Peter Rivera, bassist John Parrish, saxophonist Gil Bridges, guitarist Rod Richards, and keyboardist Kenny James. As of the band's 2023 reformation following Bridges' death in 2021, the group features rhythm guitarist and vocalist Wayne Baraks (previously a member from 1987 to 1994), keyboardist Mike Bruner (a member since 1998), lead guitarist Dan Medawar, bassist Ron Cousineau, drummer Keith Christian and percussionist Ronnie Nelson (all new additions), plus saxophonist and vocalist Jay "Mocha Man" Waller (since 2025).

== History ==
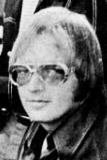
Peter Rivera was Rare Earth's primary lead vocalist during its early years.

=== 1968–1974 ===
Rare Earth evolved from an earlier group called The Sunliners formed in 1960, going through a number of personnel changes before changing its name in 1968. The inaugural lineup of the band included Sunliners founding members Peter Rivera (on drums, percussion and lead vocals) and Gil Bridges (on saxophone, flute and percussion), alongside 1962 addition John Parrish (on bass and trombone) and 1966 arrivals Rod Richards (on guitar) and Kenny James (on keyboards). Rare Earth released its debut Dreams/Answers in November 1968, followed by Get Ready in September 1969. Shortly thereafter, the band expanded to a six-piece with the addition of Eddie Guzman on percussion. Two more albums followed – the soundtrack to the film Generation (1969) and Ecology (1970) – before Richards and James were replaced by Ray Monette and Mark Olson, respectively, in April 1971.

With its new lineup, Rare Earth issued One World and its first live album Rare Earth in Concert in 1971, before Parrish was replaced by Mike Urso after the band relocated to Los Angeles, California along with its record label Motown. The new lineup issued Willie Remembers in 1972 and Ma in 1973, before the group splintered in July 1974 due to what was described in a subsequent lawsuit as "a schism among the band members". Rivera reportedly left the group on July 11, 1974, with Urso following him out of the band. The pair later challenged the remaining members for control and use of the Rare Earth name, but their case was thrown out in 1975 after a series of lawsuits which ended with Bridges, Monette, Olson and Guzman retaining the rights. Rivera, Urso and keyboardist Tom Baird, who had produced several Rare Earth releases, subsequently formed the band HUB.

=== 1974–1985 ===
In August 1974, Rare Earth announced the additions of three new members to replace Rivera and Urso: former Blood, Sweat & Tears vocalist Jerry LaCroix, former Sweathog drummer Barry "Frosty" Smith, and former Stevie Wonder bassist Reggie McBride. By early 1975, Olson had been replaced by Gabe Katona, while Paul Warren had joined as a second guitarist. All five new members debuted on the 1975 release Back to Earth. After the album's release, Warren and Frost both left the band, with the drummer replaced for the subsequent tour by Chet McCracken. For the 1976 album Midnight Lady, Frank Westbrook replaced Katona, while drums were contributed by Frosty and session drummer Ollie E. Brown.

Following Rivera's 1974 departure, Gil Bridges became the sole remaining original member of Rare Earth.

In late 1976, Rare Earth was signed to Prodigal Records by returning Motown executive Barney Ales. In preparation for the band's first album on the label, departed members Pete Rivera and Mike Urso returned to the band, joining existing members Bridges and Guzman, plus new arrivals Dan Ferguson (guitar) and Ron Fransen (keyboards), to record Rarearth. According to Monette, keyboardist Mark Olson also returned at the beginning of recording, but both members left around halfway through the process. Shortly after the album's release, Monette and Olson returned again, marking a full reunion of the 1972–1974 lineup. The reformed group released two albums, Band Together and Grand Slam, during 1978.

Urso was replaced by Ken Johnston between June 1979 and June 1981 due to contractual reasons, before returning for the recording of 1982's Tight and Hot, which received a limited release in Canada only. During 1983, both Rivera and Urso left the band again. The lineups of Rare Earth from 1983 to 1985 are not well documented, but a discussion on the band's forum in 2011 including several members concluded that bass was handled from September 1983 by Tim Ellsworth for a year, followed by Andy Merrild for nine months, then Ellsworth again for three months, before Randy "Bird" Burghdoff joined in September 1985. Rivera remained for the first few months of Ellsworth's tenure, after which drums were handled by someone called Tony (surname possibly Thomas), followed by Bob Weaver, then Bobby Rock, Weaver again, and finally Jerry LeBloch just before Burghdoff's arrival.

=== Since 1985 ===
Rick Warner replaced Mark Olson in 1986 and Wayne Baraks joined the following year on second guitar and co-lead vocals with Bridges. This lineup released the live album Made in Switzerland in 1989, shortly before LeBloch was replaced by Dean Boucher. The new drummer contributed to the group's first studio album in more than ten years, 1993's Different World, before himself being replaced by Floyd Stokes Jr., who also took on co-lead vocal duties. That same year, Eddie Guzman died after spending over 20 years in the band. 1994 saw the departure of Baraks from the group. In 1998, Mike Bruner replaced Warner on keyboards.

Rare Earth's lineup remained stable until 2004, when long-time guitarist Ray Monette left to join The Funk Brothers on tour. He was replaced by Ivan Greilick. With this lineup, the band issued its first two studio albums since 1993: Rare Earth in 2005 and A Brand New World in 2008. The following year, Monette returned to the group for his final stint. He remained active until early 2017, when he retired from performing due to ongoing problems with back pain. His replacement was Jerry "Lew" Patterson. Monette later died in April 2026. Rare Earth remained active until December 2021, when sole remaining original member Gil Bridges died due to complications from COVID-19.

Following Bridges' death, Rare Earth disbanded, before his widow Johnnie Sue Bridges decided to rebuild the group in late 2022. By March 2023, the new band had been unveiled with a lineup including returning members Wayne Baraks and Mike Bruner, along with new additions Michael "Rollo" Rollin on saxophone, flute and co-lead vocals, Dan Medawar on lead guitar, Ron Cousineau on bass, Keith Christian on drums, and Ronnie Nelson on percussion. Rollin was replaced in the fall of 2026 by Jay "Mocha Man" Waller, while Cousineau was replaced by

== Members ==
=== Current ===
Image	Name	Years active	Instruments	Release contributions
	Wayne Baraks	1987–1994; 2023–present	rhythm and lead guitars; lead and backing vocals	Made in Switzerland (1989); Different World (1993)
	Mike Bruner	1998–2021; 2023–present	keyboards	Rare Earth (2005); A Brand New World (2008); Rare Earth Live (2009)
	Dan Medawar	2023–present	lead and rhythm guitars; backing vocals	none to date
	Ron Cousineau	2023–present	bass; backing vocals	none to date
	Keith Christian	2023–present	drums; backing vocals	none to date
	Ronnie Nelson	2023–present	congas; percussion	none to date
	Jay "Mocha Man" Waller	2025–present	saxophone; flute; percussion; lead and backing vocals	none to date

=== Former ===
Image	Name	Years active	Instruments	Release contributions
	Gil Bridges (1941–2021)	1968–2021	saxophone; flute; percussion; keyboards; vocals (lead from 1985)	all Rare Earth releases from Dreams/Answers (1968) to Rare Earth Live (2009)
	Peter Rivera (Peter Hoorelbeke)	1968–1974; 1976–1983	drums; percussion; lead and backing vocals	all Rare Earth releases from Dreams/Answers (1968) to Live in Chicago (1974), and from Rarearth (1977) to Tight and Hot (1982)
	John Parrish (aka. John Persh) (1942–1981)	1968–1972	bass; trombone; backing vocals	all Rare Earth releases from Dreams/Answers (1968) to Rare Earth in Concert (1971)
	Rod Richards	1968–1971	guitar; backing vocals	all Rare Earth releases from Dreams/Answers (1968) to Ecology (1970)
	Kenny James (Kenneth Folcik)	1968–1971	keyboards; backing vocals	all Rare Earth releases from Dreams/Answers (1968) to Ecology (1970)
	Eddie Guzman (1944–1993)	1969–1993	congas; percussion	all Rare Earth releases from Generation (1969) to Different World (1993)
	Ray Monette (1946–2026)	1971–1977; 1977–2004; 2009–2017	guitar; backing vocals	all Rare Earth releases from One World (1971) to Different World (1993), except Rarearth (1977)
	Mark Olson (1950–1991)	1971–1975; 1976–1977; 1977–1986	keyboards; harmonica; vocals (co-lead from 1983)	all Rare Earth releases from One World (1971) to Live in Chicago (1974), and from Band Together (1978) to Tight and Hot (1982)
	Mike Urso	1972–1974; 1976–1979; 1981–1983	bass; backing vocals	Willie Remembers (1972); Ma (1973); Live in Chicago (1974); Rarearth (1977); Band Together (1978); Grand Slam (1978); Tight and Hot (1982)
	Jerry LaCroix (1943–2014)	1974–1976	lead vocals; saxophone; flute; harmonica	Back to Earth (1975); Midnight Lady (1976)
	Reggie McBride	1974–1976	bass; backing vocals	Back to Earth (1975); Midnight Lady (1976); Grand Slam (1978)
	Barry "Frosty" Smith (1946–2017)	1974–1975	drums; percussion	Back to Earth (1975); Midnight Lady (1976)
	Gabe Katona	1975	keyboards; backing vocals	Back to Earth (1975)
	Paul Warren	1975	guitar; backing vocals	Back to Earth (1975)
	Chet McCracken (1946–2022)	1975	drums	none
	Frank Westbrook	1975–1976	keyboards	Midnight Lady (1976)
	Dan Ferguson	1977	guitar	Rarearth (1977)
	Ron Fransen	1977	keyboards	Rarearth (1977)
	Ken Johnston	1979–1981	bass; backing vocals	none
	Tim Ellsworth	1983–1984; 1985	bass; vocals (backing initially, then co-lead)	none
	Tony Thomas	1983–1984	drums	none
	Bobby Rock	1984	drums	none
	Bob Weaver	1984–1985	drums	none
	Andy Merrild	1984–1985	bass	none
	Jerry LeBloch (1949–2015)	1985–1989	drums	Made in Switzerland (1989)
	Randy "Bird" Burghdoff	1985–2021	bass; backing vocals	all releases from Made in Switzerland (1989) to Rare Earth Live (2009)
	Rick Warner	1986–1998	keyboards; backing vocals	Made in Switzerland (1989); Different World (1993)
	Dean Boucher	1989–1993	drums	Different World (1993)
	Floyd Stokes Jr.	1993–2021	drums; percussion; lead and backing vocals	Rare Earth (2005); A Brand New World (2008); Rare Earth Live (2009)
	Ivan Greilick	2004–2009	guitar; lead and backing vocals; occasional bass and keyboards	Rare Earth (2005); A Brand New World (2008)
	Jerry "Lew" Patterson	2017–2021	guitar; backing vocals	none
	Michael "Rollo" Rollin	2023–2025	saxophone; flute; percussion; lead and backing vocals	none

== Lineups ==
Period	Members	Releases
1968–1969	Peter Rivera — lead vocals, drums, percussion; Rod Richards — guitar, backing vocals; John Parrish — bass, trombone, backing vocals; Kenny James — keyboards, backing vocals; Gil Bridges — saxophone, flute, backing vocals	Dreams/Answers (1968); Get Ready (1969)
Late 1969–April 1971	Peter Rivera — lead vocals, drums, percussion; Rod Richards — guitar, backing vocals; John Parrish — bass, trombone, backing vocals; Kenny James — keyboards, backing vocals; Gil Bridges — saxophone, flute, backing vocals; Eddie Guzman — congas, percussion	Generation (1969); Ecology (1970)
April 1971–summer 1972	Peter Rivera — lead vocals, drums, percussion; Ray Monette — guitar, backing vocals; John Parrish — bass, trombone, backing vocals; Mark Olson — keyboards, backing vocals; Gil Bridges — saxophone, flute, backing vocals; Eddie Guzman — congas, percussion	One World (1971); Rare Earth in Concert (1971)
Summer 1972–July 1974	Peter Rivera — lead vocals, drums, percussion; Ray Monette — guitar, backing vocals; Mike Urso — bass, backing vocals; Mark Olson — keyboards, backing vocals; Gil Bridges — saxophone, flute, backing vocals; Eddie Guzman — congas, percussion	Willie Remembers (1972); Ma (1973); Live in Chicago (1974)
August 1974–early 1975	Jerry LaCroix — lead vocals, saxophone, flute; Ray Monette — guitar, backing vocals; Reggie McBride — bass, backing vocals; Mark Olson — keyboards, backing vocals; Gil Bridges — saxophone, flute, backing vocals; Barry Smith — drums, percussion; Eddie Guzman — congas, percussion	none
Early–summer 1975	Jerry LaCroix — lead vocals, saxophone, flute; Ray Monette — guitar, backing vocals; Paul Warren — guitar, backing vocals; Reggie McBride — bass, backing vocals; Gabe Katona — keyboards, backing vocals; Gil Bridges — saxophone, flute, backing vocals; Barry Smith — drums, percussion; Eddie Guzman — congas, percussion	Back to Earth (1975)
Summer–fall 1975	Jerry LaCroix — lead vocals, saxophone, flute; Ray Monette — guitar, backing vocals; Reggie McBride — bass, backing vocals; Gabe Katona — keyboards, backing vocals; Gil Bridges — saxophone, flute, backing vocals; Chet McCracken — drums; Eddie Guzman — congas, percussion	none
Late 1975–mid 1976	Jerry LaCroix — lead vocals, saxophone, flute; Ray Monette — guitar, backing vocals; Reggie McBride — bass, backing vocals; Frank Westbrook — keyboards; Gil Bridges — saxophone, flute, backing vocals; Ollie E. Brown — drums (session member); Eddie Guzman — congas, percussion	Midnight Lady (1976)
Late 1976–early 1977	Peter Rivera — lead vocals, drums, percussion; Ray Monette — guitar, backing vocals; Mike Urso — bass, backing vocals; Mark Olson — keyboards, backing vocals; Gil Bridges — saxophone, flute, backing vocals; Eddie Guzman — congas, percussion	none
Early–late 1977	Peter Rivera — lead vocals, drums, percussion; Dan Ferguson — guitar; Mike Urso — bass, backing vocals; Ron Fransen — keyboards; Gil Bridges — saxophone, flute, backing vocals; Eddie Guzman — congas, percussion	Rarearth (1977)
Late 1977–June 1979	Peter Rivera — lead vocals, drums, percussion; Ray Monette — guitar, backing vocals; Mike Urso — bass, backing vocals; Mark Olson — keyboards, backing vocals; Gil Bridges — saxophone, flute, backing vocals; Eddie Guzman — congas, percussion	Band Together (1978); Grand Slam (1978)
June 1979–June 1981	Peter Rivera — lead vocals, drums, percussion; Ray Monette — guitar, backing vocals; Ken Johnston — bass, backing vocals; Mark Olson — keyboards, backing vocals; Gil Bridges — saxophone, flute, backing vocals; Eddie Guzman — congas, percussion	none
June 1981–1983	Peter Rivera — lead vocals, drums, percussion; Ray Monette — guitar, backing vocals; Mike Urso — bass, backing vocals; Mark Olson — keyboards, backing vocals; Gil Bridges — saxophone, flute, backing vocals; Eddie Guzman — congas, percussion	Tight and Hot (1982)
September–late 1983	Peter Rivera — lead vocals, drums, percussion; Ray Monette — guitar, backing vocals; Tim Ellsworth — bass, backing vocals; Mark Olson — keyboards, backing vocals; Gil Bridges — saxophone, flute, backing vocals; Eddie Guzman — congas, percussion	none
Late 1983–early/spring 1984	Tim Ellsworth — bass, co-lead vocals; Mark Olson — keyboards, co-lead vocals; Ray Monette — guitar, backing vocals; Gil Bridges — saxophone, flute, backing vocals; Tony Thomas — drums; Eddie Guzman — congas, percussion	none
Early/spring/mid 1984	Tim Ellsworth — bass, co-lead vocals; Mark Olson — keyboards, co-lead vocals; Ray Monette — guitar, backing vocals; Gil Bridges — saxophone, flute, backing vocals; Bobby Rock — drums; Eddie Guzman — congas, percussion	none
Spring/mid–September 1984	Tim Ellsworth — bass, co-lead vocals; Mark Olson — keyboards, co-lead vocals; Ray Monette — guitar, backing vocals; Gil Bridges — saxophone, flute, backing vocals; Bob Weaver — drums; Eddie Guzman — congas, percussion	none
September 1984–June 1985	Mark Olson — keyboards, lead vocals; Ray Monette — guitar, backing vocals; Andy Merrild — bass, backing vocals; Gil Bridges — saxophone, flute, backing vocals; Bob Weaver — drums; Eddie Guzman — congas, percussion	none
June–July/August 1985	Tim Ellsworth — bass, co-lead vocals; Mark Olson — keyboards, lead vocals; Ray Monette — guitar, backing vocals; Gil Bridges — saxophone, flute, backing vocals; Bob Weaver — drums; Eddie Guzman — congas, percussion	none
July/August–September 1985	Tim Ellsworth — bass, co-lead vocals; Mark Olson — keyboards, lead vocals; Ray Monette — guitar, backing vocals; Gil Bridges — saxophone, flute, backing vocals; Jerry LeBloch — drums; Eddie Guzman — congas, percussion	none
September 1985–1986	Mark Olson — keyboards, co-lead vocals; Gil Bridges — saxophone, flute, co-lead vocals; Ray Monette — guitar, backing vocals; Randy Burghdoff — bass, backing vocals; Jerry LeBloch — drums; Eddie Guzman — congas, percussion	none
1986–1987	Gil Bridges — saxophone, flute, lead vocals; Ray Monette — guitar, backing vocals; Randy Burghdoff — bass, backing vocals; Rick Warner — keyboards, backing vocals; Jerry LeBloch — drums; Eddie Guzman — congas, percussion	none
1987–1989	Wayne Baracks — guitar, co-lead vocals; Gil Bridges — saxophone, flute, co-lead vocals; Ray Monette — guitar, backing vocals; Randy Burghdoff — bass, backing vocals; Rick Warner — keyboards, backing vocals; Jerry LeBloch — drums; Eddie Guzman — congas, percussion	Made in Switzerland (1989)
1989–1993	Wayne Baracks — guitar, co-lead vocals; Gil Bridges — saxophone, flute, co-lead vocals; Ray Monette — guitar, backing vocals; Randy Burghdoff — bass, backing vocals; Rick Warner — keyboards, backing vocals; Jerry LeBloch — drums; Eddie Guzman — congas, percussion	Different World (1993)
1993–1994	Wayne Baracks — guitar, co-lead vocals; Gil Bridges — saxophone, flute, co-lead vocals; Ray Monette — guitar, backing vocals; Randy Burghdoff — bass, backing vocals; Rick Warner — keyboards, backing vocals; Floyd Stokes Jr. — drums, backing vocals	none
1994–1998	Gil Bridges — saxophone, flute, co-lead vocals; Floyd Stokes Jr. — drums, co-lead vocals; Ray Monette — guitar, backing vocals; Randy Burghdoff — bass, backing vocals; Rick Warner — keyboards, backing vocals	none
1998–2004	Gil Bridges — saxophone, flute, co-lead vocals; Floyd Stokes Jr. — drums, co-lead vocals; Ray Monette — guitar, backing vocals; Randy Burghdoff — bass, backing vocals; Mike Bruner — keyboards	none
Spring 2004–spring 2009	Gil Bridges — saxophone, flute, co-lead vocals; Ivan Greilick — guitar, co-lead vocals; Floyd Stokes Jr. — drums, co-lead vocals; Randy Burghdoff — bass, backing vocals; Mike Bruner — keyboards	Rare Earth (2005); A Brand New World (2008)
Spring 2009–early 2017	Gil Bridges — saxophone, flute, co-lead vocals; Floyd Stokes Jr. — drums, co-lead vocals; Ray Monette — guitar, backing vocals; Randy Burghdoff — bass, backing vocals; Mike Bruner — keyboards	Rare Earth Live (2009)
Early 2017–December 2021	Gil Bridges — saxophone, flute, co-lead vocals; Floyd Stokes Jr. — drums, co-lead vocals; Lew Patterson — guitar, backing vocals; Randy Burghdoff — bass, backing vocals; Mike Bruner — keyboards	none
Band inactive December 2021–March 2023
March 2023–fall 2025	Wayne Baraks — rhythm guitar, co-lead vocals; Rollo Rollins — saxophone, flute, co-lead vocals; Dan Medawar — lead guitar, backing vocals; Ron Cousineau — bass, backing vocals; Mike Bruner — keyboards; Keith Christian — drums, backing vocals; Ronnie Nelson — congas, percussion	none
Fall 2025–present	Wayne Baraks — rhythm guitar, co-lead vocals; Mocha Man — saxophone, flute, co-lead vocals; Dan Medawar — lead guitar, backing vocals; Ron Cousineau — bass, backing vocals; Mike Bruner — keyboards; Keith Christian — drums, backing vocals; Ronnie Nelson — congas, percussion	none to date
