= Greatest Hits and Rare Classics =

Compilation album by Rare Earth
- Released: February 26, 1991
- Length: 69:35
- Label: Motown
- Producer: George Soloman

Rare Earth chronology
| Tight and Hot (1982) | Greatest Hits and Rare Classics (1991) | Different World (1993) |

Greatest Hits and Rare Classics is a compilation album by American rock band Rare Earth released February 26, 1991, by Motown Records. Three of these songs were top ten hits with a total of eight charting on the Billboard Hot 100 when originally released.

== Critical reception ==
Professional ratings
Review scores
| Source | Rating |
|---|---|
| AllMusic | 4/5 stars |

Andrew Hamilton reviewing the album for AllMusic writes, "This collection is marred by abbreviated versions of "Get Ready," "I Know I'm Losing You," and others. For fans who didn't purchase individual albums, though, this is a good overall view of their work." He concludes with, "Lead singer Peter Hoorelbeke had a powerful voice that didn't take a backseat to anybody's. Imagine if they had cut "War," and why didn't they?"

== Track listing ==
| No. | Title | Writer(s) | Original album | Length |
|---|---|---|---|---|
| 1. | "Get Ready" (edit) | William "Smokey" Robinson | Get Ready (1969) | 2:45 |
| 2. | "Generation (Light up the Sky)" (edit) | Dino Fekaris; Nick Zesses; Beatrice Verdi | Generation (1969) | 2:43 |
| 3. | "(I Know) I'm Losing You" (edit) | Cornelius Grant; Eddie Holland; Norman Whitfield | Ecology (1970) | 3:34 |
| 4. | "When Joanie Smiles" | Tom Baird | Generation | 2:52 |
| 5. | "Born to Wander" | Tom Baird | Ecology | 3:17 |
| 6. | "Here Comes the Night" | Tom Baird | Motown single (R 5021) | 3:24 |
| 7. | "I Just Want to Celebrate" | Dino Fekaris; Nick Zesses | One World (1971) | 3:34 |
| 8. | "Love Shines Down" | Peter Hoorelbeke; Ray Monette | Motown single (R 5048F) | 3:35 |
| 9. | "Good Time Sally" | Tom Baird | Willie Remembers (1972) | 2:52 |
| 10. | "Hey Big Brother" | Dino Fekaris; Nick Zesses | Motown single (R 5038F) | 4:42 |
| 11. | "We're Gonna Have a Good Time" | Gil Bridges; Eddie Guzman; Peter Hoorelbeke; Ray Monette; Mark Olson | Willie Remembers | 3:22 |
| 12. | "Big John Is My Name" | Norman Whitfield | Ma (1973) | 4:14 |
| 13. | "Chained" | Frank Wilson | Motown single (R 5057F) | 2:47 |
| 14. | "Warm Ride" (edit) | Robin Gibb; Barry Gibb; Maurice Gibb | Band Together (1978) | 2:56 |
| 15. | "I Can Feel My Love Risin'" | Hiai King; Stephanie Shayne | Grand Slam (1978) | 2:53 |
| 16. | "Keepin' Me out of the Storm" (edit) | Paul Warren; Johnny Stevenson | Back to Earth (1975) | 4:16 |
| 17. | "It Makes You Happy (But It Ain't Gonna Last)" (edit) | Gabriel Katona; Paul Warren | Back to Earth | 3:10 |
| 18. | "Midnight Lady" (edit) | Norman Whitfield | Midnight Lady (1976) | 3:28 |
| 19. | "Hum Along and Dance" (edit) | Barrett Strong; Norman Whitfield | Ma | 4:01 |
| 20. | "Fresh from the Can" | Gil Bridges; Eddie Guzman; Peter Hoorelbeke; Ray Monette; Mark Olson; John Persh | Motown single (R 5057F) | 5:10 |
| Total length: | | | | 69:35 |

Track information and credits adapted from the album's liner notes.

== Musicians ==
- Rare Earth (Lineups are only of members during the period these tracks were recorded)
  - Gil Bridges – Saxophone, flute, background vocals (1960-current)
  - Rod Richards – Lead guitars, backing vocals (1960–1971)
  - Kenny James – Keyboards (1960–1971)
  - John Persh – Bass, trombone, background vocals (1960–1972)
  - Peter Hoorelbeke – Drums, lead vocals (1960–1974, 1976–1983)
  - Eddie Guzman – Percussion (1969–1993)
  - Ray Monette – Lead guitars, background vocals (1971–1976, 1977–2004, 2009-current)
  - Mike Urso – Bass, background vocals (1972–1974, 1976–1979, 1981–1983)
  - Mark Olson – Keyboards, backing vocals (1971–1974, 1977–1986)

== Production ==
- Producers
  - William "Smokey" Robinson (track 1)
  - Tom Baird (tracks 2, 4–7, 9, 11)
  - Rare Earth (tracks 7–11, 20)
  - Norman Whitfield (tracks 3, 12, 18–19)
  - Frank Wilson (Track 13)
  - John Ryan (tracks 14–15)
  - Stewart Levine (tracks 16–17)
- Compilation
  - Produced by George Soloman
  - Mastered by John Matousek
