= Grade 8 =

Grade 8 may refer to:

== Education ==
- Eighth grade, the eighth year of education in some countries
- Grade 8, the highest level of ABRSM#Graded music examsit is the first year of high school and first year of teenage.

== Science ==
- "Grade 8", a song by Ed Sheeran from his debut album, +
- Grade 8 (band), a former nu metal band from Los Angeles
  - Grade 8 (album), the band's self-titled album
