= Psychedelic Shack =

Studio album by The Temptations
- Released: March 6, 1970
- Recorded: November 1969 – February 1970
- Studio: Hitsville USA, Detroit
- Genre: Psychedelic soul; rock; funk
- Length: 36:35
- Label: Motown; GS 947
- Producer: Norman Whitfield

The Temptations chronology
On Broadway (with Diana Ross & the Supremes) (1969)	Psychedelic Shack (1970)	Greatest Hits, Vol. 2 (1970)

Singles from Psychedelic Shack
- 1. "Psychedelic Shack" Released: December 28, 1969; 2. "Hum Along and Dance" Released: September 15, 1970

Psychedelic Shack is the twelfth studio album by The Temptations for the Gordy (Motown) label released in 1970. Completely written by Norman Whitfield and Barrett Strong and produced by Whitfield, Psychedelic Shack almost completely abandoned the "Motown Sound" formula, instead delving fully into psychedelia. Along with the hit title track, the album also features the group's original version of "War", which became a major hit for Edwin Starr later in 1970.

== Background and recording ==
Psychedelic Shack was one of the last albums completed before the third incarnation of The Temptations (Dennis Edwards, Paul Williams, Eddie Kendricks, Melvin Franklin, and Otis Williams) broke apart. During the recording of the album, Paul Williams, already possessing a fragile condition because of sickle-cell disease, was now also fighting complications from five years of heavy alcoholism. Williams would frequently be unable to record or perform, and the Temptations had to resort to hiring Richard Street, an old friend of Otis Williams' and lead singer of minor Motown act The Monitors, as a stand-in for Paul Williams. At the same time, Eddie Kendricks' growing animosity towards Otis Williams and Melvin Franklin, and the group's general frustration over their lack of creative control and their treatment at the hands of Motown, resulted in an increased amount of infighting and set the stage for Kendricks' imminent departure in early 1971.

Like most Temptations albums from the group's "psychedelic period", producer Norman Whitfield held full creative control over Psychedelic Shack. The only freedom afforded the Temptations themselves for this album was the occasional opportunity for Kendricks to arrange the vocal harmonies. The album cover, a collage/illustration by Hermon Weems, places photographs of the Temptations in a depiction of a psychedelic shack: an establishment in urban neighborhoods where people could go to "enhance their minds" through art, music, and mind-altering drugs.

== Music and lyrics ==
The album begins with a knock at the door, and the sound of footsteps as a stranger wanders into an unfamiliar location. Finding a phonograph, the stranger drops the needle on the song that happened to be in the player—The Temptations' 1969 number-one hit "I Can't Get Next to You". The phonograph is heard playing "I Can't Get Next to You's" intro, reaching Dennis Edwards' interruption ("Hold on, everybody, hold it, hold on...listen!") before the album immediately segues into the first song, "Psychedelic Shack".

"Psychedelic Shack" was the only single from this album, and was a complete departure from previous Temptations recordings. Setting the tone for much of the album, "Psychedelic Shack's" vocals, guitar lines and drums shift back and forth across the stereo spectrum, and all five Temptations trade lead vocal duties at irregular intervals. Keyboardist Earl Van Dyke remembered "Psychedelic Shack" as one of his favorite recording sessions.

"You Make Your Own Heaven and Hell Right Here on Earth", later issued as the B-side of the 1971 hit "Just My Imagination (Running Away with Me)", features Edwards, Kendricks, Franklin, and Otis Williams informing the public that each individual person is responsible for their fate and that "the final decision [to do right or wrong] is still up to you". The song would be covered in 1971 by Whitfield-groomed Motown act The Undisputed Truth, whose version was released as the follow-up to their classic hit "Smiling Faces Sometimes", another song originally recorded by The Temptations. Whitfield stretched out and slowed down the song with The Truth, and their version was one of the group's several minor hits, making #72 and #24 on the Pop and R&B Charts, respectively.

"Hum Along and Dance", essentially wordless, is an example of Whitfield's growing emphasis on his production and instrumentation at the expense of The Temptations' vocals, an issue that caused a significant amount of friction between the group and their producer. While this version of "Hum Along and Dance" is the original recording of the composition, the song is better known in cover versions by Rare Earth (from Ma, 1973) and The Jackson 5 (from G.I.T.: Get It Together, also 1973). A crossfade joins "Hum Along and Dance" and the next track on the album, "Take a Stroll Thru Your Mind". "Take a Stroll Thru Your Mind" is a popular Temptations album track done in psychedelic/blues style, and is an overt eight-minute ode to marijuana usage. All five Temptations trade lead vocals across the two tracks.

Side B begins with "It's Summer", the only ballad on the album. Instead of love and relationship issues, "It's Summer" explores the positive elements that come with the onset of summer, with basso Melvin Franklin reciting the song's lyrics in spoken verse. The Temptations would later record a sung version of "It's Summer", and release it as a single for the Solid Rock album.

The next track, "War", is a serious anti-Vietnam protest sung by Paul Williams and Dennis Edwards. Motown received a significant number of requests to release "War" as a single; instead of risking the careers of the Temptations with such a politically charged song, the song was rerecorded by Edwin Starr before Motown allowed its release as a single.

The final two songs on the album are compositions more closely associated with Gladys Knight & the Pips, another Whitfield-produced act. "You Need Love Like I Do (Don't You)", led by Kendricks, was recorded simultaneously by both The Pips and the Temptations, with the Pips' version being issued as a single. "Friendship Train", the seven-minute album closer led by Edwards, is a cover of a 1969 Pips single. Tom Jones with Heather Small would record a cover of "You Need Love Like I Do (Don't You)" in 1999 (Reload).

== Critical reception ==
Professional ratings
Review scores
Source	Rating
AllMusic	4/5 stars
Christgau's Record Guide	B

Reviewing in Christgau's Record Guide: Rock Albums of the Seventies (1981), Robert Christgau wrote: "It's no accident that the best cut here begins 'Ain't no words to this song.' For all the hyperactivity of his horn charts, Norman Whitfield is a lot better equipped to get funky than to lead Motown's belated raid on 'relevance,' and many of these lyrics are dreadful. Several of them are quite all right, though, and 'War' does help mitigate the climactic wishy-wash of 'Friendship Train.' More to the point, the singing and playing really do fuse the production styles of Smokey and Sly, a major achievement. Why do white people challenge these songs so much quicker than they did 'Lucy in the Sky' or 'Happiness Is a Warm Gun'? Are friendship trains any dumber than bed-ins?"

== Track listing ==
All songs written by Norman Whitfield and Barrett Strong and produced by Whitfield.

=== Side one ===
1. "Psychedelic Shack" – 3:51 (lead singers: Dennis Edwards, Melvin Franklin, Eddie Kendricks, Paul Williams, Otis Williams)
2. "You Make Your Own Heaven and Hell Right Here on Earth" – 2:46 (lead singers: Dennis Edwards, Eddie Kendricks, Melvin Franklin, Otis Williams)
3. "Hum Along and Dance" – 3:53 (lead singers: Eddie Kendricks, Dennis Edwards, Melvin Franklin, Otis Williams)
4. "Take a Stroll Thru Your Mind" – 8:37 (lead singers: Eddie Kendricks, Dennis Edwards, Paul Williams, Melvin Franklin, Otis Williams)

=== Side two ===
1. "It's Summer" – 2:36 (spoken vocals: Melvin Franklin)
2. "War" – 3:11 (lead singers: Paul Williams, Dennis Edwards, Melvin Franklin)
3. "You Need Love Like I Do (Don't You)" – 3:58 (lead singer: Eddie Kendricks)
4. "Friendship Train" – 7:49 (lead singers: Dennis Edwards, Paul Williams, Eddie Kendricks, Melvin Franklin, Otis Williams)

== Personnel ==
The Temptations

- Dennis Edwards – vocals (tenor/baritone)
- Eddie Kendricks – vocals (first tenor/falsetto)
- Paul Williams – vocals (second tenor/baritone)
- Melvin Franklin – vocals (bass)
- Otis Williams – vocals (second tenor/baritone)

with:

- Norman Whitfield – producer, composer, lyricist
- Barrett Strong – composer, lyricist
- The Funk Brothers – instrumentation

== Charts ==
=== Weekly charts ===
Chart (1970)	Peak position
Canadian Albums (RPM)	43
US Billboard 200	9
US R&B Albums	1

=== Year-end charts ===
Chart (1970)	Peak position
US R&B Albums	6
US Billboard 200	50

=== Singles ===
Year	Single	Chart positions			
Year	Single	US	US R&B	US AC	UK
1970	"Psychedelic Shack" (b/w "That's the Way Love Is"); Gordy 7096	7	2	—	33
"—" denotes releases that did not chart

== See also ==
- List of number-one R&B albums of 1970 (U.S.)
