= Nigel Harrison =

English musician

- Born: Nigel Harrison; 24 April 1951 (age 75); Stockport, England
- Origin: Princes Risborough, Buckinghamshire, England
- Genre: Rock
- Occupations: Musician; songwriter
- Instrument: Bass

Nigel Harrison (born 24 April 1951) is an English musician. Harrison spent several years as the bassist of the American rock band Blondie during the 1970s and 1980s.

== Life and career ==
Harrison grew up in Princes Risborough, a small town in the Chiltern Hills. He was the bassist for the local band Farm, and later recorded and toured with Silverhead (fronted by Michael Des Barres) from 1972 to 1974.

On August 11, 1974 he played bass for "Murder of a Virgin", Iggy Pop's first solo performance. He was also an uncredited session bassist for The Runaways debut album when producer and manager Kim Fowley refused to have Runaways bassist Jackie Fox perform on the record. He was recruited to Blondie from Nite City (former The Doors' keyboardist Ray Manzarek's short-lived band) in 1977, after the band recorded their second album Plastic Letters without a regular bass player, and stayed until the band split after Tracks Across America Tour '82.

During his time with Blondie, Nigel Harrison contributed as a songwriter to every album he played on and also co-wrote several hit singles with Debbie Harry, such as "One Way or Another", "Union City Blue" and the band's last single with their most successful line-up, "War Child", released in 1982.

From 1982 to 1984 he was a member of the band Chequered Past, which also included two of his former bandmates: Des Barres, from Silverhead, Steve Jones from The Sex Pistols and Clem Burke, from Blondie. They released an eponymous album in 1984. Harrison was also music supervisor/producer for the soundtrack to the 1988 comedy Tapeheads.

When Blondie started to talk about re-forming in 1997, Harrison was initially asked to rejoin the group. He recorded demo tracks with the band for the album No Exit (1999), but was dropped from the band before the record was finished. He and another excluded former member, Frank Infante, brought a lawsuit over the dispute, but were unsuccessful.

Harrison was an A&R Executive at Interscope Records and also did A&R work for Capitol Records.

Harrison later became the bass player for The Grabs, whose album Sex, Fashion And Money was released in November 2005.

In March 2006, Blondie, following an introductory speech by Shirley Manson of Garbage, were inducted into the Rock and Roll Hall of Fame. Seven members were invited to the ceremony, which led to an on-stage spat between the extant group and Infante, who asked during the live broadcast of the ceremony that he and Harrison be allowed to perform with the group, a request refused by Debbie Harry, who stated that the band's current line-up had already prepared and rehearsed for the performance.

Harrison continues playing with various acts, including The Rua on the 2015 album The Essence.

== Discography ==
With Silverhead

- Silverhead (1972)
- 16 and Savaged (1973)

With The Runaways

- The Runaways (1976)

With Nite City

- Nite City (1977)
- Golden Days Diamond Nights (1978)

With Blondie

- Parallel Lines (1978)
- Eat to the Beat (1979)
- Autoamerican (1980)
- The Hunter (1982)

With Chequered Past

- Chequered Past (1984)

With The Rua

- Essence (2015)
- The Rua (2019)
