= Golden Days Diamond Nights =

Golden Days, Diamond Nights

Studio album by Nite City
- Released: 1978
- Genre: Rock
- Label: 20th Century
- Producer: Ray Manzarek

Nite City chronology
Nite City (1977)	Golden Days, Diamond Nights (1978)

Golden Days Diamond Nights is the second and final studio album by the American rock band Nite City, a band that was formed by former Doors' member and keyboardist Ray Manzarek. As with the band's self titled debut and live album, entitled Starwood Club, Los Angeles. 02/23/1977, Golden Days Diamond Nights sold poorly and the group disbanded shortly after the album's release.

The album's title is taken from lyrics to "Get Up and Dance", a song from the Doors' Full Circle, and "Perfumed Garden", a song from Manzarek's solo album The Whole Thing Started with Rock & Roll Now It's Out of Control.

== Track listing ==
No.	Title	Writer(s)	Length
1.	"Riding on the Wings of Love"	Jimmy Hunter, Paul Warren, Ray Manzarek	3:38
2.	"The Dreamer"	Paul Warren, Ray Manzarek	6:21
3.	"Holy Music"	Champion, Paul Warren	5:04
4.	"Ain't Got the Time"	Nigel Harrison, Ray Manzarek	3:13
5.	"Die High"	Paul Warren	4:49
6.	"Blinded by Love"	Noah James, Paul Warren	4:39
7.	"Barcelona"	Nigel Harrison	3:29
8.	"America"	Ray Manzarek	8:33
Total length:			38:09

== Personnel ==
Nite City

- Ray Manzarek - keyboards, vocals
- Paul Warren - guitar, lead vocals
- Nigel Harrison - bass
- Jimmy Hunter - drums, backing vocals

Technical

- Leonard Kovner - engineer
