= I Just Want to Celebrate =

Single by Rare Earth

from the album One World
- B-side: "The Seed"
- Released: June 21, 1971
- Genre: Blue-eyed soul, funk
- Length: 2:52 (single edit); 3:35 (album version)
- Label: Rare Earth
- Songwriters: Dino Fekaris; Nick Zesses
- Producers: Rare Earth; Tom Baird

Rare Earth singles chronology
"Born to Wander" (1970)	"I Just Want to Celebrate" (1971)	"Hey Big Brother" (1971)

"I Just Want to Celebrate" is a song recorded by American rock band Rare Earth. It was the lead single on their 1971 album One World and was the band's fifth single overall.

== Personnel ==
- Peter Rivera – lead vocals and backing vocals, drums
- Ray Monette – electric guitar and backing vocals
- Mark Olson – organ and backing vocals
- John Persh – bass and backing vocals
- Gil Bridges – tambourine and backing vocals
- Ed Guzman – congas

== Appearances ==
"I Just Want to Celebrate" has been included on numerous 1970s compilation albums.

== Reception ==
The song was among the most popular hits of the 1970s. Joe Viglione at Allmusic noted that without its inclusion on One World, "the album would've been an instant bargain-bin candidate." It reached #7 on the pop charts and was Rare Earth's final top 10 single, as well as peaking at #30 on the Best Selling Soul Singles chart. It was the opening song on their live album, Rare Earth in Concert, released later that year; and, in later years was included on various live and best-of compilations.

== Charts ==
Chart (1971/72)	Peak position
Australia (Kent Music Report)	83
Belgium (Ultratop 50 Wallonia)	42
Canada Top Singles (RPM)	10
Netherlands (Single Top 100)	13
US Billboard Hot 100	7
US Best Selling Soul Singles (Billboard)	30

== Cover versions and samples ==
- Vonda Van Dyke for her 1971 album, Day by Day.
- Kim Boyce - a pop/dance rendition - for her 1988 album, Time and Again.
- Nu metal band Grade 8 recorded a cover version entitled "Celebrate" as the final track for their 2003 self-titled debut.
- On October 27-28, 2007, heavy metal band Metallica opened with "I Just Want to Celebrate" during their acoustic performances at Neil Young's Bridge School Benefit show. This performance came as a shock to fans and was the first of numerous uncharacteristic covers in Metallica shows.
- Compton, California rappers N.W.A. sampled "I Just Want to Celebrate" in the song "Real Niggaz Don't Die" from their 1991 album Niggaz4Life.
- Rapper Foxy Brown sampled "Real Niggaz Don't Die" in the song "BWA" from her 1999 album Chyna Doll.
- In late 2007, three separate hip hop albums sampled the hit 1970s single: a rendition entitled "We Celebrate" from Ghostface Killah's The Big Doe Rehab; the opening track "Sirens" from Little Brother's Getback; UGK's "Trill Niggas Don't Die" from Underground Kingz.
- Rap rock band Hed PE took the chorus tune for the chorus of their song "Bartender" from their 2000 album Broke.
- Glenn Hughes on his 2001 studio album Building the Machine.
- In 2014, Austrian dance music duo Klangkarussell used lyrics from the song in their track "Celebrate" from their 2014 album Netzwerk. Later the same year, lyrics from "I Just Want to Celebrate" were also incorporated in American rapper Pitbull's song, which was also entitled "Celebrate". His track was featured in the soundtrack of the 2014 animated family film Penguins of Madagascar, and later his eighth studio album Globalization (2014).
- Marshall Crenshaw for "Even More Superhits of the Seventies", a 2015 CD premium compiled by WFMU DJ Michael Shelley.

== Popular culture ==
- "I Just Want to Celebrate" has been used in national advertising campaigns by Ford Motor Company, AT&T, and Nicoderm.
- It appeared in the last episode of the TV show Six Feet Under (2001–2005)
- This song was used in the promo for the Nickelodeon's "Superstuffed Nicktoons Weekend" in Thanksgiving 2007.
- The song was featured in the Malcolm in the Middle episode The Bots and the Bees.
- The song was also featured prominently in the films Three Kings (1999), A Knight's Tale (2001), The Man (2005), Land of the Lost (2009), The Expendables 2 (2012) and Bullet Train (2022), in the trailer for the 2008 film Tropic Thunder, and in the end credits music in episode 24 ("One Day in the Valley") of the television series, Entourage.
- In 2012, it was used in advertisements for Nicoderm CQ brand smoking cessation patches.
- In 2013, it appeared in the commercial for the video game Plants vs. Zombies 2: It's About Time.
