= Psychedelic Shack (song) =

- German release picture sleeve

Single by the Temptations

from the album Psychedelic Shack
- B-side: "That's the Way Love Is"
- Released: December 28, 1969
- Recorded: November 21 and December 2, 1969
- Studio: Hitsville USA (Studio A)
- Genre: Funk; psychedelic soul
- Length: 3:56
- Label: Gordy – G 7096
- Songwriter(s): Norman Whitfield; Barrett Strong
- Producer(s): Norman Whitfield

The Temptations singles chronology
"I Second That Emotion" (1969)	"Psychedelic Shack" (1969)	"Ball of Confusion (That's What the World Is Today)" (1970)

"Psychedelic Shack" is a 1969 single for the Motown label performed by the Temptations and produced by Norman Whitfield. It became a hit single in 1970.

This single features the Temptations and Whitfield's continuing their submergence into psychedelia, with multilead vocals, hard rock guitars, synthesizer sound effects, multitracked drums, and stereo-shifting vocals giving the record a distinct sound. The song's title and lyrics refer to a type of hippie nightclub popular in the late 1960s.

"Psychedelic Shack"'s LP mix begins with the sounds of a person entering a psychedelic shack and dropping the needle on a record, "I Can't Get Next to You" which was the Temptations single that immediately preceded this one. The use of the recording of "I Can't Get Next to You" from its 45 RPM single makes "Psychedelic Shack" one of the first songs to use sampling, a technique that would become a staple of hip hop music in the coming decade.

The song ends, after its fourth verse, with the Funk Brothers backing band going into a jam session as the song fades out. Keyboardist Earl Van Dyke remembers "Psychedelic Shack" as one of his favorite recording sessions. The full extended version of the song, with the complete jam session, went unreleased until a new six-minute mix of the record was done in 2003 for the Psychedelic Soul compilation set.

"Psychedelic Shack" was the title track from the Psychedelic Shack album, released in March 1970. The song reached #7 on the US Billboard Hot 100, #4 Cash Box, and #2 on the US R&B charts.

== Personnel ==
- Lead and background vocals by Dennis Edwards, Eddie Kendricks, Paul Williams, Melvin Franklin, and Otis Williams
- Instrumentation by the Funk Brothers
