= Grade 8 (album) =

Studio album by Grade 8
- Released: February 11, 2003
- Recorded: 2002
- Studio: Rumbo Recorders, Canoga Park, California
- Genre: Nu metal, rap metal
- Length: 42:54
- Label: Lava, Atlantic
- Producer: Ross Hogarth

Grade 8 chronology
Grade 8 (2003)	Resurrection (2004)

Singles from Grade 8
- 1. "Brick by Brick" Released: May 2003; 2. "Celebrate" Released: June 23, 2003

Grade 8 is the debut album by American nu metal/rap metal music group Grade 8. It was released on February 11, 2003 via Lava Records. The album failed to gain commercial success and resulted in Grade 8 being dropped from Lava.

== Musical style ==
Grade 8 features a pummeling rap metal style with thunderous, staccato riffing in B tuning and harshly delivered rapping. Songs contain chugging double bass as well as moody, atmospheric sections. Comparable to Machine Head's Burning Red, the album's style is largely characteristic of nu metal which had faded from mainstream popularity by 2003. Frontman Dustin Tooker explained, "It's just an honest expression of how we feel. We wrote a record we're huge fans of, just being music fans."

Lyrically, Grade 8 contains aggressive prose of confrontation and perseverance. This is reflected in the liner notes photography which portrays various elements of a boxing ring in a dark and gritty fashion.

A cover of Rare Earth's 1971 hit "I Just Want to Celebrate" was also featured on Grade 8 as interpreted in their heavy, metallic fashion. It includes an additional rapped verse, similar to 3rd Strike's rendition of "Paranoid" released almost a year prior.

== Touring and promotion ==
A music video was produced for the opening track, "Brick by Brick". It was posted online in May 2003 and found minimal airplay on Fuse TV. "Celebrate," a heavy cover of the Rare Earth hit, was released to radio on June 23 as a follow-up single. However, several tracks off the album garnered circulation on Muzak's satellite radio station, Power Rock. The song "Let 'Em Know" was also featured in the video game True Crime: Streets of LA.

The band joined Spineshank for a club tour schedule in the spring before taking a Second Stage slot on Ozzfest 2003. Suspicion rose, however, when Grade 8 and Depswa abruptly left the tour in mid August. Early reports cited an apparent loss of tour support funds which was not commented on by the bands' publicists. It was also noted that neither Grade 8 nor Depswa had managed to sell 10,000 copies of the latest albums upon leaving Ozzfest, suggesting that their record labels, unsatisfied with their commercial success, had discontinued their tour support. Both bands joined Chimaira for a few club shows in late August.

Shortly after this, Grade 8 was dropped from Lava after bassist Tim Tooker and drummer Michael Blankenship were fired by frontman Dustin Tooker.

"Smoke n' Mirrors" appeared in the season 5 finale of The Sopranos.

== Reception ==
=== Critical response ===
Professional ratings
Review scores
Source	Rating
AllMusic	2/5 stars

The album was not received with particular enthusiasm. Robert L. Doerschuk of AllMusic noted "Get It Out" an "AMG Track Pick" and stated, "There's no doubt that grade 8 can pummel through a set of neo-metal material and, most likely, tear it up on-stage; the only question is why that may be all it takes to make it in a style whose rules are as rigid and unforgiving as those of even the most conservative genres."

=== Commercial success ===
Grade 8 did not manage to chart nor did its singles. When the band abruptly ended its Ozzfest schedule in mid-August, Grade 8 had sold just under 10,000 copies which allegedly prompted Lava to pull tour funding.

== Track listing ==
All tracks are written by Ryan Tooker and Dustin Tooker except where noted.

No.	Title	Writer(s)	Length
1.	"Brick by Brick"		3:14
2.	"Headcase"		3:50
3.	"One Wish"		4:11
4.	"Adrenachrome"		3:36
5.	"Get It Out"		3:21
6.	"Empire Falls"		4:40
7.	"Let 'Em Know"		3:35
8.	"Chances"		3:59
9.	"Deal with It"		2:44
10.	"Frozen"		3:18
11.	"Smoke n' Mirrors"		2:47
12.	"Celebrate"	Dino Fekaris, Nicholas Zesses	3:27

== Personnel ==
Grade 8

- Ryan Tooker – vocals
- Dustin Tooker – guitar
- Guy Couturier – bass
- Scott Carneghi – drums

Production

- Produced and engineered by Ross Hogarth
- Programming by Justin Walden
- Mixed by Toby Wright at Record Plant Studios, Los Angeles
