= The Whole Thing Started with Rock & Roll Now It's Out of Control =

The Whole Thing Started with Rock and Roll Now It's Out of Control

Studio album by Ray Manzarek
- Released: 1974
- Recorded: 1974
- Studios: Sound Labs, Hollywood, California
- Genre: Rock
- Length: 40:44
- Label: Mercury
- Producer: Bob Brown

Ray Manzarek chronology
The Golden Scarab (1974)	The Whole Thing Started with Rock and Roll Now It's Out of Control (1974)	Carmina Burana (1983)

The Whole Thing Started with Rock and Roll Now It's Out of Control is the second studio album by American singer and keyboardist Ray Manzarek. Released on the Mercury label in 1974, the album did not succeed and failed in sales. It was also Manzarek's last album before forming the short-lived rock band Nite City in 1977.

== Track listing ==
All tracks composed by Ray Manzarek unless noted otherwise.

1. "The Whole Thing Started with Rock and Roll Now It's Out of Control" (Manzarek, Danny Sugerman, Dick Wagner) – 2:39
2. "The Gambler" (Manzarek, Danny Sugerman) – 5:23
3. "Whirling Dervish" (Manzarek, Paul Davis) – 5:20
4. "Begin the World Again" – 6:42
5. "I Wake Up Screaming" (Manzarek, Danny Sugerman, Jim Morrison) – 3:36
6. "Art Deco Fandango" – 2:03
7. "Bicentennial Blues (Love It or Leave It)" – 7:57
8. "Perfumed Garden" – 5:54

Poem on "I Wake Up Screaming" from The New Creatures by Jim Morrison

== Personnel ==
- Ray Manzarek – celesta, clavinet, Fender Rhodes, organ, piano, Wurlitzer, synthesizer, vocals
- Joe Walsh – guitar
- Michael Fennelly – guitar
- Mark Pines – guitar
- George Segal – banjo
- Gary Mallaber – drums, percussion, vibraphone
- Paul Davis – percussion
- Steve Forman – percussion
- Patti Smith – "poetess" on "I Wake up Screaming"; recites Jim Morrison's "Ensenada" from The New Creatures
- Flo & Eddie – background vocals on "The Whole Thing Started with Rock and Roll Now It's Out of Control", "Bicentennial Blues" and "Perfumed Garden"
- John Klemmer – saxophone on "Whirling Dervish"
- Mike Melvoin – horn arrangements

Technical

- Rudy Hill – engineer
- Desmond Strobel, John David Moore – art direction
- James Fortune, Keith Rodabaugh – photography
- Danny Sugerman – personal management

Special thanks: "Guitar Center, the Screamer, Linda Smith, Iggy Pop, Mandi Newall."
