= The Classic Rock All-Stars =

- Genres: Rock; pop; psychedelic; soul
- Website: https://theclassicrockallstars.com/

The Classic Rock All-Stars is a supergroup composed of hit-making artists in the 1960s and 1970s. The band has performed a variety of classic hits live often at outdoor festivals, since forming in 1992. The hit song "Get Ready" typically kicked off the live show showcasing Pete Rivera's (also known as: Peter Hoorelbeke) lead vocals while drumming.

Spencer Davis of the Spencer Davis Group was originally 2nd guitarist in the band, but left to pursue other interests. Dennis Noda, formerly of Cannibal and the Headhunters and the original bassist for the Classic Rock All-Stars, died in May 2009.

The current line up as of 2019 has Albert Bouchard manning the drum kit, along with new additions from the bands War, Oingo Boingo, and The Moody Blues. The 1994 line up released one self titled album the same year. After years of international touring the band has a loyal fan-base some of whom refer's to the band simply as CRA.

Members have included:

- Pete Rivera: Original drummer and lead singer for Rare Earth
- Jerry Corbetta: Keyboardist for Sugarloaf and Frankie Valli
- Mike Pinera: Lead singer of Blues Image and guitarist for Iron Butterfly and Alice Cooper
- Mark Farner: guitarist for Grand Funk Railroad
- Larry Prentiss, bassist for Johnny Rivers
- Goldy McJohn, keyboardist for Steppenwolf
- Albert Bouchard, drummer for the Blue Öyster Cult
- Prescott Niles, bassist for The Knack
