= The Golden Scarab =

Studio album by Ray Manzarek
- Released: March 28, 1974
- Recorded: 1973
- Studios: Sunset Sound, Los Angeles, California, United States
- Genres: Blues rock; psychedelic rock; jazz fusion; rhythm and blues; electronic rock
- Length: 45:17
- Label: Mercury
- Producers: Bruce Botnick, Bob Brown

Ray Manzarek chronology
The Golden Scarab (1974)	The Whole Thing Started with Rock & Roll Now It's Out of Control (1974)

The Golden Scarab is the debut studio album by former Doors member Ray Manzarek as a solo artist. It was recorded in 1973 and released in 1974 on the Mercury label, one year after the Doors breakup (at that time a trio formed of the surviving members of the band: Manzarek himself, Robby Krieger, and John Densmore).

== Reception ==
Professional ratings
Review scores
Source	Rating
AllMusic	3/5 stars
Uncut	0.5/5 stars
The Encyclopedia of Popular Music	2/5 stars

Joe Viglione of AllMusic gave The Golden Scarab a rating of three out of five stars. He considered it to be the "best embodiment of the Doors by one of the three surviving members", concluding:

It is amazing that such a fine work as The Golden Scarab escaped the masses, and shameful that classic hits stations don't add this to their incessant repertoire. Had Jim Morrison lived, this is the path the music of the Doors should have taken. Smooth and demanding of repeated spins.

In contrast, Uncut magazine wrote a scathing review, ridiculing, "It sucks ... Even Jim at his dumbest, stinkiest drunk would have pissed himself laughing."

== Track listing ==
All tracks composed by Ray Manzarek except where indicated:

Side one
No.	Title	Length
1.	"He Can't Come Today"	4:40
2.	"Solar Boat"	5:58
3.	"Downbound Train" (Chuck Berry)	5:31
4.	"The Golden Scarab"	6:42

Side two
No.	Title	Length
1.	"The Purpose of Existence Is?"	6:38
2.	"The Moorish Idol"	5:38
3.	"Choose Up and Choose Off"	4:43
4.	"Oh Thou Precious Nectar Filled Form" ("A Little Fart")	4:57

=== CD bonus tracks ===
1. "Whirling Dervish" (Manzarek, Paul Davis) *
2. "I Wake Up Screaming" (Manzarek, Danny Sugerman) *
3. "Bicentennial Blues (Love It or Leave It)" *
- Bonus tracks taken from Manzarek's 1974 LP The Whole Thing Started with Rock & Roll Now It's Out of Control.

== Personnel ==
- Ray Manzarek – lead vocals, keyboards, piano, organ, synthesizer, kalimba
- Larry Carlton – guitar
- Tony Williams – drums
- Oscar Brashear – trumpet
- Mayuto Correa – wood block, bongos, congas
- Milt Holland – pandeiro, cabasa, quica, African cowbell
- Jerry Scheff – bass guitar
- Ernie Watts – tenor saxophone
- George Bohanon – trombone
- Steve Forman – tuned cowbells, whistles, guiro, tuned wood blocks
- Patti Smith – vocals on "I Wake Up Screaming"
