= Nite City =

American rock band formed by Ray Manzarek

- Also known as: Ray Manzarek's Nite City
- Origin: Los Angeles, California, United States
- Genres: Rock
- Years active: 1977–1978
- Labels: 20th Century
- Past members: Nigel Harrison; Jimmy Hunter; Noah James; Ray Manzarek; Paul Warren

Nite City (Also known as Ray Manzarek's Nite City) was an American rock band formed in Los Angeles, California, in 1977 by former Doors member Ray Manzarek. The band consisted of lead singer Noah James, bassist Nigel Harrison who later achieved greater success as a member of Blondie, guitarist Paul Warren, drummer Jimmy Hunter and keyboardist Ray Manzarek. The group recorded and released two studio albums in 1977 and 1978 and one live album in 1977 on the 20th Century Record label. The band's music sold poorly and the group failed to acquire any sales or following. Soon after the release of their second studio album, Golden Days Diamond Nights, which was released only in West Germany, Nite City disbanded.

== Band members ==
- Ray Manzarek – keyboards & vocals
- Jimmy Hunter – drums & vocals
- Noah James – lead vocals (debut album only)
- Nigel Harrison – bass
- Paul Warren – guitar & vocals

== Discography ==
- Nite City (1977)
- Starwood Club, Los Angeles. 02/23/1977 (1977)
- Golden Days Diamond Nights (1978)
