= Rare Earth in Concert =

Live album by Rare Earth
- Released: December 1971
- Recorded: Live at Jacksonville, Jacksonville Coliseum, Miami Florida Marine Stadium, Ithaca, New York Cornell University. and at The Pharmacy. Side four, track 2 recorded at Motown Studios.
- Length: 73:43
- Label: Rare Earth

Rare Earth chronology
One World (1971)	Rare Earth in Concert (1971)	Willie Remembers (1972)

Professional ratings
Review scores
Source	Rating
AllMusic	4.5/5 stars

Rare Earth in Concert is a live album by rock band Rare Earth, which was released as a double-LP in 1971. It contains a 23:33 version of their signature hit "Get Ready", as well as a new studio song: "Nice To Be With You". It was issued a RIAA gold record award.

== Track listing ==
=== Side one ===
1. "I Just Want to Celebrate" (Nick Zesses, Dino Fekaris)– 4:40
2. "Hey, Big Brother" (Nick Zesses, Dino Fekaris)– 7:26
3. "Born to Wander" (Tom Baird)– 4:24

=== Side two ===
1. "Get Ready" (William "Smokey" Robinson)– 23:33
- The unedited performance ran close to an hour

=== Side three ===
1. "What'd I Say" (Ray Charles)– 6:31
2. "Thoughts" (Gilbert Bridges, Peter Hoorelbeke, Edward Guzman, John Persh, Mark Olson, Raymond Monette)— 10:53

=== Side four ===
1. "(I Know) I'm Losing You" (Cornelius Grant, Edward Holland Jr., Norman Whitfield)— 14:09
2. "Nice to Be with You" (Mark Olson, Raymond Monette, Peter Hoorelbeke)— 2:15

== Charts ==
Chart (1972)	Peak position
Australia (Kent Music Report)	26
US Top LP's (Billboard)	29

== Personnel ==
Rare Earth

- Gil Bridges – woodwinds, backing vocals, percussion, flute
- Ray Monette – guitars, backing vocals
- Mark Olson – keyboards, backing vocals
- John Persh – bass guitar, backing vocals
- Pete Rivera (Hoorelbeke)– drums, lead vocals, percussion
- Ed Guzman – conga, percussion

== Credits ==
- Recording engineers: Cal Harris, Nate Jennings, John Lewis, Ken Sands, Bob Olhsson, Orson Lewis, Criteria Recording Company
- Technical engineers: Don Boehrat, Gurdev Sandhu, Michael Grace, Don Fostie
- Mastering engineer: Russ Terrana
- Graphic Supervision: Tom Schlesinger
- Art direction: Curtis McNair
- Rare Earth photos: Joel Brodsky
- Personal manager: Ron Strasner
- Special thanks to: Harry Balk, Ralph Terrana
- Recorded live at Jacksonville Coliseum, Jacksonville, Florida; Marine Stadium, Miami, Florida; Cornell University, Ithaca, New York; and At The Pharmacy
- "Nice to Be with You" recorded at Motown Studios
