= One World (Rare Earth album) =

Studio album by Rare Earth
- Released: June 2, 1971
- Recorded: April–May 1971
- Length: 33:47
- Label: Rare Earth
- Producers: Rare Earth and Tom Baird

Rare Earth chronology
Ecology (1970)	One World (1971)	Rare Earth in Concert (1971)

Singles from One World
- 1. "I Just Want to Celebrate" Released: 21 June 1971; 2. "Someone to Love" Released: August 1971; 3. "Hey Big Brother" Released: 4 November 1971

Professional ratings
Review scores
Source	Rating
AllMusic	2.0/5 stars

One World is the fourth studio album by rock band Rare Earth, released in June 1971. The single "I Just Want to Celebrate" became a Top 10 Gold certified hit, and the album became the group's third and final gold album.

On June 9, 2015, the album was released on the CD format for the first time, as a remastered, limited collector's edition digipak with the original gatefold cover.

== Track listing ==
=== Side one ===
1. "What'd I Say" (Ray Charles) – 7:15
2. "If I Die" (Pete Rivera) – 3:32
3. "The Seed" (Rivera) – 3:34
4. "I Just Want to Celebrate" (Dino Fekaris, Nick Zesses) – 3:35

=== Side two ===
1. "Someone to Love" (Gil Bridges) – 3:48
2. "Any Man Can Be a Fool" (John Persh) – 3:36
3. "The Road" (Tom Baird) – 3:35
4. "Under God's Light" (Eddie Guzman, Ray Monette, Mark Olson) – 4:52

== Charts ==
Chart (1971/72)	Peak position
Australia (Kent Music Report)	30
Canada Top Albums/CDs (RPM)	30
US Billboard 200	28

== Personnel ==
Rare Earth

- Pete Rivera (Hoorelbeke)– lead vocals and backing vocals, drums
- Gil Bridges – woodwinds, tambourine, flute and backing vocals
- Ray Monette – guitars and backing vocals
- Mark Olson – organ, piano and backing vocals
- John Persh – bass and backing vocals
- Ed Guzman – percussions
