= Peter Rivera (musician) =

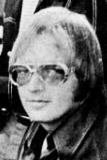

Background information
- Also known as: Peter Rivera
- Born: Peter Hoorelbeke; June 16, 1944 (age 82); Detroit, Michigan, US
- Instruments: Drums, vocals
- Years active: 1960–present
- Formerly of: Rare Earth, The Classic Rock All-Stars
- Spouse: Dabar Hoorelbeke

Peter Hoorelbeke, (born June 16, 1944) known professionally as Peter Rivera, is an American drummer and singer. He was an original member of Rare Earth.

== Early life ==
Rivera was born Peter Hoorelbeke in Detroit. His father, uncles and cousin all worked in a factory and his mother was a housewife. When he was nine years old, a door-to-door salesman sold the family a package of thirty drum lessons. Rivera only took three lessons, as his family could not afford the other lessons, however he continued to play the drums, practising to the likes of Glenn Miller, Sammy Kaye, and Stan Kenton. As a teenager, he bought a new set of drums through his job as a paper boy and as an adult worked in a factory.

== Career ==
In the early 1960s, he auditioned for The Sunliners but did not get the part, however one year later they brought him into the group. A few years later the band was performing daily and Rivera was doubling as lead singer. The Sunliners changed their name to Rare Earth in 1968 and became the first act that was signed to one of Motown's new sub-labels dedicated to just white acts; after the band joked that the nameless label should be also called "Rare Earth", the label agreed.

From 1968 to 1983, Rivera was the lead singer and drummer for Rare Earth, whose biggest hits were covers of other Motown and soul records including "Get Ready" (US #4, CAN #1), "(I Know) I'm Losing You" (US #7), and "What'd I Say" (US #61), but are best known for their original song, "I Just Want to Celebrate" (US #7). Rivera left in 1983 after arguments with saxophonist Gil Bridges.

Rivera tours as a solo artist and in 1992, formed The Classic Rock All-Stars with a core lineup of Jerry Corbetta of Sugarloaf, Mike Pinera of Blues Image and Dennis Noda of Cannibal & the Headhunters. His first solo album, It Is What It Is, was released in 2014. In 2016, Rivera's vocals were used in the Kanye West song "Fade". From 2019 to 2021, Rivera hosted his own podcast in which he spoke about his life and career. He performed two concerts in 2023 with his own orchestra, R&B Celebrate Symphony.

== Personal life ==
Rivera married Dabar in 1970, and remained married until her death in 2013. They have three children. He lived in Los Angeles, and then in Coeur d'Alene, Idaho, where he raised his children, but moved with his wife back to Los Angeles when the children left home in 2003, before moving to Spokane, Washington in 2009, where he still lives today. His children now live in Atlanta, Texas and North Dakota.
