= Willie Remembers =

Studio album by Rare Earth
- Released: October 1972
- Length: 39:02
- Label: Rare Earth
- Producer: Joe Porter, Rare Earth, Tom Baird

Rare Earth chronology
Rare Earth in Concert (1971)	Willie Remembers (1972)	Ma (1973)

Professional ratings
Review scores
Source	Rating
Allmusic	2/5 stars

Willie Remembers is the fifth album of the group Rare Earth. This is the band's first attempt at producing their own original work for a whole album, instead of utilizing some cover versions and a hired producer. As a result, it did not fare as well as their past albums. "Good Time Sally" was a #67 hit.

== Track listing ==
=== Side one ===
1. "Good Time Sally" (Tom Baird) – 2:52
2. "Every Now & Then We Get to Go on Down to Miami" (Dino Fekaris, Nick Zesses) – 3:09
3. "Think of the Children" (Ray Monette, Mark Olson, Pete Rivera) – 5:47
4. "Gotta Get Myself Back Home" (Gil Bridges, Eddie Guzman, Monette, Olson, Rivera) – 3:03
5. "Come With Your Lady" (Bridges, Guzman, Monette, Olson, Rivera) – 5:50

=== Side two ===
1. "Would You Like to Come Along" (Bridges, Guzman, Monette, Olson, Rivera) – 2:50
2. "We're Gonna Have a Good Time" (Baird, Bridges, Guzman, Monette, Olson, Rivera) – 3:21
3. "I Couldn't Believe What Happened Last Night" (Bridges, Guzman, Monette, Olson, Rivera) – 12:10

== Personnel ==
Rare Earth

- Gil Bridges – woodwinds, backing vocals, percussion
- Ray Monette – guitars
- Mark Olson – keyboards, backing vocals
- Mike Urso – bass, backing vocals
- Pete Hoorelbeke – drums, lead vocals, percussion
- Ed Guzman – congas, percussion

== Charts ==
Chart (1973)	Peak position
US Top LP's & Tape (Billboard)	90
