= Paul Warren (guitarist) =

American guitarist

- Born: December 22, 1953 (age 72); Garden City, Michigan, U.S.
- Occupation: Guitarist
- Years active: 1970s–present
- Website: thepaulwarrenproject.com

Paul Warren (born December 22, 1953) is an American rock and blues guitarist, known for being a member of a few rock bands as well as the former touring guitarist for Tina Turner and English rock singer Rod Stewart. He also played with American rock singer Richard Marx. Warren was also a member of Ray Manzarek's Nite City from 1977 until their disbanding in 1978. In 1984, he toured with The Ventures, serving as their bassist while Bob Bogle took a tour break. In 2013, Paul retired from Rod Stewart's band to work on production and play closer to home in Nashville. He joined Brian Howe, former lead singer with Bad Company and was a member of his band until Howe's untimely passing.

Paul Warren is now retired and is enjoying spending time with his family.

== Biography ==
Warren was born in Garden City, Michigan, to Pearl Elwanda Gribble and Walter Wayne Warren. His family relocated to Plymouth, Michigan, when Paul was a child. He started to play guitar at twelve years old, and at the age of seventeen, he was discovered by Norman Whitfield of Motown Records. Soon after, he became a regular session player for the famed Hitsville studios. The first recording he played on was "Papa Was a Rollin' Stone" by The Temptations. The song went to No. 1 on the Pop and Rhythm & Blues charts in 1972. It won a Grammy Award in 1983.

Warren appeared with the band Pacific Gas & Electric in 1972 on the German television show Beat Club. He also claims to have performed the famous guitar solo on Funkadelic's song "Get Off Your Ass and Jam".

After playing on numerous albums, he became a working studio musician, and when Motown moved offices to California in 1973, they paid for him to move so he could continue as a session guitarist. He joined the rock band Rare Earth and is credited as being co-writer on three songs from the Back to Earth album.

After quitting Motown in 1975, Ray Manzarek of The Doors employed Warren as lead guitarist for his new band Nite City. By their second album, Warren had also become the lead singer and wrote a number of songs on the Album Golden Days Diamond Nights. The band had separated by the release of their second album. In the late 1970s, he formed his own band, Paul Warren & Explorer, and was a regular on the Sunset Strip scene playing almost every weekend at the Roxy, Whisky a Go Go, the Starwood, Madame Wong's in Chinatown, and other clubs. He was signed by RSO Records and released his failed first solo album, One of the Kids, in 1980. Later that year, RSO Records folded and Warren was unemployed. He became a guitar player for hire from 1981 until 1987, working for such greats as The Ventures, Tina Turner, and Prism. He is also credited with producing a number of records in this era.

In 1987, he joined Richard Marx at the beginning of his career soon after the release of Marx's multi-platinum debut album. Warren was Marx's music director for seven years, leaving in 1994. The day after quitting Marx's band, Warren went on the road as lead guitarist for British singer Joe Cocker, whose "Have a Little Faith Tour" lasted 18 months. In 1996, Warren was employed by Italian singer Eros Ramazzotti for eleven years before quitting in 2005. Circa 1999, Warren was employed between tours with Ramazzotti as guitarist for Rod Stewart. In late 2010, Warren released his first solo album in over a decade titled Round Trip with his own band, The Paul Warren Project.

In an interview in 2010, Warren talked about working on recording sessions with local artists, producers, and recording studios.

== Discography ==
- Rare Earth - Back to Earth (1975)
- Nite City - Nite City (1977)
- Nite City - Golden Days Diamond Night (1978)
- Paul Warren & Explorer - One of the Kids (1980)
- Prism - Beat Street (1983)
- The Paul Warren Project - Round Trip (2011)
- Cactus - Tightrope (2021)
