= Ma (Rare Earth album) =

Studio album by Rare Earth
- Released: April 1973
- Genre: Funk rock, soul, psychedelic rock
- Length: 37:26
- Label: Motown
- Producer: Norman Whitfield

Rare Earth chronology
Willie Remembers (1972)	Ma (1973)	Back To Earth (1975)

Professional ratings
Review scores
Source	Rating
AllMusic	4.0/5 stars

Ma is the sixth studio album by rock band Rare Earth, released in April 1973. It marks another change, as none of the tracks were composed or written by the band. All composing and production were handled by producer Norman Whitfield, with some assistance from Barrett Strong, a longtime collaborator of Whitfield.

== Track listing ==
All tracks composed by Norman Whitfield; except where indicated.

=== Side one ===
1. "Ma" – 17:21

=== Side two ===
1. "Big John Is My Name" – 4:06
2. "Smiling Faces Sometimes" (Norman Whitfield, Barrett Strong) - 6:20
3. "Hum Along and Dance" (Norman Whitfield, Barrett Strong) - 5:15
4. "Come With Me" - 4:30

== Personnel ==
Rare Earth

- Gil Bridges – flute, saxophone, vocals
- Peter Hoorelbeke – drums, percussion, lead vocals
- Ray Monette – lead guitar, vocals
- Mark Olson – keyboards, vocals
- Mike Urso – bass guitar, vocals
- Edward Guzman – congas, timbales
