= Back to Earth (Rare Earth album) =

Studio album by Rare Earth
- Released: 1975
- Length: 34:50
- Label: Rare Earth
- Producer: Stewart Levine

Rare Earth chronology
Ma (1973)	Back to Earth (1975)	Midnight Lady (1976)

Professional ratings
Review scores
Source	Rating
Allmusic	2.0/5 stars

Back to Earth is the eighth studio album by rock band Rare Earth, which was released in 1975. Jerry LaCroix replaced departed lead singer Peter Hoorelbeke and Reggie McBride replaced departed bassist Michael Urso. Hoorelbeke, Urso and producer Tom Baird went on to form the group HUB and release two albums Hub (1975) and Cheata (1976) on Capitol Records.

== Track listing ==
1. "It Makes You Happy (But It Ain't Gonna Last Too Long)" (Gabriel Katona, Paul Warren) – 4:08
2. "Wallking Schtick" (Gabriel Katona) – 4:14
3. "Keeping Me Out of the Storm" (Johnny Stevenson, Paul Warren) – 5:22
4. "Delta Melody" (Doug Duffey) – 4:59
5. "Happy Song" (Doug Duffey) – 4:54
6. "Let Me Be Your Sunshine" (Gabriel Katona, Paul Warren) – 2:51
7. "Boogie With Me Children" (Jerry LaCroix) – 3:26
8. "City Life" (Dennis Provisor) – 4:56

== Personnel ==
Rare Earth

- Jerry LaCroix – lead vocals, tenor saxophone, flute
- Gil Bridges – flute, alto saxophone, backing vocals
- Ray Monette – guitar
- Paul Warren – guitar, backing vocals
- Gabriel Katona – keyboards, backing vocals
- Reggie McBride – bass, backing vocals
- Barry "Frosty" Smith – drums, percussion
- Eddie Guzman – congas, percussion

Technical

- Rik Pekkonen – engineer
