= Ecology (Rare Earth album) =

Studio album by Rare Earth
- Released: June 1970
- Recorded: November 1969, January, February & May 1970
- Length: 38:45
- Label: Rare Earth
- Producers: Norman Whitfield, Tom Baird

Rare Earth chronology
| Get Ready (1969) | Ecology (1970) | One World (1971) |

Ecology is the third studio album by American rock band Rare Earth. It was released in 1970 on Rare Earth Records.

== Production ==
The album contains a cover of "Eleanor Rigby" by The Beatles. "Long Time Leavin'" received an amount of attention on the FM radio format. This succeeded in giving the band further credibility. And they earned their second "Top 10 chart" with a cover of The Temptations' "(I Know) I'm Losing You".

Ever since 1967, the Summer of Love, songs like "Born to Wander" and "Long Time Leavin'", were descriptive of the nomadic teen and college youth culture sweeping across the United States and Europe. This gave the album contemporary gravitas. Ecology was possibly Rare Earth's most consistent album, showing the band at the height of their artistry and credibility.

== Release ==
In 1971, Rare Earth became the first recording group to sue suspected pirates, naming the Lear Jet Corp., Muntz Stereo City, Pan American Distributing Co., Universal Tape Outlet, Stereo City and Harmony House in a suit filed by the band and Rare Earth Records which charged the Lear Jet Corp. with supplying blank tapes to Pan American Distributing Co. which were used to pirate material that appeared on Get Ready and Ecology, the suit contending that in addition to the contractual violation, the pirated tapes were detrimental to the band's professionalism, as the pirated tapes were of a much lower sound quality than the band's official releases.

== Reception ==
Professional ratings
Review scores
| Source | Rating |
|---|---|
| Allmusic | 3.0/5 stars |

== Track listing ==
=== Side one ===
1. "Born To Wander" (Tom Baird) – 3:20
2. "Long Time Leavin'" (Baird) – 4:42
3. "(I Know) I'm Losing You" (Cornelius Grant, Eddie Holland, Norman Whitfield) – 10:50

=== Side two ===
1. "Satisfaction Guaranteed" (Baird) – 4:34
2. "Nice Place To Visit" (John Persh) – 3:57
3. "No. 1 Man" (Baird) – 4:48
4. "Eleanor Rigby" (John Lennon, Paul McCartney) – 6:34

== Personnel ==
Rare Earth

- Gil Bridges – flute, saxophone, tambourine, vocals
- Eddie Guzman – conga
- Kenny James – organ
- John Persh – bass, trombone, vocals
- Rod Richards – guitar, vocals
- Pete Rivera (Hoorelbeke)– drums, vocals
