= Hum Along and Dance =

1970 song performed by The Temptations

Single by The Temptations

from the album Psychedelic Shack
- A-side: "Ungena Za Ulimwengu (Unite the World)"
- Released: September 15, 1970
- Genre: Psychedelic soul
- Label: Motown
- Songwriters: Norman Whitfield, Barrett Strong
- Producer: Norman Whitfield

The Temptations singles chronology
"Ball of Confusion (That's What the World Is Today)" (1970)	"Ungena Za Ulimwengu (Unite the World)" / "Hum Along and Dance" (1970)	"Just My Imagination (Running Away with Me)" (1971)

"Hum Along and Dance"

Song by Rare Earth

from the album Ma
- Released: April 1973
- Genre: Rock
- Label: Motown
- Songwriters: Norman Whitfield and Barrett Strong
- Producer: Norman Whitfield

"Hum Along and Dance"

Song by The Jackson 5

from the album Get It Together
- Released: 1973
- Recorded: May 1973
- Genre: Funk
- Length: 8:38 (Album Version) 14:54 (Uncut Version)
- Label: Motown
- Songwriters: Norman Whitfield and Barrett Strong
- Producer: Hal Davis

"Hum Along and Dance" is a soul song written for the Motown label by Norman Whitfield and Barrett Strong. Originally recorded by the Temptations, the song was later covered by Motown acts Rare Earth and the Jackson 5. The song is essentially an instrumental piece and a vehicle for scatting and improvisational vocals, since, as the chorus (the song's only actual lyric) states, "ain't no words to this song/you just dance and hum along". The versions by the Temptations and by Rare Earth were produced by Whitfield.

== Temptations version ==
The original version of "Hum Along and Dance" was recorded by the Temptations in early 1970 as an album track for the Psychedelic Shack album. The track, one of the Temptations' many psychedelic soul recordings, features Eddie Kendricks, Melvin Franklin, and Dennis Edwards taking turns in delivering the song's chorus and scatting over the instrumental track. The Funk Brothers were the instrumentalists for this version of "Hum Along and Dance", and Whitfield uses a number of echo effects and stereo-panning effects on their tracks during the song. Towards the final few bars of the record, Otis Williams delivers a heavily echoed chant: "Come on man/take a drag/don't be afraid/it ain't gonna hurt you", an overt reference to marijuana use. In fact, on the Psychedelic Shack album, "Hum Along and Dance" leads directly into "Take a Stroll Through Your Mind", an eight-minute ode to marijuana use.

The track was released as the B-side of their 1970 single "Ungena Za Ulimwengu (Unite the World)".

== Rare Earth version ==
Rock band Rare Earth's version was released as an album track for their 1973 album Ma. Their version features instrumentation from the various members of the band, with harder guitar chords, and a prominent organ line. Lead singer Pete Rivera offers an excuse for the lack of lyrics ("you see, we didn't have time to write none") and urges to the listener to "get it!" (that is, dance).

== Jackson 5 version ==
The Jackson 5 version of "Hum Along and Dance" appeared as the closing track for side A of their 1973 album G.I.T.: Get It Together. The lead vocals are primarily handled by Jackie Jackson and Tito Jackson, with Michael Jackson and Marlon Jackson appearing towards the end. Although the Jackson brothers are heard yelling out "Play it, Tito" and "Play it, Jermaine", the actual instrumentalists on the track were Los Angeles studio players. Motown did not allow the Jacksons to play their own instruments or write and produce their own material, and the lack of creative freedom would cause the group to leave for CBS Records within two years of making this recording.

This version of "Hum Along and Dance" is stylistically similar to the Rare Earth version, and features nearly the same arrangement with more of an electric funk sound added to the mix. A bewildered Marlon Jackson is heard asking, upon hearing the song's chorus, "ain't no words? What you mean?" His bandmate and brother Tito Jackson replies, as he has been doing throughout the song, by reiterating Gil Bridges' reasoning: "we ain't have time to write none". Jackie Jackson is heard answering as well telling Michael Jackson what to do. This version was sampled by the Bomb Squad for Public Enemy's 1989 track "Prophets Of Rage". An alternate "uncut" longer version of the song appears as a bonus track on the 2004 twofer CD of "Joyful Jukebox Music/Boogie".

The song was remixed by David Morales for the 2009 release The Remix Suite.

== Personnel ==
=== Temptations version ===
- Lead vocals by Eddie Kendricks, Melvin Franklin, Dennis Edwards, and Otis Williams
- Background vocals by the Temptations: Dennis Edwards, Eddie Kendricks, Paul Williams, Melvin Franklin, and Otis Williams
- Instrumentation by the Funk Brothers

=== Jackson 5 version ===
- Lead and background vocals by the Jackson 5: Jackie Jackson, Tito Jackson, Jermaine Jackson, Marlon Jackson & Michael Jackson
- Instrumentation by various Los Angeles studio musicians

=== Rare Earth version ===
- Lead vocals by Pete Rivera
- Background vocals by Gil Bridges and Rod Richards
- Instrumentation by Rare Earth: Gil Bridges (saxophone), Pete Rivera (drums), Mike Urso (bass guitar), Ray Monette (guitar), and Mark Olsen (keyboards), Ed Guzman (percussions)
