= Grade 8 (band) =

American nu metal band

- From left to right: Foster, Ryan, Hagblom, Dustin

Background information
- Origin: New Jersey, U.S.
- Genres: Nu metal, rap metal
- Years active: 1996–2008
- Labels: Lava, Atlantic, Sound Barrier
- Past members: Ryan Tooker; Dustin Tooker; Aaron Zilch; Brian 'Stitch' Foster; Josh Garcia; Scott Carneghi; Michael Blankenship; Tim Tooker; Guy Couturier; Wade Hagblom
- Website: grade8music.com (dead link)

Grade 8 (stylized as grade 8) was an American nu metal band from New Jersey.

== History ==
=== Formation and Grade 8 (1996–2003) ===
Grade 8's origins can be traced back to the East Coast, specifically the state of New Jersey. Guitarist Dustin Tooker played in a local band and, needing a last-minute replacement for the band's vocalist at a show, recruited his brother Ryan. This new lineup proved to be successful and was well received by the local music community, giving birth to Grade 8. The brothers continued to play shows in the New Jersey area over the next two years, with a constantly changing rhythm section.

The name of the band stemmed from two meanings: the first referring to the grade 8 metal that is used for bolts that Dustin Tooker would use when working as a mechanic. It also so happened to be that Ryan Tooker was in the eighth grade at high school when he first joined the lineup.

In search of a record deal and more stable lineup, the Tooker brothers relocated to Los Angeles, where they moved in with their father, Tim. In support of his two sons, he allowed them to set up a rehearsal space in his living room and even lent his bass playing skills to the band lineup in order to help provide some stability. It was during this writing and rehearsal period that the lineup finally found a permanent drummer in Scott Carneghi; a Los Angeles resident who originated from Chicago.

While living in Los Angeles, both Ryan and Dustin Tooker worked jobs in the music industry, allowing them to make vital contacts before eventually signing a management deal. This deal allowed the band to record demos that could be shopped around to record labels. After refining their sound, working on new material and recording demos for a period of time, Grade 8 eventually attracted the attention of several labels before settling on a joint venture deal with Lava and Atlantic Records in 2002. The band immediately set to work on recording their debut album, recording at Rumbo Recorders in Canoga Park, California.

Two weeks before the mixing of the album was complete, the band replaced bassist Tim Tooker with Guy Couturier. Another Los Angeles resident, originally from Switzerland. Despite not participating in the recording, Couturier was listed as the bassist in the album's liner notes and given equal authority when listening to the final mixes.

February 11, 2003, saw the release of Grade 8's debut, self-titled album. The band toured with Mudvayne, Murderdolls, and Anthrax. Sometime during these tours, drummer Scott Carneghi was replaced with Michael Blankenship. In May 2003, the song Brick by Brick was released as a single, with an accompanying music video. This brought the band further success, as the single reached #1 on the college rock charts and several tracks from their debut album made appearances in other media, including the TV series The Sopranos and the video game True Crime: Streets of LA. A final tour with Spineshank took place before the band found themselves playing on the 2003 Ozzfest tour, performing on the second stage. However, this would prove to be the beginnings of troubling times for the fledgling band.

While performing on the Ozzfest tour, Grade 8 ran into business issues, resorting to hitching rides on the tour buses of other bands and using borrowed equipment. At first, the band were due to drop off the tour after a date in Scranton, Pennsylvania. However, a much-needed injection of funds from a sponsorship deal with SoBe energy drink allowed the band to continue.

On August 13, it was reported that Grade 8 had abruptly left the tour, along with another second stage band, Depswa. The report hinted at an apparent loss of tour support funds, which was not commented on by Grade 8 or their publicist. It was also noted that neither Grade 8 or Depswa had managed to sell 10,000 copies of their latest albums at the time of their leaving Ozzfest. Grade 8 specifically at the time had sold 9,840 copies of their debut album. It was later suggested that their respective record labels had pulled tour support due to being unsatisfied with the lack of commercial success of their latest albums.

=== Resurrection and breakup (2004–2008) ===
Both Ryan and Dustin Tooker took the opportunity to regroup and signed on with a new manager, who relocated the brothers to Las Vegas, Nevada. In the fall of 2003, with the assistance of their new manager as well as Paige Haley, the band recruited a new bassist in Brian 'Stitch' Foster, from Los Angeles. After auditioning several drummers, and firing a short-lived permanent one, Wade Hagblom, the Tooker brothers called Josh Garcia, whom they'd met the previous year on a radio show in Modesto, California. Garcia jumped at the chance to join the band, being a fan himself.

With a new lineup in place, the band moved into a secluded house in the Las Vegas desert, with help from their management. A shed outside the house was converted into a rehearsal studio. The space was less than ideal, as the band had to build their own bunks to sleep in, and found their rehearsal shed to be constantly infested with Black Widow spiders and Scorpions. However, the band pressed on and began writing new material for their second album, recording demos for their record label. During this writing process, both Ryan and Dustin Tooker decided that they wanted to incorporate more electronics into their sound. They subsequently brought in Aaron Zilch, who'd just left American Head Charge, to handle electronics and keyboard duties. After several successful rehearsals, Zilch agreed to join the band on a permanent basis and added his own flair to the band's existing demos.

However, in another blow of bad luck for the band, the demos that the band had recorded were met with a lukewarm reception from Lava Records, who were taking less of an interest in the band since their A&R representative had left the company. Lava Records was also in the process of a major restructure, with the president of Lava Records joining Atlantic in 2004, and Lava being absorbed by Atlantic the following year. During the tumultuous period for the record company, Grade 8 were dropped along with many other acts. Nevertheless, the band pressed on and continued to write and demo new material while deciding what to do next.

After several months, bassist Stitch secured several radio festival appearances for the band in California, with help from Ivan Moody. Faced with the opportunity to generate an income from these shows, the band quickly booked themselves a week in a recording studio to record their second album. With only a limited amount of available time in the studio, the band were forced to sacrifice production quality in order to record what they needed to do. The resultant album sounded considerably poorer in quality compared to their debut, with only a few guitar and vocal overdubs managed and Zilch's parts recorded on his own computer, outside of the studio. Due to a lack of funds, the band were only able to hire Toby Wright to mix two tracks from the 13 on the album, as opposed to all tracks as he did on their debut.

On August 10, 2004, Grade 8 released their second album, Resurrection, via Sound Barrier Records. The album was poorly received by fans and critics alike, with most of the negative criticism aimed at the poor production quality, likening it to a polished demo rather than a finished product.

After performing a series of shows in California, the band attempted to continue, with Yamaha (who endorsed guitarist Dustin Tooker) reporting in summer 2005 that the band were writing new material and recording demos for their third album. However, reports quickly died down before the band fell into a period of inactivity. Three unreleased demos from these recording sessions are still available to hear on the band's Reverbnation page.

On April 1, 2007, Aaron Zilch posted a statement on the Amazon listing of Resurrection to further explain what was happening in the band at the time of recording Resurrection:

"So here's the deal: Several months after parting ways with American Head Charge (fall 2003) I got a call from a friend in the industry who knew I was looking for a new gig. He told me there was a band that had a deal with Lava/Atlantic and did Ozzfest and some other descent tours but their old manager was a chump and their rhythm section deserted them. They were looking for a new bassist and drummer and wanted to get an electronics/keyboard guy. The new manager was putting the band up in Vegas and keeping them fed while they worked on new material to demo for Lava. I got the first record and heard potential so I flew out to Vegas. Everyone seemed really cool and our jam sessions went well so I decided to stay. We recorded a bunch of songs for Lava but the label was in turmoil and our A&R guy left the company. Not surprisingly, we were dropped along with many many other acts. We stayed in Vegas trying to figure out the next move.

Several months later our bassist Stitch hooked us up with some radio festival gigs in CA through his old bandmate Ivan from Motograter. The next thing I know we're in the studio trying to turn the demo recordings into a record in the space of a week. Our manager had hooked up a great deal with a major box chain to put the record into stores in any region where we were active via radio or touring. He wanted to get things kicked off in CA right away, so we struggled to at least get some guitar and vocal overdubs tracked, and give it a more focused mixing, in the short amount of time available. I had no chance to fix or add anything (all my parts had been tracked out of my Mac's headphone jack, they were demos).

and btw all the electronics were done by myself (though there are some guitar parts you might think are electronics or vice versa). Toby Wright just did alternate mixes for a couple of the tracks not "remixed" in the NIN, Prodigy sense of the word. Though he did turn my parts up and killed the guitars in the verses of "Fighting Me""

On August 4, 2008, after a long period of silence, Dustin and Ryan Tooker finally posted a blog on the Grade 8 Myspace page, signaling the end of the band, stating: "I think we are just ready to do other things, and we wanted to leave Grade 8 the way it was, not change the sound." The blog went on to state that they had started a new project called The Kill Generation. However, no further announcements were made.

=== Post-Grade 8 (2009–present) ===
On October 5, 2016, underground rapper N.O.MADD independently released the single Roll Da Dice, featuring Ryan Tooker as a guest rapper.

On March 4, 2018, a Grade 8 Instagram page became active with the announcement that new music is being worked on. However, the page hasn't been active since February 25, 2021.

On August 26, 2021, Dustin Tooker (now playing guitar in the band Nefariant) wrote an opinion piece for Loudwire. From the perspective of his own experience serving in the US Army as a sniper in Afghanistan, he provided his views on the war in Afghanistan.

On December 1, 2025, a TikTok account under the name 'swampwatermusic' posts a video featuring Dustin Tooker as a member.

Vocalist Ryan Tooker currently resides and works in Las Vegas.

== Members ==
=== Final line-up ===
- Ryan Tooker – vocals (1996–2008)
- Dustin Tooker – guitar (1996–2008)
- Josh Garcia – drums (2004–2008)
- Brian 'Stitch' Foster – bass (2003–2008)
- Aaron Zilch – electronics (2004–2008)

=== Former members ===
- Tim Tooker – bass (2001–2003)
- Guy Couturier – bass (2003)
- Scott Carneghi – drums (2001–2003)
- Michael 'M.B' Blankenship – drums (2003)
- Wade Hagblom – drums (2003, 2004)

== Discography ==
Release date	Title	Label
2000	Feelin’ Fine/Hot Minute (promo)	DeVeto Presents Productions
February 11, 2003	Grade 8	Lava/Atlantic
August 10, 2004	Resurrection	Sound Barrier

=== Feelin’ Fine/Hot Minute ===
1. Feelin’ Fine (Mosh Version)
2. Hot Minute (Real Rock Hip-Hop Version)
3. Hot Minute (Funky Instrumental)

=== Resurrection ===
1. Intro
2. Resurrection
3. Fighting Me
4. Everybody
5. Oxi Rotten (on CD, back of case), Oxyrotten (Liner notes)
6. Fallen Angel
7. Ignore
8. Agitated
9. Waiting
10. Serving Serpents
11. So Strong
12. Demons
13. I Don’t Need

=== T.O.N.E. (Scrapped Third Album) ===
1. Crazy
2. MKDS
3. We All Come in Peace
4. Numb
5. Strugglin'
