= Ray Manzarek =

American keyboardist (1939–2013)

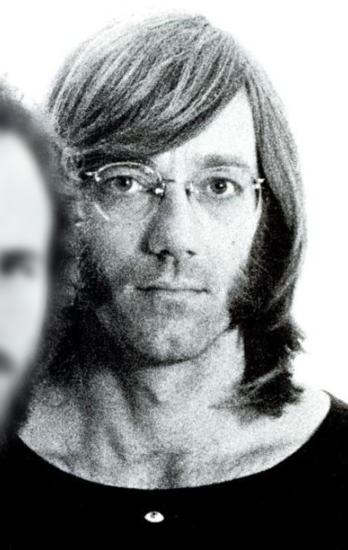
- Manzarek in 1971
- Born: Raymond Daniel Manczarek Jr. February 12, 1939; Chicago, Illinois, U.S.
- Died: May 20, 2013 (aged 74); Rosenheim, Germany
- Occupations: Musician; songwriter
- Years active: 1959–2013
- Spouse: Dorothy Aiko Fujikawa (m. 1967)
- Children: 1 (Pablo Manzarek)
- Musical career
- Genres: Psychedelic rock; jazz fusion
- Instruments: Keyboards; vocals
- Labels: Elektra; A&M
- Website: https://raymanzarek.com/

Raymond Daniel Manzarek Jr. (/mænˈzɛɪrək/ man-ZAYR-ik; né Manczarek; February 12, 1939 – May 20, 2013) was an American keyboardist, vocalist, and music producer. He is best known as a member of the rock band the Doors, co-founding the group in 1965 with fellow UCLA Film School graduate Jim Morrison. Manzarek is credited for his innovative playing and abilities on organ-style keyboard instruments.

Manzarek was inducted into the Rock and Roll Hall of Fame in 1993 as a Doors member. He was a co-founding member of Nite City from 1977 to 1978 and of Manzarek–Krieger from 2001 until he died in 2013. USA Today described him as "one of the best keyboardists ever".

== Biography ==
=== Early life ===
Raymond Daniel Manczarek Jr. was born and raised on the South Side of Chicago, Illinois. He was born to parents of Polish descent, Helena Kolenda (1918–2012) and Raymond Manczarek Sr. (1914–1986). His grandparents emigrated from Poland in the 1890s.

Upon graduating from St. Rita of Cascia High School in 1956, Manzarek matriculated at DePaul University, where he played piano in his fraternity's jazz band (the Beta Pi Mu Combo), participated in intramural football, served as treasurer of the Speech Club, and organized a charity concert with Sonny Rollins and Dave Brubeck. He graduated from the University's College of Commerce with a degree in economics in 1960.

In late 1961, Manzarek briefly enrolled at the University of California, Los Angeles School of Law. Unable to acclimate to the curriculum, he transferred to the Department of Motion Pictures, Television and Radio as a graduate student before dropping out after breaking up with a girlfriend. Although he attempted to enlist in the Army Signal Corps as a camera operator, he was instead assigned to the highly selective Army Security Agency as a prospective intelligence analyst.

=== The Doors ===
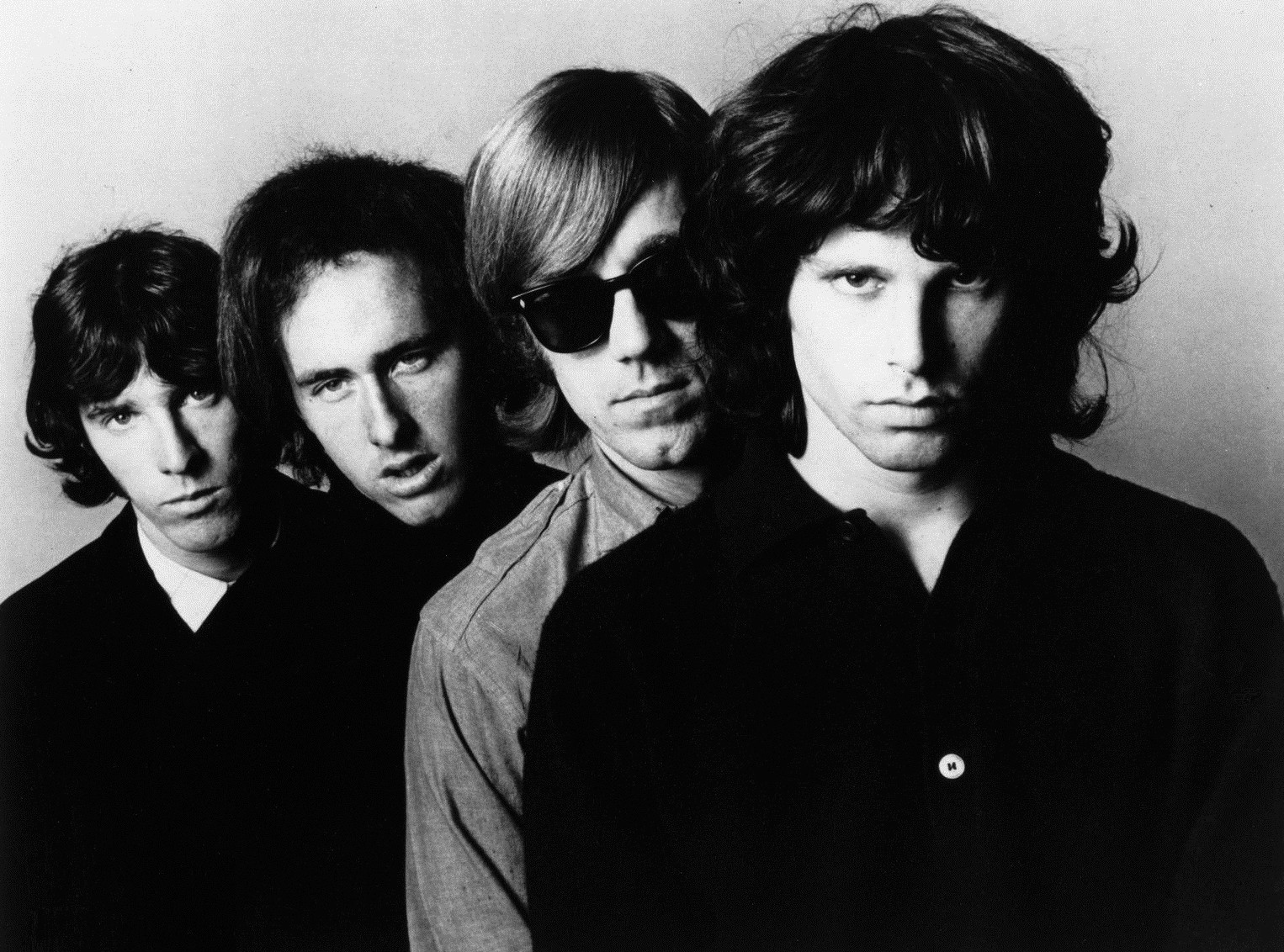
From left to right, Densmore, Krieger, Manzarek and Morrison in a publicity photo from 1966

Manzarek re-enrolled in UCLA's graduate film program in 1962, receiving a Master of Fine Arts degree in cinematography in 1965. During this period, he met future wife Dorothy Fujikawa and undergraduate film student Jim Morrison. At the time, Manzarek was in a band called Rick & the Ravens with his brothers Rick and Jim. Forty days after finishing film school, thinking they had gone their separate ways, Manzarek and Morrison met by chance on Venice Beach in California. Morrison said he had written some songs, and Manzarek expressed an interest in hearing them, whereupon Morrison sang rough versions of "Moonlight Drive", "My Eyes Have Seen You," and "Summer's Almost Gone". During this time, Manzarek also met teenage guitarist Robby Krieger and drummer John Densmore at a Transcendental Meditation lecture and recruited them for the incipient band. Densmore said, "There wouldn't be any Doors without Maharishi."

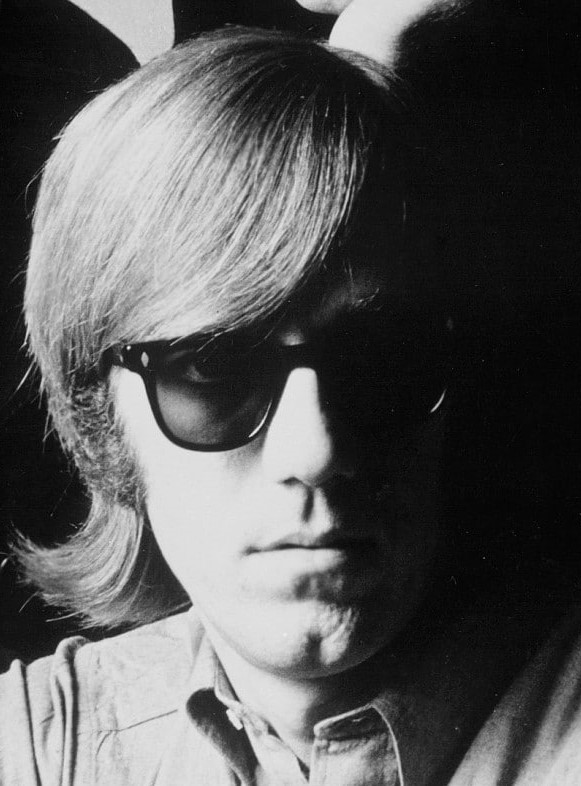
Manzarek in 1966

In January 1966, The Doors became the house band at the London Fog on the Sunset Strip. According to Manzarek, "Nobody ever came in the place ... an occasional sailor or two on leave, a few drunks. All in all it was a very depressing experience, but it gave us time to really get the music together". When The Doors were fired from the London Fog, they were hired to be the house band at the Whisky a Go Go. The Doors' first recording contract was with Columbia Records. After a few months of inactivity, they learned they were on Columbia's drop list. At that point, they asked to be released from their contract. Following a few months of live gigs, Jac Holzman "rediscovered" The Doors and signed them to Elektra Records.

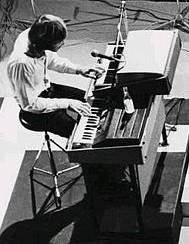
Manzarek performing live on Danish television, using his signature technique: a Rhodes Piano Bass with his left hand, while performing the main melodies with his right on an organ.

The Doors lacked a bass guitarist (except during recording sessions), so for live performances, Manzarek played the bass parts on a Fender Rhodes piano keyboard bass. His signature sound was that of the Vox Continental combo organ, an instrument used by many other psychedelic rock bands of the era. He also used a Gibson G-101 Kalamazoo combo organ (which looks like a Farfisa) for the band's later albums.

During the Morrison era, Manzarek was the group's regular backing vocalist. He occasionally sang lead, as exemplified by recordings of Muddy Waters's "Close to You" (released on 1970's Absolutely Live) and "You Need Meat (Don't Go No Further)" (recorded during the L.A. Woman sessions and initially released as the B-side of "Love Her Madly"). He went on to share lead vocals with Krieger on the albums (Other Voices and Full Circle) released after Morrison's death.

=== Later career and influence ===
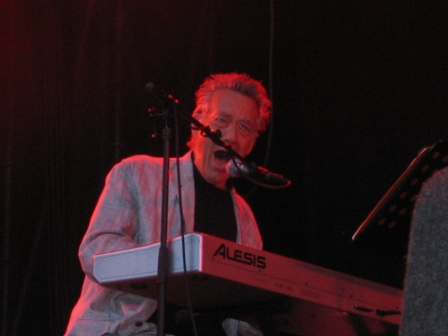
Manzarek in March 2006, performing in the Netherlands

After recording two solo albums on Mercury Records to a muted reception in 1974, Manzarek played in several groups, most notably Nite City. He recorded a rock adaptation of Carl Orff's Carmina Burana (1983; co-produced by Philip Glass), briefly played with Iggy Pop, sat in on one track on the eponymous 1987 album Echo & the Bunnymen, backed San Francisco poet Michael McClure's poetry readings and worked on improvisational compositions with poet Michael C. Ford. He also worked extensively with Hearts of Fire screenwriter and former SRC frontman Scott Richardson on a series of spoken word and blues recordings titled "Tornado Souvenirs". Manzarek produced the first four albums of the seminal punk band X, also contributing occasionally on keyboards. Two of those have also been included on Rolling Stone's 500 Greatest Albums of All Time.

His memoir, Light My Fire: My Life with the Doors, was published in 1998. The Poet in Exile (2001) is a novel exploring the urban legend that Jim Morrison may have faked his death. Manzarek's second novel, Snake Moon, released in April 2006, is a Civil War ghost story. In 2000, a collaboration poetry album titled Freshly Dug was released with British singer, poet, actor, and pioneer punk rocker Darryl Read. Read had previously worked with Manzarek on the Beat Existentialist album in 1994, and their last poetical and musical collaboration was in 2007 with the album Bleeding Paradise. Also in 2000, he co-wrote and directed the film Love Her Madly, which was credited to a story idea by Morrison. The film was shown at the closing night of the 2004 Santa Cruz Film Festival, but otherwise received limited distribution and critical review.

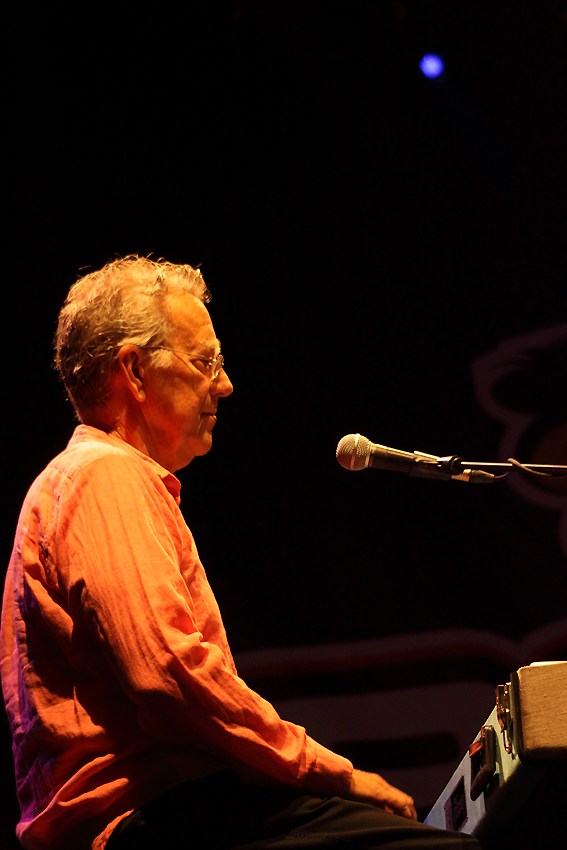
Manzarek at the Bospop festival, Weert 2010, the Netherlands

In 2006, he collaborated with composer and trumpeter Bal. The album that resulted, Atonal Head, explores the realm of electronica. The two musicians integrated jazz, rock, ethnic, and classical music into their computer-based creations. On August 4, 2007, Manzarek hosted a program on BBC Radio 2 about the 40th anniversary of the recording of "Light My Fire" and the group's musical and spiritual influences.

In April 2009, Manzarek and Robby Krieger appeared as special guests for Daryl Hall's monthly concert webcast Live From Daryl's House. They performed several Doors tunes ("People Are Strange", "The Crystal Ship", "Roadhouse Blues" and "Break On Through (To the Other Side)") with Hall providing lead vocals. In his last years, Manzarek often sat in with local bands in the Napa County area, where he relocated in the early 2000s.

In 2009, Manzarek collaborated with "Weird Al" Yankovic by playing keyboards on the single "Craigslist", which is a pastiche of the Doors. On the day of Manzarek's death, Yankovic published a personal video of this studio session which he said had been an "extreme honor" and "one of the absolute high points of my life". In May 2010, Manzarek recorded with slide guitarist Roy Rogers. A collaborative album between the two, titled Translucent Blues, was released in mid-2011; its lyrical content is primarily penned by songwriter/poets Jim Carroll and Michael McClure. During June through August 2011, Manzarek recorded "Breakn' a Sweat" with DJ Skrillex and his fellow former Doors members Robby Krieger and John Densmore. In August 2013, Twisted Tales, another Manzarek–Rogers collaboration, was released and dedicated to Manzarek after his death.

== Personal life ==
Manzarek's brothers Rick and Jim Manczarek are musicians, who all played together for Rick & the Ravens. Manzarek removed the 'C' from his surname Manczarek around when the Doors started playing gigs in 1965.

Manzarek married fellow UCLA alumna Dorothy Aiko Fujikawa in Los Angeles on December 21, 1967, with Morrison and his longtime companion Pamela Courson attending. Manzarek and Fujikawa remained married until his death. They have a son, Pablo, and three grandchildren.

In the early 1970s, the Manzareks divided their time between an apartment in West Hollywood, California, and a small penthouse on New York City's Upper West Side. They subsequently resided in Beverly Hills, California (including ten years in a house on Rodeo Drive), for several decades. For the last decade of his life, Manzarek and his wife lived in a refurbished farmhouse near Vichy Springs, California, in the Napa Valley.

Manzarek practiced Atenism, an ancient Egyptian religion last observed in the Eighteenth Dynasty of Egypt, after discovering it in Sigmund Freud's book Moses and Monotheism. He also expressed fondness towards Jesus Christ.

== Death ==
In March 2013, Manzarek was diagnosed with a rare cancer called cholangiocarcinoma (bile duct cancer) and traveled to Germany for special treatment. During that time, before his death, he reconciled with Densmore and spoke to Krieger. He also performed a private concert for his doctors and nurses. According to his manager, Manzarek was "feeling better" until things took a turn for the worse. On May 20, 2013, Manzarek died at a hospital in Rosenheim, Germany, at the age of 74. He was surrounded by his wife and brothers. Krieger said upon hearing the news of his death, "I was deeply saddened to hear about the passing of my friend and bandmate Ray Manzarek today. I'm just glad to have been able to have played Doors songs with him for the last decade. Ray was a huge part of my life, and I will always miss him." Densmore said, "There was no keyboard player on the planet more appropriate to support Jim Morrison's words. Ray, I felt totally in sync with you musically. It was like we were of one mind, holding down the foundation for Robby and Jim to float on top of. I will miss my musical brother."

Greg Harris, president and CEO of the Rock and Roll Hall of Fame, said in reaction to Manzarek's death, "The world of rock 'n' roll lost one of its greats with the passing of Ray Manzarek." Harris also said that "he was instrumental in shaping one of the most influential, controversial and revolutionary groups of the 1960s. Such memorable tracks as "Light My Fire", "People Are Strange" and "Hello, I Love You"—to name but a few—owe much to Manzarek's innovative playing."

== Legacy ==
On February 12, 2016, at the Fonda Theatre in Hollywood, Densmore and Krieger reunited for the first time in 15 years to perform in tribute to Manzarek and benefit Stand Up to Cancer. That day would have been Manzarek's 77th birthday. The night featured Exene Cervenka and John Doe of the band X, Rami Jaffee of the Foo Fighters, Stone Temple Pilots' Robert DeLeo, Jane's Addiction's Stephen Perkins, Emily Armstrong of Dead Sara, and Andrew Watt, among others.

In April 2018, the film Break On Thru: A Celebration of Ray Manzarek and the Doors premiered at the 2018 Asbury Park Music & Film Festival. The film highlights the 2016 concert in honor of what would have been Manzarek's 79th birthday, including new footage and interviews. The film won the APMFF Best Film Feature Award at the festival.

In 2021, Ray Manzarek's short film Evergreen was selected for preservation in the United States National Film Registry by the Library of Congress as being "culturally, historically, or aesthetically significant".

== Discography ==
Details are taken from AllMusic.

The Doors

Solo

- The Golden Scarab (1974)
- The Whole Thing Started with Rock & Roll Now It's Out of Control (1974)
- Carmina Burana (1983)
- Love Her Madly (2006)

Nite City

- Nite City (1977)
- Starwood Club, Los Angeles. 02/23/1977 (1977)
- Golden Days Diamond Nights (1978)

With X

- Los Angeles (1980)
- Wild Gift (1981)
- Under the Big Black Sun (1982)
- More Fun in the New World (1983)

With Piotr Bal

- Atonal Head (2006)

With Echo & the Bunnymen

- "Bedbugs and Ballyhoo" (1987)

With Michael McClure

- Love Lion (1993)
- The Piano Poems: Live From San Francisco (2012)

With Darryl Read

- Freshly Dug (1999)

With Roy Rogers

- Ballads Before The Rain (2008)
- Translucent Blues (2011)
- Twisted Tales (2013)

Spoken word

- The Doors: Myth And Reality, The Spoken Word History (1996)

With "Weird Al" Yankovic

- "Craigslist" (2009)

With poet Michael C. Ford

- Look Each Other in The Ears. Hen House Studio Album includes The Doors : Ray Manzarek, Robby Krieger, and John Densmore. 2014

== Filmography ==
- Love Her Madly (2000). Director and co-writer.
- Induction (1965). Actor (Ray), director, and writer.
- The Wino and the Blind Man (1964). Actor (blind man).
- Evergreen (1965). Writer and Director.
- Deal of the Century (1983). Actor (Charlie Simbo).
- The Poet in Exile (in production).

== Books ==
Non-Fiction

- Light My Fire: My Life With the Doors (1999) ISBN 978-0-6981-5101-7

Fiction

- The Poet in Exile (2001) Thunder's Mouth Press, 2002 paperback: ISBN 1-56025-447-5
- Snake Moon (2006) ISBN 1-59780-041-4

== Trivia ==
- For director Oliver Stone's film The Doors (1991), Manzarek was portrayed by Kyle MacLachlan.

== See also ==
- Outline of the Doors

== Bibliography ==
- Gaar, Gillian G. (2015). The Doors: The Illustrated History. Minneapolis, Minnesota: Voyageur Press. ISBN 978-0-7603-4690-7.
- Gerstenmeyer, Heinz (2001). The Doors – Sounds for Your Soul – Die Musik Der Doors (in German). BoD – Books on Demand. ISBN 978-3-8311-2057-4.
- Fong-Torres, Ben (2006). The Doors. Hyperion Books. ISBN 978-1-4013-0303-7.
- Manzarek, Ray (1999). Light My Fire: My Life with the Doors. New York City: Berkley Boulevard Books. ISBN 0-425-17045-4.
- Shepherd, John (2003). Continuum Encyclopedia of Popular Music of the World: VolumeII: Performance and Production, Volume 11. Continuum. ISBN 978-0-8264-6322-7.
- Weidman, Rich (2011). The Doors FAQ: All That's Left to Know About the Kings of Acid Rock. Backbeat Books. ISBN 978-1617131103.
