= Get Ready (Rare Earth album) =

Studio album by Rare Earth
- Released: September 30, 1969
- Recorded: July 3–17, 1969
- Length: 43:25
- Label: Rare Earth
- Producer: Rare Earth

Rare Earth chronology
Dreams/Answers (1968)	Get Ready (1969)	Ecology (1970)

Singles from Get Ready
- 1. "Get Ready" Released: February 18, 1970

Get Ready is the RIAA Platinum-certified second studio album by American rock band Rare Earth. Released on September 30, 1969, it was one of five albums that launched the Motown subsidiary Rare Earth Records, named after the band.

== Recording ==
Although Motown is best remembered as an African American label due to specializing in soul and R&B music, it did sign a number of white acts, to mixed success. Berry Gordy intended to change this statistic by launching a Motown subsidiary that would specifically focus on white rock artists. The acts Motown signed for the new subsidiary, including Rare Earth, for whom the new label was named, explored blues-oriented and progressive rock styles.

The title track had been recorded by the Temptations previously, whose version had been a hit on the R&B charts, but not the pop charts, and was not considered a success by the Temptations' standards. When Rare Earth was still performing under the name the Sunliners, "Get Ready" was a regular — and popular — part of the band's live set, and was subsequently recorded for their 1968 Verve debut album, Dreams/Answers, but after signing with Motown, executive Barney Ales wanted Rare Earth to re-record it for their debut on Motown's rock subsidiary. After an initial version recorded for the new album was scrapped, the band themselves set up their own recording equipment and recorded a 21 minute version, which later had audience applause dubbed in.

== Release ==
To announce the formation of Motown's rock label, Rare Earth Records released Rare Earth's Get Ready album in a promotional box set alongside four other albums which included Pretty Things' S. F. Sorrow, as well as albums by Love Sculpture, Rustix and the Messengers. The new recording of "Get Ready" was edited down to 2:46 for a single, which was given a Tamla Motown release in the UK, the only release by the band to appear on Motown itself, and unlike the Temptations' version, Rare Earth's recording was a success on the pop chart. The single peaked at #4 on the Billboard Hot 100 chart in 1970.

In 1971, Rare Earth became the first recording group to sue suspected pirates, naming the Lear Jet Corp., Muntz Stereo City, Pan American Distributing Co., Universal Tape Outlet, Stereo City and Harmony House in a suit filed by the band and Rare Earth Records which charged the Lear Jet Corp. with supplying blank tapes to Pan American Distributing Co. which were used to pirate material that appeared on Get Ready and Ecology, the suit contending that in addition to the contractual violation, the pirated tapes were detrimental to the band's professionalism, as the pirated tapes were of a much lower sound quality than the band's official releases.

== Reception ==
Professional ratings
Review scores
Source	Rating
AllMusic	3.0/5 stars

AllMusic wrote that "Rare Earth's Motown debut is as well-oiled as a new V-8".

== Legacy ==
Rare Earth's recording of the song "Get Ready" would later be used in hip hop performances by DJ Kool Herc, who used Rare Earth's breakbeats as part of his turntablism routine. Pioneering hip hop journalist Steven Hager wrote that Rare Earth's recording "was a favorite in the Bronx because it lasted over twenty-one minutes, which was long enough for the serious dancers to get into the beat. They loved to wait for the song's two-minute drum solo to show their most spectacular moves."

== Track listing ==
Side A
No.	Title	Writer(s)	Length
1.	"Magic Key"	Gil Bridges, Kenny Folcik	3:57
2.	"Tobacco Road"	John D. Loudermilk	7:11
3.	"Feelin' Alright"	Dave Mason	5:03
4.	"In Bed"	Lynn Henderson, Tom Baird, Wes Henderson	3:01
5.	"Train to Nowhere"	Kim Simmonds, Chris Youlden	3:23
Total length:			23:05

Side B
No.	Title	Writer(s)	Length
6.	"Get Ready"	William "Smokey" Robinson	21:30
Total length:			21:30

== Personnel ==
Rare Earth

- John Persh – vocals, bass guitar, trombone
- Pete Rivera (Hoorelbeke)– lead vocals, drums
- Rod Richards – vocals, guitar
- Kenny James – vocals, organ, electric piano
- Gil Bridges – vocals, saxophone, tambourine
