= Gil Bridges =

Background information
- Born: Gilbert Bridges; July 14, 1941; Detroit, Michigan, US
- Died: December 8, 2021 (aged 80) Detroit, Michigan, US
- Instruments: Saxophone, flute, vocals
- Years active: 1960–2021
- Formerly of: Rare Earth

Gilbert "Gil" Bridges ( July 14, 1941 — December 8, 2021) was an American musician. He was a member of Rare Earth from 1968 until his 2021 death.

== Career ==
Bridges joined the band The Glo-Worms, but at the suggestion that the band changed their name to The Sunliners, after his car at the time, a 1956 Ford Sunliner. In 1968, the band changed their name to Rare Earth and were the first all white act to sign to Motown Records, specifically to a sub-label dedicated to white artists called Rare Earth records, named after the band.

Rare Earth's biggest hits were covers of other Motown and soul records including "Get Ready" (US No. 4, CAN No. 1), "(I Know) I'm Losing You" (US No. 7), and "What'd I Say" (US No. 61), but are best known for their original song, "I Just Want to Celebrate" (US No. 7). Bridges was the saxophnist for the band, but on stage also provided tambourine and backing vocals if a song did not feature the sax.

At the time of his death, Bridges was the last original member still in Rare Earth. When he died, his wife gave her blessing for keyboardist Mike Bruner (who had joined in 1998) to form a new Rare Earth band with a new lineup, including previous member Wayne Baraks.

== Personal life ==
Bridges was born in Detroit, Michigan, to Leonard and Susie Bridges. He started taking saxophone lessons after his sister suggested he take them. He attended Mumford High School, where he was in the marching band and played the sax for the entire school at his graduation.

He was married to Johnnie Sue Bridges. He had five children, twelve grandchildren and two great-grandchildren. Bridges took flying lessons in high school, and owned his own private planes. Bridges died from COVID-19 on December 8, 2021, aged 80.
