= Rare Earth (band) =

American band

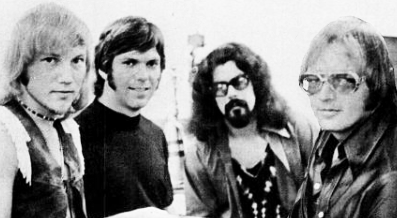
- Rare Earth in 1970. Left to right: Rod Richards, Gil Bridges, Ed Guzman, Peter Rivera (not pictured are Kenny James and John Persh)

Background information
- Also known as: The Sunliners (1960–68)
- Origin: Detroit, Michigan, U.S.
- Genres: Funk rock; psychedelic soul; progressive rock; psychedelic rock; blues rock
- Years active: 1960–present
- Labels: Verve; Rare Earth; Prodigal
- Past members: See past members section
- Website: rareearth.com

Rare Earth is an American band from Detroit, Michigan. According to Louder, "Rare Earth's music straddles genres and defies categorisation, slipping seamlessly between the two seemingly disparate worlds of classic rock and R&B." The band was signed to Motown's subsidiary label Rare Earth. Although not the first white band signed to Motown, Rare Earth was the first successful act signed by Motown that consisted only of white members.

The original band lasted from 1968 to December 2021, during which only saxophonist Gil Bridges remained throughout; when Bridges died in December 2021, keyboardist Mike Bruner (who joined in 1998) had Bridges' wife's blessing to form a new Rare Earth band with a new lineup, including previous member Wayne Baraks.

== History ==
=== 1960s ===
The group formed in 1960 as the Sunliners and changed its name to Rare Earth in 1968. The band felt the name "Rare Earth" was more in keeping with the names other bands were adopting, such as Iron Butterfly, more "with it".

After recording an unsuccessful debut album, Dream/Answers, on the Verve label in 1968, the group was signed to Motown in 1969. The band was one of the first acts signed to a new Motown imprint that would be dedicated to white rock acts; many of the subsidiary's newly signed acts played blues-oriented and progressive rock styles, including Rare Earth themselves. The record company did not have a name for the new label yet and the band jokingly suggested Motown call the label Rare Earth. To the band's surprise, Motown did just that.

The main personnel in the group were Gil Bridges, saxophone, flute, vocals; Peter Hoorelbeke (also known as Peter Rivera), lead vocals, drums; John Parrish (aka John Persh), bass guitar, trombone, vocals; Rod Richards (born Rod Cox in 1941, died in 2015), guitar, vocals; and Kenny James (born Ken Folcik in 1945), keyboards. The group's recording style was hard-driving.

In late 1969, Edward "Eddie" Guzman (congas and assorted percussive instruments) was added to the group.

During 1969, the group contributed music to the film Generation that starred David Janssen and Kim Darby. An accompanying soundtrack album was released, but quickly withdrawn after the film failed commercially, with only a small number of copies sold. Several tracks were remixed and included on the next LP, Ecology, in 1970. The soundtrack album was reissued as a limited-edition LP for Record Store Day 2020. The issue was pressed on hot pink vinyl and limited to a run of 2,000 copies.

=== 1970s ===
Rare Earth had a number of top 40 hits in 1970–71, including remakes of the Temptations' "(I Know) I'm Losing You" and "Get Ready". Each was more successful than the Temptations original, with "Get Ready" being their biggest hit, peaking at number 4 on the US Billboard Hot 100 chart. This disc sold over one million copies and received a gold record awarded by the Recording Industry Association of America.

The group gained a bit of notoriety when it was mentioned dismissively in Gil Scott-Heron's 1970 poem "The Revolution Will Not Be Televised", which included the line "The theme song [to the revolution] will not be written by Jim Webb, Francis Scott Key, nor sung by Glen Campbell, Tom Jones, Johnny Cash, Engelbert Humperdinck, or the Rare Earth."

In 1971 Richards left due to musical differences and James, weary of the group's increased touring schedule, also departed. Ray Monette (guitar) and Mark Olson (keyboards, vocals) joined to replace them.

The group's hits from late 1970 to early 1972 were "Born to Wander" (number 17), "I Just Want to Celebrate" (number 7) and "Hey, Big Brother" (number 19). There were no significant hits thereafter. Nevertheless, the band continued to record into the 1990s.

By 1972, Motown had decided to relocate from Detroit to Los Angeles and Rare Earth soon followed suit. Persh, however, decided not to make the move and was succeeded in the band by Mike Urso.

NBC reported that, at about this time, the police found "reputed mob enforcer" Joe Ulloa started financing the band, which seems to have resulted in the band members being eventually harassed by "strangers" several years later asking if they were hiding money.

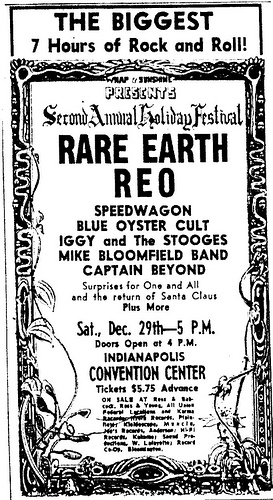
Concert promotion for a 1973 concert with Rare Earth headlining in Indianapolis.

Their 1973 album, Ma, written and produced by Norman Whitfield, is considered one of their best overall works and features their version of "Hum Along and Dance". But the record did not sell well and produced no hits.

Rare Earth was the opening act at California Jam festival in Ontario, California, on April 6, 1974. The festival attracted over 250,000 people, and the band appeared alongside 1970s rock groups Black Sabbath; Emerson, Lake & Palmer; Deep Purple; Earth, Wind & Fire; Seals and Crofts; Black Oak Arkansas and the Eagles. Portions of the show were broadcast on ABC Television in the U.S., exposing the band to a wider audience.

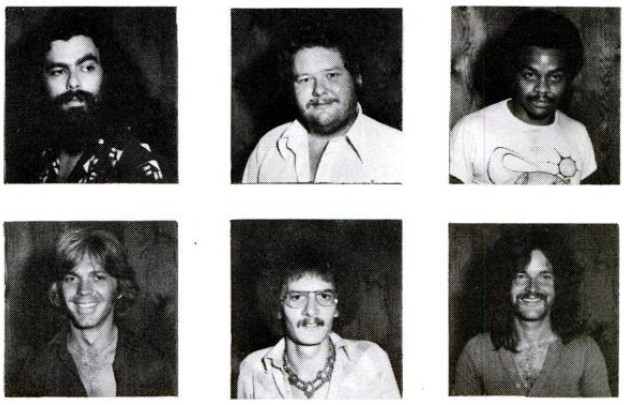
The band in 1974. Top row, left to right: Eddie Guzman, Barry Frost, Reggie McBride. Bottom row, left to right: Gil Bridges, Ray Monette, Jerry LaCroix

Also in 1974, the group began working with Motown producer Frank Wilson. But this proved to be short lived. The Wilson sessions, which would have been the follow-up to Ma, were completed but remained in the vaults of Motown. A proposed double live record, recorded in 1974, and another live set, Live in Chicago, were also shelved.

In July 1974 the group divided, mostly due to Hoorelbeke's falling out with band manager Ron Strasner and most of the others supporting Strasner. Hoorelbeke left the group, along with Mike Urso, and they formed a new band, HUB, with Rare Earth's 1970–1972 co-producer, Tom Baird, using the initials of their surnames (Hoorelbeke, Urso and Baird). HUB recorded two albums for Capitol Records but produced no hits. The project suddenly ended in November 1975 after Baird was killed in a boating accident.

The rest of the band (minus Olson, who left to join the backup band for Jennifer Warnes) decided to continue as Rare Earth and brought in new players: Jerry LaCroix (vocals, sax, harmonica, formerly of the Boogie Kings, Edgar Winter's White Trash and Blood, Sweat & Tears), Paul Warren (guitar, backing vocals), Bartholomew ("Frosty") Eugene Smith-Frost (formerly with Sweathog and Lee Michaels, drums), Reggie McBride (ex-Stevie Wonder, bass) and Gabriel Katona (keyboards).

The new lineup recorded the album Back to Earth in 1975 and went back on the road. However, both Paul Warren and Frosty left during this tour and new drummer Chet McCracken (who would go on to join the Doobie Brothers) was hired to finish out their 1975 tour. The band then recorded Midnight Lady (minus Katona and McCracken), which was released in 1976. Frank Westbrook replaced Katona on keyboards, whilst McCracken was not replaced; instead session musician Ollie Brown handled percussion duties for Midnight Lady. But neither of these releases sold as well as the band had been used to and they soon found themselves bogged down and unable to tour when they brought a lawsuit against former member Hoorelbeke, claiming that he tried to make off with the group's name and retirement monies. Hoorelbeke was found to be innocent and was given a settlement, while the others were given the rights to the name Rare Earth, which Bridges eventually trademarked under Gilbert Bridges Enterprises, and the band continued.

In late 1976, a former Motown vice president, Barney Ales, an earlier champion of Rare Earth, returned to the company to head up one of their new offshoot labels, Prodigal Records. He made an offer to reunite the 1972–1974 members of the band, Bridges, Guzman, Hoorelbeke, Urso, Olson and Monette, to record a new album on Prodigal. Monette and Olson did not agree to the terms and abstained, but the rest of the band agreed to record the album. Session players Dan Ferguson (guitar) and Ron Fransen (keyboards) were brought in to play on Rarearth, which was produced by James Anthony Carmichael and Cal Harris (both of whom later had success with the Commodores and Lionel Richie). It was released in 1977 but failed to live up to expectations.

Later in 1977, the group reassembled with Chicago-based producer John Ryan (who worked with Styx and others) to begin work on two new albums. This time, Monette and Olson agreed to join in and the results were Band Together and Grand Slam, both released in 1978 and featuring more of a late-1970s disco sound, with the former providing the Bee Gees-penned hit "Warm Ride", which peaked at number 39. Other than the solitary hit, neither album was a big seller. Gap Band bassist Robert Wilson contributed to some of the tracks on Band Together.

In June 1979 Urso left the band again. On his recommendation, and after hearing several bass players, the group recruited bassist Ken Johnston, who joined the group's road tours for two years until June 1981. Johnston had just completed a stint with jazz singer Maxine Weldon and had rejoined Las Vegas comedian/songster Kenny Laursen. He interrupted his tour with Laursen to join Rare Earth in Florida.

=== 1980s and 1990s ===
Former Motown writer Dino Fekaris, who had penned the band's hits "I Just Want to Celebrate" and "Hey Big Brother", was next to step back into the group's life in 1980. He had just come off back-to-back successes with Gloria Gaynor and Peaches & Herb and had won a Grammy Award for Gaynor's hit "I Will Survive". RCA expressed interest in the band's new project and gave them an advance to start recording. The project was originally to be titled King of the Mountain, with the title track slated to be the theme of a 1981 movie of the same name that starred Harry Hamlin. But the movie people passed on the song, and when the record was done, RCA was not happy with Fekaris' production, so they passed as well. This album, retitled Tight & Hot, saw a limited release in 1982 in Canada only.

By the summer of 1981, Mike Urso had returned to Rare Earth after a two-year absence, but he left again in mid-1983, and has not returned to the band since. Tim Ellsworth was then brought in as new bassist/vocalist in September 1983. By the end of that year, Peter Hoorelbeke had left the band again after disagreements with Gil Bridges. (Hoorelbeke went on to form the Classic Rock All-Stars in 1992.) Drummer Tony Thomas replaced Hoorelbeke on drums. After Hoorelbeke's departure, Ellsworth and Olson took over lead vocals. By that time most of the members of the band had moved back to Detroit, and the group continued to tour.

Personnel shuffles abounded in the mid-1980s. In September 1984 Bob Weaver took over the drum throne and played with the group into 1985. He was temporarily succeeded by Bob Brock, whose professional name was Bobby Rock (not Bob Rock, the famous Hard rock/Heavy metal producer from Canada), but returned only to be replaced by Jerry LeBloch in mid-1985. Also in September of '84, Andy Merrild replaced Tim Ellsworth as bassist until the end of June 1985. Ellsworth then returned and toured with the group until the end of August of '85. The group's road manager, Randy "Bird" Burghdoff, then took over as Rare Earth's bassist in September 1985 and remained in that position until 2021. Mark Olson was let go in 1986 after increasing personal and substance abuse troubles. Rick Warner was then brought in as the band's new keyboardist and Wayne Baraks, who was recruited in 1987 on rhythm guitar, took over much of the lead vocals as well.

In the late 1980s and early 1990s the personnel changes slowed down somewhat as things stabilized and the band found itself in demand to play on "oldies" bills with other acts of the 1960s and 1970s.

Drummer Dean Boucher replaced LeBloch on drums in 1989 and RE signed with the small foreign label Koch International and began work on a new album. The result was Different World (released in February 1993) which was a collection containing a few covers of older songs and new material. It was mostly overlooked by the public and not even issued in the U.S.

On July 29, 1993 the band suffered the loss of another member when longtime percussionist Eddie Guzman (age 49) died at his home in Howell, Michigan.

The group kept going, though, and brought in new drummer Floyd Stokes Jr., who also took over for the departing Boucher, and took on lead vocal duties too after guitarist Baraks pulled out of the group in 1994.

The band was doing well, touring, with Mike Bruner succeeding Rick Warner in January 1998 and Ivan Greilich's filling in for Ray Monette from 2004 to 2009 until Monette's final departure in 2017.

Rare Earth continued to perform at corporate events on the oldies circuit. Bits from their recordings have been used as samples on recordings as diverse as Beck's "Derelict", UNKLE, and DJ Shadow's "GDMFSOB (feat. Roots Manuva - U.N.K.L.E. uncensored version)", Black Sheep's "Try Counting Sheep", Peanut Butter Wolf's "Tale of Five Cities", Scarface's "Faith", NWA's "Real Niggaz Don't Die" and Eric B. and Rakim's "What's Going On".

=== 2000 and beyond ===
Their hit "I Just Want to Celebrate" has been used in US-wide advertising campaigns by Ford Motor Company, AT&T Corporation, and Nicoderm.

In 2005 Rare Earth was voted into the Michigan Rock and Roll Legends Hall of Fame.

The album A Brand New World was released on CD in 2008 on Rare Earth Music.

In March 2017 longtime guitarist Ray Monette announced his retirement from the band due to recurring back troubles. His replacement was Jerry "Lew" Patterson.

Rare Earth continued playing events such as Disneys Anniversary- Hippie Fest, The Moody Blues Cruises and Classic Rock Festivals.

Rare Earth officially ended in December 2021, following the death of Gil Bridges, the last original member still in the group. But since 2022, keyboardist Mike Bruner has performed with a revamped Rare Earth lineup that includes returning singer/rhythm guitarist Wayne Baraks and new members Dan Medawar (lead guitar, backing vocals), Ronnie Nelson (percussion), Michael "Rollo" Rollin (lead vocals, flute, saxophone), Ron Cousineau (bass, backing vocals} and Keith Christian (drums, backing vocals).

In 2022 Metallica released a live recording from the MusiCares MAP Fund Benefit Concert at Club Nokia in Los Angeles on May 12, 2014. The performance includes a cover of "I Just Want to Celebrate" by Rare Earth.

In 2023 several artists performed Rare Earth's "I Just Want to Celebrate" to kick off the 2023 Grammy Awards.

On April 9, 2026 former Rare Earth guitarist Ray Monette died at the age of 79.

== Deaths ==
John Persh (born John Parrish, 1942) (Rare Earth member from 1968 to 1972) died from a hospital staphylococcal infection on January 27, 1981.

Mark Olson (born 1949/1950) (Rare Earth member from 1971 to 1986) died on April 14, 1991, at the age of 41, from liver disease.

Eddie Guzman (born 1944) (Rare Earth member from 1969 to 1993) died on July 29, 1993 in Howell, Michigan aged 49.

Jerry LaCroix (born October 10, 1943) (Rare Earth member from 1974 to 1976) died on May 7, 2014 aged 70.

Rod Richards (born 1941) (Rare Earth member from 1968 to 1971) died in 2015.

Barry Frost (born Barry Smith, March 20, 1946, Bellingham, Washington) (Rare Earth member from 1974 to 1975) died at home on April 12, 2017 from a long illness aged 71.

Gil Bridges (born Gilbert Bridges, July 14, 1941) (Rare Earth member from 1968 to 2021) died from complications arising from COVID-19 on December 8, 2021, aged 80. Bridges was the only member that recorded on every single track from beginning to end.

Ray Monette (born Raymond Curtis Monette, May 7, 1946 Redford, Michigan), died on April 9, 2026 aged 79

== Members ==
Current members

- Wayne Baraks — rhythm guitar, lead vocals (1987–1994, 2023–present)
- Mike Bruner — keyboards (1998–present)
- Dan Medawar — lead guitar, backing vocals (2023–present)
- Ron Cousineau — bass, backing vocals (2023–present)
- Keith Christian — drums, backing vocals (2023–present)
- Ronnie Nelson — congas, percussion (2023–present)
- Jay "Mocha Man" Waller — saxophone, flute, percussion, lead vocals (2025–present)

== Discography ==
=== Studio albums ===
Year	Album	Chart positions			Certification
Year	Album	US	US R&B	AUS	Certification
1968	Dreams/Answers	—	—	—	
1969	Get Ready	12	4	—	US: Platinum
1969	Generation (Soundtrack)	—	—	—	
1970	Ecology	15	4	—	US: Gold
1971	One World	28	12	30	US: Gold
1972	Willie Remembers	90	46	—	
1973	Ma	65	12	—	
1975	Back to Earth	59	—	—	
1976	Midnight Lady	—	—	—	
1977	Rarearth	187	—	—	
1978	Band Together	156	—	—	
1978	Grand Slam	—	—	—	
1982	Tight and Hot	—	—	—	
1993	Different World	—	—	—	
2008	A Brand New World	—	—	—	
"—" denotes releases that did not chart or were not released in that territory.

=== Live albums ===
Year	Album	Chart positions			Certification
Year	Album	US	US R&B	AUS	Certification
1971	Rare Earth in Concert (double album)	29	19	26	US: Gold
1974	Live in Chicago	—	—	—	
1989	Made in Switzerland	—	—	—	
2004	Rock 'n' Roll Greats RARE EARTH in concert!	—	—	—	
2008	Rare Earth Live	—	—	—	
"—" denotes releases that did not chart or were not released in that territory.

=== Singles ===
Year	Single	Chart positions				Certification
Year	Single	US	US R&B	AUS	CAN	Certification
1969	"Generation, Light Up the Sky"	—	—	—	—	
1970	"Get Ready"	4	20	—	1	US: Gold
1970	"(I Know) I'm Losing You"	7	20	—	15	
1970	"Born to Wander"	17	48	—	12	
1971	"I Just Want to Celebrate"	7	30	83	10	
1971	"Someone to Love"	—	—	—	—	
1971	"Any Man Can Be a Fool"	—	—	—	—	
1971	"Hey Big Brother"	19	40	—	20	
1972	"What'd I Say"	61	—	—	—	
1972	"Good Time Sally"	67	—	—	—	
1972	"We're Gonna Have a Good Time"	93	—	—	—	
1973	"Ma"	108	—	—	—	
1973	"Hum Along and Dance"	110	95	—	—	
1973	"Big John Is My Name"	—	—	—	—	
1974	"Chained"	—	—	—	—	
1975	"Keepin' Me Out of the Storm"	—	—	—	—	
1975	"It Makes You Happy"	106	—	—	—	
1976	"Midnight Lady"	—	—	—	—	
1978	"Warm Ride"	39	—	68	33	
"—" denotes releases that did not chart or were not released in that territory.

=== Compilation albums ===
- 1975 Masters of Rock
- 1976 Disque d'Or
- 1981 Motown Superstar Series, Vol. 16
- 1984 Rare Earth & Grand Funk: Best of 2 Superstar Groups
- 1988 Get Ready/Ecology (Double CD)
- 1991 Greatest Hits & Rare Classics
- 1994 Earth Tones: Essential
- 1995 Anthology: The Best of Rare Earth (2 CD & 2 Cassette Set)
- 1995 Rare Earth featuring Peter Rivera
- 1998 The Very Best of Rare Earth
- 2001 20th Century Masters - The Millennium Collection: The Best of Rare Earth
- 2004 The Collection
- 2005 Get Ready and More Hits
- 2006 Best of Rare Earth
- 2008 Fill Your Head: The Studio Albums 1969-1974
