= Ray Monette =

American musician (1946–2026)

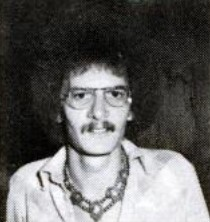
- Monette in 1974

Background information
- Born: Raymond Curtis Monette; May 7, 1946
- Died: April 9, 2026 (aged 79)
- Genres: Rock
- Instrument: Guitar
- Years active: 1960s–2017
- Formerly of: Rare Earth

Raymond Curtis Monette (May 7, 1946 – April 9, 2026) was an American musician, singer and songwriter.

== Early life ==
Raymond Curtis Monette was born on May 7, 1946 in Redford, Michigan to Ernest Antoine Monette and Geraldine Grace (Trowbridge) Monette. He had a brother, Lanny David Monette, who predeceased him, and a sister, Patricia. Monette was raised in Detroit. Monette first decided to have a career in music when he was thirteen years old, and his parents soon bought him his first guitar.

== Career ==
He started his career as a session musician with Motown. He was also a songwriter and, in 1967 Detroit started a band called The Abstract Reality, who released a 45 rpm single "Love Burns Like A Fire Inside". He formed Scorpion with Mike Campbell, Bob 'Babbitt' Kreinar and Andrew Smith. His name appears on Scorpion and Meat Loaf's debut album Stoney & Meatloaf (1971). For that recording, Monette co-wrote four songs. That same year, he played tenor guitar on "Evolution" by Dennis Coffey & the Detroit Guitar Band, and played a guitar solo on Funkadelic's "I Got A Thing, You Got A Thing, Everybody's Got A Thing". He was guitarist and singer for Rare Earth from 1971 until 2004 (with a break around 1977). Monette played guitar on one of Rare Earth's most memorable singles, "I Just Want to Celebrate" and was the guitarist on the gold-selling 1971 live album, Rare Earth in Concert.

In 2010, Monette played on the Phil Collins album, Going Back.

== Personal life ==
Monette married his wife Judith Lee Ricketts, who he met in high school, on November 26, 1966. They had three children: a daughter, born in 1967 who died from SIDS in 1968, and two sons, born in 1970 and 1976. They also have two grandchildren.

Monette died on April 9, 2026, at the age of 79.
