= The Temptations discography =

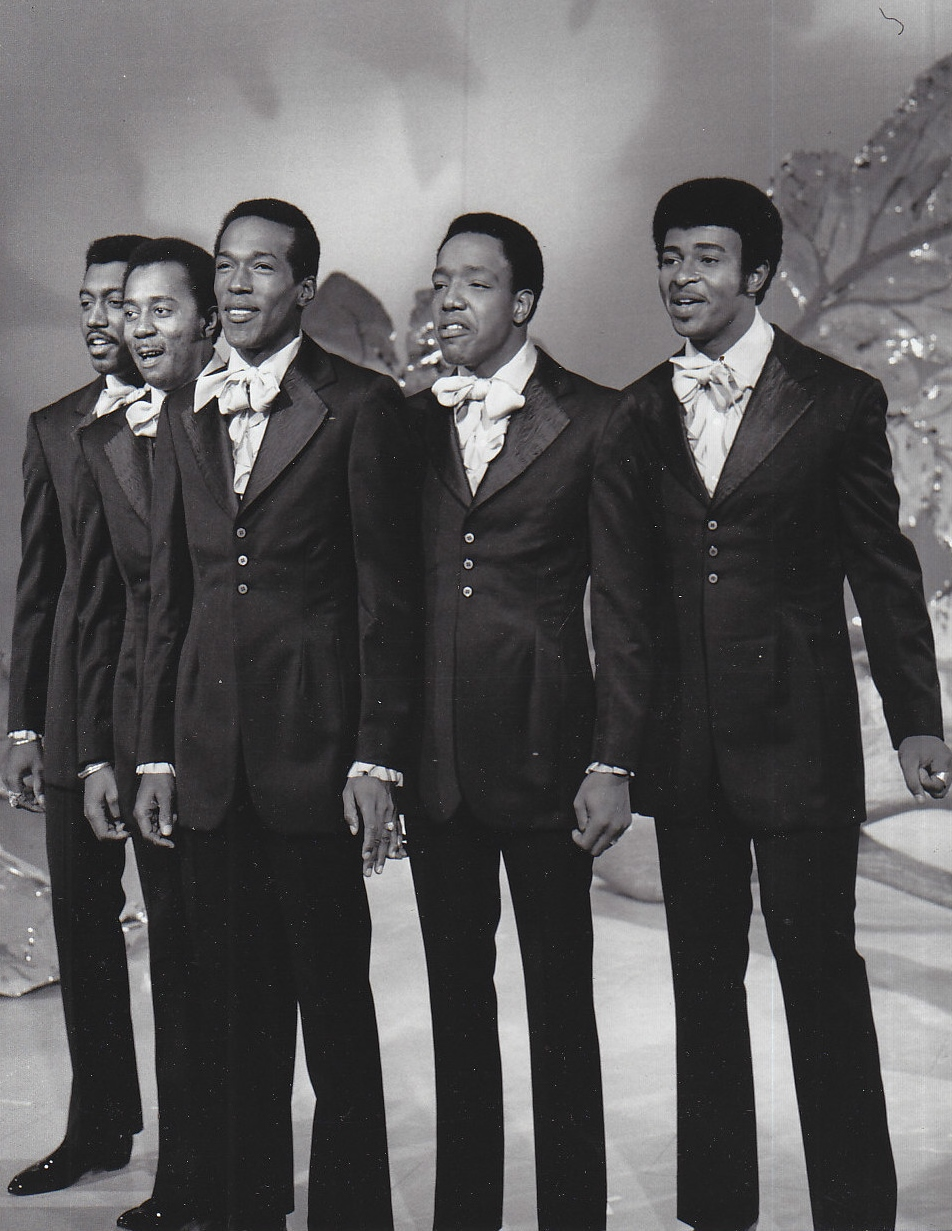
- The Temptations perform on The Ed Sullivan Show circa 1969
- Studio albums: 43
- Soundtrack albums: 3
- Live albums: 4
- Compilation albums: 15
- Singles: 109

This article presents the discography of Motown group The Temptations. They had 37 singles reach the Billboard Top 40 in the US, with four reaching #1. On the R&B singles chart, the group scored a record 71 Top 40 singles, with 15 reaching #1 making them the top male vocal group with the most on that chart.

== Albums ==
=== Studio albums ===
==== 1964–1976: Gordy Records ====
| Title | Year | Peak chart positions | | | | | | | | | | Certifications |
| Title | Year | US | US R&B | AUS | CAN | FIN | GER | JPN | SPA | SWE | UK | Certifications |
|---|---|---|---|---|---|---|---|---|---|---|---|---|
| Meet the Temptations | 1964 | 95 | — | — | — | — | — | — | — | — | — | |
| The Temptations Sing Smokey | 1965 | 35 | 1 | — | — | — | — | — | — | — | — | |
| The Temptin' Temptations | 1965 | 11 | 1 | — | — | — | — | — | — | — | — | |
| Gettin' Ready | 1966 | 12 | 1 | — | — | — | — | — | — | — | 40 | |
| The Temptations with a Lot o' Soul | 1967 | 7 | 1 | — | — | — | — | — | — | — | 19 | |
| The Temptations in a Mellow Mood | 1967 | 13 | 1 | — | — | — | — | — | — | — | — | |
| The Temptations Wish It Would Rain | 1968 | 13 | 1 | — | 44 | — | — | — | — | — | — | |
| Diana Ross & the Supremes Join the Temptations (with Diana Ross & The Supremes) | 1968 | 2 | 1 | — | 5 | — | — | — | — | — | 1 | RIAA: Gold |
| Cloud Nine | 1969 | 4 | 1 | — | 12 | — | — | — | — | — | 32 | RIAA: Gold |
| Together (with Diana Ross & The Supremes) | 1969 | 28 | 6 | — | 29 | — | — | — | — | — | 28 | |
| Puzzle People | 1969 | 5 | 1 | — | 8 | — | — | 82 | — | — | 20 | RIAA: Gold |
| Psychedelic Shack | 1970 | 9 | 1 | — | 43 | — | — | — | — | — | — | RIAA: Gold |
| The Temptations Christmas Card | 1970 | — | — | — | — | — | — | — | — | — | — | RIAA: Gold |
| Sky's the Limit | 1971 | 16 | 2 | — | 73 | — | — | — | — | — | — | RIAA: Gold |
| Solid Rock | 1972 | 24 | 1 | — | — | — | — | — | — | — | 34 | |
| All Directions | 1972 | 2 | 1 | — | 26 | — | 20 | — | 9 | — | 19 | RIAA: Gold |
| Masterpiece | 1973 | 7 | 1 | — | — | — | 17 | — | 13 | — | 28 | RIAA: Gold |
| 1990 | 1973 | 19 | 2 | 98 | 57 | 24 | 25 | 46 | 13 | — | — | |
| A Song for You | 1975 | 13 | 1 | 77 | 14 | 9 | — | 62 | — | — | — | RIAA: Gold |
| House Party | 1975 | 40 | 11 | — | — | — | — | — | — | — | — | |
| Wings of Love | 1976 | 29 | 3 | — | 42 | 16 | — | — | — | 32 | — | |
| The Temptations Do The Temptations | 1976 | 53 | 10 | — | — | — | — | — | — | — | — | |
"—" denotes releases that did not chart or were not released in that territory.

==== 1977–1978: Atlantic Records ====
| Title | Year | Peak chart positions | |
| Title | Year | US | US R&B |
|---|---|---|---|
| Hear to Tempt You | 1977 | 113 | 38 |
| Bare Back | 1978 | — | 46 |

==== 1980–1986: Return to Gordy Records ====
| Title | Year | Peak chart positions | | | | | Certifications |
| Title | Year | US | US R&B | GER | NZ | UK | Certifications |
|---|---|---|---|---|---|---|---|
| Power | 1980 | 45 | 13 | — | — | — | |
| Give Love at Christmas | 1980 | — | — | — | — | — | RIAA: Gold |
| The Temptations | 1981 | 119 | 36 | 46 | — | — | |
| Reunion | 1982 | 37 | 2 | — | — | — | |
| Surface Thrills | 1983 | 159 | 19 | — | — | — | |
| Back to Basics | 1983 | 152 | 30 | — | — | — | |
| Truly for You | 1984 | 55 | 3 | 43 | 25 | 75 | |
| Touch Me | 1985 | 146 | 20 | — | — | — | |
| To Be Continued... | 1986 | 74 | 4 | — | — | — | |
"—" denotes releases that did not chart or were not released in that territory.

==== 1987–2004: Motown Records ====
| Title | Year | Peak chart positions | | Certifications |
| Title | Year | US | US R&B | Certifications |
|---|---|---|---|---|
| Together Again | 1987 | 112 | 12 | |
| Special | 1989 | 128 | 25 | |
| Milestone | 1991 | — | 88 | |
| For Lovers Only | 1995 | — | 43 | |
| Phoenix Rising | 1998 | 44 | 8 | RIAA: Platinum |
| Ear-Resistible | 2000 | 54 | 16 | |
| Awesome | 2001 | 140 | 27 | |
| Legacy | 2004 | 163 | 18 | |
"—" denotes releases that did not chart or were not released in that territory.

==== 2006–2007: New Door Records ====
| Title | Year | Peak chart positions | |
| Title | Year | US | US R&B |
|---|---|---|---|
| Reflections | 2006 | 80 | 14 |
| Back to Front | 2007 | 108 | 19 |

==== 2010–2022: 10/30 International and UME Direct ====
| Title | Year | Peak chart positions |
| Title | Year | US R&B |
|---|---|---|
| Still Here | 2010 | 48 |
| All the Time | 2018 | — |
| Temptations 60 | 2022 | — |

=== Live albums ===
| Title | Year | Peak chart positions | | | |
| Title | Year | US | US R&B | CAN | UK |
|---|---|---|---|---|---|
| Temptations Live! | 1967 | 10 | 1 | 20 | 20 |
| Live at the Copa | 1968 | 15 | 2 | — | — |
| Live at London's Talk of the Town | 1970 | 21 | 5 | — | — |
| The Temptations in Japan | 1973 | — | — | — | — |
"—" denotes releases that did not chart or were not released in that territory.

=== Compilation albums ===
| Title | Year | Peak chart positions | | | | Certifications | Sales |
| Title | Year | US | US R&B | SCO | UK | Certifications | Sales |
|---|---|---|---|---|---|---|---|
| Greatest Hits | 1966 | 5 | 1 | — | 17 | RIAA: 2× Platinum | |
| Greatest Hits II | 1970 | 15 | 2 | — | 28 | RIAA: Gold | |
| Anthology (re-released with additional tracks in 1986 and 1995) | 1973 | 65 | 5 | — | — | RIAA: Platinum | |
| All the Million Sellers | 1981 | — | — | — | — | RIAA: Platinum | |
| Great Songs and Performances That Inspired the Motown 25th Anniversary T.V. Special | 1983 | — | — | — | — | RIAA: Gold | |
| The Temptations 25th Anniversary | 1986 | 140 | 55 | — | — | | |
| Motown's Greatest Hits | 1992 | — | — | — | 8 | | |
| Emperors of Soul | 1994 | — | 52 | — | — | | |
| The Ultimate Collection | 1997 | 137 | 60 | — | — | RIAA: Gold | |
| Lost and Found: You've Got to Earn It (1962–1968) | 1999 | — | — | — | — | | |
| 20th Century Masters – The Millennium Collection: The Best of The Temptations, Volume 1 – The '60s | 2000 | 73 | — (Note: 20th Century Masters – The Millennium Collection: The Best of The Temptations, Volume 1 – The '60s did not chart on Billboard's Top R&B/Hip-Hop Albums, but it peaked at #21 on Billboard's Top R&B Albums chart.) | — | — | RIAA: Platinum | US: 1,342,761 (Note: United States sales figure for 20th Century Masters – The Millennium Collection: The Best of The Temptations, Volume 1 – The '60s, as of 2013.) |
| 20th Century Masters – The Millennium Collection: The Best of the Temptations, Vol. 2 – The 70s, 80s, and 90s | 2000 | — | — | — | — | | |
| The Temptations at Their Very Best | 2001 | — | — | 51 | 28 | BPI: Gold | |
| The Best of the Temptations Christmas | 2001 | 102 | 55 | — | | | |
| My Girl: The Very Best of the Temptations (re-released in 2005 as The Temptations: Gold) | 2002 | 167 | — | — | — | | |
| Psychedelic Soul | 2003 | — | — | — | — | | |
| Classic Soul Hits | 2008 | — | — | 18 | 8 | | |
| The Definitive Collection | 2008 | — | — | — | — | BPI: Gold | |
| Icon | 2010 | — | 29 | — | — | | US: 268,755 |
| 50th Anniversary – The Singles Collection (1961–1971) | 2011 | — | — | — | — | | |
"—" denotes releases that did not chart or were not released in that territory.

=== Soundtrack albums ===
| Title | Year | Peak chart positions | | | | Certifications |
| Title | Year | US | US R&B | CAN | UK | Certifications |
|---|---|---|---|---|---|---|
| TCB (with Diana Ross & The Supremes) | 1968 | 1 | 1 | 2 | 11 | RIAA: Gold |
| The Temptations Show | 1969 | 24 | 2 | — | — | |
| On Broadway (with Diana Ross & The Supremes) | 1969 | 38 | 4 | — | — | |
"—" denotes releases that did not chart or were not released in that territory.

== Singles ==
=== As Otis Williams & The Siberians ===
- 1958: "Pecos Kid" b/w "All of My Life"

=== As The Distants ===
- 1959: "Come On" b/w "Always" (with The Andantes)
- 1960: "Open Your Heart" b/w "All Right"

=== 1960s ===
| Title | Year | Peak chart positions | | | | | | | | Certifications | Sales | Album |
| Title | Year | US | US R&B | BEL (WA) | CAN | GER | IRE | NLD | UK | Certifications | Sales | Album |
|---|---|---|---|---|---|---|---|---|---|---|---|---|
| "Oh Mother of Mine" | 1961 | — | — | — | — | — | — | — | — | | | Meet the Temptations |
| "Check Yourself" | 1961 | — | — | — | — | — | — | — | — | | | Meet the Temptations |
| "(You're My) Dream Come True" | 1962 | — | 22 | — | — | — | — | — | — | | | Meet the Temptations |
| "Mind Over Matter (I'm Gonna Make You Mine)" (credited as The Pirates) | 1962 | — | — | — | — | — | — | — | — | | | Non-album single |
| "Paradise" | 1962 | 122 | — | — | — | — | — | — | — | | | Meet the Temptations |
| "I Want a Love I Can See" | 1963 | — | — | — | — | — | — | — | — | | | Meet the Temptations |
| "Farewell My Love" | 1963 | — | — | — | — | — | — | — | — | | | Meet the Temptations |
| "The Way You Do the Things You Do" | 1964 | 11 | 1 | — | 43 | — | — | — | — | | | Meet the Temptations |
| "I'll Be in Trouble" | 1964 | 33 | 22 | — | 28 | — | — | — | — | | | The Temptin' Temptations |
| "The Girl's Alright with Me" (B-side of "I'll Be In Trouble" ) | 1964 | 102 | 39 | — | — | — | — | — | — | | | The Temptin' Temptations |
| "Girl (Why You Wanna Make Me Blue)" | 1964 | 26 | 11 | — | 15 | — | — | — | — | | | The Temptin' Temptations |
| "My Girl" (original release or 1992 reissue) | 1964 | 1 | 1 | — | 8 | 66 | 2 | 27 | 2 | RIAA: 7× Platinum; BPI: 3× Platinum; IFPI DEN: Gold; RMNZ: 5× Platinum | | The Temptations Sing Smokey |
| "It's Growing" | 1965 | 18 | 3 | — | 14 | — | — | — | 45 | | | The Temptations Sing Smokey |
| "Since I Lost My Baby" | 1965 | 17 | 4 | — | — | — | — | — | — | | | The Temptin' Temptations |
| "You've Got to Earn It" (B-side of "Since I Lost My Baby") | 1965 | 123 | 22 | — | — | — | — | — | — | | | The Temptin' Temptations |
| "My Baby" | 1965 | 13 | 4 | — | — | — | — | — | — | | | The Temptin' Temptations |
| "Don’t Look Back" (B-side of "My Baby") | 1965 | 83 | 15 | — | — | — | — | — | — | | | The Temptin' Temptations |
| "Get Ready" | 1966 | 29 | 1 | — | 32 | — | — | — | 10 | BPI: Silver | | Gettin' Ready |
| "Ain't Too Proud to Beg" | 1966 | 13 | 1 | — | 32 | — | — | — | 21 | RIAA: Gold; BPI: Silver; RMNZ: Gold | UK: 86,000 (Note: United Kingdom digital sales figure for "Ain't Too Proud to Beg", as of 2019.) | Gettin' Ready |
| "Beauty Is Only Skin Deep" | 1966 | 3 | 1 | — | 3 | — | — | — | 18 | RIAA: Gold | | Greatest Hits |
| "(I Know) I'm Losing You" | 1966 | 8 | 1 | — | 33 | — | — | — | 19 | RIAA: Gold | | With a Lot o' Soul |
| "All I Need" | 1967 | 8 | 2 | — | — (Note: "All I Need" did not chart on the RPM singles chart, but it peaked at #4 on the RPM Soul Survey chart.) | — | — | — | — | | | With a Lot o' Soul |
| "You're My Everything" | 1967 | 6 | 3 | — | — | — | — | — | 26 | RIAA: Gold | | With a Lot o' Soul |
| "I've Been Good to You" (B-side of "You're My Everything") | 1967 | 124 | — | — | — | — | — | — | — | | | Gettin' Ready |
| "(Loneliness Made Me Realize) It's You That I Need" | 1967 | 14 | 3 | — | — | — | — | — | — | | | With a Lot o' Soul |
| "I Wish It Would Rain" | 1968 | 4 | 1 | — | — | — | — | — | 45 | RIAA: Gold | | The Temptations Wish It Would Rain |
| "I Truly, Truly Believe" (B-side of "I Wish It Would Rain") | 1968 | 116 | 41 | — | — | — | — | — | — | RIAA: Gold | | The Temptations Wish It Would Rain |
| "I Could Never Love Another (After Loving You)" | 1968 | 13 | 1 | — | 49 | — | — | — | 47 | RIAA: Gold | | The Temptations Wish It Would Rain |
| "Please Return Your Love to Me" | 1968 | 26 | 4 | — | 26 | — | — | — | — | | | The Temptations Wish It Would Rain |
| "Cloud Nine" | 1968 | 6 | 2 | — | 9 | — | — | — | 15 | RIAA: Gold | | Cloud Nine |
| "Rudolph the Red-Nosed Reindeer" | 1968 | — | — | — | — | — | — | — | — | | | Merry Christmas from Motown |
| "Silent Night" (B-side of "Rudolph the Red-Nosed Reindeer") | 1968 | — | — | — | — | — | — | — | — | | | Merry Christmas from Motown |
| "I'm Gonna Make You Love Me" (Diana Ross & the Supremes and The Temptations) | 1969 | 2 | 2 | 47 | 2 | — | 6 | — | 3 | RIAA: Platinum | | Diana Ross and the Supremes Join the Temptations |
| "Runaway Child, Running Wild" | 1969 | 6 | 1 | — | 12 | — | — | — | — | RIAA: Gold | | Cloud Nine |
| "I'll Try Something New" (Diana Ross & the Supremes and The Temptations) | 1969 | 25 | 8 | — | 16 | — | — | — | — | | | Diana Ross and the Supremes Join the Temptations |
| "Don't Let the Joneses Get You Down" | 1969 | 20 | 2 | — | 34 | — | — | — | — | | | Puzzle People |
| "I Second That Emotion" (Diana Ross & the Supremes and The Temptations) | 1969 | — | — | — | — | — | — | — | 18 | | | Diana Ross and the Supremes Join the Temptations |
| "I Can't Get Next to You" | 1969 | 1 | 1 | — | 11 | — | — | — | 13 | RIAA: Platinum | | Puzzle People |
| "The Weight" (Diana Ross & the Supremes and The Temptations) | 1969 | 46 | 4 | — | — | — | — | — | — | | | Together |
"—" denotes releases that did not chart or were not released in that territory.

=== 1970s ===
| Title | Year | Peak chart positions | | | | | | | | Certifications | Sales | Album |
| Title | Year | US | US R&B | BEL (FL) | BEL (WA) | CAN | GER | NLD | UK | Certifications | Sales | Album |
|---|---|---|---|---|---|---|---|---|---|---|---|---|
| "Psychedelic Shack" | 1970 | 7 | 2 | — | — | 5 | — | — | 33 | RIAA: Gold | | Psychedelic Shack |
| "Why (Must We Fall in Love)" (Diana Ross & the Supremes and The Temptations) | 1970 | — | — | — | — | — | — | — | 31 | | | Together |
| "Ball of Confusion (That's What the World Is Today)" | 1970 | 3 | 2 | — | — | 5 | — | 30 | 7 | RIAA: Platinum | EU: 500,000 (Note: Europe sales figure for "Ball of Confusion (That's What the World Is Today)", as of 1971.) | Greatest Hits II |
| "Ungena Za Ulimwengu (Unite the World)" | 1970 | 33 | 8 | — | — | 85 | — | — | — | | | Sky's the Limit |
| "Just My Imagination (Running Away with Me)" | 1971 | 1 | 1 | — | — | 72 | — | — | 8 | RIAA: Platinum; BPI: Silver; RMNZ: Gold | UK: 66,000 (Note: United Kingdom digital sales figure for "Just My Imagination (Running Away with Me)", as of 2019.) | Sky's the Limit |
| "It's Summer" | 1971 | 51 | 29 | — | — | 83 | — | — | — | | | Solid Rock |
| "Superstar (Remember How You Got Where You Are)" | 1971 | 18 | 8 | — | — | 26 | — | — | 32 | RIAA: Gold | | Solid Rock |
| "Take a Look Around" | 1972 | 30 | 10 | — | — | — | — | — | 13 | | | Solid Rock |
| "Mother Nature" | 1972 | 92 | 27 | — | — | — | — | — | — | | | All Directions |
| "Funky Music Sho Nuff Turns Me On" (B-side of "Mother Nature") | 1972 | — | — | — | — | — | — | — | — | | | All Directions |
| "Papa Was a Rollin' Stone" | 1972 | 1 | 5 | 16 | 13 | 12 | 11 | 3 | 14 | RIAA: Platinum; BPI: Silver; RMNZ: Gold | | All Directions |
| "Masterpiece" | 1973 | 7 | 1 | — | 13 | 41 | 21 | — | 51 (Note: Chart position is from the official UK "Breakers List".) | RIAA: Gold | | Masterpiece |
| "Plastic Man" | 1973 | 40 | 8 | — | — | — | — | — | — | | | Masterpiece |
| "Hey Girl (I Like Your Style)" | 1973 | 35 | 2 | — | — | — | — | — | — | | | Masterpiece |
| "Law of the Land" | 1973 | — | — | — | — | — | — | — | 41 | | | Masterpiece |
| "Let Your Hair Down" (instrumentation by Rose Royce) | 1973 | 27 | 1 | — | — | 44 | — | — | — | | | 1990 |
| "Heavenly" | 1974 | 43 | 8 | — | — | 52 | — | — | — | | | 1990 |
| "You've Got My Soul on Fire" | 1974 | 74 | 8 | — | — | 47 | — | — | — | | | 1990 |
| "Happy People" (instrumentation by The Commodores) | 1974 | 40 | 1 | — | — | 53 | — | — | — | | | A Song for You |
| "Shakey Ground" (instrumentation by The Eddie Hazel Band) | 1975 | 26 | 1 | — | — | 39 | — | — | — | | | A Song for You |
| "Glasshouse" | 1975 | 37 | 9 | — | — | 69 | — | — | — | | | A Song for You |
| "Keep Holdin' On" | 1976 | 54 | 3 | — | — | — | — | — | — | | | House Party |
| "Up the Creek (Without a Paddle)" | 1976 | 94 | 21 | — | — | — | — | — | — | | | Wings of Love |
| "Who Are You (And What Are You Doing the Rest of Your Life)" | 1976 | — | 22 | — | — | — | — | — | — | | | The Temptations Do the Temptations |
| "In a Lifetime" | 1977 | — | 21 | — | — | — | — | — | — | | | Hear to Tempt You |
| "Think for Yourself" | 1978 | — | 58 | — | — | — | — | — | — | | | Hear to Tempt You |
| "Bare Back" | 1978 | — | 42 | — | — | — | — | — | — | | | Bare Back |
| "Ever Ready Love" | 1978 | — | 31 | — | — | — | — | — | — | | | Bare Back |
"—" denotes releases that did not chart or were not released in that territory.

=== 1980s ===
| Title | Year | Peak chart positions | | | | | | | Certifications | Album |
| Title | Year | US | US R&B | BEL (FL) | CAN | IRE | NLD | UK | Certifications | Album |
|---|---|---|---|---|---|---|---|---|---|---|
| "Power" | 1980 | 43 | 11 | 8 | — | — | 8 | — | | Power |
| "Struck by Lightning Twice" | 1980 | — | 55 | — | — | — | — | — | | Power |
| "Take Me Away" | 1980 | — | 69 | — | — | — | — | — | | Loving Couples soundtrack |
| "Aiming at Your Heart" | 1981 | 67 | 36 | — | — | — | — | — | | The Temptations |
| "Oh What a Night" | 1981 | 104 | — | — | — | — | — | — | | The Temptations |
| "Standing on the Top" (featuring Rick James) | 1982 | 66 | 6 | 29 | 32 | — | — | 53 | | Reunion |
| "More on the Inside" | 1982 | — | 82 | — | — | — | — | — | | Reunion |
| "Love on My Mind Tonight" | 1983 | 88 | 17 | — | — | — | — | — | | Surface Thrills |
| "Miss Busy Body (Get Your Body Busy)" | 1983 | — | 67 | — | — | — | — | — | | Back to Basics |
| "Sail Away" | 1983 | 54 | 13 | — | — | — | — | — | | Back to Basics |
| "Treat Her Like a Lady" | 1984 | 48 | 2 | 25 | — | 10 | 16 | 12 | RMNZ: Platinum | Truly for You |
| "My Love Is True (Truly for You)" | 1985 | — | 14 | — | — | — | — (Note: "My Love Is True (Truly For You)" did not chart in the Dutch Top 50 singles chart but spent 1 week in the unnumbered Single Tip chart.) | 84 | | Truly for You |
| "How Can You Say That It's Over" | 1985 | — | 81 | — | — | — | — | — | | Truly for You |
| "Do You Really Love Your Baby" | 1985 | — | 14 | — | — | — | — | 88 | | Touch Me |
| "Touch Me" | 1986 | — | 63 | — | — | — | — | — | | Touch Me |
| "A Fine Mess" | 1986 | — | 63 | — | — | — | — | — | | To Be Continued... |
| "I'm Fascinated" | 1986 | — | — | — | — | — | — | 84 | | To Be Continued... |
| "Lady Soul" | 1986 | 47 | 4 | — | — | — | — | — | RMNZ: Platinum | To Be Continued... |
| "To Be Continued..." | 1986 | — | 25 | — | — | — | — | — | | To Be Continued... |
| "Someone" | 1987 | — | 45 | — | — | — | — | — | | To Be Continued... |
| "I Wonder Who She's Seeing Now" | 1987 | — | 3 | — | — | — | — | 90 | | Together Again |
| "Look What You Started" | 1987 | — | 8 | — | — | — | — | 63 | | Together Again |
| "Do You Wanna Go with Me" | 1988 | — | 53 | — | — | — | — | — | | Together Again |
| "All I Want from You" | 1989 | — | 16 | — | — | — | — | 71 | | Special |
| "Special" | 1989 | — | 10 | — | — | — | — | — | | Special |
"—" denotes releases that did not chart or were not released in that territory.

=== 1990s ===
| Title | Year | Peak chart positions | | | | | | Certifications | Album |
| Title | Year | US | US R&B | BEL (FL) | CAN | NLD | UK | Certifications | Album |
|---|---|---|---|---|---|---|---|---|---|
| "Soul to Soul" | 1990 | — | 12 | — | — | 34 | — | | Special |
| "The Motown Song" (Rod Stewart featuring the Temptations) | 1991 | 10 | — | 42 | 1 | — | 10 | | Vagabond Heart |
| "The Jones'" | 1991 | — | 41 | — | — | 58 | 69 | | Milestone |
| "Hoops of Fire" | 1992 | — | 68 | — | — | — | — | | Milestone |
| "Error of Our Ways" | 1994 | — | 86 | — | — | — | — | | Emperors of Soul |
"—" denotes releases that did not chart or were not released in that territory.

=== Other charted songs ===
| Title | Year | Peak chart positions | | Certifications | Album |
| Title | Year | US | US R&B | Certifications | Album |
|---|---|---|---|---|---|
| "Silent Night" | 1995 | — | 16 | | Give Love on Christmas Day |
| "Some Enchanted Evening" | 1995 | — | 40 | | For Lovers Only |
| "Stay" | 1998 | 120 | 28 | | Phoenix Rising |
| "This Is My Promise" | 1999 | — | 54 | | Phoenix Rising |
| "How Could He Hurt You" | 1999 | — | 57 | | Phoenix Rising |
| "I'm Here" | 2000 | — | 40 | | Ear-Resistible |
"—" denotes releases that did not chart or were not released in that territory.
