= Anthology (The Temptations album) =

Greatest hits album by The Temptations
- Released: August 23, 1973 (version 1); 1986 (version 2); May 23, 1995 (version 3)
- Recorded: 1964–1986
- Genre: R&B; soul; disco
- Length: 153:51
- Label: Motown; M782A3 (LP); 31453-0524-2 (1995 CD)
- Producer: Smokey Robinson, Ronnie White, Norman Whitfield, Jeffrey Bowen, Frank Wilson, Harvey Fuqua, Johnny Bristol, Nick Ashford, Berry Gordy, Clarence Paul, Rick James, Albert Philip McKay, Ralph Johnson, Peter Bunetta, Rick Chudacoff

Alternative covers
- Cover for 1986 version

Alternative cover
- Cover for 1995 version

Professional ratings
Review scores
Source	Rating
AllMusic	5/5 stars
Tom Hull	A− (1995 CD)

Anthology: The Temptations is one of three greatest hits collections released by Motown Records covering the work of soul/R&B group The Temptations. The initial release was a vinyl three-LP set issued on August 23, 1973, which covered the group's work up to that point. A compact disc double album version was issued in 1986, including five additional tracks recorded between 1973 and 1984. The third and final version of Anthology (released as The Best of The Temptations in Europe), also a 2-CD release, was issued on May 23, 1995, with a further re-tooled track listing. In 2003, the album was ranked number 398 on Rolling Stone magazine's list of the 500 greatest albums of all time; the list's 2012 edition had it ranked 400th, while on the 2020 edition it was ranked at number 371.

== 1973 LP track listing ==
=== Side 1 ===
1. The Way You Do the Things You Do (Smokey Robinson, Bobby Rogers)
2. I'll Be in Trouble (Robinson)
3. The Girl's Alright with Me (Norman Whitfield, Eddie Kendricks, Eddie Holland)
4. Girl (Why You Wanna Make Me Blue) (Whitfield, Holland)
5. My Girl (Robinson, Ronnie White)
6. It's Growing (Robinson, Pete Moore)
7. Since I Lost My Baby (Robinson, Moore)

=== Side 2 ===
1. My Baby (Robinson, Moore, Rogers)
2. Don't Look Back (Robinson, White)
3. Get Ready (Robinson)
4. Ain't Too Proud to Beg (Whitfield, Holland)
5. Beauty Is Only Skin Deep (Whitfield, Holland)
6. (I Know) I'm Losing You (Cornelius Grant, Whitfield, Holland)
7. All I Need (Frank Wilson, Holland, R. Dean Taylor)

=== Side 3 ===
1. You're My Everything (Roger Penzabene, Whitfield, Grant)
2. (Loneliness Made Me Realize) It's You That I Need (Whitfield, Holland)
3. I Wish It Would Rain (Whitfield, Barrett Strong, Penzabene)
4. I Truly, Truly Believe (George Gordy, Margaret Gordy, Allen Story)
5. I Could Never Love Another (After Loving You) (Whitfield, Strong, Penzabene)
6. Please Return Your Love to Me (Whitfield, Strong, Barbara Neely)
7. Cloud Nine (Whitfield, Strong)

=== Side 4 ===
1. Runaway Child, Running Wild (Whitfield, Strong)
2. Don't Let The Joneses Get You Down (Whitfield, Strong)
3. I Can't Get Next to You (Whitfield, Strong)
4. Psychedelic Shack (Whitfield, Strong)
5. Ball of Confusion (That's What the World Is Today) (Whitfield, Strong)

=== Side 5 ===
1. Funky Music Sho' 'Nuff Turns Me On (Whitfield, Strong)
2. I Ain't Got Nothin' (C. Maurice King, Evans King)
3. Ol' Man River (Jerome Kern, Oscar Hammerstein II)
4. Try To Remember (Harvey Schmidt, Tom Jones)
5. The Impossible Dream (Joe Darion, Mitch Leigh)
6. I'm Gonna Make You Love Me (Kenny Gamble, Leon Huff, Jerry Ross)

=== Side 6 ===
1. Just My Imagination (Running Away with Me) (Whitfield, Strong)
2. Superstar (Remember How You Got Where You Are) (Whitfield, Strong)
3. Mother Nature (Nick Zesses, Dino Fekaris)
4. Love Woke Me Up This Morning (Nick Ashford, Valerie Simpson)
5. Papa Was a Rollin' Stone (Whitfield, Strong)

== 1986 track listing ==
=== Disc 1 ===
1. "The Way You Do The Things You Do"
2. "I'll Be In Trouble"
3. "The Girl's Alright With Me"
4. "Girl (Why You Wanna Make Me Blue)"
5. "My Girl"
6. "It's Growing"
7. "Since I Lost My Baby"
8. "My Baby"
9. "Don't Look Back"
10. "Get Ready"
11. "Ain't Too Proud To Beg"
12. "Beauty Is Only Skin Deep"
13. "(I Know) I'm Losing You"
14. "All I Need"
15. "You're My Everything"
16. "(Loneliness Made Me Realize) It's You That I Need"
17. "I Wish It Would Rain"
18. "I Truly, Truly Believe"
19. "I Could Never Love Another (After Loving You)"
20. "Runaway Child, Running Wild"
21. "Ol' Man River"
22. "Try To Remember"
23. "The Impossible Dream"

=== Disc 2 ===
1. "I'm Gonna Make You Love Me"
2. "Please Return Your Love To Me"
3. "Cloud Nine"
4. "Don't Let The Joneses Get You Down"
5. "I Can't Get Next To You"
6. "Psychedelic Shack"
7. "Ball Of Confusion (That's What The World Is Today)"
8. "Funky Music Sho Nuff Turns Me On"
9. "I Ain't Got Nothin'"
10. "Just My Imagination (Running Away With Me)"
11. "Superstar (Remember How You Got Where You Are)"
12. "Mother Nature"
13. "Love Woke Me Up This Morning"
14. "Papa Was A Rollin' Stone"
15. "Masterpiece" (Whitfield)
16. "Shakey Ground" (Eddie Hazel, Al Boyd, Jeffrey Bowen)
17. "Power" (Angelo Bond, Berry Gordy Jr., Jean Mayer-Dailey)
18. "Sail Away" (Whitfield)
19. "Treat Her Like A Lady" (Otis Williams, Ali-Ollie Woodson)

== 1995 track listing ==
=== Disc 1 ===
1. "The Way You Do The Things You Do"
2. "I'll Be In Trouble"
3. "The Girl's Alright With Me"
4. "Girl (Why You Wanna Make Me Blue)"
5. "My Girl"
6. "It's Growing"
7. "What Love Has Joined Together"
8. "Who's Lovin' You"
9. "Since I Lost My Baby"
10. "You've Got to Earn It" (Robinson, Grant)
11. "Nobody But You" (Clarence Paul)
12. "My Baby"
13. "Don't Look Back"
14. "Ol' Man River" [live]
15. "Get Ready"
16. "Ain't Too Proud To Beg"
17. "You'll Lose A Precious Love"
18. "Beauty Is Only Skin Deep"
19. "(I Know) I'm Losing You"
20. "All I Need"
21. "You're My Everything"
22. "(Loneliness Made Me Realize) It's You That I Need"
23. "I Wish It Would Rain"
24. "I Could Never Love Another (After Loving You)"
25. "Please Return Your Love To Me"
26. "Lullaby Of Love" (Beatrice Verdi)
27. "The Impossible Dream"

=== Disc 2 ===
1. "Cloud Nine"
2. "I'm Gonna Make You Love Me"
3. "Runaway Child, Running Wild"
4. "Don't Let The Joneses Get You Down"
5. "I Can't Get Next To You"
6. "Psychedelic Shack"
7. "Ball Of Confusion (That's What The World Is Today)"
8. "Just My Imagination (Running Away With Me)"
9. "Superstar (Remember How You Got Where You Are)"
10. "Papa Was A Rollin' Stone"
11. "Masterpiece"
12. "Hey Girl (I Like Your Style)" (Whitfield)
13. "Let Your Hair Down" (Whitfield)
14. "Shakey Ground"
15. "A Song for You" (Leon Russell)
16. "Power"
17. "Standing On The Top" (Rick James)
18. "Treat Her Like a Lady"
19. "Lady Soul" (Mark Holden)
