= Greatest Hits (The Temptations album) =

Greatest hits album by the Temptations
- Released: November 16, 1966
- Recorded: 1964–1966
- Studio: Hitsville USA, Detroit
- Genre: Soul
- Length: 32:40
- Label: Gordy; GS 919
- Producer: Smokey Robinson and Norman Whitfield.

The Temptations chronology
Gettin' Ready (1966)	Greatest Hits (1966)	Temptations Live! (1967)

Singles from Greatest Hits
- 1. "Beauty Is Only Skin Deep" Released: August 4, 1966

Professional ratings
Review scores
Source	Rating
Allmusic	3/5 stars
Tom Hull	A+

Greatest Hits is a 1966 greatest hits album for the Temptations, released by the Gordy (Motown) label. It peaked at #5 on the Billboard 200 album chart and remained on the chart for 120 weeks. Included are popular Temptations hits such as "The Way You Do the Things You Do", "Get Ready", "Since I Lost My Baby", "My Baby", "Don't Look Back", and their signature #1 hit, "My Girl". One non-album single, "Beauty Is Only Skin Deep", is also included; it was a #3 hit in the summer and fall of 1966.

The album was included in Robert Christgau's "Basic Record Library" of 1950s and 1960s recordings, published in Christgau's Record Guide: Rock Albums of the Seventies (1981).

== Track listing ==
=== Side one ===
1. "The Way You Do the Things You Do" (Smokey Robinson, Robert Rogers) (lead singer: Eddie Kendricks)
2. "My Girl" (Robinson, Ronald White) (lead singer: David Ruffin)
3. "Ain't Too Proud to Beg" (Edward Holland, Jr., Norman Whitfield) (lead singer: David Ruffin)
4. "Don't Look Back" (Robinson, White) (lead singer: Paul Williams)
5. "Get Ready" (Robinson) (lead singer: Eddie Kendricks)
6. "Beauty Is Only Skin Deep" (Holland, Whitfield) (lead singer: David Ruffin)

=== Side two ===
1. "Since I Lost My Baby" (Warren Moore, Robinson) (lead singer: David Ruffin)
2. "The Girl's Alright with Me" (Holland, Eddie Kendricks, Whitfield) (lead singer: Eddie Kendricks)
3. "My Baby" (Moore, Robinson, Rogers) (lead singer: David Ruffin)
4. "It's Growing" (Moore, Robinson) (lead singer: David Ruffin)
5. "I'll Be in Trouble" (Robinson) (lead singers: Eddie Kendricks, Melvin Franklin)
6. "Girl (Why You Wanna Make Me Blue)" (Holland, Whitfield) (lead singer: Eddie Kendricks)

== Chart and singles history ==
Chart (1966)	Peak position
U.S. Billboard Pop Albums	5
U.S. Top R&B Albums	1

Singles

Title	Information	US	US R&B	UK
"Beauty Is Only Skin Deep"	Gordy single 7055, August 4, 1966; B-side: "You're Not an Ordinary Girl" (from Gettin' Ready)	3	1	18

Year-end charts

Chart (1967)	Peak position
U.S. Top R&B Albums	1

== See also ==
- List of number-one R&B albums of 1966 (U.S.)
- List of number-one R&B albums of 1967 (U.S.)
- Greatest Hits, Vol. 2
