= Temptations Live! =

Live album by The Temptations
- Released: March 6, 1967
- Recorded: October 3, 1966
- Venue: The Roostertail's Upper Deck, Detroit, Michigan
- Genre: Soul
- Length: 47:45
- Label: Gordy; GS 921
- Producer: N/A

The Temptations chronology
Greatest Hits (1966)	Temptations Live! (1967)	The Temptations with a Lot o' Soul (1967)

Professional ratings
Review scores
Source	Rating
Allmusic	3/5 stars

Temptations Live! is the first live album to be released by The Temptations. The album was recorded on October 3, 1966, at the Roostertail in Detroit, Michigan. The album cover photograph was taken in March 1966 at The 20 Grand, 14th and Warren in Detroit, Michigan, and the album was released on Gordy (Motown) Records in 1967. The album features David Ruffin, Paul Williams, Eddie Kendricks, Melvin Franklin, and Otis Williams performing their regular live repertoire for a highly receptive crowd mostly consisting of young women. Included in the set are Temptations hits such as "My Girl", "My Baby", "Get Ready", "Ain't Too Proud to Beg", "Don't Look Back", and the group's then-current single, "Beauty Is Only Skin Deep". Out of the several live albums the group recorded during their career, this is the only one to feature David Ruffin. The album remained on the Billboard pop albums chart for 51 weeks, peaking at number 10.

== Track listing ==
Superscripts denote lead singers for each track: (a) David Ruffin, (b) Eddie Kendricks, (c) Paul Williams, (d) Melvin Franklin.

=== Side one ===
1. Intro by Scott Regen – 0:03
2. Medley – 4:49
  1. "Girl (Why You Wanna Make Me Blue)" (Norman Whitfield, Edward Holland Jr.) ^{b}
  2. "The Girl's Alright with Me" (Whitfield, Holland, Eddie Kendricks) ^{b}
  3. "I'll Be in Trouble" (Smokey Robinson) ^{b}
  4. "I Want a Love I Can See" (Robinson) ^{c, a}
3. "What Love Has Joined Together" (Robinson, Robert Rogers) – 3:01 ^{b}
4. "My Girl" (Robinson, Ronnie White) – 3:08 ^{a}
5. ""Yesterday"/"What Now My Love" (Lennon–McCartney, Gilbert Bécaud, Pierre Delano, Carl Sigman) – 3:08 ^{a, d}
6. "Beauty Is Only Skin Deep" (Whitfield, Holland) – 2:23 ^{a}
7. Group Introduction – 0:49
8. "I Wish You Love" (Albert Beach, Charles Trenet) – 1:52 ^{b}
9. "Ain't Too Proud to Beg" (Whitfield, Holland) – 2:57 ^{a}

=== Side two ===
1. "Old Man River" (Jerome Kern, Oscar Hammerstein II) – 4:44 ^{d}
2. "Get Ready" (Robinson) – 2:10 ^{b}
3. "Fading Away" (Robinson, Rogers, Warren Moore) – 1:55 ^{b}
4. "My Baby" (Robinson, Rogers, Moore) – 2:10 ^{a}
5. "You'll Lose a Precious Love" (Robinson) – 2:50 ^{a}
6. "Baby, Baby I Need You" (Robinson) – 1:50 ^{c, b}
7. "Don't Look Back" (Robinson, White) – 7:07 ^{c}

=== Compact disc bonus track ===
1. "The Way You Do the Things You Do" (Robinson, Rogers) – 3:24 ^{b}

== Personnel ==
- The Temptations – Eddie Kendricks, David Ruffin, Paul Williams, Otis Williams, and Melvin Franklin (David English)
- The Temptations Band:
  - Cornelius Grant – guitar, musical director
  - Bill Upchurch – bass
  - "Stormin" Norman Roberts – drums
- Johnny Trudell's Horn Section:
  - Johnny Trudell, Maurice Davis, and Floyd Jones or Billy Homer – trumpets
  - Don White and George Bohanon – trombones
  - Ted Buckner and Ernie Rogers – alto saxophones;
  - George Benson and Angelo Carlisi – tenor saxophones;
  - Thomas "Beans" Bowles – baritone saxophone, flute
- Scott Regen – M.C.

== See also ==
- List of Billboard number-one R&B albums of the 1960s
