= 20th Century Masters – The Millennium Collection: The Best of The Temptations, Volume 1 – The '60s =

Compilation album by The Temptations
- Released: August 31, 1999
- Genres: R&B
- Length: 30:18
- Label: Motown
- Producer: Harry Weinger

20th Century Masters – The Millennium Collection: The Best of The Temptations, Volume 1 – The '60s is a compilation album and part of the 20th Century Masters series released through Universal Music Group. It was released August 31, 1999. The collection spans the band's history from 1965 to 1969.

A follow up, 20th Century Masters: The Millennium Collection: Best of the Temptations, Vol. 2 - The '70s, '80s, '90s, was released in 2000.

== Critical reception ==
Professional ratings
Review scores
Source	Rating
AllMusic	3/5 stars

Stephen Thomas Erlewine of AllMusic writes, "Like most entries in Universal Music's Millennium Collection (previously the province of MCA Records), The Best of Temptations, Vol. 1: The '60s is a solid budget-line collection containing 11 of their biggest hits from the '60s."

== Track listing ==
No.	Title	Writer(s)	Original album	Length
1.	"My Girl"	William "Smokey" Robinson; Ronald White	The Temptations Sing Smokey (1965)	2:41
2.	"The Way You Do the Things You Do"	William "Smokey" Robinson; Bobby Rogers	Meet the Temptations (1964)	2:38
3.	"Beauty Is Only Skin Deep"	Eddie Holland; Norman Whitfield	Greatest Hits (1966)	2:21
4.	"Get Ready"	William "Smokey" Robinson	Gettin' Ready (1966)	2:37
5.	"Ain't Too Proud to Beg"	Eddie Holland; Norman Whitfield	Gettin' Ready	2:30
6.	"You're My Everything"	Cornelius Grant; Norman Whitfield; Rodger Penzabene	The Temptations with a Lot o' Soul (1967)	2:55
7.	"I'm Gonna Make You Love Me" (with Diana Ross & the Supremes)	Jerry Ross; Kenny Gamble; Leon Huff	Diana Ross & the Supremes Join the Temptations (1968)	3:05
8.	"Cloud Nine"	Barrett Strong; Norman Whitfield	Cloud Nine (1969)	3:28
9.	"(I Know) I'm Losing You"	Cornelius Grant; Eddie Holland; Norman Whitfield	The Temptations with a Lot o' Soul	2:26
10.	"I Wish It Would Rain"	Barrett Strong; Norman Whitfield; Rodger Penzabene	The Temptations Wish It Would Rain (1968)	2:46
11.	"I Can't Get Next to You"	Barrett Strong; Norman Whitfield	Puzzle People (1969)	2:51
Total length:				30:18

== Musicians ==
- The Temptations
  - Otis Williams
  - Melvin Franklin
  - Paul Williams
  - David Ruffin
  - Eddie Kendricks
  - Dennis Edwards

== Production ==
- Compilation Produced by Harry Weinger
- Digital Compiled and Mastered by Suha Gur and Kevin Reeves
- Production Coordination by Margaret Goldfarb
- Art direction: Vartan
- Design: Meire Murakami
- Photography courtesy of Motown Archives

Track information and credits adapted the album's liner notes.

== Charts ==
Chart (2012)	Peak position
US Billboard 200	73
US Top Catalog Albums (Billboard)	6

=== Year-end charts ===
Year-end chart performance for 20th Century Masters – The Millennium Collection: The Best of The Temptations, Volume 1 – The '60s
Chart (2002)	Position
Canadian R&B Albums (Nielsen SoundScan)	121
