= The Temptin' Temptations =

Studio album by the Temptations
- Released: November 1, 1965
- Recorded: March 1964 – August 1965
- Studios: Hitsville U.S.A., Detroit
- Genres: Soul, doo wop
- Length: 31:33
- Label: Gordy
- Producers: Smokey Robinson, William "Mickey" Stevenson, Ivy Jo Hunter, Norman Whitfield

The Temptations chronology
The Temptations Sing Smokey (1965)	The Temptin' Temptations (1965)	Gettin' Ready (1966)

Singles from The Temptin' Temptations
- 1. "Since I Lost My Baby" / "You've Got to Earn It" Released: June 1, 1965; 2. "My Baby" / "Don't Look Back" Released: September 30, 1965 (1st pressing), October 30, 1965 (2nd pressing)

Professional ratings
Review scores
Source	Rating
Allmusic	4.5/5 stars
Record Mirror	3/5 stars

The Temptin' Temptations is the third studio album by the Temptations for the Gordy (Motown) label released in 1965. The album includes several of the group's hits from 1965, and also includes a handful of singles that were not included on the Temptations' first 1965 album, The Temptations Sing Smokey. Among these are the 1964 singles "Girl (Why You Wanna Make Me Blue)" and "I'll Be in Trouble"; and the 1965 singles "Since I Lost My Baby", and "My Baby". Seven of the album's 12 tracks had previously been released as singles and their B-sides, though "My Baby" preceded the album only by a month.

== Overview ==
The three pre-"My Girl" singles all feature Eddie Kendricks on lead vocals. "I'll Be in Trouble" was written and produced by Smokey Robinson, while "Girl (Why You Wanna Make Me Blue)" was a Norman Whitfield production. Both songs were Top 40 hits for the group immediately following the success of their first hit, "The Way You Do the Things You Do". "The Girl's All Right With Me", "I'll Be in Trouble's" b-side, charted on its own at number 102, and was written by Kendricks, Whitfield, and Eddie Holland, but produced by Smokey Robinson and Whitfield.

"Since I Lost My Baby", a heartbroken ballad exemplary of Smokey Robinson's work, features David Ruffin on lead vocals, pining away for a lost lover even though the world around him is a relative nirvana. Longing and melancholy, "Since I Lost My Baby" (written by Robinson & fellow Miracle Pete Moore) tells a story about the pain of losing a lover. Temptations lead singer David Ruffin paints a picture as the song's narrator of an idyllic world where he has everything anyone could ask for, except for love. Contemporary R&B singer Luther Vandross would later cover the song on his 1982 album Forever, For Always, For Love.

"My Baby", an extension of the theme from "My Girl", features Ruffin and the Temptations bragging about the qualities of a special lady. It was written by Miracles members Robinson, Pete Moore, and Bobby Rogers .

"My Baby"'s B-side, the Paul Williams-led "Don't Look Back", was a hit in its own right, becoming a top 20 R&B hit and serving for several years as the Temptations' live-show closing number. It was also the original A-side of this recording, and as such, was performed by the group on The Ed Sullivan Show. It was later relegated to B-side status in the wake of "My Baby"'s bigger pop success at the time. However, today, "Don't Look Back" is the far more popular and better-remembered tune. Although the Temptations retired "Don't Look Back" from their repertoire following Williams' 1971 departure from the group, several cover versions have been recorded. These include versions by Al Green, Bobby Womack, The Persuasions, and Teena Marie, as well as a collaboration between Peter Tosh, Mick Jagger, and Keith Richards for Tosh's 1978 album Bush Doctor.

== Track listing ==
Side one

1. "Since I Lost My Baby" (Smokey Robinson, Pete Moore) (lead singer: David Ruffin) 2:55
2. "The Girl's Alright with Me" (Norman Whitfield, Edward Holland, Jr., Eddie Kendricks) (lead singer: Eddie Kendricks) 2:55
3. "Just Another Lonely Night" (Ivy Jo Hunter, William "Mickey" Stevenson) (lead singer: Paul Williams) 3:03
4. "My Baby" (Robinson, Moore, Bobby Rogers) (lead singer: David Ruffin) 3:06
5. "You've Got to Earn It" (Robinson, Cornelius Grant) (lead singer: Eddie Kendricks) 2:41
6. "Everybody Needs Love" (Whitfield, Holland) (lead singers: Eddie Kendricks, Melvin Franklin) 2:59

Side two

1. "Girl (Why You Wanna Make Me Blue)" (Whitfield, Holland) (lead singer: Eddie Kendricks) 2:23
2. "Don't Look Back" (Robinson, Ronnie White) (lead singer: Paul Williams) 2:56
3. "I Gotta Know Now" (Whitfield, Holland) (lead singer: Eddie Kendricks) 2:40
4. "Born to Love You" (Ivy Jo Hunter, William "Mickey" Stevenson) (lead singers: Eddie Kendricks, David Ruffin) 2:41
5. "I'll Be in Trouble" (Robinson) (lead singer: Eddie Kendricks; Melvin Franklin on last line of bridge) 3:00
6. "You're the One I Need" (Robinson) (lead singer: Eddie Kendricks; bridge vocals: David Ruffin and Paul Williams) 2:24

Unreleased recordings from The Temptin' Temptations sessions:

- "Come Back My Love" (Berry Gordy, Robert Gordy) (lead singer: Eddie Kendricks) - produced by Berry Gordy, Jr.
- "Nobody But You" (Clarence Paul, Sylvia Moy) (lead singer: Eddie Kendricks) - produced by Clarence Paul
- "That'll Be The Day" (Henry Cosby, Moy, Stevenson) (lead singer: David Ruffin) - produced by Henry Cosby & William "Mickey" Stevenson

These three songs have subsequently been released.

== Personnel ==
The Temptations

- David Ruffin – vocals (baritone/tenor/falsetto)
- Eddie Kendricks – vocals (tenor/falsetto)
- Paul Williams – vocals (second tenor/baritone)
- Melvin Franklin – vocals (bass)
- Otis Williams – vocals (second tenor/baritone)

with:

- The Andantes – additional backing vocals on "Just Another Lonely Night" and "That'll Be the Day"
- Jimmy Ruffin – additional backing vocals on "Born To Love You"

Producers

- Smokey Robinson – "Since I Lost My Baby", "The Girl's Alright with Me", "My Baby", "You've Got to Earn It", "Don't Look Back", "I'll Be in Trouble" and "You're the One I Need", Executive Producer
- Norman Whitfield – "The Girl's Alright with Me", "Everybody Needs Love", "Girl (Why You Wanna Make Me Blue)" and "I Gotta Know Now"
- William "Mickey" Stevenson and Ivy Jo Hunter – "Just Another Lonely Night" and "Born to Love You"

== Chart and singles history ==
Title	Information
"I'll Be in Trouble"	Gordy single 7032, April 29, 1964; B-side: "The Girl's Alright With Me"
"Girl (Why You Wanna Make Me Blue)"	Gordy single 7035, August 20, 1964; B-side: "Baby, Baby I Need You"
"Since I Lost My Baby"	Gordy single 7063, June 1, 1965; B-side: "You've Got to Earn It"
"My Baby"	Gordy single 7047, September 30, 1965; B-side: "Don't Look Back"

Name	Chart (1964–1965)	Peak position
The Temptin' Temptations	U.S. Billboard Pop Albums	11
The Temptin' Temptations	U.S. Top R&B Albums	1
"I'll Be in Trouble"	U.S. Billboard Pop Singles	33
"I'll Be in Trouble"	U.S. Cash Box R&B Singles Chart	22
"The Girl's Alright With Me"	U.S. Billboard Pop Singles	102
"The Girl's Alright With Me"	U.S. Cash Box R&B Singles Chart	39
"Girl (Why You Wanna Make Me Blue)"	U.S. Billboard Pop Singles	26
"Girl (Why You Wanna Make Me Blue)"	U.S. Cash Box R&B Singles Chart	11
"Since I Lost My Baby"	U.S. Billboard Pop Singles	17
"Since I Lost My Baby"	U.S. Billboard R&B Singles	4
"You've Got to Earn It"	U.S. Billboard Pop Singles	123
"You've Got to Earn It"	U.S. Billboard R&B Singles	22
"My Baby"	U.S. Billboard Pop Singles	13
"My Baby"	U.S. Billboard R&B Singles	4
"Don't Look Back"	U.S. Billboard Pop Singles	83
"Don't Look Back"	U.S. Billboard R&B Singles	15

- Note: There was no Billboard R&B singles chart from November 1963 until January 1965. Most discographies include R&B information from Cash Box magazine to fill in the gap in the R&B chart, as is done here with the 1964 releases.

== See also ==
- List of number-one R&B albums of 1965 (U.S.)
- List of number-one R&B albums of 1966 (U.S.)
