= Going Back (album) =

Studio album by Phil Collins
- Released: 13 September 2010
- Recorded: January 2009–June 2010
- Studios: Dinemec Studios, Geneva, Switzerland; The Farm, Chiddingfold, Surrey; New York City
- Genres: Pop; soul; R&B; Motown; rock
- Length: 57:16
- Label: Atlantic
- Producer: Phil Collins

Phil Collins chronology
Love Songs: A Compilation... Old and New (2004)	Going Back (2010)	Take a Look at Me Now: The Collection (2016)

Singles from Going Back
- 1. "(Love Is Like a) Heatwave" Released: 6 September 2010; 2. "Going Back" Released: 3 December 2010

2016 reissue cover
- The Essential Going Back cover

Going Back is the eighth studio album by the English singer-songwriter and drummer Phil Collins, released on 13 September 2010 by Atlantic Records. His first solo album in eight years, it features covers of 1960s Motown and soul standards.

Going Back made an impact on the charts worldwide, becoming a top five album in 16 countries. It became Collins's first UK number one studio album since 1993's Both Sides. Two editions were released; a standard edition with 18 tracks and a limited Ultimate Edition with 25 tracks and a DVD with various bonus content. Exclusive versions available on Amazon and iTunes were also available. Collins promoted the album with a seven-date tour in June and July 2010. Although Collins said Going Back was to be his final project with his retirement in 2011, he later resumed his career in 2015. Nevertheless, it remains his most recent studio work to date.

In 2016, Going Back was reissued as The Essential Going Back with fewer studio tracks, but additional live recordings and updated artwork.

== Background and recording ==
In October 2007, Collins finished commitments with Genesis with the Turn It On Again Tour. It was during the tour when Collins dislocated some vertebrae in his upper neck as a result from drumming, which affected his hands and the ability to play. In September 2009, Collins said that despite a successful subsequent operation on his neck, he did not regain full functionality of his hands, particularly his left, which made it "impossible for me to play drums or piano". Despite this setback, in the following month Collins announced his next studio album which was to feature 1960s Motown and soul standards covers, with the aim of having the tracks sounding "exactly like the originals". He asserted that the idea was not to "bring anything 'new' to these already great records, but to try to recreate the sounds and feelings that I had when I first heard them. My intention was to make an 'old' record, not a 'new' record". Collins had wanted to do such an album for many years, and was greatly influenced by his time watching former London-based group The Action perform the same tunes at The Marquee club. Collins called the album "a special case" and "almost like not part of Phil Collins' career", but deliberately chose it as his final solo album, which made it "a perfect circle" and "a beautiful journey" to end with music that he started off listening to. The album also marked the end of Collins's record deal with Atlantic Records.

The album originated in 2008 when Collins selected lesser known and "darker" Motown songs that he liked best as a youngster, and produced demos of them at his home studio in Geneva, Switzerland, using Cubase software. In late 2008, Collins approached Swiss audio engineer, producer, and mixer Yvan Bing, a former drummer who lived near Geneva, to help finalise the tracks and co-produce the album. The pair first met in New York City in 2006, when the two were working on the musical adaptation of Tarzan (1998). The first recording session took place in January 2009, and involved Collins playing along to the drum parts on his demos with a real kit to see if he could handle recording all the drums live. Collins brought in a kit that he had owned since 1964, and the session was the first time Collins sat at a kit since his operation, and had to tape his left hand to the drumstick to play. In addition to Geneva, the album was recorded at The Farm in Shalford, Surrey, and in New York City. Bing realised early into the project that using digital audio workstation was the ideal platform to recreate all the individual parts to the songs, and opted for Pro Tools, with the sound enhanced by analogue equipment.

The lead vocals on the album were taken from Collins's home demos, except a few re-recorded sections put down later. Collins enlisted musicians Bob Babbitt, Eddie Willis, and Ray Monette, who were part of The Funk Brothers and played on several Motown recordings from 1959 until 1972. Collins said to be able to have the surviving members involved "was unbelievable", and felt "a wave of happiness and wonder that this was actually happening to me" as he was performing with them on "(Love Is Like A) Heatwave". The overdubs for the 25 tracks were completed from 11 to 20 January 2010. Collins had his two youngest sons, Nicholas and Matthew, stomp their feet on the recording of "Jimmy Mack".

== Artwork ==
Until early 2010, the album was going to be called 18 Good Reasons with the album cover stylised to recall the Motown era. But the chance discovery of a photograph of 13-year-old Collins playing drums in the Getty Images library caused a change in direction, resulting in the album being called Going Back. Collins noted he actually had to pay for use of the picture of himself. The 2016 reissue of the album used a new photograph featuring a present-day Collins, rather than a remake of the original cover like the other reissues released that year.

== Release ==
On 10 April 2010 the first release of the recordings, "Too Many Fish in the Sea" was given free to new users who signed up to Collins's relaunched website. The title track, "Going Back" started to receive airplay in May and was streamed online on Collins's website soon after. "(Love Is Like a) Heat Wave" and "Going Back" were released as singles. On 31 July 2010, Atlantic Records unveiled the music video for "(Love Is Like a) Heatwave". On 24 August 2010, a music video for "Girl (Why You Wanna Make Me Blue)" was released on Collins's official YouTube channel.

Going Back debuted at No. 1 in the Dutch Albums Chart for the week ending 18 September 2010. The album also reached No. 1 on the UK Albums Chart for the week ending 23 September 2010. It was his first UK No. 1 in 12 years (...Hits) and his first UK No. 1 in 17 years (Both Sides) counting only albums with new material.

== Tour ==
Collins decided to perform a series of live shows in the summer to promote Going Back. "Up Close & Personal: Phil Collins Plays 60's Motown & Soul" was exclusively devoted to the music from the new album and were not part of an upcoming world tour. The first of these shows were announced on 14 April, to take place at New York's Roseland Ballroom for three nights from 23 to 25 June. Two nights in Philadelphia were then added to the list. On 29 April, it was confirmed that Collins was to be part of the opening night of 2010 Montreux Jazz Festival. Two days later, it was announced that Collins would perform a one-off show in London on 28 June 2010. This show was broadcast live on ITV1 18 September 2010.

Date	Venue/Title	City	Country
20 June	Electric Factory	Philadelphia	United States
21 June	Electric Factory	Philadelphia	United States
23 June	Roseland Ballroom	New York	United States
24 June	Roseland Ballroom	New York	United States
25 June	Roseland Ballroom	New York	United States
28 June	Phil Collins...For One Night Only	London	England
1 July	Montreux Jazz Festival	Montreux	Switzerland

Collins was supported by an 18-piece band for the brief six show tour. The band included Funk Brothers bassist Bob Babbitt, guitarists Eddie Willis & Ray Monette, Genesis touring musicians Daryl Stuermer on guitar and drummer Chester Thompson, a five-piece horn section, six back-up singers (Amy Keys, Lamont Van Hooke, Lynne Fiddmont-Linsey, Connie Jackson-Comegys, Terron Brooks and Bill Cantos), percussionist/vocalist Leslie Smith and keyboardist Brad Cole. Thompson had been drumming for Collins on tour for 34 years, but Collins stopped working with him after the final show in Montreux due to his dissatisfaction with Thompson's playing during the tour. Collins and Thompson have not reconciled or spoken to each other since the tour ended. "I was pretty upset. But I'm over it now. I wish him nothing but the best," said Thompson of the rift in 2021.

Andy Greene, of Rolling Stone, wrote of the final show in New York: "It's very hard not to come off like a glorified wedding band when you play a two-hour concert comprised entirely of Motown and soul covers, but last night in New York, Phil Collins pulled it off". At Montreux, record producer Quincy Jones appeared on stage to praise Collins as sounding as if he was from the "south side of Chicago", while Montreux festival founder Claude Nobs said: "He was magnificent. There was a lot of emotion and sincerity. And it's only the beginning of the festival."

== Reception ==
Professional ratings
Aggregate scores
Source	Rating
Metacritic	53/100
Review scores
Source	Rating
AllMusic	3/5 stars
Consequence of Sound	3/5 stars
Dotmusic	3/10
Los Angeles Times	2/4 stars
Mojo	3/5 stars
Now	2/5 stars
PopMatters	7/10
Record Collector	1/5 stars
Rolling Stone	3/5 stars
Uncut	4/10

Initial reception to the album was mixed, as Metacritic gave it a score of 53 out of 100. David Sheppard of BBC Music said "So faithfully have Collins and his confreres recreated the Sound of Young America – shimmering tambourines drowning out drums, bass compressed to a fat, distorted throb – that it's hard not to be swept along". The album was also featured as BBC Radio 2's "Album of the Week" on 4 September 2010. Martin Townsend of the Daily Express stated "You have to take your hat off to Phil Collins. Expressing the refreshingly modest desire to make an "old-sounding" album of cover versions the 59-year-old singer zips through a selection of mostly-Motown classics like 'Jimmy Mack' and 'Uptight' with the verve energy and wit of a man reborn."

Jack Foley of IndieLondon gave it 3 out of 5 stars, adding "The resulting album is as heartfelt and faithfully recreated as you might expect from an artist of Collins' calibre ..." Donald Gibson of the Seattle Post-Intelligencer said that "Going Back is an homage, plain and simple, with which Collins honors the songwriters, musicians, and vocalists who inspired him to pursue his own musical path as a young man." Graeme Thomson of Uncut was not so impressed, giving the album 2 stars out of 5 and stating "You can't fault the raw material, but Collins brings nothing new to these songs. If you have an overpowering desire to hear him gamely plough through renditions of 'Papa Was a Rollin' Stone' and 'Uptight', step aboard. For anyone else, Going Back is a heartfelt but pointless exercise in ersatz soul." Terry Staunton of Record Collector was even more negative, defining the album as a set "of 60s soul covers of baffling irrelevance" and wondering, "what possible use could anyone have for weedy-voiced faded Xeroxes of songs readily available in their wondrously uplifting original form?"

Ross Bennett of Mojo gave the album 3 stars out of 5 and wrote: "all are faithful reproductions of the originals. The likes of 'Uptight', 'Loving You Is Sweeter Than Ever' and 'Jimmy Mack' capture the exuberance of those '60s sides, but the slower ballads – particularly 'Blame It on the Sun' and a desperately cloying 'Never Dreamed You'd Leave in Summer' – are plain dreary." Legendary Motown songwriter and producer Lamont Dozier hailed Going Back; "Recording an album of Motown covers can be tricky, but I have to say this album has exceeded my expectations. Phil Collins has truly given us the real thing vocally, instrumentally, and production-wise... It's spectacular, making it impossible to pick a favorite because they're all masterfully done."

== Track listing ==
=== 2010 Standard Edition ===
All tracks are written by Holland–Dozier–Holland, except where noted.

No.	Title	Writer(s)	Length
1.	"Girl (Why You Wanna Make Me Blue)"	Norman Whitfield; Edward Holland Jr.	2:32
2.	"(Love Is Like a) Heatwave"		2:53
3.	"Uptight (Everything's Alright)"	Stevie Wonder; Sylvia Moy; Henry Cosby	3:03
4.	"Some of Your Lovin'"	Gerry Goffin; Carole King	3:19
5.	"In My Lonely Room"		2:25
6.	"Take Me in Your Arms (Rock Me for a Little While)"		2:59
7.	"Blame It on the Sun"	Wonder; Syreeta Wright	3:27
8.	"Papa Was a Rolling Stone"	Whitfield; Barrett Strong	6:44
9.	"Never Dreamed You'd Leave in Summer"	Wonder; Wright	2:59
10.	"Standing in the Shadows of Love"		2:42
11.	"Do I Love You"	Peter Anders; Phil Spector; Vincent Poncia Jr.	2:50
12.	"Jimmy Mack"		2:56
13.	"Something About You"		2:47
14.	"Love Is Here and Now You're Gone"		2:40
15.	"Loving You Is Sweeter Than Ever"	Ivy Jo Hunter; Wonder	2:48
16.	"Going to a Go-Go"	Warren "Pete" Moore; William "Smokey" Robinson Jr.; Robert Rogers; Marvin Tarplin	2:49
17.	"Talkin' About My Baby"	Curtis Mayfield	2:47
18.	"Going Back"	Goffin; King	4:36
Total length:			57:16

=== 2010 Ultimate Edition ===
No.	Title	Writer(s)	Length
1.	"Girl (Why You Wanna Make Me Blue)"	Whitfield; E. Holland	2:32
2.	"(Love Is Like a) Heatwave"		2:53
3.	"Uptight (Everything's Alright)"	Wonder; Moy; Cosby	3:03
4.	"Some of Your Lovin'"	Goffin; King	3:19
5.	"Ain't Too Proud to Beg"	Whitfield; E. Holland	2:42
6.	"In My Lonely Room"		2:25
7.	"Take Me in Your Arms (Rock Me for a Little While)"		2:59
8.	"Blame It on the Sun"	Wonder; Wright	3:27
9.	"Papa Was a Rolling Stone"	Whitfield; Strong	6:44
10.	"Never Dreamed You'd Leave in Summer"	Wonder; Wright	2:59
11.	"Standing in the Shadows of Love"		2:42
12.	"You've Been Cheatin'"	Mayfield	2:35
13.	"Don't Look Back"	Robinson; Ronald White	3:06
14.	"You Really Got a Hold on Me"	Robinson	3:07
15.	"Do I Love You"	Anders; Spector; Poncia	2:50
16.	"Jimmy Mack"		2:56
17.	"Something About You"		2:47
18.	"Love Is Here and Now You're Gone"		2:40
19.	"Loving You Is Sweeter Than Ever"	Hunter; Wonder	2:48
20.	"Ain't That Peculiar"	Moore; Robinson; Tarplin; White	3:05
21.	"Going to a Go-Go"	Moore; Robinson; Rogers; Tarplin	2:49
22.	"Nowhere to Run"		3:06
23.	"Talkin' About My Baby"	Mayfield	2:47
24.	"Dancing in the Street"	Hunter; William "Mickey" Stevenson; Marvin Gaye	2:44
25.	"Going Back"	Goffin; King	4:36
Total length:			1:17:35

iTunes has a digital download deluxe version in the "iTunes LP" HD format which contains 26 (of the 29) audio songs plus the music video for "(Love Is Like a) Heatwave". The "iTunes LP" HD format contains complete song lyrics and a digital photo gallery.

Ultimate edition

In addition to the expanded 25-track CD, the DVD contains four bonus tracks making it the complete Going Back session recordings. All 29 tracks can be transferred to a PC as either WAV or mp3 (320 kbit/s) files.

DVD bonus tracks

- "Too Many Fish in the Sea" (Whitfield/E. Holland) – 2:31
- "You Keep Me Hangin' On" (Holland–Dozier–Holland) (this track also an iTunes digital bonus track) – 2:58
- "Tears of a Clown" (Robinson/Wonder/Hank Cosby) – 3:00
- "Too Busy Thinking About My Baby" (Whitfield/Strong/Janie Bradford) – 3:07

All 29 tracks can be played with a different replica 7" vinyl record sleeve presented for each track.

DVD video materials

- Going Back ... The Home Movie – 87-minute documentary narrated by Phil Collins
- A Conversation With Phil Collins – 22-minute documentary includes on-camera Phil Collins interview plus behind-the-scenes and additional interviews with other participants.
- "(Love Is Like a) Heatwave" – music video
- "Going Back" – music video

A retailer-exclusive version of Going Back was offered at Best Buy in the U.S. This included an additional DVD containing a 30-minute interview with Collins. The DVD was packaged with the CD in a 2-disc jewel case, and was the only version of the album with a bonus disc sold at U.S. retail stores.

Collins recorded two of the extra tracks found on the "Ultimate Edition" DVD. "Tears of a Clown" was recorded as a B-side in 2002. In addition, he recorded "Too Busy Thinking About My Baby" as a duet with The Manhattan Transfer on their 1995 album Tonin'. Both tracks were newly recorded for Going Back.

=== 2016 reissue ===
The album was reissued as The Essential Going Back on 10 June 2016 with fewer tracks than the original release, but with the addition of "Too Many Fish in the Sea," and a bonus disc with live recordings. Just the first disc was included in the Take a Look at Me Now 8 album box set of the 2016 editions of Collins' solo albums

CD 1
No.	Title	Writer(s)	Length
1.	"Going Back"	Goffin; King	4:36
2.	"Girl (Why You Wanna Make Me Blue)"	Whitfield; E. Holland	2:32
3.	"(Love Is Like a) Heatwave"	Holland–Dozier–Holland	2:53
4.	"Some of Your Lovin'"	Goffin; King	3:19
5.	"Going to a Go-Go"	Moore; Robinson; Rogers; Tarplin	2:49
6.	"Papa Was a Rolling Stone"	Whitfield; Strong	6:44
7.	"Loving You Is Sweeter Than Ever"	Hunter; Wonder	2:48
8.	"Something About You"	Holland–Dozier–Holland	2:47
9.	"Talkin' About My Baby"	Mayfield	2:47
10.	"Do I Love You"	Anders; Spector; Poncia	2:50
11.	"Never Dreamed You'd Leave in Summer"	Wonder; Wright	2:59
12.	"Take Me in Your Arms (Rock Me for a Little While)"	Holland–Dozier–Holland	2:59
13.	"Too Many Fish in the Sea"	Whitfield; E. Holland	2:31
14.	"Uptight (Everything's Alright)"	Wonder; Moy; Cosby	3:03
Total length:			45:37

CD 2
No.	Title	Writer(s)	Length
1.	"Signed, Sealed, Delivered I'm Yours" (live)	Wonder; Lee Garrett; Wright; Lula Mae Hardaway	1:16
2.	"Ain't Too Proud to Beg" (live)	Whitfield; E. Holland	2:40
3.	"Girl (Why You Wanna Make Me Blue)" (live)	Whitfield; E. Holland	2:41
4.	"Dancing in the Street" (live)	Hunter; Stevenson; Gaye	2:43
5.	"(Love Is Like a) Heatwave" (live)	Holland–Dozier–Holland	3:20
6.	"Papa Was a Rolling Stone" (live)	Whitfield; Strong	7:27
7.	"Never Dreamed You'd Leave in Summer" (live)	Wonder; Wright	2:57
8.	"Talkin' About My Baby" (live)	Mayfield	3:11
9.	"Do I Love You" (live)	Anders; Spector; Poncia	3:12
10.	"Ain't That Peculiar" (live)	Moore; Robinson; Tarplin; White	3:30
11.	"Too Many Fish in the Sea" (live)	Whitfield; E. Holland	2:50
12.	"You Really Got a Hold on Me" (live)	Robinson	3:45
13.	"Something About You" (live)	Holland–Dozier–Holland	3:20
14.	"Uptight (Everything's Alright)" (live)	Wonder; Moy; Cosby	4:17
15.	"My Girl" (live)	Robinson; White	3:44
16.	"Going Back" (live)	Goffin; King	5:08
Total length:			56:09

== Personnel ==
- Phil Collins – lead vocals, backing vocals (1, 4, 7, 8, 10–13, 15–18), drums (1–8, 10–18), percussion (1–3, 5, 6, 8, 10–18), keyboards (1–3, 11, 14, 17, 18), acoustic piano (4, 5), bass guitar (4, 9, 11, 14), glockenspiel (5), electric piano (8), harp (8), handclaps (8), footstomps (12), guitars (14), organ (16), fingersnaps (18)
- Jason Rebello – vibraphone (5, 13), acoustic piano (6, 7, 12, 13, 15, 16), electric piano (7)
- Ray Monette – guitar (1–3, 5, 6, 8, 10, 12, 13, 15–17), wah-wah guitar (8)
- Eddie Willis – guitar (1–3, 5, 6, 8, 10, 12, 13, 15–18)
- Ronnie Caryl – acoustic guitar (7, 11)
- Bob Babbitt – bass guitar (1–3, 5–8, 10, 12, 13, 15–18)
- Graeme Blevins – tenor saxophone (1–3, 5, 6, 12–14, 16, 17), tenor sax solo (13, 16)
- Phil Todd – baritone saxophone (1–3, 5, 6, 12–17), flute (9), piccolo (10)
- John Aram – trombone (1–3, 5, 6, 12–14, 16, 17), handclaps (8), fingersnaps (18), horn arrangements and transcriptions
- Guy Barker – trumpet (1–3, 5, 6, 12–14, 16, 17), trumpet solo (8)
- Tom Rees-Roberts – trumpet (1–3, 5, 6, 12–14, 16, 17)
- Celeste-Marie Roy – bassoon (10)
- Steve Jones – handclaps (8), fingersnaps (18)
- Nicholas and Mathew Collins – handclaps (8), fingersnaps (18), footstomps (12), backing vocals (14)
- Scott Stroman – string arrangements and transcriptions, conductor
- Menuhin Academy – strings
- Connie Jackson-Comegys – backing vocals (2, 3, 5–7, 11, 12, 14)
- Lynne Fiddmont-Linsey – backing vocals (2, 3, 5–7, 11, 12, 14)

=== Production ===
- Produced by Phil Collins
- Engineered by Yvan Bing
- Assistant Engineers – Thoraya Binzagar and Thierry Chaunay
- Mixed by Yvan Bing and Phil Collins
- Mixed at Dinemec Studio
- Mastered by Kevin Reeves at Universal Mastering Studios-East.
- Artwork – Mike Hosey

== Charts ==
=== Weekly charts ===
Chart (2010)	Peak position
Australian Albums (ARIA)	3
Austrian Albums (Ö3 Austria)	3
Belgian Albums (Ultratop Flanders)	2
Belgian Albums (Ultratop Wallonia)	2
Canadian Albums (Billboard)	3
Czech Albums (ČNS IFPI)	2
Danish Albums (Hitlisten)	4
Dutch Albums (Album Top 100)	1
European Albums (Billboard)	1
Finnish Albums (Suomen virallinen lista)	41
French Albums (SNEP)	3
German Albums (Offizielle Top 100)	2
Greek Albums (IFPI)	6
Hungarian Albums (MAHASZ)	9
Irish Albums (IRMA)	10
Italian Albums (FIMI)	5
New Zealand Albums (RMNZ)	2
Norwegian Albums (VG-lista)	9
Polish Albums (ZPAV)	13
Portuguese Albums (AFP)	30
Scottish Albums (Official Charts)	4
Spanish Albums (Promusicae)	3
Swedish Albums (Sverigetopplistan)	3
Swiss Albums (Schweizer Hitparade)	4
UK Albums (Official Charts)	1
US Billboard 200	34

=== Year-end Charts ===
Chart (2010)	Position
Belgian Albums (Ultratop Flanders)	52
Belgian Albums (Ultratop Wallonia)	37
Dutch Albums (Album Top 100)	22
French Albums (SNEP)	37
German Albums (Offizielle Top 100)	13
New Zealand Albums (RMNZ)	38
Swedish Albums (Sverigetopplistan)	88
Swiss Albums (Schweizer Hitparade)	55
UK Albums (OCC)	53
Chart (2011)	Position
Austrian Albums (Ö3 Austria)	48

== Certifications ==
Region	Certification	Certified units/sales
Austria (IFPI Austria)	Gold	10,000^{*}
Belgium (BRMA)	Platinum	30,000^{*}
Brazil (Pro-Música Brasil)	Gold	20,000^{*}
Canada (Music Canada)	Gold	40,000^{^}
Denmark (IFPI Danmark)	Gold	15,000^{^}
France (SNEP)	Platinum	100,000^{*}
Germany (BVMI)	Platinum	200,000^{^}
New Zealand (RMNZ)	Gold	7,500^{^}
Poland (ZPAV)	Gold	10,000^{*}
Switzerland (IFPI Switzerland)	Gold	15,000^{^}
United Kingdom (BPI)	Gold	100,000^{^}
^{*} Sales figures based on certification alone.^{^} Shipments figures based on certification alone.

== Notes ==
- Cashmere, Paul (2009). "Phil Collins To Record Motown Covers Album". Undercover Media. Archived from the original on 21 November 2009.
- "Phil Collins Is "Going Back"" (Press release). Atlantic Records. 2010.
