= Lost and Found: You've Got to Earn It (1962–1968) =

Lost and Found: You've Got To Earn It (1962–1968)

Compilation album by The Temptations
- Released: September 28, 1999
- Recorded: 1962–1968
- Genre: Soul
- Length: 55:59
- Label: Motown; 012 153 366-2
- Producer: Smokey Robinson; Norman Whitfield; Ivy Jo Hunter; Johnny Bristol; Harvey Fuqua Frank Wilson; William "Mickey" Stevenson; Henry Cosby

Professional ratings
Review scores
Source	Rating
Allmusic	4/5 stars

Lost and Found: You've Got To Earn It (1962–1968) is a compilation album by The Temptations. Released by Motown Records in 1999, it includes twenty previously unreleased Temptations records alongside previously unreleased mixes of "Ain't Too Proud to Beg" and "You've Got to Earn It". Most of the songs were recorded during the group's "Classic 5" era with David Ruffin and Eddie Kendricks as lead singers, although there are some tracks present which were recorded with Ruffin's predecessor, Elbridge Bryant, in the lineup. There's also one track that was recorded with Ruffin's successor, Dennis Edwards.

== Overview ==
All three of the Temptations' predominant lead singers, David Ruffin, Eddie Kendricks, and Paul Williams, are featured on the album. Williams gives dramatic performances on songs such as "Last One Out is Brokenhearted", "Tear Stained Letter", and "I Now See You Clear Through My Eyes". Early-1960s recordings such as "Camouflage" [Version 1] and "My Pillow" show Kendricks at an early stage in his career. Later recordings like "No Time" and "Dinah" (later recorded as a solo track by David Ruffin) show Kendricks with the matured voice today familiar to the public. "What Am I Gonna Do Without You", "Only a Lonely Man Would Know", and "That'll Be The Day" are led by Ruffin.

The last studio recording on the album, "We'll Be Satisfied", includes all three singers on leads. This was a rare occasion for the group during this period, although co-led songs became more frequent in the Temptations' repertoire during their psychedelic period. The album closes with a live performance of "My Girl", which was performed a week after the studio version was recorded.

== Track listing ==
Superscripts denote lead singers for each track: (a) David Ruffin, (b) Eddie Kendricks, (c) Paul Williams, (d) Melvin Franklin, (e) Four-part harmony.

1. "What Am I Gonna Do Without You" ^{a} (Ivy Jo Hunter, Stevie Wonder)
2. "Happy Landing" ^{b, c, a, d} (Ronald White, William "Smokey" Robinson)
3. "Love Is What You Make It" ^{a} (William "Smokey" Robinson)
4. "No Time" ^{b} (William "Smokey" Robinson, Warren Moore)
5. "Last One Out Is Brokenhearted" ^{c} (Ivy Jo Hunter, William Stevenson)
6. "I Can't Think of a Thing At All" ^{c} (William "Smokey" Robinson)
7. "Camouflage" [Version 1] ^{b, d} (Berry Gordy)
8. "My Pillow" ^{b, d, e} (Robert Plaisted)
9. "Tear Stained Letter" ^{c} (Janie Bradford, Norman Whitfield)
10. "Forever in My Heart" ^{c} (William "Smokey" Robinson)
11. "You've Got to Earn It" [Alternate Version] ^{b} (Cornelius Grant, William "Smokey" Robinson)
12. "I Know She's Not a Mannequin" ^{a} (Harvey Fuqua, Johnny Bristol, Shena DeMell)
13. "Dinah" ^{b} (Al Cleveland, William "Smokey" Robinson)
14. "I Now See You Clear Through My Tears" ^{c} (William "Smokey" Robinson)
15. "Only a Lonely Man Would Know" ^{a} (Beatrice Verdi, Ivy Jo Hunter)
16. "Camouflage" [Version 2] ^{b, a} (Berry Gordy)
17. "Ain't Too Proud to Beg" [Alternate Version] ^{a} (Edward Holland Jr., Norman Whitfield)
18. "That'll Be the Day" ^{a} (Henry Cosby, Sylvia Moy, William Stevenson)
19. "We'll Be Satisfied" ^{c, b, a} (Frank Wilson, Marc Gordon)
20. "My Girl" [Live] ^{a} (Ronald White, William "Smokey" Robinson)

== Personnel ==
- Eddie Kendricks – vocals (tenor/falsetto)
- Paul Williams – vocals (tenor/baritone)
- Melvin Franklin – vocals (bass)
- Otis Williams – vocals (tenor/baritone)
- Elbridge "Al" Bryant – vocals (tenor/falsetto)
- David Ruffin – vocals (baritone/tenor/falsetto)
- Dennis Edwards – vocals (tenor)
- The Andantes background vocals (some tracks)
  - Jackie Hicks (contralto)
  - Marlene Barrow (mezzo-soprano)
  - Louvain Demps (soprano)
- The Funk Brothers – instrumentation
- Detroit Symphony Orchestra – strings

Production

- Berry Gordy – producer, executive producer
- Smokey Robinson – producer
- William "Mickey" Stevenson – producer
- Norman Whitfield – producer
- Ivy Jo Hunter – producer
- Johnny Bristol – producer
- Harvey Fuqua – producer
- Frank Wilson – producer
- William "Mickey" Stevenson – producer
- Henry Cosby – producer
