= Baby, Baby I Need You =

Single by The Temptations

from the album The Temptations Sing Smokey
- A-side: "Girl (Why You Wanna Make Me Blue)"
- Released: August 20, 1964
- Recorded: Hitsville USA (Studio A); September 13, September 30 and October 3, 1963
- Genre: Soul, R&B, Doo-wop
- Length: 2:46
- Label: Gordy; G 7035 B
- Songwriter: Smokey Robinson
- Producer: Smokey Robinson

The Temptations singles chronology
"I'll Be in Trouble" (1964)	"Girl (Why You Wanna Make Me Blue)" / "Baby, Baby I Need You" (1964)	"My Girl" (1964)

"Baby, Baby I Need You" is a 1963 song recorded by The Temptations for the Gordy (Motown) label. It was written by Smokey Robinson, and was later used as the B-side to their Top 40 1964 hit "Girl (Why You Wanna Make Me Blue)".

The song is about one's devotion to the one they love; it's narrator telling the girl he's falling for that if she let their “hearts combine” that he vows to always let her know how much he needs, wants, and loves her. A fusion of Gospel and Doo-Wop, the song is mostly an ensemble piece, with all the original members singing most of the song's lead vocal in unison (with Eddie Kendricks' higher falsetto voice making him the primary vocal in song). It is on the song's bridge and outro where Kendricks and Paul Williams each sing a few lead lines out front while Elbridge "Al" Bryant sings harmony vocals behind Kendricks and Williams (and throughout the song's bridge). All the group members get a chance to also be heard outfront when they sing the last word of each of the song's three verses in a five-part harmony (Bryant, Williams, Kendricks, Otis Williams, and Melvin Franklin respectively). This B-side is the last single released to feature Bryant's vocals (he was fired several months prior), and the last to feature Paul Williams' signing lead that would be released while he was still the group's main lead singer (although he would still record a few more leads). With the release of the single "My Girl", newest member David Ruffin would become The Tempts' new main lead (more or less replacing both Williams and Kendricks in the role).

Cash Box described the song as a "slow beat-ballad."

Although "Baby, Baby I Need You" did not chart nationally, the song was a regional smash hit in some parts of the country. It was a favorite of fans of the group (and the group itself) and became a part of the Temptations' onstage repertoire. The song was performed by the "classic five" members on the group's first live album, Temptations Live! where it received a standing ovation.

In 1966, The Wailers, featuring Bob Marley, covered the song (retitled "I Need You") which was released as a single and included on the 1966 compilation album, The Wailing Wailers. The Wailers also recorded a different song of the title "I Need You" in 1964, and so recent releases have retitled this cover as "I Need You So".

== Personnel ==
- Lead & background vocals by Eddie Kendricks (verses; bridge), Paul Williams (verses; bridge), Al Bryant (verses; harmony vocals on bridge), Melvin Franklin (verses), and Otis Williams (verses)
- Instrumentation by The Funk Brothers
