= The History of Otis Redding =

Compilation album by Otis Redding
- Released: November 1967
- Genre: Soul
- Length: 31:35
- Label: Volt

Professional ratings
Review scores
Source	Rating
AllMusic	4.5/5 stars

The History of Otis Redding is the first of numerous compilations of Otis Redding songs, featuring hits from 1962 to early 1967. Released one month prior to Redding's death in December 1967, it was the final album (and only compilation album) issued during his lifetime.

== Track listing ==
Side one
No.	Title	Writer(s)	Original album	Length
1.	"I've Been Loving You Too Long"	Otis Redding/Jerry Butler	Otis Blue: Otis Redding Sings Soul	2:49
2.	"Try a Little Tenderness"	Jimmy Campbell/Reg Connelly/Harry Woods	The Otis Redding Dictionary of Soul	3:20
3.	"These Arms Of Mine"	Redding	Pain in My Heart	2:30
4.	"Pain In My Heart"	Naomi Neville	Pain in My Heart	2:22
5.	"My Lover's Prayer"	Redding	The Otis Redding Dictionary of Soul	3:00
6.	"Fa-Fa-Fa-Fa-Fa (Sad Song)"	Otis Redding/Steve Cropper	The Otis Redding Dictionary of Soul	2:37

Side two
No.	Title	Writer(s)	Original album	Length
7.	"Respect"	Redding	Otis Blue: Otis Redding Sings Soul	2:06
8.	"Satisfaction"	Jagger/Richards	Otis Blue: Otis Redding Sings Soul	2:43
9.	"Mr. Pitiful"	Otis Redding/Steve Cropper	The Great Otis Redding Sings Soul Ballads	2:28
10.	"Security"	Redding	Pain in My Heart	2:30
11.	"I Can't Turn You Loose"	Redding	Volt single 130	2:35
12.	"Shake"	Sam Cooke	Otis Blue: Otis Redding Sings Soul	2:35

== See also ==
- List of Billboard number-one R&B albums of 1968
