= Gettin' Ready =

Studio album by the Temptations
- Released: June 15, 1966
- Recorded: October 1963 – January 1966
- Studio: Hitsville U.S.A., Detroit
- Genre: Soul; doo-wop
- Length: 31:33
- Label: Gordy
- Producer: Smokey Robinson; Norman Whitfield; William "Mickey" Stevenson; Ivy Jo Hunter; Robert Staunton; Robert Walker

The Temptations chronology
The Temptin' Temptations (1965)	Gettin' Ready (1966)	Greatest Hits (1966)

Singles from Gettin' Ready
- 1. "Get Ready" / "Fading Away" Released: February 7, 1966; 2. "Ain't Too Proud to Beg" Released: May 3, 1966

Professional ratings
Review scores
Source	Rating
AllMusic	4/5 stars
The Rolling Stone Album Guide	4/5 stars

Gettin' Ready is the fourth studio album by the Temptations for the Gordy (Motown) label released in 1966. It marks the transition of the group from having Smokey Robinson as its main producer, with new producer Norman Whitfield taking over Robinson's position. Two #1 R&B hit singles, one from each producer, are included: "Get Ready" from Robinson with Eddie Kendricks on lead, and "Ain't Too Proud to Beg" from Whitfield with David Ruffin on lead. Also included is the original version of "Too Busy Thinking About My Baby," which would be rerecorded as a hit for Marvin Gaye in 1969. The album was also one of the last albums to contain tracks co-authored by members of the group until the release of The Temptations Do The Temptations (1976). As with previous Temptations albums, several songs are written by members of The Miracles: Smokey Robinson, Bobby Rogers, Pete Moore, Ronnie White, and Marv Tarplin.

== Track listing ==
=== Side one ===
1. "Say You" (Charles Jones, Robert Dobyne, Robert Staunton) (lead singers: David Ruffin, Melvin Franklin)* 2:33
2. "Little Miss Sweetness" (Smokey Robinson) (lead singer: David Ruffin) 3:12
3. "Ain't Too Proud to Beg" (Edward Holland, Jr., Norman Whitfield) (lead singer: David Ruffin) 2:36
4. "Get Ready" (Robinson) (lead singer: Eddie Kendricks; adlibs: Melvin Franklin) 2:44
5. "Lonely, Lonely Man Am I" (Holland, Eddie Kendricks, Whitfield) (lead singers: Paul Williams, Melvin Franklin) 2:37
6. "Too Busy Thinking About My Baby" (Janie Bradford, Barrett Strong, Whitfield) (lead singer: Eddie Kendricks) 2:41

=== Side two ===
1. "I've Been Good to You" (Robinson) (lead singer: Eddie Kendricks, Melvin Franklin) 3:04
2. "It's a Lonely World Without Your Love" (Ivy Jo Hunter, William "Mickey" Stevenson) (lead singer: Eddie Kendricks) 2:36
3. "Fading Away" (Pete Moore, Robinson, Bobby Rogers) (lead singer: Eddie Kendricks) 2:41
4. "Who You Gonna Run To" (Robinson) (lead singer: Paul Williams) 3:12
5. "You're Not an Ordinary Girl" (Moore, Robinson, Rogers, Marv Tarplin, Ronnie White) (lead singer: Eddie Kendricks) 2:54
6. "Not Now (I'll Tell You Later)" (Robinson, Otis Williams)*** (lead singers: Eddie Kendricks, Elbridge Bryant, Melvin Franklin) 2:59

=== 1998 CD reissue bonus tracks ===
1. "Give It Up" ** (Sylvester Potts, Mary Wells) (lead singer: Paul Williams) 2:21
2. "The Man Who Don't Believe In Love" ** (Marv Johnson) (lead singer: Paul Williams) 2:27

Notes

- (*) in mono
- (**) bonus tracks for compact disc re-release, unreleased tracks dating from the Elbridge Bryant era of the early 1960s.
- (***) Recorded in mid 1963 during the Elbridge Bryant era with The Supremes as background vocals.

== Personnel ==
=== The Temptations ===
- David Ruffin – vocals
- Eddie Kendricks – vocals
- Paul Williams – vocals
- Melvin "Blue" Franklin – vocals
- Otis Williams – vocals
- Elbridge "Al" Bryant – vocals
- The Andantes – backing vocals ("Get Ready")
- The Supremes – backing vocals ("Not Now, I'll Tell You Later")
- The Funk Brothers – instrumentation
- Detroit Symphony Orchestra – instrumentation (some tracks)

=== Producers ===
- Smokey Robinson – "Little Miss Sweetness", "Get Ready", "I've Been Good to You", "Fading Away", "Who You Gonna Run Two", "You're Not an Ordinary Girl" and "Not Now, I'll Tell You Later", Executive Producer
- Norman Whitfield – "Ain't Too Proud to Beg", "Lonely, Lonely Man Am I" and "Too Busy Thinking About My Baby", Executive Producer
- Robert Staunton and Robert Walker, producers – "Say You"
- William "Mickey" Stevenson and Ivy Jo Hunter – "It's A Lonely World Without Your Love"
- Sylvester Potts (of The Contours) – "Give It Up"
- Marv Johnson – "The Man Who Didn't Believe in Love"

== Charts ==
=== Singles ===
Title	Information	US	US R&B
"Get Ready"	Gordy single 7049, February 7, 1966; B-side: "Fading Away"	29	1
"Ain't Too Proud to Beg"	Gordy single 7054, May 3, 1966; B-side: "You'll Lose A Precious Love" (recorded 1964; from The Temptations Sing Smokey)	13	1
"You're Not an Ordinary Girl" (b-side of "Beauty Is Only Skin Deep") (from Greatest Hits)	Gordy single 7055, August 4, 1966	-	-
"I've Been Good to You" (b-side of "You're My Everything") (from With A Lot O' Soul)	Gordy single 7063, June 13, 1967	124	-

=== Weekly charts ===
Chart (1966)	Peak position
UK Albums (OCC)	40
US Billboard 200	12
US R&B Albums	1

== See also ==
- List of number-one R&B albums of 1966 (U.S.)
