= List of Billboard number-one R&B albums of the 1960s =

These are the albums that reached number-one on the Billboard R&B Albums chart during the 1960s. The chart debuted in the issue dated January 30, 1965.

== Chart history ==
Issue date	Album	Artist(s)	Weeks at No. 1
1965
January 30	Where Did Our Love Go	The Supremes	1
February 6	Sam Cooke at the Copa	Sam Cooke	3
February 27	Shake	Sam Cooke	4
March 27	People Get Ready	The Impressions	2
April 10	The Temptations Sing Smokey	The Temptations	18
July 3	Four Tops	The Four Tops	3
July 24	Shotgun	Jr. Walker & the All-Stars	1
September 11	The In Crowd	Ramsey Lewis Trio	12
October 30	Otis Blue: Otis Redding Sings Soul	Otis Redding	1
December 11	The Temptin' Temptations	The Temptations	15
1966
January 15	Going to a Go-Go	Smokey Robinson and The Miracles	4
April 23	I Hear a Symphony	The Supremes	1
April 30	Got My Mojo Workin'	Jimmy Smith	2
May 14	Crying Time	Ray Charles	1
May 21	Lou Rawls Live!	Lou Rawls	12
July 30	Gettin' Ready	The Temptations	6
August 20	Hold On, I'm Comin'	Sam and Dave	1
October 1	Soulin'	Lou Rawls	9
October 22	The Supremes A' Go-Go	The Supremes	4
December 31	Greatest Hits	The Temptations	9
1967
February 4	Four Tops Live	Four Tops	1
March 11	The Supremes Sing Holland–Dozier–Holland	The Supremes	3
April 1	Mercy, Mercy, Mercy! Live at 'The Club'	Julian "Cannonball" Adderley	1
April 8	Temptations Live!	The Temptations	3
April 29	I Never Loved a Man the Way I Love You	Aretha Franklin	14
July 15	Revenge	Bill Cosby	2
July 29	Here Where There Is Love	Dionne Warwick	2
September 2	The Temptations with a Lot o' Soul	The Temptations	1
September 9	Aretha Arrives	Aretha Franklin	5
October 14	Greatest Hits	Diana Ross and The Supremes	12
1968
January 6	The Temptations in a Mellow Mood	The Temptations	7
February 24	The History of Otis Redding	Otis Redding	1
March 2	Lady Soul	Aretha Franklin	16
April 20	The Dock of the Bay	Otis Redding	3
June 22	The Temptations Wish It Would Rain	The Temptations	2
July 27	Aretha Now	Aretha Franklin	17
September 14	The Temptations Wish It Would Rain	The Temptations	1
November 23	Hickory Holler Revisited	O. C. Smith	1
December 7	Special Occasion	Smokey Robinson and The Miracles	2
December 21	Diana Ross & the Supremes Join The Temptations	Diana Ross and The Supremes and The Temptations	4
1969
January 18	TCB	Diana Ross and The Supremes and The Temptations	6
March 1	Soul '69	Aretha Franklin	4
March 29	Cloud Nine	The Temptations	13
June 21	M.P.G.	Marvin Gaye	2
July 12	My Whole World Ended	David Ruffin	2
July 26	Aretha's Gold	Aretha Franklin	4
August 23	Hot Buttered Soul	Isaac Hayes	10
November 1	Puzzle People	The Temptations	15

== See also ==
- 1960s in music
- List of Billboard number-one rhythm and blues hits
