= The Temptations Sing Smokey =

Studio album by the Temptations
- Released: March 22, 1965
- Recorded: September 1963 – March 1965
- Studio: Hitsville U.S.A., Detroit
- Genre: Soul; rhythm and blues
- Length: 33:21
- Label: Gordy
- Producer: Smokey Robinson

The Temptations chronology
Meet the Temptations (1964)	The Temptations Sing Smokey (1965)	The Temptin' Temptations (1965)

Singles from The Temptations Sing Smokey
- 1. "My Girl" Released: December 21, 1964; 2. "It's Growing" Released: March 18, 1965

Professional ratings
Review scores
Source	Rating
AllMusic	4.5/5 stars
Entertainment Weekly	(A)

The Temptations Sing Smokey is the second studio album by the Temptations for the Motown label, released on the Gordy Records subsidiary (G 912) in 1965. As its name implies, it is composed entirely of songs written and produced by Smokey Robinson, and several other members of the Miracles as well.

Several of the songs are covers of songs Robinson produced for the Miracles or Mary Wells, while the rest were originally recorded by The Temptations. Among these are three successful hit singles, starting with "The Way You Do the Things You Do", which featured Eddie Kendricks on lead vocals. The next two songs feature lead vocals by new Temptation David Ruffin – "It's Growing" and the group's signature song, "My Girl".

Not included are two singles which predate these two singles, "I'll Be in Trouble" and "Girl (Why You Wanna Make Me Blue)" (whose B-side, "Baby, Baby I Need You", is here). These songs would be included on the next Temptations album, The Temptin' Temptations. A third hit single, "The Way You Do the Things You Do", is present here, although it was also issued on the previous Temptations album, Meet the Temptations.

== Track listing ==
Side 1
No.	Title	Writer(s)	Lead vocalist	Length
1.	"The Way You Do the Things You Do"	Smokey Robinson, Bobby Rogers	Eddie Kendricks	2:41
2.	"Baby, Baby I Need You"	Robinson	Eddie Kendricks, Paul Williams, Temptations ensemble	2:53
3.	"My Girl"	Robinson, Ronald White	David Ruffin	2:55
4.	"What Love Has Joined Together"	Robinson, Rogers	Eddie Kendricks	2:58
5.	"You'll Lose a Precious Love"	Robinson	David Ruffin; Melvin Franklin on last line of bridge	2:35
6.	"It's Growing"	Robinson, Warren Pete Moore	David Ruffin	3:00

Side 2
No.	Title	Writer(s)	Lead vocalist	Length
7.	"Who's Lovin' You"	Robinson	David Ruffin	2:59
8.	"What's So Good About Goodbye"	Robinson	Eddie Kendricks	2:40
9.	"You Beat Me to the Punch"	Robinson, White	Paul Williams	2:45
10.	"Way Over There"	Berry Gordy, Jr., Robinson	Eddie Kendricks	3:03
11.	"You've Really Got a Hold on Me"	Robinson	Eddie Kendricks; co-lead harmonies: David Ruffin, Paul Williams	3:00
12.	"(You Can) Depend on Me"	Gordy, Robinson	Eddie Kendricks, Otis Williams	2:32

Outtakes
No.	Title	Writer(s)	Lead vocalist	Length
1.	"What's Easy for Two Is So Hard for One"	Robinson	Paul Williams
2.	"Happy Landing"	Robinson, White	Eddie Kendricks

Both these songs have subsequently been released.

== Personnel ==
The Temptations

- David Ruffin – vocals (all tracks except "Baby, Baby I Need You")
- Eddie Kendricks – vocals
- Paul Williams – vocals
- Melvin Franklin – vocals
- Otis Williams – vocals
- Elbridge "Al" Bryant – vocals ("Baby, Baby I Need You")

with:

- The Andantes – additional backing vocals ("It's Growing")
- The Funk Brothers – instrumentation
- Detroit Symphony Orchestra – strings

Technical

- Smokey Robinson – producer, executive producer
- Bob Folster – cover design

== Chart and singles history ==
Title	Information
"The Way You Do the Things You Do"	Gordy single 7028, January 23, 1964; B-side – "Just Let Me Know" (recorded 1963; from Meet The Temptations)
"Baby, Baby I Need You" (recorded 1963; b-side of "Girl (Why You Wanna Make Me Blue)")	Gordy single 7035, August 20, 1964
"My Girl"	Gordy single 7038, December 21, 1964; B-side – "(Talking 'Bout) Nobody But My Baby" (non album side)
"It's Growing"	Gordy single 7040, March 18, 1965; B-side – "What Love Has Joined Together"
"You'll Lose a Precious Love" (b-side of "Ain't Too Proud to Beg")	Gordy single 7057, May 3, 1966

Name	Chart (1964–1965)	Peak position
The Temptations Sing Smokey	U.S. Billboard Pop Albums	35
The Temptations Sing Smokey	U.S. Top R&B Albums	1
"The Way You Do the Things You Do"	U.S. Billboard Pop Singles	11
"The Way You Do the Things You Do"	U.S. CashBox R&B Singles	1
"Baby, Baby I Need You"	U.S. Billboard Pop Singles	-
"My Girl"	U.S. Billboard Pop Singles	1
"My Girl"	U.S. Billboard R&B Singles	1
"It's Growing"	U.S. Billboard Pop Singles	18
"It's Growing"	U.S. Billboard R&B Singles	3
"What Love Has Joined Together"	U.S. Billboard Pop Singles	
"What Love Has Joined Together"	U.S. Billboard R&B Singles	

- Note – There was no Billboard R&B singles chart from November 1963 until January 1965. Most discographies include R&B information from Cash Box magazine to fill in the gap in the R&B chart, as is done here with the 1964 releases.

== See also ==
- List of number-one R&B albums of 1965 (U.S.)
