= You've Got to Earn It =

Single by The Temptations

from the album The Temptin' Temptations
- A-side: "Since I Lost My Baby"
- Released: June 1, 1965
- Recorded: Hitsville USA (Studio A); June 12 and August 18, 1964
- Genre: Soul
- Length: 2:42
- Label: Gordy; G 7043
- Songwriter(s): Smokey Robinson; Cornelius Grant
- Producer(s): Smokey Robinson

The Temptations singles chronology
"It's Growing" (1965)	"Since I Lost My Baby" / "You've Got to Earn It" (1965)	"My Baby" / "Don't Look Back" (1965)

"You've Got to Earn It" is a 1964 song recorded by the Temptations for the Gordy (Motown) label. It was released as the B-side to their 1965 Top 40 hit "Since I Lost My Baby", and was also able to chart on its own, peaking at number 23 on the Billboard Bubbling Under Hot 100 Pop Charts. On Billboard's R&B singles chart, "You've Got to Earn It" peaked at number 22. It was written by Miracles lead singer Smokey Robinson, who also was the song’s producer, and the group’s main guitarist, Cornelius Grant. Grant did not play guitar on the song as he was out on tour during the recording session.

Cash Box described it as a "rhythmic, hand-clappin’ happy-go-lucky romancer."

== Personnel ==
- Lead vocals by Eddie Kendricks
- Background vocals by Melvin Franklin, Paul Williams, David Ruffin, and Otis Williams
- Instrumentation by the Funk Brothers

== Chart history ==
Chart (1965)	Peak position
U.S. Billboard Bubbling Under the Hot 100	123
U.S. Billboard R&B Singles	22
