= The Girl's Alright with Me =

"The Girl's Alright With Me"

Single by the Temptations

from the album The Temptin' Temptations
- A-side: "I'll Be in Trouble"
- Released: April 29, 1964
- Recorded: Hitsville USA (Studio A); March 26, 1964
- Genre: Soul, R&B
- Length: 2:50
- Label: Gordy; G 7032
- Songwriter(s): Norman Whitfield; Edward Holland Jr. and Eddie Kendricks
- Producer(s): Norman Whitfield

The Temptations singles chronology
"The Way You Do the Things You Do" (1964)	"I'll Be in Trouble" / "The Girl's Alright with Me" (1964)	"Girl (Why You Wanna Make Me Blue)" (1964)

"The Girl's Alright with Me" is a 1964 song recorded by the Temptations for the Gordy (Motown) label. The B-side to their Top 40 hit "I'll Be in Trouble", the song was also able to chart on its own, peaking at number 102 on Billboard Pop Charts. It was written by Eddie Kendricks, Norman Whitfield, and Eddie Holland, and produced by Whitfield. Whitfield would rerecord the song with his act The Undisputed Truth some ten years later for their album Down To Earth.

Cash Box described it as "an engaging, easy-beat thumper that the crew serves up in tempting style."

== Personnel ==
- Lead vocals by Eddie Kendricks
- Background vocals by Melvin Franklin, Paul Williams, David Ruffin, and Otis Williams
- Instrumentation by The Funk Brothers

== Chart history ==
Chart (1964)	Peak position
U.S. Billboard Bubbling Under the Hot 100	102
U.S. Cash Box R&B Singles Chart	39
