= Don't Look Back (The Temptations song) =

1965 single by the Temptations

- Japanese release picture sleeve

Single by The Temptations

from the album The Temptin' Temptations
- A-side: "My Baby"
- Released: September 30, 1965 (1st pressing); October 30, 1965 (2nd pressing)
- Recorded: Hitsville USA (Studio A); May 5, May 10 and May 12, 1965
- Genre: Soul
- Length: 2:50
- Label: Gordy; G 7047
- Songwriters: Smokey Robinson; Ronald White
- Producer: Smokey Robinson

The Temptations singles chronology
"Since I Lost My Baby" (1965)	"My Baby" / "Don't Look Back" (1965)	"Get Ready" (1966)

Music video
- "Don't Look Back" on YouTube

"Don't Look Back" is a 1965 song recorded by The Temptations for the Gordy (Motown) label. The flip side to their Top 20 hit "My Baby", "Don't Look Back" broke out and became a hit among the R&B audience on its own, reaching #14 on the R&B charts.

Considered one of original lead singer Paul Williams' showcases, "Don't Look Back" was regularly employed as the closing number for Temptations live performances. Although the original flip side, "My Baby", was initially more popular with pop audiences at the time, "Don't Look Back" became the more popular and enduring song over subsequent decades. It was also performed by the group on The Ed Sullivan Show.

== Background ==
Written by Miracles members Smokey Robinson and Ronald White, (who also co-wrote the group's #1 Pop smash, "My Girl") the previous year, "Don't Look Back" is a reassurance to the tentative that finding true love is worth the heartbreak and failed relationships it takes to reach it. As the song's narrator, Paul Williams, promises his lover, in his trademark gritty tone:

If you just put your hand in mine
We're gonna leave all your troubles behind
keep on walkin' and don't look back.

Smokey Robinson, the song's producer, specifically assigned Paul Williams to sing lead on the song. Although Williams had been the group's original lead singer during its formative years, his role had by 1965 been eclipsed by David Ruffin and Eddie Kendricks, who had both sung lead on Temptations hit singles. As such, Williams was often overlooked for leads, even on album tracks and B-sides.

"Don't Look Back" was originally this single's A-side, but was passed over by the nation's DJs in favor of the Ruffin-led "My Baby", which had a much bigger pop success than this song, and placed on the B-side. The song nevertheless was promoted as if it were an A-side and would be the only B-side to chart on the Billboard Hot 100 for the group (but missed the Top 40 as it peaked at #83).

Although the song's relatively modest initial chart success prevented Paul Williams from getting any more leads on Temptations singles releases, the fact is that "Don't Look Back" became a huge belated hit, because his dynamic performance of the song on the Temptations Live! LP received huge airplay by R&B DeeJays nationwide, and propelled sales of the album into the Top 10 of the Billboard pop album chart. Both sides of the single would receive a second pressing and the tracks remixed, with the following statements added on: "Taken from the album #G 914 The Temptin' Temptations." With the second printing, the sides were reversed, making "My Baby" the A-side, while "Don't Look Back", the original A-side, was relegated to B-side status.

Cash Box described the song as a "catchy, rhythmic ode about a twosome who seem aptly suited to each other."

"Don't Look Back" was retired from The Temptations' repertoire after Williams, suffering from complications of sickle-cell disease and alcoholism, left the group in 1971. The group performed the song at their induction to the Rock and Roll Hall of Fame as a tribute to Williams, along with Daryl Hall and John Oates, who announced the induction.

== Personnel ==
- Lead vocals by Paul Williams
- Background vocals by Eddie Kendricks, Melvin Franklin, David Ruffin, and Otis Williams
- Written by William "Smokey" Robinson and Ronald White
- Produced by Smokey Robinson
- Instrumentation by the Funk Brothers.

== Chart history ==
Chart (1965)	Peak position
U.S. Billboard Hot 100 Chart	83
U.S. Billboard R&B Singles	14

=== Peter Tosh and Mick Jagger version ===
"(You Gotta Walk And) Don't Look Back"

Single by Peter Tosh with Mick Jagger

from the album Bush Doctor
- B-side: "Soon Come"
- Released: 1978
- Genre: Reggae
- Length: 3:43
- Label: EMI
- Songwriters: William Robinson; Ronald White

Music video
- "(You Gotta Walk And) Don't Look Back" on YouTube

Peter Tosh scored a hit in 1978 with a reggae version of the song, sharing vocals with Mick Jagger. That version bore the modified title "(You Gotta Walk And) Don't Look Back". The song hit #1 in the Netherlands, #2 in Belgium, #20 in Australia, and #81 in the US. The song was also featured on the 2007 album Putumayo Presents World Hits starring Jagger and Tosh.

The track appears also on Peter Tosh 1978 album Bush Doctor with credited Mick Jagger vocals. The pair played the song together that year on an episode of Saturday Night Live and a couple of times during Tosh's opening performance on the Rolling Stones US Tour 1978. The Rolling Stones rehearsed it for that tour and played it once in Chicago 2002.

Tosh had previously recorded the song with The Wailers in ska style in 1966.

=== Dirk De Smet version ===
"Walk and Don't Look Back"

Single by Dirk De Smet
- Released: 2008
- Genre: R&B
- Label: Ariola / Sony Music(for distribution)
- Songwriters: Smokey Robinson; Ronald White

Music video
- "Walk and Don't Look Back" on YouTube

Dirk De Smet, the winner of the second series of the Belgian edition of X Factor musical competition made a remake of the song under the title "Walk and Don't Look Back" being his debut release after the win. It reached #4 on the Flemish Ultratop Belgian Singles Chart in 2008.

== Bibliography ==
- Williams, Otis and Romanowski, Patricia (1988, updated 2002). Temptations. Lanham, MD: Cooper Square. ISBN 0-8154-1218-5.
- Williams, Otis and Weigner, Harry (2002). My Girl: The Very Best of the Temptations (Compact disc liner notes). New York: Motown/Universal Records.
