= It's Growing =

1965 single by The Temptations

Single by The Temptations

from the album The Temptations Sing Smokey
- B-side: "What Love Has Joined Together"
- Released: March 18, 1965
- Recorded: Hitsville USA; 1964–1965
- Genre: R&B; pop
- Length: 3:01
- Label: Gordy; G 7040
- Songwriter(s): Smokey Robinson; Warren "Pete" Moore
- Producer(s): Smokey Robinson

The Temptations singles chronology
"My Girl" (1964)	"It's Growing" (1965)	"Since I Lost My Baby" (1965)

"It's Growing" is a 1965 hit single by The Temptations for the Gordy (Motown) label. Written by Miracles members Smokey Robinson and Pete Moore and produced by Robinson, the song was a top 20 pop single on the Billboard Hot 100 in the United States, on which it peaked at number 18. On Billboard's R&B singles chart, "It's Growing" peaked at number 3.

This single was the follow-up to "My Girl", which was the first to feature David Ruffin as the Temptations new lead singer. Ruffin, as the song's narrator, tells his lover that his love for her keeps on growing each and every day, giving several comparations to illustrate how much it grows. The song starts with a toy piano playing before the drums kick start the song, going into mid-tempo dance number. Motown had hoped to repeat the success of the previous single by giving "It's Growing" a somewhat similar sound but with a bigger orchestration and adding The Andantes for additional backing vocals.

This single, the second from The Temptations Sing Smokey, would be backed by the Eddie Kendricks-led cover of The Miracles' "What Love Has Joined Together." While not as successful as the previous single, it still made the Top 20 in the Pop charts, continuing Robinson's reign as the group's main producer. Cash Box described it as "a slow-shufflin’, pop-r&b rhythmic romancer about a twosome who seem aptly suited to each other."

== Other recordings ==
- Otis Redding would cover this song in 1966.
- Fellow Motown group The Contours recorded a version featuring Ruffin's eventual replacement Dennis Edwards in 1967.
- Bobby Taylor & the Vancouvers recorded a version that was released as the B-Side to the group's 1968 single "Malinda".
- Kate Taylor recorded the song - as "It's Growin'" - on her 1978 self-titled album, the track featuring James Taylor on guitar and background vocals. James himself remade the song for his 2008 album Covers, this version becoming an adult contemporary hit in 2008.
- Classic rock singer Paul Rodgers included his version of the song on his 2014 cover album of soul classics The Royal Sessions.

== Personnel ==
- Lead vocals by David Ruffin
- Background vocals by Eddie Kendricks, Melvin Franklin, Paul Williams, Otis Williams, and The Andantes: Jackie Hicks, Marlene Barrow and Louvain Demps
- Instrumentation by The Funk Brothers and the Detroit Symphony Orchestra (strings).

== Chart history ==
Chart (1965)	Peak position
U.S. Billboard Hot 100 Chart	18
U.S. Billboard R&B Singles	3
