= My Baby (The Temptations song) =

- Japanese release picture sleeve

Single by The Temptations

from the album The Temptin' Temptations
- B-side: "Don't Look Back"
- Released: September 30, 1965 (1st pressing); October 30, 1965 (2nd pressing)
- Recorded: Hitsville USA (Studio A); August 4 and August 11, 1965
- Genre: Soul, R&B, pop
- Length: 3:05
- Label: Gordy; G 7047
- Songwriters: Smokey Robinson; Robert Rogers; Warren Moore
- Producer: Smokey Robinson

The Temptations singles chronology
"Since I Lost My Baby" (1965)	"My Baby" / "Don't Look Back" (1965)	"Get Ready" (1966)

"My Baby" is a 1965 hit single recorded by the Temptations for the Gordy (Motown) label. Written by Miracles members Smokey Robinson, Bobby Rogers, and Pete Moore and produced by Robinson, the song was a top 20 pop hit in the United States, and a top 5 hit on the R&B charts.

An extension of the theme from the group's #1 hit "My Girl", which had been released the previous December, "My Baby" features The Temptations, with David Ruffin on lead, bragging about the qualities of a special lady. Ruffin praises his woman's hairstyles ("hair soft like a baby lamb/and I love to run my fingers through it") and personality ("the gold in her personality/could set Fort Knox to shame"), and hopes that "she digs me the way I am/but if I have to change/you know I'm gona do it for my baby".

Cash Box described the single as an "easy-going, pop-r&b romantic shuffler about a love-sick fella who’ll do anything for his girlfriend." "My Baby" was a notable attempt to create an uptempo danceable number for the Temptations; all of their previous Top 20 hits to this point had been either ballads or mid-tempo numbers. The single immediately following "My Baby", "Get Ready", followed the same plan, and was produced with an even faster tempo and a brassier arrangement.

Unusually for Temptations singles, "My Baby's" B-side, the Paul Williams-led "Don’t Look Back", was a minor hit in its own right, becoming a top 20 R&B hit and serving for several years as the Temptations' live-show closing number. Both sides of the single would be remixed for its 2nd pressing, adding on the following statements: "Taken from the album #G 914 The Temptin' Temptations."

== Personnel ==
- Lead Vocals by David Ruffin
- Background Vocals by Eddie Kendricks, Melvin Franklin, Paul Williams, and Otis Williams
- Written by William "Smokey" Robinson, Robert Rogers, and Warren Moore
- Produced by Smokey Robinson
- Instrumentation by the Funk Brothers

== Chart history ==
Chart (1965)	Peak position
U.S. Billboard Hot 100	13
U.S. Billboard R&B Singles	4
