= Since I Lost My Baby =

1965 single by The Temptations

Single by the Temptations

from the album The Temptin' Temptations
- B-side: "You've Got to Earn It"
- Released: June 1, 1965
- Recorded: May 5, May 10 and May 12, 1965
- Studio: Hitsville U.S.A. (Studio A)
- Genre: Pop; R&B
- Length: 2:51
- Label: Gordy
- Songwriters: Smokey Robinson; Warren Moore
- Producer: Smokey Robinson

The Temptations singles chronology
"It's Growing" (1965)	"Since I Lost My Baby" (1965)	"My Baby" (1965)

"Since I Lost My Baby" is a 1965 hit single recorded by the Temptations for the Motown Records' Gordy label. Written by the Miracles' members Smokey Robinson and Pete Moore and produced by Robinson, the song was a top 20 pop single on the Billboard Hot 100 in the United States, on which it peaked at number 17. On Billboard's R&B singles chart, "Since I Lost My Baby" peaked at number four.

== Background ==
Longing and melancholy, "Since I Lost My Baby" tells a story about the pain of losing a lover. Temptations lead singer David Ruffin, portrays the song's narrator, bass singer Melvin Franklin is also heard out front after each of Ruffin's first two lines on the first verse. It was Ruffin's third straight lead on a Temptations single.

Cash Box described it as a "tender, slow-shufflin’ pop-r&b tearjerker about a lad who has been singing the blues since his romance went kaput."

== Personnel ==
- Lead vocals by David Ruffin and Melvin Franklin
- Background vocals by Eddie Kendricks, Melvin Franklin, Paul Williams, and Otis Williams
- Instrumentation by The Funk Brothers and the Detroit Symphony Orchestra.

== Charts ==
The Temptations

Chart (1965)	Peak position
U.S. Billboard Hot 100 Chart	17
U.S. Billboard R&B Singles	4

== Luther Vandross cover ==
"Since I Lost My Baby"

Single by Luther Vandross

from the album Forever, for Always, for Love
- B-side: "You're The Sweetest One"
- Released: 1982
- Studio: Mediasound, New York City
- Genre: R&B, soul
- Length: 3:50
- Label: Epic Records
- Songwriters: Smokey Robinson; Warren Moore
- Producer: Luther Vandross

Luther Vandross singles chronology
"Bad Boy/Having a Party" (1982)	"Since I Lost My Baby" (1982)	"How Many Times Can We Say Goodbye" (1983)

Luther Vandross covered the song for his 1982 album Forever, for Always, for Love. In 1983, Vandross' cover was a top twenty R&B hit, peaking to #17 on Billboards Hot R&B Singles chart.

=== Personnel ===
- Luther Vandross – lead and background vocals, rhythm arrangement, vocal arrangement
- Nat Adderley Jr. – keyboards, rhythm arrangement
- Marcus Miller – bass
- Yogi Horton – drums
- Doc Powell – guitar
- Paulinho da Costa, Sammy Figueroa – percussion
- Paul Riser – string and horn arrangement
- Cissy Houston, Tawatha Agee, Phillip Ballou, Brenda White, Norma Jean Wright, Paulette McWilliams, Fonzi Thornton – background vocals

=== Charts ===
Chart (1983)	Peak position
U.S. Billboard R&B Singles	17
