= Girl (Why You Wanna Make Me Blue) =

Song by The Temptations

Single by the Temptations

from the album The Temptin' Temptations
- B-side: "Baby, Baby I Need You"
- Released: August 20, 1964
- Recorded: Hitsville USA; July 6, 1964
- Genre: Soul, R&B, Pop
- Length: 2:16
- Label: Gordy; G 7035
- Songwriter(s): Norman Whitfield; Edward Holland, Jr.
- Producer(s): Norman Whitfield

The Temptations singles chronology
"I'll Be in Trouble" (1964)	"Girl (Why You Wanna Make Me Blue)" (1964)	"My Girl" (1964)

"Girl (Why You Wanna Make Me Blue)" is a song by the Temptations, released in 1964 by the Gordy (Motown) label. It was the group's first A-side release to be produced by Norman Whitfield, who co-wrote the song with Edward Holland, Jr. of the Holland-Dozier-Holland songwriting team. With Eddie Kendricks singing lead for the third single in a row, it peaked on the Billboard Hot 100 Pop charts in the top 30 at number 26.

As the narrator of the up-tempo song, Kendricks tells his girl "I love you, girl, with all my heart and soul/ I can't understand why you treat me cold", and now his "heart feels the pain" caused by her mistreatment of him. This single would be Kendricks' last as lead on an A-side until "Get Ready" in 1966, and the last for Whitfield as a producer until "Ain't Too Proud to Beg"; this would be because "Get Ready", composed and produced by Smokey Robinson, had missed the Pop Top 20 just like this single did.

Cash Box described the single as "a bright, shuffle-rock handclapping thumper" with a "very commercial 'Detroit' sound."

The next Temptations single, "My Girl", would be the first to feature David Ruffin as lead and would be produced by Robinson. Ruffin, up to this point, had only sung lead on stage and a few unreleased tracks, otherwise singing backgrounds behind Kendricks and then main lead singer Paul Williams. When "My Girl" hit number 1 on the R&B and Pop Charts in 1965, it signaled the continuing of Robinson as the group's main producer, and the start of Ruffin's run as The Temptations' main lead singer.

== Personnel ==
- Lead vocals by Eddie Kendricks
- Background vocals by Melvin Franklin, Paul Williams, David Ruffin, and Otis Williams
- Instrumentation by The Funk Brothers

== Chart history ==
Chart (1964)	Peak position
U.S. Billboard Hot 100 Chart	26
U.S. Cash Box R&B Singles Chart	11

== Cover versions ==
Phil Collins recorded a version of the song for his album of soul covers, Going Back.

In the 1990s, Italian-Brazilian singer Deborah Blando recorded a version of the song as the first cut out of her debut album, A Different Story. She retitled the song to "Boy (Why You Wanna Make Me Blue)". The song and video were a theme for Pepsi advertisements in the summer of 1991. The song peaked at number 122 in Australia.
