= I'll Be in Trouble =

1964 single by The Temptations

Single by the Temptations

from the album The Temptin' Temptations
- B-side: "The Girl's Alright with Me"
- Released: April 29, 1964
- Recorded: March 25, 1964
- Studio: Hitsville USA (Studio A), Detroit, Michigan
- Genre: Soul, R&B
- Length: 2:55
- Label: Gordy
- Songwriter(s): Smokey Robinson
- Producer(s): Smokey Robinson

The Temptations singles chronology
"The Way You Do the Things You Do" (1964)	"I'll Be in Trouble" (1964)	"Girl (Why You Wanna Make Me Blue)" (1964)

"I'll Be in Trouble" is a single by the Temptations, released in 1964 for the Gordy (Motown) label and written by the Miracles' lead singer Smokey Robinson.

== Background ==
This single was the follow-up to "The Way You Do the Things You Do", with falsetto Eddie Kendricks as the main lead, the group's bass singer, Melvin Franklin, also has got a lead part on the bridge. As the song's narrator, Kendricks asks his lover to always stay with him, telling her "no matter what you do or say, I know I'm gonna love you anyway", and if she leaves anyway "I'll Be in Trouble." Known for creating repetitive follow-ups, Motown at this time was relying on a formula to create songs with a similar sound that would be present in records by their various recording artists. Sure enough this song does have a similar sound as the previous single, and the label hope it would repeat (and surpass) the success of "The Way You Do the Things You Do".

The single was issued with "The Girl's Alright with Me", also led by Kendricks, as its B-side. As such it is one of the handful of singles by The Temptations where both sides charted (it peaked at 2 on the Billboard Bubbling Under Hot 100 charts). However, as it was only a Top 40 Pop hit, it did not meet with the expected degree of success, and producer/songwriter Norman Whitfield would be given the next single (the Kendricks led "Girl (Why You Wanna Make Me Blue)"). When it also failed to hit the desired placing on the Pop charts, Robinson would return as The Temptations producer beginning with "My Girl". Both sides of this single would later appear on the group's 1965 album The Temptin' Temptations.

Cash Box described it as a "rhythmic" song and as "contagious handclapping rock stuff."

== Personnel ==
- Lead vocals by Eddie Kendricks and Melvin Franklin
- Background vocals by Melvin Franklin, Paul Williams, David Ruffin, and Otis Williams
- Instrumentation by The Funk Brothers

== Chart history ==
"I'll Be in Trouble" was a Top 40 hit on the Billboard Hot 100, peaking at number 33.

Chart (1964)	Peak position
U.S. Billboard Hot 100 Chart	33
U.S. Cash Box R&B Singles Chart	22
Canada (RPM)	28
