= Beauty Is Only Skin Deep =

1966 single by The Temptations

Single by the Temptations
- B-side: "You're Not an Ordinary Girl"
- Released: August 4, 1966
- Recorded: Hitsville USA (Studio A); April 14, 1964 and May 11, 1966
- Genre: R&B
- Length: 2:23
- Label: Gordy; G 7055
- Songwriter(s): Norman Whitfield; Edward Holland, Jr.
- Producer(s): Norman Whitfield

The Temptations singles chronology
"Ain't Too Proud to Beg" (1966)	"Beauty Is Only Skin Deep" (1966)	"(I Know) I'm Losing You" (1966)

"Beauty Is Only Skin Deep" is a 1966 song, written by Norman Whitfield and Edward Holland, Jr., and produced by Whitfield. Norman Whitfield recorded the song's instrumental track. Two years later, Whitfield got together with Eddie Holland to have lyrics written for the song.

Several artists recorded "Beauty Is Only Skin Deep" before the Temptations, including David Ruffin's older brother Jimmy Ruffin, and The Miracles, who were actually the first to record it in 1964, but their version was not released as a single. It was later included on their 1966 Away We a Go-Go album.

== The Temptations recording ==
The song was a 1966 hit single when it was recorded by The Temptations for the Gordy (Motown) label. Billboard described the single as a "smooth rocker featuring bongo and brass and a well-done vocal on a strong lyric." The song was a number three pop hit and a number one R&B hit in the United States. Outside the US, it was also a hit in the United Kingdom, making it to #18 on the UK Singles Chart in late 1966. The song never appeared on a regular Temptations studio LP, but was featured on the group's 1966 first Greatest Hits album.

It was chosen as a single by Billie Jean Brown, head of Motown's quality control department. The group appealed the decision to Motown head Berry Gordy, who preferred it to the group's choice. The record proved much more successful than the group members expected.

Cash Box wrote that it is a "mid-tempo, finger-snapping swinger done up in the group’s infectious manner."

=== Personnel ===
- Lead vocals by David Ruffin
- Background vocals by Eddie Kendricks, Melvin Franklin, Paul Williams, and Otis Williams
- Instrumentation by the Funk Brothers

=== Chart performance ===
Chart (1966)	Peak position
UK Singles (The Official Charts Company)	18
US Billboard Hot 100	3
US Billboard Hot Rhythm & Blues Singles	1
