= Cornelius Grant =

American musician (born 1943)

- Born: Cornelius Grant; April 27, 1943 (age 83); Fairfield, Texas, United States
- Genres: R&B, soul
- Occupations: Guitarist, Songwriter
- Instrument: Guitar
- Years active: 1963–present

Cornelius Grant (born April 27, 1943) is an American guitarist, composer, and band leader. He served as the musical director, guitar player, and live show arranger for Motown vocal group The Temptations from 1964 until 1982.

== Early life ==
Grant was born in Fairfield, Texas, United States. Raised by his grandmother, whom he adored, he taught himself how to play guitar at the age of nine.

== Discovery ==
When he was 13, his family moved to Detroit. At 15, he was playing in clubs, bars, talent shows, and other functions. Within three years he was playing with Mary Wells, then Marvin Gaye before The Temptations employed him.

== Compositions ==
Grant used a Gibson Birdland and a Fender Telecaster. He created the opening guitar riff on "I Know I'm Losing You". He wrote the hit song with Eddie Holland and Norman Whitfield. He also wrote "You're My Everything" with Roger Penzabene and Norman Whitfield. Penzabene, a close friend of Grant's, wrote "I Wish It Would Rain" and "I Could Never Love Another".

Grant also wrote "Take Me in Your Arms and Love Me" and "Ain't No Sun (Since You Been Gone)" (performed by Gladys Knight & the Pips); "You Got to Earn It", and "I Gotta Find A Way (To Get You Back)" (performed by the Temptations); and "My Weakness Is You" and "I Want My Baby Back" (performed by Edwin Starr); Grant also co-wrote "I'm More Than Happy (I'm Satisfied)" for Stevie Wonder, and "Love and Affection" for Marvin Gaye.

The vocal arrangements and orchestral arrangements on "Just The Way You Are" were done by Grant (performed by the Temptations).

== Performances ==
With The Temptations he had a chance to play to fans in the Pacific, the Caribbean, Europe, the Middle East, and Africa. They were guests at the White House courtesy of President Richard Nixon. Grant also met Martin Luther King Jr., Julie Nixon Eisenhower, Jesse Jackson, Elton John, and The Beatles, and appeared on many television shows.

Grant played on select Motown studio sessions' with the Funk Brothers from 1964 to 1970, including Gladys Knight & the Pips "I Heard It Through the Grapevine". As a rule, Grant played on all the sessions that featured songs he wrote or co-wrote, except one, "You Got to Earn It", which Smokey Robinson cut while Grant was on the road with the Temptations.

== Other activities ==
In 1983, Grant began writing for The Hollywood Reporter and contributed extensively to BRE Magazine as a columnist. A current project, "Flashbacks and Newtraks” is a radio show featuring interviews, entertainment news, oldies music, and many points of view by him and his co-host Sylkie Green.

When Grant gives lectures, he sometimes shares the podium with Motown insiders such as Don Foster (former Supremes and Temptations manager) and TV writer/Motown historian, Ruth Adkins Robinson.
