= Get Ready (The Temptations song) =

1966 single by The Temptations

- Side A of the US single

Single by the Temptations

from the album Gettin' Ready
- B-side: "Fading Away"
- Released: February 7, 1966
- Recorded: Hitsville USA (Studio A); December 5, December 9, and December 29, 1965
- Genre: R&B; soul
- Length: 2:39
- Label: Gordy; G 7049
- Songwriter: Smokey Robinson
- Producer: Smokey Robinson

The Temptations singles chronology
"My Baby" / "Don't Look Back" (1965)	"Get Ready" (1966)	"Ain't Too Proud to Beg" (1966)

"Get Ready" is a Motown song written by Smokey Robinson, which resulted in two hit records for the label: a U.S. No. 29 version by the Temptations in 1966, and a U.S. No. 4 version by Rare Earth in 1970. It is significant for being the last song Robinson wrote and produced for the Temptations, due to a deal Berry Gordy made with Norman Whitfield, that if "Get Ready" did not meet with the expected degree of success, then Whitfield's song, "Ain't Too Proud to Beg", would get the next release, which resulted in Whitfield more or less replacing Robinson as the group's producer.

== The Temptations version ==
The original Temptations version of "Get Ready", produced by Smokey Robinson, was designed as an answer to the latest dance craze, "The Duck". The Temptations' falsetto Eddie Kendricks sings lead on the song, which Robinson produced as an up-tempo dance number with a prominent rhythm provided by Motown drummer Benny Benjamin. The song made it to No. 1 on the U.S. R&B singles chart, while peaking at No. 29 on the pop charts.

The B-side to "Get Ready" was the ballad "Fading Away", which was also led by Kendricks. Written by The Miracles members Smokey Robinson, Pete Moore, and Bobby Rogers, and produced by Robinson, "Fading Away" was later included on the Temptations 1966 album Gettin' Ready along with the hit side.

The group's previous singles since "My Girl" had all landed in the U.S. Pop charts (and R&B charts) Top 20. However, although it hit No. 1 on the R&B charts (their first since "My Girl"), "Get Ready" was only a Top 30 hit (missing the Top 20 by nine positions), while "Fading Away" missed all U.S. national charts. As was promised, the next single released would have Norman Whitfield's song on it. When Whitfield's "Ain't Too Proud to Beg" (also a No. 1 R&B hit) made it to thirteen on the pop charts, Motown chief Berry Gordy assigned him to be the Temptations' new main producer. "Get Ready" did eventually become a Top 10 pop hit, but not by the Temptations, but by the Motown rock band Rare Earth. (The Temptations' version reached No. 10 in the UK in 1969.)

Until the group recorded "Please Return Your Love to Me" in 1968, this was their last song to feature lead vocals solely by Kendricks, as David Ruffin (who was with the group at the time), and later, Dennis Edwards, would be placed in that role in later songs.

The Temptations re-recorded the song as part of a series of promos for American television network CBS during the 1990-91 TV season. The network had been using the "Get Ready for CBS" tagline since 1988, and the song's lyrics were modified to incorporate the tagline.

== Charts ==
Chart (1966–1967)	Peak position
Canada RPM Top Singles	32
UK Singles Chart	10
US Billboard Hot 100	29
US Billboard Hot Rhythm & Blues Singles	1
US Cash Box Top 100	29

== Certifications ==
Region	Certification	Certified units/sales
United Kingdom (BPI)	Silver	200,000^{‡}
^{‡} Sales+streaming figures based on certification alone.

== Rare Earth version ==
"Get Ready"

Single by Rare Earth

from the album Get Ready
- B-side: "Magic Key"
- Released: February 18, 1970
- Recorded: Hitsville USA (Studio A); 1969
- Length: 21:32 (album version); 2:46 (single version)
- Label: Rare Earth; R 5012
- Songwriter: Smokey Robinson
- Producer: Rare Earth

Rare Earth singles chronology
"Generation, Light Up the Sky" (1969)	"Get Ready" (1970)	"(I Know) I'm Losing You" (1970)

The rock band Rare Earth regularly played "Get Ready" in concert, where it was a popular staple of their live performances, and recorded a version for their 1968 Verve release, Dreams/Answers. After signing with Motown, executive Barney Ales asked the band to re-record the song for their first release on Motown's then-unnamed rock subsidiary, due to the audience response to the band's cover. After recording a version which was scrapped, the band themselves set up their own recording equipment and recorded a 21-minute version, which later had audience applause dubbed in. The new recording of "Get Ready" was edited down to 2:46 for a single, which was given a Tamla Motown release in the UK, the only release by the band to appear on Motown itself, and unlike the Temptations' version, Rare Earth's recording was a success on the pop chart. The single peaked at #4 on the Billboard Hot 100 chart in 1970. The Rare Earth version of the song also peaked at number twenty on the R&B chart.

Rare Earth's version of "Get Ready" was routinely used by hip hop artist DJ Kool Herc in turntablism performances. Pioneering hip hop journalist Steven Hager wrote that Rare Earth's recording "was a favorite in the Bronx because it lasted over twenty-one minutes, which was long enough for the serious dancers to get into the beat. They loved to wait for the song's two-minute drum solo to show their most spectacular moves."

=== Charts ===
==== Weekly charts ====
Chart (1970)	Peak position
Argentina (CAPIF)	10
Belgium (Ultratop 50 Flanders)	21
Belgium (Ultratop 50 Wallonia)	12
Canada Top Singles (RPM)	1
West Germany (GfK)	22
Netherlands (Dutch Top 40)	18
Netherlands (Single Top 100)	12
US Billboard Hot 100	4
US Best Selling Soul Singles (Billboard)	20
US Cash Box Top 100	2

==== Year-end charts ====
Chart (1970)	Rank
Canada	31
U.S. Billboard Hot 100	8
U.S. Cash Box	4

=== Certifications ===
Region	Certification	Certified units/sales
United States (RIAA)	Gold	500,000^{^}
^{^} Shipments figures based on certification alone.

== Other cover versions ==
- The song was Ella Fitzgerald's last US chart record (1969), reaching the Billboard Bubbling Under the Hot 100 survey (#126) and the Record World "Non-Rock Top 40". She performed it on The Carol Burnett Show in November 1969.
- Australian singer Carol Hitchcock released a version which was produced by Stock, Aitken and Waterman in 1987 that became a moderate hit in her homeland, peaking at No. 18, but only achieved minor UK success, peaking at No. 56.
- The Supremes covered the song on their album The Supremes A' Go-Go which was also released in 1966.
- The song was recorded by its original author Smokey Robinson, for his 1979 album Where There's Smoke…. This 6-minute disco version was also released as a single and made #82 on the R&B Charts.
- The group again re-recorded the song from their 1991 album, Milestone as a dance version to the original recording.
- Scottish band The Proclaimers recorded a version of the song for the soundtrack of Dumb and Dumber (1994).
