= The Way You Do the Things You Do =

1964 single by The Temptations

- Side A of the Australian single

Single by The Temptations

from the album Meet the Temptations and The Temptations Sing Smokey
- B-side: "Just Let Me Know"
- Released: January 23, 1964
- Studio: Hitsville USA (Studio A)
- Length: 2:42
- Label: Gordy
- Songwriters: Smokey Robinson, Robert Rogers
- Producer: Smokey Robinson

The Temptations singles chronology
"Farewell My Love" (1963)	"The Way You Do the Things You Do" (1964)	"I'll Be in Trouble" (1964)

"The Way You Do the Things You Do" is a 1964 hit single by American group the Temptations for the Gordy (Motown) label. Written by Miracles members Smokey Robinson and Bobby Rogers, the single was the Temptations' first charting single on the US Billboard Hot 100, peaking in the Top 20 at number eleven; it also went to number one on the Cash Box R&B chart. The song has been an American Top 40 hit in four successive decades, from the 1960s to the 1990s. A version by Hall & Oates featuring Temptation members Eddie Kendricks and David Ruffin was nominated for a Grammy Award in 1986. A cover version by British reggae band UB40 hit number six in the U.S. in 1990.

== Personnel ==
- Lead vocals by Eddie Kendricks
- Background vocals by Melvin Franklin, Paul Williams, David Ruffin, and Otis Williams
- Instrumentation by the Funk Brothers
  - Bass: James Jamerson
  - Drums: Richard "Pistol" Allen
  - Guitar: Eddie Willis
  - Piano: Earl Van Dyke
  - Tenor saxophone solo: Henry Cosby

== Charts ==
Chart (1964)	Peak position
Canada CHUM Chart Top 50	43
US Billboard Hot 100	11
US Cash Box Top 100	10
US Cash Box R&B Singles Chart	1

== Rita Coolidge version ==
"The Way You Do the Things You Do"

Single by Rita Coolidge

from the album Anytime...Anywhere
- B-side: "I Feel the Burden (Being Lifted Off My Shoulders)"
- Released: June 1978
- Length: 3:35
- Label: A&M
- Songwriters: Smokey Robinson, Robert Rogers
- Producer: David Anderle

Rita Coolidge singles chronology
"We're All Alone" (1977)	"The Way You Do the Things You Do" (1978)	"You" (1978)

American recording artist Rita Coolidge covered "The Way You Do the Things You Do," and it was released in 1978 by A&M Records as the third single from her most successful album, Anytime...Anywhere (1977). In the US, the single reached number 20 on the Billboard Hot 100, number 20 on the Record World Singles Chart and number 18 on the Cash Box Top 100. It also reached number 16 in Canada. It is ranked as the 151st biggest Canadian hit of 1978.

=== Charts ===
==== Weekly charts ====
Chart (1978)	Peak position
Canada Top Singles (RPM)	16
Canada Adult Contemporary (RPM)	13
US Billboard Hot 100	20
US Adult Contemporary (Billboard)	9
US Cash Box Top 100	18

==== Year-end charts ====
Chart (1978)	Position
Canada (RPM)	151

== Hall & Oates version ==
In 1985, a live version (part of a medley with "My Girl") was released by Hall & Oates featuring David Ruffin and Eddie Kendricks, reaching number 20 on the US Billboard Hot 100, number 12 on the Adult Contemporary chart, number 40 on the R&B chart and number 24 on Radio & Records. The single was nominated for a Grammy Award.

=== Reception ===
John Leland at Spin said, "This record is pretty wonderful and it's definitely better than most H & O or Temps fare, but it also bores me in ways it shouldn't. If there was any emoting going on in the performance, it didn't translate onto wax."

== UB40 version ==
"The Way You Do the Things You Do"

Single by UB40

from the album Labour of Love II
- B-side: "Splugen"
- Released: 1990
- Genre: Reggae
- Length: 3:03
- Label: DEP International; Virgin
- Songwriters: Smokey Robinson; Robert Rogers
- Producer: UB40

UB40 singles chronology
"Wear You to the Ball" (1990)	"The Way You Do the Things You Do" (1990)	"I'll Be Your Baby Tonight" (1990)

"The Way You Do the Things You Do" was covered by the English reggae band UB40. It was released as the sixth single from their ninth album, Labour of Love II (1990). The song was released in 1990 by DEP International and Virgin Records in the majority of European countries.

=== Track listings ===
- 7-inch single
1. "The Way You Do the Things You Do" (3:03)
2. "Splugen" (4:41)
- CD single
1. "The Way You Do the Things You Do" (3:03)
2. "Splugen" (4:41)
- Maxi-CD
1. "The Way You Do the Things You Do" (Jazzy Club mix) (6:11)
2. "The Way You Do the Things You Do" (Paradise mix) (4:07)
3. "The Way You Do the Things You Do" (3:00)
4. "Splugen" (4:42)

=== Charts ===
==== Weekly charts ====
Chart (1990–1991)	Peak position
Australia (ARIA)	78
Belgium (Ultratop 50 Flanders)	37
Canada Top Singles (RPM)	42
Europe (European Hit Radio)	13
France (SNEP)	11
Germany (GfK)	53
Ireland (IRMA)	26
Netherlands (Dutch Top 40)	11
Netherlands (Single Top 100)	15
UK Singles (Official Charts)	49
UK Airplay (Music Week)	4
US Billboard Hot 100	6
US Adult Contemporary (Billboard)	21
US Cash Box Top 100	4

Chart (1992)	Peak position
Australia (ARIA)	63

==== Year-end charts ====
Chart (1991)	Rank
US Billboard Hot 100	71

=== Certifications ===
Region	Certification	Certified units/sales
France (SNEP)	Silver	200,000^{*}
New Zealand (RMNZ)	3× Platinum	90,000^{‡}
United Kingdom (BPI)	Silver	200,000^{‡}
^{*} Sales figures based on certification alone.^{‡} Sales+streaming figures based on certification alone.

=== Release history ===
Region	Date	Format(s)	Label(s)	Ref.
United States	1990	Cassette	Virgin	
Australia	November 19, 1990	7-inch vinyl; cassette	Virgin	
United Kingdom	January 21, 1991	7-inch vinyl; 12-inch vinyl; CD; cassette	DEP International; Virgin	
