= My Girl (The Temptations song) =

1964 single by the Temptations

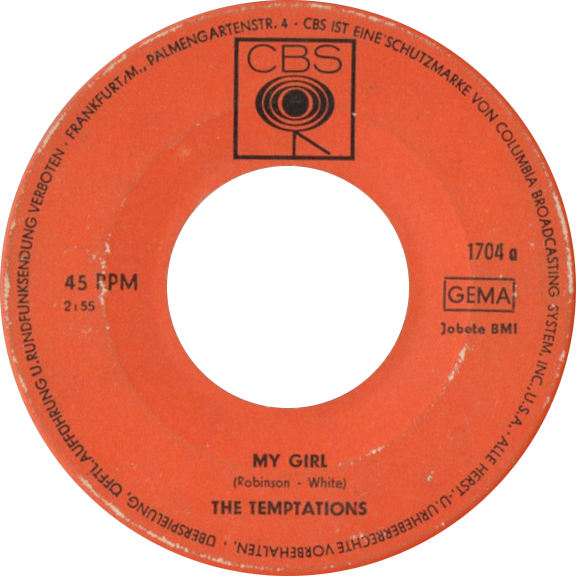
- Side A of the German single

Single by the Temptations

from the album The Temptations Sing Smokey
- B-side: "(Talking 'Bout) Nobody But My Baby"
- Released: December 21, 1964
- Recorded: September 25, November 10 & 17, 1964
- Studio: Hitsville USA (Detroit, Michigan)
- Genre: Soul; pop
- Length: 2:45 (album version); 2:56 (single version)
- Label: Gordy
- Songwriters: Smokey Robinson; Ronald White
- Producers: Smokey Robinson; Ronald White

The Temptations singles chronology
"Girl (Why You Wanna Make Me Blue)" (1964)	"My Girl" (1964)	"It's Growing" (1965)

"My Girl" is a song recorded by American vocal group the Temptations for the Gordy (Motown) record label in 1964. Written and produced by the Miracles members Smokey Robinson and Ronald White, it became the Temptations' first US number-one single, and is considered their signature song. Robinson's inspiration for writing "My Girl" was his wife, Miracles member Claudette Rogers Robinson. The song was included on the Temptations 1965 album The Temptations Sing Smokey. In 2017, the song was selected for preservation in the National Recording Registry by the Library of Congress as being "culturally, historically, or aesthetically significant".

== Recording and release ==
The recorded version of "My Girl" was the first Temptations single to feature David Ruffin on lead vocals. Previously, Eddie Kendricks and Paul Williams had performed most of the group's lead vocals, and Ruffin had joined the group as a replacement for former Temptation Elbridge Bryant. While on tour as part of the Motortown Revue, a collective tour for most of the Motown roster, Smokey Robinson caught the Temptations' part of the show. For their set, the group had included a medley of soul standards, one of which, the Drifters' "Under the Boardwalk", was a solo spot for Ruffin. Impressed, Robinson decided to produce a single with Ruffin singing lead. Robinson saw Ruffin as a "sleeping giant" in the group with a unique voice that was "mellow" yet "gruff". The composition was to be something that Ruffin could "belt out" yet something that was also "melodic and sweet".

After some persuasion from Ruffin's bandmates, Robinson had the Temptations record "My Girl" instead of the Miracles, who were originally going to record the song, and recruited Ruffin to sing the lead vocals. According to Robinson, he allowed the group to create their own background vocals "because they were so great at background vocals". Consequently, the Temptations came up with boosts like "hey hey hey" and a series of "my girls" that echo David's vocal." The opening bass notes are recognized around the world. As Smokey Robinson says, "I can be in a foreign country where people don't speak English and the audience will start cheering before I even start singing "My Girl." They know what's coming as soon as they hear the opening bass line. [He sings the famous line created by bassist James Jamerson:] 'Bah bum-bum, bah bum-bum, bah bum-bum.'" The signature guitar riff heard during the introduction and under the verses was played by Robert White of the Funk Brothers. This part can be heard without vocals on the 2004 deluxe edition of the soundtrack from the 2002 documentary Standing in the Shadows of Motown.

The Temptations also recorded German and Italian-language versions of the song, "Mein Girl" and "Solamente Lei", released in 1965 and 1966 respectively. Both versions were later included on two various Motown artists compilation albums, the one-CD Motown Around the World (1987) and the two-CD Motown Around the World: The Classic Singles (2010), as well as on the Temptations' compilation album 50th Anniversary – The Singles Collection (1961–1971) (2011).

The song was re-released following the November 1991 release of the film My Girl, which includes the song. It reached number 27 on the US Billboard Adult Contemporary chart while reaching number two on the UK Singles Chart.

"My Girl" was later sampled for "Stay", a single from the Temptations' 1998 album Phoenix Rising, which reached No. 28 on the US R&B chart.

== Reception ==
"My Girl" climbed to the top of the US pop charts on March 6, 1965, after its Christmas time 1964 release, making it the Temptations' first number-one hit. The single was also the first number-one hit on the reinstated Billboard R&B Singles chart, which had gone on a 15-month hiatus from 1963 to 1965. The single also gave the Gordy label its first number one on the Hot 100.

Over time, "My Girl", with its signature introduction and unrestrained expression of joy, became one of Motown's best-known and most successful singles. "My Girl" was inducted into the Grammy Hall of Fame in 1998.

Cash Box magazine described the single as "a pulsating, shuffle-wobble ballad" performed "in very tempting style" and with a "striking arrangement". Record World said, "Teens won't be able to resist Temptations' new one, which is a sweet and slow tribute to a teen angel." In 2004, "My Girl" was ranked number 88 on Rolling Stone's list of "The 500 Greatest Songs of All Time". The song was re-ranked and moved to number 43 in the 2021 edition.

The song gained prominence in the baseball world during the 2024 Major League Baseball season when New York Mets shortstop Francisco Lindor used "My Girl" as his walk-up song. During the postseason, Mets fans, during home games at Citi Field, serenaded Lindor during his at bats by singing the first few lines of the song. Before Game 5 of the 2024 National League Championship Series on October 18, the Temptations performed the song live at Citi Field. On February 25, 2025, Lindor announced that he would use the song again for the 2025 MLB season.

== Personnel ==
- David Ruffin – lead tenor vocals
- Eddie Kendricks – first tenor/falsetto backing vocals
- Melvin Franklin – bass backing vocals
- Paul Williams – baritone backing vocals
- Otis Williams – second tenor backing vocals
- The Funk Brothers and the Detroit Symphony Orchestra – instrumentation
  - Robert White – guitar
  - Earl Van Dyke – piano
  - James Jamerson – bass
  - Benny Benjamin – drums
  - Paul Riser – horn and string arrangements

== Charts ==
=== Weekly charts ===
Chart (1964–1965)	Peak position
Canada Top Singles (RPM)	6
UK Singles (Official Charts)	43
US Billboard Hot 100	1
US Hot Rhythm & Blues Singles	1
US Cash Box Top 100	2

Chart (1989)	Peak position
Netherlands (Single Top 100)	27

Chart (1991–1992)	Peak position
Australia (ARIA)	104
Canada Adult Contemporary (RPM)	30
Europe (Eurochart Hot 100)	11
Germany (GfK)	66
Ireland (IRMA)	2
Portugal (AFP)	5
UK Singles (Official Charts)	2
UK Airplay (Music Week)	7
US Adult Contemporary (Billboard)	27

Chart (2012)	Peak position
South Korea International (Circle)	82

=== Year-end charts ===
Chart (1965)	Position
US Billboard Hot 100	10
US Cash Box Top 100	16

Chart (1992)	Position
UK Singles (OCC)	22
UK Airplay (Music Week)	74

== Certifications ==
Region	Certification	Certified units/sales
Denmark (IFPI Danmark)	Platinum	90,000^{‡}
Italy (FIMI)	Gold	25,000^{‡}
New Zealand (RMNZ)	5× Platinum	150,000^{‡}
Spain (Promusicae)	Platinum	60,000^{‡}
United Kingdom (BPI)	3× Platinum	1,800,000^{‡}
United States (RIAA)	7× Platinum	7,000,000^{‡}
^{‡} Sales+streaming figures based on certification alone.

== Cover versions ==
In 1965, American singer and songwriter Otis Redding recorded the song for his album Otis Blue. Released as a single, it was the first version to be successful in the United Kingdom, reaching No.11 in the UK Singles Chart.

In 1988, American R&B singer Suave released a cover of "My Girl"; this version peaked at number 20 on the Billboard Hot 100 and number three on the Hot Black Singles chart in May of that year.

In 2005, Australian pop group Human Nature released a cover of "My Girl" for their fifth studio album, Reach Out: The Motown Record. The album debuted at number #6 on the Australian ARIA Music Charts, peaking at number #1 later that year.

== See also ==
- List of Billboard Hot 100 number-one singles of 1965
- List of number-one R&B singles of 1965 (U.S.)
