= Emperors of Soul =

1994 box set compilation by The Temptations

Box set by The Temptations
- Released: September 20, 1994
- Recorded: 1959–1994
- Genre: Doo wop/soul/psychedelic soul/funk/pop/R&B
- Length: 385:36
- Label: Motown
- Producer: Various

Professional ratings
Review scores
Source	Rating
Allmusic	4.5/5 stars

Emperors of Soul is a 1994 box set compilation for The Temptations, released by Motown Records. The five-disc collection covers the Temptations' entire four-decade history, from the first recording of The Distants in 1959 ("Come On") to four new recordings by the then-current Temptations lineup of Ali-Ollie Woodson, Theo Peoples, Ron Tyson, and stalwart members Otis Williams and Melvin Franklin.

The first two discs and the first half of the third disc collect the original mono versions of the Temptations' most popular singles, including "My Girl", "Ain't Too Proud to Beg", and "Just My Imagination (Running Away with Me)", and several b-sides, album tracks, and unreleased songs. The rest of the set continues on through the 1970s, 1980s, and 1990s with later hits, album tracks, and unreleased songs.

== Track listing ==
* - previously unreleased
** - mono 45 single, with stereo LP intro added to beginning
*** - newly recorded song

=== Disc 1: Early years ===
All tracks in mono.

1. "Come On" (by Otis Williams & the Distants) (Otis Williams, Johnnie Mae Matthews, J. Bennett)
2. "Oh, Mother of Mine" (Mickey Stevenson, Otis Williams)
3. "Romance Without Finance" (Stevenson, Eddie Kendricks)
4. "Check Yourself" (Berry Gordy, Elbridge Bryant, Melvin Franklin, Williams)
5. "Dream Come True" (Gordy)
6. "Mind Over Matter (I'm Gonna Make You Mine)" (credited as "The Pirates") (Devora Brown)
7. "I'll Love You 'Til I Die" (credited as "The Pirates") (Clarence Paul)
8. "Paradise" (Gordy)
9. "Slow Down Heart" (Smokey Robinson)
10. "I Couldn't Cry If I Wanted To" (Norman Whitfield, Eddie Holland)
11. "Witchcraft (For Your Love)" (Stevenson, Robert Hamilton)*
12. "I Want A Love I Can See" (Robinson)
13. "The Further You Look, The Less You See" (Robinson, Norman Whitfield)
14. "Farewell My Love" (Gordy)
15. "A Tear From A Woman's Eyes" (Brian Holland, Lamont Dozier, Eddie Holland)
16. "The Way You Do the Things You Do" (Robinson, Bobby Rogers)
17. "I'll Be in Trouble" (Robinson)
18. "The Girl's Alright With Me" (Whitfield, Kendricks, Holland)
19. "Girl (Why You Wanna Make Me Blue)" (Whitfield, Holland)
20. "Baby, Baby I Need You" (Robinson)
21. "My Girl" (Robinson, Ronnie White)
22. "(Talking 'Bout) Nobody But My Baby" (Whitfield, Holland)
23. "It's Growing" (Robinson, Pete Moore)
24. "You'll Lose A Precious Love" (Robinson)
25. "Since I Lost My Baby" (Robinson, Moore)
26. "You've Got To Earn It" (Robinson, Cornelius Grant)
27. "My Baby" (Robinson, Moore, Rogers)
28. "Don't Look Back" (Robinson, White)

=== Disc 2: "Classic-5" years ===
All tracks in mono unless otherwise noted.

1. "Get Ready" (Robinson)
2. "Fading Away" (Robinson, Moore, Rogers)
3. "Ain't Too Proud to Beg" (Whitfield, Holland)
4. "Too Busy Thinking About My Baby" (Whitfield, Barrett Strong, Janie Bradford)
5. "Who You Gonna Run To" (Robinson)
6. "Beauty Is Only Skin Deep" (Whitfield, Holland)
7. "I Got Heaven Right Here On Earth"* (Kendricks, Whitfield, Holland)
8. "(I Know) I'm Losing You" (Grant, Whitfield, Holland)
9. "All I Need" (Frank Wilson, Holland, R. Dean Taylor)
10. "Sorry Is A Sorry Word" (Holland, Ivy Jo Hunter)
11. "I'm Doing It All"* (Robinson, Grant)
12. "No More Water In The Well" (Robinson, Moore, Rogers)
13. "You're My Everything" (Grant, Whitfield, Roger Penzabene)
14. "Just One Last Look" (Holland-Dozier-Holland)
15. "Angel Doll"* (Stevie Wonder, Clarence Paul, Morris Broadnax)
16. "(Loneliness Made Me Realize) It's You That I Need" (Whitfield, Holland)
17. "Don't Send Me Away" (Kendricks, Robinson)
18. "Hello Young Lovers" (Richard Rodgers, Oscar Hammerstein II)
19. "Ol' Man River" [Alternate Version]* (Jerome Kern, Hammerstein II)
20. "I Wish It Would Rain" (Whitfield, Strong, Penzabene)
21. "I Truly, Truly Believe" (George Gordy, Margaret Gordy, Allen Story)
22. "I Could Never Love Another (After Loving You)" (Whitfield, Strong, Penzabene)
23. "Please Return Your Love To Me" (Whitfield, Strong, Barbara Neely)
24. "How Can I Forget" (Whitfield, Strong)
25. "For Once in My Life" (live from TCB) (stereo) (Ron Miller, Orlando Murden)
26. "My Girl" [Acapella] (bonus track) (Robinson, White)

=== Disc 3: "Psychedelic soul" years ===
All tracks in stereo unless otherwise noted.

1. "Cloud Nine" (mono) (Whitfield, Strong)
2. "Why Did She Have To Leave Me (Why Did She Have To Go)" (mono) (Whitfield, Strong)
3. "I'm Gonna Make You Love Me" (Diana Ross & the Supremes and the Temptations) (Kenny Gamble, Leon Huff, Jerry Ross)
4. "I'll Try Something New" (Diana Ross & the Supremes and the Temptations) (mono) (Robinson)
5. "Runaway Child, Running Wild" (single edit) (mono) (Whitfield, Strong)
6. "Don't Let the Joneses Get You Down" (mono) (Whitfield, Strong)
7. "I Can't Get Next to You" (mono) (Whitfield, Strong)
8. "Message From A Black Man" (Whitfield, Strong)
9. "War" (Whitfield, Strong)
10. "Psychedelic Shack" ** (Whitfield, Strong)
11. "Hum Along and Dance" (Whitfield, Strong)
12. "Ball of Confusion (That's What the World Is Today)" (mono) (Whitfield, Strong)
13. "Ungena Za Ulimwengu (Unite The World)" (mono) (Whitfield, Strong)
14. "Just My Imagination (Running Away with Me)" (mono) (Whitfield, Strong)
15. "Take a Look Around" (Whitfield, Strong)
16. "It's Summer" (Whitfield, Strong)
17. "Superstar (Remember How You Got Where You Are)" (Whitfield, Strong)
18. "I Ain't Got Nothin'" (C. Maurice King, Evans King)
19. "Mother Nature" (Dino Fekaris, Nick Zesses)
20. "Papa Was a Rollin' Stone" (single edit) (Whitfield, Strong)

=== Disc 4: Funk/disco years ===
All songs in stereo.

1. "Masterpiece" (single edit) (Whitfield)
2. "Plastic Man" (single edit) (Whitfield)
3. "Hey Girl" (I Like Your Style) (Whitfield)
4. "Law Of The Land" [Alternate Mix] * (Whitfield)
5. "Let Your Hair Down" (Whitfield)
6. "Heavenly" (Whitfield)
7. "You've Got My Soul on Fire" (Whitfield)
8. "Happy People" (Lionel Richie, Jeffrey Bowen, Donald Baldwin)
9. "Shakey Ground" (Eddie Hazel, Al Boyd, Bowen)
10. "Glasshouse" (Charlemagne)
11. "A Song for You" (Leon Russell)
12. "Memories" (Baldwin, Bowen, Kathy Wakefield)
13. "Keep Holdin' On" (Brian Holland, Eddie Holland)
14. "Darling, Stand By Me (Song For My Woman)" (Dennis Edwards, Richard Street, Franklin, Williams)
15. "Who Are You" (original title: "Who Are You (and What Are You Doing the Rest of Your Life)")
16. "In a Lifetime" (Ron Tyson, Ron Baker)
17. "Power" (Gordy, Angelo Bond, Jean Mayer)
18. "Isn't the Night Fantastic" (Franklin, Edwards, Street, Williams, Glenn Leonard)
19. "Aiming at Your Heart" (Charles B. Simmons, Richard Roebuck, Joseph B. Jefferson)

=== Disc 5: 1980s and 1990s ===
All songs in stereo.

1. "Standing On The Top" [Pt. 1] (Rick James)
2. "Sail Away"
3. "Treat Her Like A Lady" (Ali-Ollie Woodson, Williams)
4. "My Love Is True (Truly For You)"
5. "Do You Really Love Your Baby"
6. "Magic"
7. "Lady Soul" (Mark Holden)
8. "I Wonder Who She's Seeing Now"
9. "Look What You Started"
10. "Soul To Soul"
11. "Special"
12. "My Kind Of Woman" *
13. "Hoops Of Fire"
14. "Error Of Our Ways" ***
15. "Givin' U The Best" ***
16. "Elevator Eyes" ***
17. "Blueprint For Love" ***

== Personnel ==
=== Disc One ===
- Originally recorded between 1959 and 1965
- Lead and background vocals: Paul Williams, Eddie Kendricks, David Ruffin, Elbridge "Al" Bryant, Melvin Franklin, Otis Williams
- Lead vocals on "Come On": Richard Street
- Additional background vocals on "Come On": James "Pee-Wee" Crawford.
- Additional background vocals on "Come On" and "It's Growing": The Andantes
- Producers: Johnnie Mae Matthews, Morty Craft, Andre Williams, William "Mickey" Stevenson, Berry Gordy, Smokey Robinson, Clarence Paul, Norman Whitfield, and Holland-Dozier-Holland
- Instrumentation: The Funk Brothers

=== Disc Two ===
- Originally recorded between 1965 and 1968; bonus track recorded in 1964
- Lead and background vocals by David Ruffin, Eddie Kendricks, Paul Williams, Melvin Franklin, and Otis Williams
- Producers: Norman Whitfield, Smokey Robinson, Frank Wilson, Holland-Dozier-Holland, Clarence Paul, Jeffrey Bowen, and Ivy Jo Hunter
- Instrumentation: The Funk Brothers and L.A. session artists
- Aaron Smith: Drums

=== Disc Three ===
- Originally recorded between 1968 and 1972
- Lead and background vocals by Dennis Edwards, Eddie Kendricks, Paul Williams, Melvin Franklin, Otis Williams, Richard Street, and Damon Harris
- Lead vocals on "I'm Gonna Make You Love Me" and "I'll Try Something New": Diana Ross
- Background vocals on "I'm Gonna Make You Love Me" and "I'll Try Something New": Mary Wilson and Cindy Birdsong
- Producers: Norman Whitfield, Frank Wilson, and Nickolas Ashford
- Instrumentation: The Funk Brothers and L.A. session artists

=== Disc Four ===
- Originally recorded between 1972 and 1981
- Lead and background vocals by Dennis Edwards, Richard Street, Damon Harris, Glenn Leonard, Louis Price, Melvin Franklin, and Otis Williams
- Producers: Norman Whitfield, Jeffrey Bowen, Berry Gordy, and James Anthony Carmichael
- Instrumentation: The Funk Brothers, The Commodores, Rose Royce, and L.A. session artists

=== Disc Five ===
- Originally recorded between 1982 and 1994
- Lead and background vocals by Dennis Edwards, Ali-Ollie Woodson, Richard Street, Glenn Leonard, Ron Tyson, Theo Peoples, Melvin Franklin, and Otis Williams
- Additional leads and background vocals on "Standing on the Top": Eddie Kendricks, David Ruffin, Rick James, and the Mary Jane Girls
- Guest rap on "My Kind of Woman" by Ice-T
- Producers: Rick James ("Standing on the Top"), Berry Gordy, Thom Bell, Norman Whitfield ("Sail Away"), Ali-Ollie Woodson, and Otis Williams
- Instrumentation: Earl Van Dyke, Ali-Ollie Woodson, Norman Whitfield, and L.A. and Philadelphia session musicians.
