= Isn't She Pretty =

Single by The Temptations

from the album Meet the Temptations
- A-side: "Dream Come True"
- Released: March 16, 1962
- Recorded: Hitsville USA; October 23, 1961
- Genre: Soul, R&B, Doo-wop, Pop
- Length: 2:45
- Label: Gordy; G 7001
- Songwriter(s): Berry Gordy, Jr. Eddie Kendricks; Otis Williams
- Producer(s): Berry Gordy

The Temptations singles chronology
| "Check Yourself" (1961) | "Dream Come True" / "Isn't She Pretty" (1962) | "Paradise" / "Slow Down Heart" (1962) |

"Isn't She Pretty" is a 1961 song recorded by The Temptations, and written by group members Eddie Kendricks and Otis Williams, as well as Motown's founder Berry Gordy. It was Gordy's first production with the group, and intended for released on the Miracle label, but it was shelved due to the label closing, as well as the fact that the Motown execs thought the song sounded a little too dated. It was finally released as the B-side for the group's 1962 single "Dream Come True", their first on the Gordy label imprint.

== Overview ==
=== Recording ===
This is the first of the small handful of pre-psychedelic era songs the group recorded (and the second one released) that had more than two members singing lead at one point. A lot of the song's lead is performed as an ensemble piece, but each member get a chance to also be heard outfront throughout the song. On the song's first verse the entire group sings the lead vocal in unison harmony. Afterwards Elbridge "Al" Bryant and Paul Williams swap leads on the first half of the 2nd and 3rd verses; Eddie Kendricks and Melvin Franklin swap leads on the bridge; Otis Williams gets a line near the end ("She's a doll, now hey…"). It mainly showcases the lead vocals of tenor Bryant, as his ad-libs on the choruses made him the most prominent out front, but technically (group baritone) Paul Williams could also be considered the main lead as he portrays the narrator, who's telling his friends about a beautiful unrequited love:

She's the kind of girl all of my life, now.
(That I'd say) I've wanted to be my wife.

However....

Everytime she comes near me... (response: "what'd you say")
My words just-a disappear! (response: "That's super bad now.")

On the bridge, Franklin, the group's bass, is in the role of another potential beau that decides to ask the woman if he could be her man. Kendricks (as either the girl or as another friend) shoots him down: "No, you don't rate" ("Why")/"You ain't got just what it takes at all." Kendricks's soaring falsetto voice is also prominently heard, and not just in the background, as he delivers several ad-libs of his own throughout the recording.

=== Reception ===
Both sides of the single received a lot of airplay on local Detroit stations, but this b-side never charted nationally (although it was a regional hit). Because of this, and due to the A-side (led by Kendricks) becoming an R&B hit, Paul would be regulated to B-sides until 1963, and it prevented Al from getting any more main leads on the Temptations singles. None of Paul's leads on the A-side would make the Billboard and Cash Box charts, and by 1965 he would be replaced as the group's main lead by, Bryant's successor, David Ruffin. However Paul Williams would finally get a hit on both the Hot 100 and Hot R&B charts with 1965's "Don't Look Back".

== Personnel ==
- Lead & Background vocals by Al Bryant (verses; choruses; ad-libs), Paul Williams (verses; choruses), Eddie Kendricks (verses; choruses; bridge; ad-libs), Melvin Franklin (verses; choruses; bridge), and Otis Williams (verses; choruses)
- Instrumentation by The Funk Brothers
