= The Temptations (miniseries) =

1998 television miniseries by Allan Arkush

- DVD cover
- Screenplay by: Robert Johnson; Kevin Arkadie
- Directed by: Allan Arkush
- Starring: Charles Malik Whitfield; D. B. Woodside; Terron Brooks; Christian Payton; Leon; Tina Lifford; Jenifer Lewis; Gina Ravera; Obba Babatundé; J. August Richards; Vanessa Bell Calloway; Christopher Reid; Mel Jackson; Smokey Robinson; Alan Rosenberg; Bianca Lawson
- Narrated by: Charles Malik Whitfield
- Theme music composer: Smokey Robinson
- Country of origin: United States
- Original language: English
- No. of episodes: 2

Production
- Producers: Jay Benson; Otis Williams; Shelly Berger
- Cinematography: Jamie Anderson
- Editors: John Duffy; Neil Mandelberg
- Running time: 177 minutes
- Production companies: de Passe Entertainment; Hallmark Entertainment; Babelsberg International Film Produktion

Original release
- Network: NBC
- Release: November 1 – November 2, 1998

The Temptations is a four-hour television miniseries broadcast in two-hour halves on NBC, based upon the history of one of Motown's longest-lived acts, The Temptations. Executive produced by former Motown executive Suzanne de Passe, produced by Otis Williams and Temptations manager Shelley Berger, and based upon Williams’ Temptations autobiography, the miniseries was originally broadcast on November 1 and November 2, 1998. It was filmed on location in Pittsburgh, Pennsylvania, in the spring of 1998. Allan Arkush directed the miniseries.

== Overview ==
The miniseries was based upon Otis Williams' book; as such, it came from his perspective: the focus of the story tended to be on Williams and Melvin Franklin, with David Ruffin and Eddie Kendricks seen as antagonists for much of the second half (although Kendricks was still given a more sympathetic portrayal than Ruffin). Dennis Edwards was not heavily focused upon, nor was much said of the problems he later had with Otis Williams. Nevertheless, the miniseries gave a general overview of both the history of the group and that of Motown, and, thanks to de Passe's connection, the film was able to use authentic props and locations.

A number of liberties were taken with factual events for dramatization purposes:

- In the miniseries, during a 1964 New Year's Motown party, Al Bryant is reluctant to perform another encore, and is fired from the group following a backstage altercation with Bryant throwing a beer bottle at Paul Williams. In reality, the incident happened in October 1963, but it was Williams who was reluctant to do another encore. Bryant would be fired two months later for being uncooperative following an annual Christmas party.
- The group's trademark four-headed microphone doesn't debut until Edwards joins the group, but in reality, it debuted in 1966 and in fact, Ruffin was responsible for creating it.
- The miniseries shows David Ruffin developing ego problems and suggesting to change the band's name to "David Ruffin and the Temptations" in early 1966. In reality, it did not happen until late 1967 when The Supremes were re-branded as "Diana Ross and the Supremes".
- In the miniseries, Edwards is visibly angered when Ruffin steals his microphone during a concert performance. In actuality, Edwards claims he gave the microphone and was appreciative for Ruffin's presence.
- While the miniseries dramatically and somewhat accurately portrays Paul Williams's death by suicide, in real life he was found dead in an alley in a car, and not in a parking lot as portrayed.
- In the miniseries it stated that the Temptations left Atlantic Records after recording one album. They actually recorded two albums for Atlantic; Hear to Tempt You in 1977 and Bare Back in 1978.
- Another inaccuracy is the depiction of Ruffin, Kendricks, and Edwards performing together before the 1982 reunion tour; in reality, Ruffin and Kendricks did not start performing together until 1985, with Edwards joining them in 1989 after the group was inducted into the Rock and Roll Hall of Fame.
- David Ruffin was not found dead (after being unceremoniously dumped out of a car) near a hospital, and then taken to a morgue where he would not be properly identified for a week. In reality, he had suffered a drug overdose, and was taken to the hospital by his chauffeur who notified attending staff of Ruffin's identity. Because no one claimed his body immediately after his death, his corpse lay in the morgue for two days; once Ruffin's family was informed of his death, they claimed his body the next day.
- In the miniseries, Melvin Franklin apparently dies in his mother's kitchen. In reality, he died from heart failure at the Cedars-Sinai Medical Center after being admitted following a series of seizures. As Franklin's death was still fresh in the minds of the miniseries' creators (he died in 1995), it was decided that the miniseries would not present Franklin's death as it actually occurred.

As a result, Otis Williams and the producers would be sued by several people portrayed in the film and their families, notably Melvin Franklin's mother and the children and estate of David Ruffin.

Although the movie is set mostly in Detroit and Los Angeles, the producers chose to shoot the film in Pittsburgh, presumably to take advantage of the many different architectural and geographical looks that Pittsburgh offers. De Passe Entertainment had, some six years earlier, shot The Jacksons: An American Dream in Pittsburgh as well.

== Plot ==
=== Part one (November 1, 1998) ===
In 1958, a teenage Otis Williams is running to meet his friend Elbridge "Al" Bryant at a musical performance by The Cadillacs. After the concert that inspired Otis to pursue a music career, Otis and Al go to a barber where they get the Tony Curtis and DA-style process. When Otis goes home for dinner, his stepfather is angry about the new hairstyle and pressures him to work at the assembly line instead of going into music, which Otis heatedly rejects. Six months later, Otis and Al along with two new band members sing on a street corner when they see another group of singers, the Voicemasters, across the street, and are impressed by one singer's bass voice. The next day after school, Otis chases the bass singer named Melvin Franklin before asking him to join his group, Otis Williams & the Siberians. Melvin agrees on the condition that his mother approves, which she later does with Otis' convincing.

The group is singing after school one day when they notice a group of girls watching them. Upon seeing this, the group follows them while singing "Earth Angel". The girls go their separate ways until one of them, Josephine, stays behind before Otis asks her out. The next Saturday, the group hears that they’re wanted at a radio station studio that’s revealed to be in the basement of a run-down apartment. Radio station owner Johnnie May Matthews declares herself their new manager and producer, and also changes their name to Otis Williams and the Distants. In April 1960, the group is waiting to perform at a party where they meet The Primes singers Paul Williams and Eddie Kendricks, The Primettes (who later became The Supremes), The Miracles lead singer Smokey Robinson and Motown Records founder and owner Berry Gordy. The Primes and Primettes perform and the Distants are impressed by their sound. After they perform, Otis and Melvin go to see Berry Gordy, who gives them a business card. Johnnie shows up with a new car she bought using the group’s money while showing them plenty of extra money. Awestruck, they ask about when they get paid, which angers Johnnie and she immediately fires them before driving away. Al and two other members promptly quit the group.

Shortly after, Melvin tells Otis that Eddie and Paul recently left their own group and are interested in joining them. Otis is reluctant, but ultimately accepts when Al rejoins the group. With this new line-up, they rename themselves the Elgins. Paul teaches them how to dance and becomes their unofficial choreographer, while Eddie becomes their falsetto singer. In March 1961, Otis goes to Motown Studios to meet Berry Gordy. Berry asks the group to come up with a better group name. After waiting outside the studio for hours coming up with a new name, a secretary named Martha Reeves finds them outside and calls them in to meet Berry. He asks them for their name, to which Otis replies "The Temptations".

Berry likes the name and agrees to hear them sing. After hearing them perform "Oh Mother of Mine" (which would become their debut single for Motown) Berry enthusiastically signs them. The group is now in high spirits and make a pact to never leave the group. Otis arrives home to find out that Josephine is pregnant, and although he is shocked, he promises to take responsibility. Otis and Josephine were married shortly after and later gave birth to their son, Lamont. While the group made moderately successful records such as "Paradise" and "I Want a Love I Can See" as well as getting real choreography from Cholly Atkins, they were known as "The hitless Temptations" during their first three years at Motown. The group start to doubt themselves with Al becoming more volatile. After performing at a New Year's Eve party, Al is immediately fired from the group for assaulting Paul. The remaining four go back on stage to perform the classic party song "Shout". Jimmy Ruffin and his younger brother David Ruffin go onstage, singing along with the group. The group is impressed with the duo's singing, especially David's. After the party, all of them (except for Jimmy) go to Melvin's mother's house to eat. While they eat and talk, the four invite David to join, which he accepts. They make a toast to the future success of The Temptations.

In January 1964, the group goes to Hitsville to record "The Way You Do the Things You Do". Shortly after the song hits the charts, the group goes on tour with various other Motown artists, such as The Vandellas and Marvin Gaye. In November 1964, Smokey writes them another song called "My Girl". The song debuts early the next year and becomes a massive success, reaching number one on the charts. The group enjoys their newfound success and wealth, spending money on themselves and their loved ones.

By early 1966, however, David becomes arrogant and attempts to take sole credit for the group's success. He also begins using drugs and starts showing up late for rehearsals and meetings, if at all. Soon after recording "Ain't Too Proud to Beg", Otis and Melvin pay David a visit, warning him to clean up his act or else be fired. Berry then introduces the group to their new manager Shelly Berger. Shelly plans to expand the Temptations' fanbase to the mainstream white audience. After some reluctance and consideration, they agree and are put on a month-long tour with The Supremes. The tour is successful and gets them to the Copacabana, although David considers his friend Flynn to be his new manager instead of Shelly. Flynn informs the group that David wants to change their name to "David Ruffin & The Temptations" or else he will not perform, which they reject. David shows up anyway to perform "I'm Losing You" before leaving in a separate limo. After the show, all of the others but Eddie vote to kick him out. David rushes to Hitsville in his limo. While the four watch from a window, Shelly meets David outside and hands him a note informing him of their decision. David immediately gets angry and yells at them through the window before driving off, after which Melvin rhetorically asks "So now what"?

=== Part two (November 2, 1998) ===
Later in 1968, the Temptations hire their friend Dennis Edwards as a replacement for David. It is around this time that the group starts recording psychedelic soul songs such as "Cloud Nine". During a performance, the group is about to sing "Ain't Too Proud to Beg" when David goes onstage to take the microphone away from Dennis before singing. The others go along to save face but then get security guards to escort David out. By 1969, Paul develops a drinking problem and Melvin is diagnosed with rheumatoid arthritis in his legs, yet both continue performing. Otis and Josephine also get a divorce. As Paul's condition worsens, the others begin to consider whether Paul should retire temporarily. Eddie is against this. In November 1970, Eddie visits David, who begins to turn him against Otis and Melvin while giving him his first shot of cocaine. After Paul becomes well enough to sing again, The Temptations record a song called "Just My Imagination". With Eddie leaving and Paul being too sick to tour, the group replaces them with Richard Street. Later, Otis and his son Lamont visit Paul at his house. Paul asks Otis to rejoin the group while he nearly falls demonstrating his dancing skills. In June 1972, Norman Whitfield writes the song "Papa Was a Rolling Stone". In a montage set to the song, Paul is seen struggling with his addiction while fighting with his wife before committing suicide in a parking lot. Eddie reunites with the others at the funeral, with Melvin telling him that they will always be family.

By 1977, the Temptations have moved from Detroit to Los Angeles and have been hit with a dry spell in their career. The group, now with Otis and Melvin as the only remaining original members, fires Shelly before leaving Motown to record an album for Atlantic Records. Eddie is still making hit songs while David is also under a dry spell. One day, while Melvin is helping a woman with her grocery bags, a thief gets in his car and tries to start it. When Melvin tries to stop him, the thief shoots him in both of his legs before kicking him out and driving off. In the hospital, Melvin tells Otis to go on tour without him to make some much needed money. After the tour, Otis goes back to Detroit with Lamont to visit his mother, who tells him that she has cancer.

In 1980, Melvin's legs are still recovering and the group leaves Atlantic Records. Eddie's success is fading and he is reduced to playing in small nightclubs. While performing one night, Eddie spots David in the audience, brings him on stage and they sing together. After everyone leaves, Eddie and David share a drink at the bar and agree to start their own faction of The Temptations with Dennis Edwards, who was fired from the original group in 1978. Otis and Melvin move back to Detroit to rejoin Motown as well as rehire Shelly. Motown becomes interested in setting up a reunion tour between both sets of The Temptations.

By 1982, the tour is officially underway and both sets of Temptations come together to rehearse and become reacquainted. While on tour, Josephine calls and informs Otis that Lamont died in a construction accident. After Lamont's funeral, Otis' grief gets the better of him and David's drug addiction starts to trigger his destructive nature.

In 1989, The Temptations are inducted into the Rock and Roll Hall of Fame. At the ceremony, Otis and Melvin are reunited with David, Eddie, and Dennis. Despite their past squabbles and rivalries, for one moment, they are all friends again as they accept their honor and remember Paul.

In June 1991, a dead body is found in front of a hospital. After a week in the morgue, the body is finally identified as that of David Ruffin, dead of an apparent drug overdose. Eddie dies soon after of lung cancer in October 1992.

In February 1995, Otis and Melvin, the latter now in a wheelchair, visit Melvin's mother. While preparing to eat dinner, Melvin, despite being in a wheelchair, volunteers to get short ribs from the kitchen. While he's gone, Melvin's mother thanks Otis for taking care of Melvin and keeping The Temptations together. The two then call for Melvin, but he doesn't respond. They go into the kitchen and find him unresponsive. Many people show up at the funeral, including Smokey Robinson, who sings his song "Really Gonna Miss You".

The film ends with the "classic five" Temptations (Otis, Melvin, Eddie, Paul, and David) in their youth, singing "My Girl" on a stage. At the end of the song, they take a bow, with Otis saying in a voice-over "Temptations, forever."

== Afterwards ==
The miniseries was a ratings success with 45 million viewers in total watching the two-part series; the first half alone averaged a 15 rating/23 share in Nielsen ratings. Arkush won a 1999 Emmy award for Outstanding Directing for a Miniseries or a Movie. The miniseries has been subsequently rerun on the VH1 cable television network and released to VHS and DVD. The VHS release notably omitted a few scenes which had previously aired on the television premiere. One such scene includes David Ruffin, clearly under the influence of drugs and his ego, becoming belligerent during a picnic celebration with the other members of the group. The removal of this scene is possibly due to the ensuing suit.

Otis Williams' ex-wife Josephine Miles, Melvin Franklin's mother Rose Franklin, Johnnie Mae Matthews, and on David Ruffin's behalf, the Ruffin family, filed suit against Williams, Shelly Berger, David V. Picker, Motown, De Passe Entertainment, Hallmark Entertainment, and NBC for use of their likenesses in the film, defamation of character, and emotional distress because of the inaccurate depictions of events. They also alleged that the miniseries misportrayed them and/or their relatives and twisted facts. The judges ruled in favor of the defendants, and the ruling was upheld when the plaintiffs appealed in 2001. Otis Williams later claimed that while his book was the source material for the film, he did not have a great deal of control over how the material was presented.

== Cast ==
=== Classic Five Members and relatives ===
- Charles Malik Whitfield as Otis Williams, founder and leader of Otis Williams & the Distants and later co-founder (with Eddie Kendricks and Paul Williams, of The Primes) of the group that would become known as The Temptations. He conflicts with some of his group mates, particularly David Ruffin, Elbridge Bryant, and Eddie Kendricks, over group leadership and other internal issues. Otis Williams is the only original member of The Temptations who is still living, and still performs with the group.
  - Tina Lifford as Hazel, Otis' mother.
  - Harold Surratt as Edgar, Otis' stepfather.
  - Gina Ravera as Josephine (née Rogers), Otis' wife during the 1960s and the mother of their son Lamont.
  - Stevland Parks as Lamont, Otis and Josephine's son (portrayed at age 12)
  - Chrystal Bates as Mrs. Rogers, Josephine's mother.
- D. B. Woodside as Melvin "Blue" Franklin, Otis' best friend, and a bass singer for both Otis Williams & the Distants and The Temptations for over four decades. Shy and soft-spoken, he secretly struggles with arthritis over the years, & there is some implication that, as a result of his condition, he may be addicted to various pain medications. Outside of founding member Otis Williams, Franklin was the only member of the Temptations who did not quit or get fired from the group during his tenure. Franklin died in 1995.
  - Jenifer Lewis as "Mama Rose", Melvin's mother.
- Terron Brooks as Eddie "Cornbread" Kendricks, a member of The Primes and The Temptations' original first tenor/falsetto and co-lead singer. After quitting the group in 1971, Eddie becomes a solo singer and later joins forces with fellow ex-Temptation David Ruffin. A lifelong chain smoker, Kendricks died of lung cancer in 1992 (this event is not portrayed in the miniseries, but is referenced near the end of Part Two).
- Christian Payton as Paul Williams, a member of The Primes and the Temptations' original lead singer, who succumbs to alcoholism and sickle cell anemia, forcing his retirement from the act in 1971. He died by suicide two years later.
  - Rhonda Ross Kendrick as Maxine, Paul's wife
- Leon Robinson as David Ruffin, The Temptations' lead singer from 1964 to 1968, whose ego leads the others to force him out of the group. Addicted to cocaine & later crack, Ruffin died of a drug overdose in 1991.
  - Lamman Rucker as Jimmy Ruffin, David's older brother and a Motown performer.
  - Nyjah Moore as Tammi Terrell, David's girlfriend and a Motown performer.

=== Other Temptations Members ===
- Charles Ley as Dennis Edwards, The Temptations' lead singer in the late 1960s and 1970s. He later joins forces with David and Eddie when they form a Temptations splinter group in the 1980s.
- J. August Richards as Richard Street, a member of Otis Williams & the Distants, who later replaces Paul Williams in The Temptations.
- Chaz Lamar Shepherd as Elbridge "Al"/"Bones" Bryant, Otis' high school friend and a member of both Otis Williams & the Distants and The Temptations. Having a day job as a milk man, Al becomes restless and moody as the Temptations struggle to find their big break, and is fired in December 1963.
- Benjamin J. Cain Jr. as Glenn Leonard, the Temptations' first tenor in the 1980s.
- Jonnie Brown as Damon Harris, the Temptations' first tenor in the 1970s after Eddie quits the act.

=== Others ===
- Alan Rosenberg as Shelly Berger, the Temptations' manager.
- Obba Babatundé as Berry Gordy, founder of Motown Records.
- Erik Michael Tristan as a young Smokey Robinson, the lead singer of The Miracles and The Temptations' primary songwriter and producer during the early 1960s.
  - The real-life Smokey Robinson appears as himself in a cameo at the end of Part Two, where he sings at Melvin's funeral.
- Vanessa Bell Calloway as Johnnie Mae Matthews, producer and manager for Otis Williams & the Distants.
- Mel Jackson as Norman Whitfield, The Temptations' primary producer and songwriter during the late 1960s and early 1970s.
- Adam Lazarre-White as Flynn, David's driver and self-appointed manager.
- Christopher Reid as Joltin' Joe, a radio DJ who summons The Distants for Johnnie Mae Matthews
- Melissa Mercedes Cardello as Florence Ballard of The Primettes/The Supremes. She begins an affair with Otis while on the Motor Town Revue in 1964.
- Bianca Lawson as Diana Ross of The Primettes/The Supremes.
- Taifa Harris as Mary Wilson of The Primettes/The Supremes.
- N'Tasha A. Pierre as Martha Reeves, a Motown performer and secretary.
- Ricky Fanté as Marvin Gaye, a Motown performer.
- Russell Clark as Cholly Atkins, Motown's in-house choreographer.
- Vincent A. Ponder as James 'Pee-Wee' Crawford, a member of Otis Williams & the Distants.

== Awards ==
Year	Award	Category	Recipient	Result
1999	Motion Picture Sound Editors	Best Sound Editing - Television Mini-Series - Music	Kevin Crehan (music editor) and Tom Villano (music and scoring editor) (For episode "Night One")	Won
1999	Motion Picture Sound Editors	Best Sound Editing - Television Mini-Series - Dialogue & ADR	Suzanne Angel, Mark Friedgen, G. Michael Graham, Anton Holden, Kristi Johns, Mark R. La Pointe, Michael Lyle, Scott A. Tinsley, and Tim Terusa (For episode "Night One")	Won
1999	NAACP Image Awards	Outstanding Television Movie or Mini-Series	—N/a	Won
1999	Primetime Emmy Award	Outstanding Directing for a Miniseries or Movie	Allan Arkush	Won

== Notes ==
1. Eddie Kendricks died in October 1992.
