= Solid Rock (The Temptations album) =

Studio album by The Temptations
- Released: January 11, 1972
- Recorded: May 1971 – January 1972
- Studios: Hitsville USA, Detroit
- Genres: Soul, psychedelic soul
- Length: 38:48
- Label: Gordy
- Producer: Norman Whitfield

The Temptations chronology
Sky's the Limit (1971)	Solid Rock (1972)	All Directions (1972)

Singles from Solid Rock
- 1. "It's Summer" Released: June 24, 1971; 2. "Superstar (Remember How You Got Where You Are)" Released: October 17, 1971; 3. "Take a Look Around" Released: February 3, 1972

Professional ratings
Review scores
Source	Rating
AllMusic	3/5 stars
Christgau's Record Guide	C

Solid Rock is the fifteenth studio album by the Temptations for the Gordy (Motown) label, produced by Norman Whitfield. The LP was the first made primarily without founding members and original lead singers Eddie Kendricks and Paul Williams. Frustrated by conflicts and fights with Temptations Otis Williams and Melvin Franklin, and producer Whitfield's steadfast insistence on producing psychedelic soul for the group when they really wanted to sing ballads, Kendricks had quit the act and negotiated a solo deal with Motown's Tamla label.

Paul Williams, on the other hand, had fallen ill due to complications from sickle-cell disease and six years of untreated alcoholism. Physically incapable of performing any longer, Williams followed his doctor's advice and retired from the act, although he remained on the Temptations' payroll as a choreographer until his death, August 17, 1973. Williams's final Temptations recording, "It's Summer", is the only song on Solid Rock that includes his vocals. The album reached number one on the Billboard R&B album chart on March 4, 1972.

== Overview ==
The Temptations group's paranoia-laced "Smiling Faces Sometimes", a Kendricks-led tune from the Sky's the Limit LP, was already slated as the follow-up to the number-one hit "Just My Imagination (Running Away with Me)". With Kendricks now gone, and with the group lacking a first tenor to take his place, Norman Whitfield was forced to change plans.

Whitfield took the temporarily four-man Temptations and re-recorded "It's Summer", the b-side to "Ball of Confusion (That's What the World Is Today)", as a replacement release. "Smiling Faces Sometimes" was instead released as a single for The Undisputed Truth, and became a Top 5 hit on the Billboard Hot 100. Meanwhile, "It's Summer" peaked at number fifty-one on the Billboard Hot 100, making it the first Temptations single to miss the Top 40 since 1963's "Farewell My Love".

Although Paul Williams kept up an alliance with the Temptations, Kendricks and fellow ex-Temptation David Ruffin vocally spoke out against the group (and Otis Williams in particular) in several 1971 interviews. As a result, the Temptations and Norman Whitfield released the single "Superstar (Remember How You Got Where You Are)", which addressed the rivalry and called Kendricks and Ruffin out as sell-outs. "Superstar" was the first Temptations song to feature Kendricks and Williams' replacements, Damon Harris and Richard Street. Ricky Owens from the Vibrations had been the Temptations' original choice for a new first tenor, but Owens only remained with the group a few weeks before being replaced.

Solid Rock's third single, "Take a Look Around", was a Top 30 hit which showcased Harris' Kendricksesque falsetto voice alongside the leads of Richard Street, Dennis Edwards, Otis Williams, and Melvin Franklin. "Take a Look Around" and several of the album tracks, including "What It Is?" and "Stop the War Now", were more of Norman Whitfield's psychedelic soul recordings.

== Track listing ==
All tracks produced by Norman Whitfield.

Side one
No.	Title	Writer(s)	Lead singer(s)	Length
1.	"Take a Look Around"	Barrett Strong, Norman Whitfield	Dennis Edwards, Damon Harris, Richard Street, Otis Williams	2:44
2.	"Ain't No Sunshine"	Bill Withers	Street, Edwards, Harris	7:16
3.	"Stop the War Now"	Strong, Whitfield	Edwards, Melvin Franklin	12:28

Side two
No.	Title	Writer(s)	Lead singer(s)	Length
1.	"What It Is?"	Strong, Whitfield	Edwards, Harris, Street	5:15
2.	"Smooth Sailing (From Now On)"	Strong, Whitfield	Harris	2:48
3.	"Superstar (Remember How You Got Where You Are)"	Strong, Whitfield	Edwards, Harris, Franklin, Street, Williams	2:53
4.	"It's Summer"	Strong Whitfield	Edwards, Street, Franklin	2:56
5.	"The End of Our Road"	Strong, Whitfield, Roger Penzabene	Street	2:41

== Personnel ==
- Dennis Edwards – vocals (tenor/baritone)
- Melvin Franklin – vocals (bass)
- Otis Williams – vocals (second tenor)
- Damon Harris – vocals (first tenor/falsetto)(all except for “It’s Summer”)
- Richard Street – vocals (third tenor)
- Paul Williams – vocals (baritone) ("It's Summer" only)
- Norman Whitfield – producer
- Barrett Strong – lyricist
- The Funk Brothers – instrumentation
- Aaron Smith – drums

== Charts ==
=== Weekly charts ===
Chart (1972)	Peak position
UK Albums (OCC)	34
US Billboard 200	24
US R&B Albums	1

=== Year-end charts ===
Chart (1972)	Peak position
US R&B Albums	10

== See also ==
- List of number-one R&B albums of 1972 (U.S.)
