= A Tear from a Woman's Eyes =

"A Tear from a Woman’s Eye"

Song by The Temptations

from the album Emperors of Soul
- Recorded: Hitsville USA (Studio A); January 6, 1964
- Genre: Soul, R&B, Pop
- Length: 2:39
- Label: Gordy
- Songwriter(s): Holland–Dozier–Holland
- Producer(s): Lamont Dozier, Brian Holland

"A Tear from a Woman’s Eye" is a 1964 song written and produced by Motown's main production team Holland–Dozier–Holland, and recorded by The Temptations for the Gordy (Motown) label. It competed with several songs, including "The Way You Do the Things You Do" and "Just Let Me Know" in an effort to become the A-side to the group's seventh single (losing out to the former). It was recorded just three days before the hit song that it lost the nomination to, which was "The Way You Do the Things You Do". The group's falsetto Eddie Kendricks as the song's narrator, compares several sad situations to a woman crying, which he says is "the saddest thing I've ever seen." This would be the first of only two times (the other being "Just One Last Look") in which H-D-H would produce any material for the group, who would be one of the few major Motown acts never to release a single produced by the trio, due to Berry Gordy, Jr., Smokey Robinson, and (later) Norman Whitfield having a tight hold on the group's released material. (Only Edward Holland, Jr. would have any success with the group, as Whitfield's co-writer.) This song would go unreleased until the 1994 box-set "Emperors of Soul", while "Just One Last Look" would be released as album filler on "The Temptations with a Lot o' Soul". The group would also later cover The Vandellas' "I'm Ready for Love", which would be released on "The Temptations in a Mellow Mood" but not produced by H-D-H.

== Personnel ==
- Lead vocals by Eddie Kendricks
- Background vocals by Melvin Franklin, Paul Williams, David Ruffin, and Otis Williams
- Instrumentation by The Funk Brothers
