= The Temptations in a Mellow Mood =

Studio album by The Temptations
- Released: November 27, 1967
- Recorded: April – October 1967
- Genre: Pop
- Length: 38:35
- Label: Gordy; GS 924
- Producer: Frank Wilson, Jeffrey Bowen

The Temptations chronology
The Temptations with a Lot o' Soul (1967)	The Temptations in a Mellow Mood (1967)	The Temptations Wish It Would Rain (1968)

Professional ratings
Review scores
Source	Rating
AllMusic	3/5 stars
The Encyclopedia of Popular Music	3/5 stars
The Rolling Stone Album Guide	2/5 stars

The Temptations in a Mellow Mood is the sixth studio album by the Temptations, released in 1967 by Gordy Records. Composed primarily of pop standards such as "Ol' Man River" and "For Once in My Life" (later a major hit for Motown labelmate Stevie Wonder), and similar songs written by Holland-Dozier-Holland and other Motown staff songwriters, the Mellow Mood album was part of Motown chief Berry Gordy's crossover plans for the group. Gordy wanted the Temptations, already the most popular male group among black audiences, to attract a large white fanbase and be able to secure playdates at supper clubs like the Copacabana, where the group had first performed in the summer of 1967.

The Temptations themselves, and Paul Williams in particular, were worried about appearing as sell-outs to their black fans and the radio DJs who had made them popular in the first place. However, both pop and soul fans responded to the Mellow Mood album, and the Temptations reached Gordy's desired goal of crossing over to white audiences. "Ol' Man River" was already present in the Temptations' performance repertoire as bass Melvin Franklin's solo spot, and "For Once in My Life" soon became a solo showcase for Williams, who performed a particularly acclaimed version of the song for the TCB television special in late 1968. The group would revisit the idea of an album of pop standards in 1995 with For Lovers Only.

== Track listing ==
=== Side one ===
1. "Hello Young Lovers" (Richard Rodgers, Oscar Hammerstein II) (All lead & background vocals: The Temptations) 2:58
2. "A Taste of Honey" (Ric Marlow, Bobby Scott) (lead singers: Eddie Kendricks, David Ruffin) 2:05
3. "For Once in My Life" (Ron Miller, Orlando Murden) (lead singers: Paul Williams; last line: Otis Williams) 3:05
4. "Somewhere" (Leonard Bernstein, Stephen Sondheim) (lead singer: David Ruffin) 4:15
5. "Ol' Man River" (Hammerstein, Jerome Kern) (lead singer: Melvin Franklin; intro: Eddie Kendricks, Otis Williams, David Ruffin, Paul Williams) 4:26
6. "I'm Ready for Love" (Brian Holland, Lamont Dozier, Eddie Holland) (lead singer: David Ruffin) 2:23

=== Side two ===
1. "Try to Remember" (Tom Jones, Harvey Schmidt) (lead singer: Eddie Kendricks) 3:03
2. "Who Can I Turn To (When Nobody Needs Me)" (Leslie Bricusse, Anthony Newley) (lead singer: Paul Williams) 3:24
3. "What Now My Love?" (Gilbert Bécaud, Pierre Delanoë, Carl Sigman) (English lead vocals: David Ruffin; French dialogue: Melvin Franklin) 3:38
4. "That's Life" (Dean Kay, Kelly Gordon) (lead singers: Paul Williams; bridge and outro: David Ruffin) 2:58
5. "With These Hands" (Benny Davis, Abner Silver) (lead singer: Eddie Kendricks) 3:40
6. "The Impossible Dream" (Joe Darion, Mitch Leigh) (lead singer: David Ruffin) 3:23

== Personnel ==
The Temptations

- David Ruffin – falsetto/tenor/baritone vocals
- Eddie Kendricks –first tenor/falsetto vocals
- Paul Williams – second tenor/baritone vocals
- Melvin Franklin – bass vocals
- Otis Williams – second tenor/baritone vocals

Technical

- Frank Wilson – producer, executive producer
- Jeffrey Bowen – producer
- H. B. Barnum – arrangements
- Oliver Nelson – arrangements
- Don Costa – arrangements

== See also ==
- For Lovers Only
