= The Temptations Christmas Card =

The Temptations' Christmas Card

Studio album (Christmas) by The Temptations
- Released: October 30, 1970
- Recorded: October 1968 – October 1969
- Genres: Christmas, soul
- Length: 32:27
- Labels: Gordy; GS 951
- Producers: Clay McMurray, Barrett Strong

The Temptations chronology
Live at London's Talk of the Town (1970)	The Temptations' Christmas Card (1970)	Sky's the Limit (1971)

The Temptations' Christmas Card is a 1970 Christmas album by The Temptations for the Gordy (Motown) label. The album was released on October 30, 1970. It's also the group's first holiday release, it features each Temptation leading on various popular Christmas standards and original Christmas songs.

== Reception ==
Professional ratings
Review scores
Source	Rating
Allmusic	3/5 stars

A brief review in Billboard recommended this release for having a "special touch of seasonal joie de vivre".

A 1987 review of the best-selling Christmas albums by Ebony notes that this is one of the best-selling from Motown.

== Track listing ==
All tracks produced by Barret Strong and Clay McMurray

Side one
No.	Title	Writer(s)	Lead singer(s)	Length
1.	"Rudolph the Red-Nosed Reindeer"	Johnny Marks	Eddie Kendricks, Melvin Franklin; intro: Paul Williams, Dennis Edwards, Otis Williams, Franklin	2:40
2.	"My Christmas Tree"	Jimmy Webb	Kendricks	3:21
3.	"Santa Claus Is Coming to Town"	Haven Gillespie, J. Fred Coots	Edwards	3:26
4.	"Silent Night"	[Traditional]	Kendricks	2:26
5.	"Someday at Christmas"	Ron Miller, B. Wells	Franklin	3:27

Side two
No.	Title	Writer(s)	Lead singer(s)	Length
1.	"White Christmas"	Irving Berlin	Kendricks, P. Williams, Edwards	4:22
2.	"Let It Snow! Let It Snow! Let It Snow!"	Sammy Cahn, Jule Styne	Edwards	3:25
3.	"Silver Bells"	Jay Livingstone, Ray Evans	Kendricks, Franklin	2:11
4.	"The Christmas Song"	Mel Torme, Robert Wells	O. Williams	3:30
5.	"Little Drummer Boy"	Katherine Kennicott Davis	Edwards, Kendricks, P. Williams, O. Williams, Franklin	3:15

== Personnel ==
- Dennis Edwards – tenor/baritone vocals
- Eddie Kendricks – first tenor/falsetto vocals
- Paul Williams – second tenor/baritone vocals
- Melvin Franklin – bass vocals
- Otis Williams – second tenor/baritone vocals
- The Funk Brothers – instrumentation

== See also ==
- Give Love at Christmas (1980)
