= Give Love at Christmas =

Studio album (Christmas) by The Temptations
- Released: August 14, 1980
- Recorded: 1980
- Genres: Christmas, soul
- Length: 34:11
- Labels: Gordy; G8-998M1
- Producers: Gil Askey; Harold Johnson; Teddy Randazzo

The Temptations chronology
Power (1980)	Give Love at Christmas (1980)	The Temptations (1981)

Professional ratings
Review scores
Source	Rating
AllMusic	4/5 stars
The Rolling Stone Album Guide	1/5 stars

Give Love at Christmas is a Christmas album by the Temptations, released on August 14, 1980 via Gordy Records. The group's second holiday release following 1970's The Temptations Christmas Card, it features each Temptation leading on various popular Christmas carols and original Christmas songs. The album includes versions of The Jackson 5's "Give Love on Christmas Day", "The Little Drummer Boy", "This Christmas", and "Silent Night", alongside originals written or co-written by Motown founder Berry Gordy, Jr. and Motown star and vice-president Smokey Robinson.

The Temptations' 1980 recording of "Silent Night" (punctuated by bass singer Melvin Franklin's sign-off of "Merry Christmas, from the Temptations!") became an enduring staple of rhythm and blues radio during the holiday season. In addition to "Silent Night", "The Christmas Song" and "Little Drummer Boy" also was previously recorded on their previous Christmas album The Temptations Christmas Card.

== Track listing ==
Side one and two, tracks one and three produced by Harold Johnson, side one, tracks two and four and side two, track four produced by Gil Asky and side two, track two produced by Teddy Randazzo.

Side one
No.	Title	Writer(s)	Lead singer(s)	Length
1.	"Give Love on Christmas Day"	Berry Gordy Jr., Alphonso Mizell, Freddie Perren, Deke Richards	Glenn Leonard	3:36
2.	"The Christmas Song"	Mel Tormé, Robert Wells	Dennis Edwards, Richard Street, Otis Williams, Melvin Franklin	5:08
3.	"Love Comes With Christmas"	Alice Johnson, Marv Johnson	Street	3:45
4.	"The Little Drummer Boy"	Katherine Kennicott Davis, Henry Onorati, Harry Simeone	Leonard, Street, Williams, Edwards, and Franklin	4:08

Side two
No.	Title	Writer(s)	Lead singer(s)	Length
5.	"This Christmas"	Donny Hathaway, Nadine McKinnor	Edwards	4:26
6.	"Everything for Christmas"	Gordy, Teddy Randazzo	Street	4:12
7.	"Christmas Everyday"	Smokey Robinson	Franklin	2:56
8.	"Silent Night"	Franz Xaver Gruber, Joseph Mohr	Edwards, Leonard, Franklin	6:00

- Note: Some pressings incorrectly list The Christmas Song on the label as being 5:36. This is incorrect.

== Personnel ==
- Dennis Edwards: tenor/baritone vocals
- Glenn Leonard: first tenor/falsetto vocals
- Richard Street: second tenor vocals
- Melvin Franklin: bass vocals
- Otis Williams: second tenor/baritone vocals

== See also ==
- The Temptations Christmas Card (1970)
