= Sky's the Limit (The Temptations album) =

Studio album by the Temptations
- Released: April 22, 1971
- Recorded: August 1970 – March 1971
- Studios: Hitsville USA, Detroit
- Genres: Soul, psychedelic soul
- Length: 43:26
- Labels: Gordy; GS 957
- Producer: Norman Whitfield

The Temptations chronology
The Temptations Christmas Card (1970)	Sky's the Limit (1971)	Solid Rock (1972)

Singles from Sky's the Limit
- 1. "Ungena Za Ulimwengu (Unite the World)" Released: September 15, 1970; 2. "Just My Imagination (Running Away with Me)" Released: January 13, 1971

Professional ratings
Review scores
Source	Rating
AllMusic	3/5 stars
Christgau's Record Guide	B

Sky's the Limit is the fourteenth studio album by the Temptations, released in 1971 through Gordy Records. The album includes the #1 hit "Just My Imagination (Running Away with Me)", the Top 40 hit "Ungena Za Ulimwengu (Unite the World)", and the original version of "Smiling Faces Sometimes", later a Top 5 hit for The Undisputed Truth.

In addition, Sky's the Limit features the final Temptations recordings for founding member Eddie Kendricks, the main lead vocalist on "Just My Imagination". Before the release of the album, Kendricks departed the group for a solo career. His best friend Paul Williams would soon follow him out of the group due mainly to health issues.

== Overview ==
"Unite the World" (its main title "Ungena Za Ulimwengu" is a Swahili translation of its parenthetical title), the album's first single, was the first Temptations single since 1964's "I'll Be in Trouble" not to make the Billboard Pop Singles Top 30. Its relative failure signaled the beginning of the end of the Temptations and Norman Whitfield's psychedelic soul recordings; while more Sly and the Family Stone-inspired psychedelic records would turn up on the next four Temptations albums, Whitfield began, for the first time in three years, once again releasing soul ballads as singles for the group. The first of these was Sky's the Limit's second single, "Just My Imagination (Running Away with Me)", which Whitfield and Barrett Strong had written in 1969 but shelved. "Just My Imagination" became the group's third number-one hit.

The album tracks show Whitfield's gravitation back towards a ballad format: fully half of the LP is made up of such tracks. Previous Whitfield co-compositions such as "Gonna Keep on Tryin' (Till I Win Your Love)" (originally recorded by Edwin Starr, later The Temptations; from The Tempts' Cloud Nine album), "I'm the Exception to the Rule" (recorded by The Velvelettes in 1964), and "Throw a Farewell Kiss" (also a Velvelettes original) were revived and recorded for this album.

Sky's the Limit contains two extended-length tracks: "Love Can Be Anything (Can't Nothing Be Love But Love)" runs nine minutes, while "Smiling Faces Sometimes" runs twelve minutes, mostly instrumental passages.

== Background ==
Just My Imagination (Running Away with Me)
Album version of "Just My Imagination (Running Away with Me)", performed by The Temptations.

During most of 1970, the year "Unite the World" was released and "Just My Imagination" was recorded, Paul Williams had been in and out of hospital care, as complications from both alcoholism and sickle-cell disease caused him to become seriously ill. Richard Street, a former bandmate of Otis Williams in The Distants and current lead singer of Motown's The Monitors, was proposed as a replacement for Paul Williams.

Eddie Kendricks also began to withdraw from the group; he regularly quarreled with either Otis Williams or his best friend Melvin Franklin, and the fights often became violent. Kendricks began spending more time with his friend David Ruffin, former lead singer of the Temptations. Ruffin had been fired from the act in June 1968 because of unprofessional behavior and perceived ego problems, and Kendricks was the only member who continued an alliance with Ruffin. In fact, Kendricks suggested more than once that Ruffin should be invited back into the group, an idea which the other members strongly objected to. By the fall of 1970, Kendricks decided that he should leave the group and go solo.

During a November 1970 engagement at the Copacabana nightclub in New York City, tensions came to a head. Otis Williams' mother had just died, and his voice cracked onstage during a performance, drawing Kendricks' ire. Attempting to avoid yet another fight, Williams and Melvin Franklin left the Copa immediately after the show, infuriating Kendricks to the point that he left as well and didn't return for the next show. The rift became irreparable at that point, and it was mutually agreed by all parties involved that Kendricks would be leaving The Temptations.

"Smiling Faces Sometimes" was planned as the third single from Sky's the Limit, but when Eddie Kendricks, the song's lead singer, quit the group in early April 1971, Whitfield had to shift plans. "Smiling Faces" was given to The Undisputed Truth, whose recording of the song became a Top 5 pop hit, while the Temptations, reduced to a quartet while searching for a Kendricks replacement, re-recorded "It's Summer", from the Psychedelic Shack album, as a single. "I'm the Exception to the Rule" from Sky's the Limit was issued as "It's Summer's" b-side.

Kendricks arranged a solo deal with Motown's Tamla label, and would go on to have hits such as "Keep on Truckin'" (1973) and "Boogie Down" (1974), while Paul Williams retired from the stage and assisted the Temptations with choreography until committing suicide in 1973.

== Track listing ==
All selections written by Norman Whitfield and Barrett Strong, except for "Throw a Farewell Kiss", written by Whitfield and Edward Holland, Jr. All selections produced by Whitfield.

=== Side A ===
#	Title	Length	Lead
1	"Gonna Keep on Tryin' (Till I Win Your Love)"	3:59	Eddie Kendricks
2	"Just My Imagination (Running Away with Me)"	3:48	Eddie Kendricks and Paul Williams
3	"I'm the Exception to the Rule"	3:27	Eddie Kendricks and Dennis Edwards (spoken introduction by Otis Williams)
4	"Smiling Faces Sometimes"	12:43	Eddie Kendricks and Dennis Edwards

=== Side B ===
#	Title	Length	Lead
5	"Man"	2:41	Eddie Kendricks
6	"Throw a Farewell Kiss"	3:11	Dennis Edwards
7	"Ungena Za Ulimwengu (Unite the World)"	4:31	Dennis Edwards and Melvin Franklin
8	"Love Can Be Anything (Can't Nothing Be Love But Love)"	9:23	Dennis Edwards, Eddie Kendricks, and Melvin Franklin

== Personnel ==
The Temptations

- Dennis Edwards - vocals (tenor/baritone)
- Eddie Kendricks - vocals (first tenor/falsetto)
- Paul Williams - vocals (baritone)
- Melvin Franklin - vocals (bass)
- Otis Williams - vocals (second tenor)

with:

- Norman Whitfield - producer, songwriter
- Barrett Strong - lyricist
- The Funk Brothers - instrumentation
- Aaron Smith - drums

== Charts ==
Chart (1971)	Peak position
Canadian Albums (RPM)	73
US Billboard 200	16
