= I Couldn't Cry If I Wanted To =

Single by Eddie Holland
- A-side: "I'm on the Outside Looking In"
- B-side: "I Couldn't Cry If I Wanted To"
- Released: October 16, 1963
- Recorded: Hitsville USA (Studio A); November 2, 1962 & April 19, 1963
- Genre: R&B
- Label: Motown 1049
- Songwriter(s): Norman Whitfield; Eddie Holland
- Producer(s): Norman Whitfield

Eddie Holland singles chronology
"Baby Shake" (1963)	"I'm On The Outside Looking In" / "I Couldn't Cry If I Wanted To" (1963)	"Leaving Here" (1963)

"I Couldn't Cry If I Wanted To"

Single by the Temptations
- A-side: "(I Know) I'm Losing You"
- B-side: "I Couldn't Cry If I Wanted To"
- Released: November 2, 1966
- Recorded: Hitsville USA (Studio A); November 2, 1962 (Remixed June 7, 1966)
- Genre: R&B/Soul/Pop
- Length: 2:31
- Label: Gordy; G 7057
- Songwriter(s): Norman Whitfield; Edward Holland, Jr.
- Producer(s): Norman Whitfield

The Temptations singles chronology
"Beauty Is Only Skin Deep" (1966)	"(I Know) I'm Losing You" / "I Couldn't Cry If I Wanted To" (1966)	"All I Need" (1967)

"I Couldn't Cry If I Wanted To" is a 1962 Motown song written by Edward Holland, Jr. and Norman Whitfield. It would later be released as B-sides for singles by the Temptations (in 1966) and Holland himself (in 1963), both of which were produced by Whitfield.

In the Temptations case, their recording had spent four years in the vault before being remixed in June 1966 and released that November, making it the last recording from the period of the original lineup to be put on a single (as a B-side). It is also one of the few B-sides that was led by Paul Williams since David Ruffin, whose vocals are not on this track due to being recorded before he joined, took his spot as the group's main lead singer.

Cash Box said that the Temptations version has a "powerful soul sound."

== Personnel ==
=== Temptations version ===
- Lead vocals by Paul Williams
- Background vocals by Eddie Kendricks, Melvin Franklin, Al Bryant and Otis Williams
- Produced by Norman Whitfield
- Instrumentation by the Funk Brothers

=== Eddie Holland version ===
- Lead vocals by Eddie Holland
- Background vocals by the Andantes (Jackie Hicks, Marlene Barrow, and Louvain Demps) and the Love-Tones
- Produced by Norman Whitfield
- Instrumentation by the Funk Brothers
