= I Want a Love I Can See =

Single by The Temptations

from the album Meet the Temptations
- B-side: "The Further You Look, the Less You See"
- Released: March 18, 1963
- Recorded: Hitsville USA (Studio A); January 31 and February 1, 1963
- Genre: Soul, R&B
- Length: 2:30
- Label: Gordy; G 7015
- Songwriter: Smokey Robinson
- Producer: Smokey Robinson

The Temptations singles chronology
"Paradise" / "Slow Down Heart" (1962)	"I Want a Love I Can See" (1963)	"Farewell My Love" (1963)

"I Want a Love I Can See" is a 1963 single by The Temptations for the Gordy (Motown) label. The single was the group's first A-side to be written and produced by Miracles lead singer Smokey Robinson. Robinson had previously written the B-side "Slow Down Heart", but for over the past year Berry Gordy, Jr. had been The Temptations' main producer.

== Overview ==
Lead singer Paul Williams, in the role of the song’s narrator, talks about what he thinks is true love.

I want a love I can see
That's the only kind that means a thing to me
Don't want a love you have to tell me about
That kind of loving I can sure do without

This single not only marked Williams return as lead on the A-side, but would also be the only one with him as the sole lead (although there are a few B-sides with him only as lead). During the previous year, fellow group member Eddie Kendricks was given the lead on the singles' A-sides with little success. By early 1963, the Tempts was a regional R&B favorite with their most successful single being "Dream Come True", a Top 30 R&B hit, but they couldn’t make the Billboard Hot 100 charts. Because of this, the group was given the nickname "The Hitless Temptations", while Motown continued to try to give them a top 20 hit on both the Pop and R&B charts. Robinson by this time had become one of Motown's top producers and songwriters, delivering hits such acts as Mary Wells and his own group The Miracles (and a few minor charters to sister group The Supremes), and when the Tempts were given this song they were sure this would be the hit they needed. According to some sources, including Otis Williams autobiography, bass singer Melvin Franklin did not record vocals on either side of this single, as he was visiting family in Alabama. However, this cannot be substantiated by official Motown studio records.

Although "I Want a Love I Can See" Initially did not chart nationally, the song was a smash regional hit in some parts of the country and would continue to be used as part of the Temptations' on-stage repertoire. Eventually the song would become a big hit later reaching #2 on the US R&B chart, & #4 on Cash Box. In fact, the single ended up becoming more successful financially than the group's previous singles, as it outsold even the two charters. On the group's live performance of the song on the "Motortown Revue Live Vol. 2", Paul Williams and Elbridge "Al" Bryant exchange leads at the end of the song (one of the few times Bryant appears as lead on a song) - the part taken over by his replacement, David Ruffin on "The Temptations Live!". The group's 2001 lineup made a studio remake (renamed "A Love I Can See") for The Temptations album Awesome. Robinson would prove to have the best rapport with the group and eventually became the Temptations main producer. The song was covered by several different artists, including a mainstream version by Jennifer Love Hewitt, and there were versions by various roots reggae and lovers rock artists such as Jackie Edwards (musician), Creation Rebel ( with Headley Bennett, Style Scott, and Don Campbell (musician), Dawn Penn, and Bitty McLean. John Holt also covered the song, which was retitled "(I Want) A Love I Can Feel".

The melody and chord progression of "I Want a Love I can See" appear to have been highly influential upon the structure of Johnny Burnette's son Rocky Burnette's 1980 hit single, "Tired Of Toein' The Line".

Cash Box described the song as an "inviting mashed potatoes-styled romancer" with a "strong musical backdrop" and said that it is "right up the teeners alley."

== Personnel ==
- Lead vocals by Paul Williams and Al Bryant (live)
- Background vocals by Eddie Kendricks, Melvin Franklin, Al Bryant, and Otis Williams
- Instrumentation by The Funk Brothers

== Chart history ==
Chart (1963)	Peak position
U.S. R&B Chart	2
US Cash Box	4
