= TCB (TV program) =

Soundtrack album by Diana Ross & the Supremes with the Temptations
- Released: December 2, 1968
- Recorded: August 23 & 24, 1968
- Genres: Pop, soul, show tunes
- Length: 41:00
- Labels: Motown; MS 682
- Producers: Motown Productions, Inc. George Schlatter–Ed Friendly Productions

Diana Ross & the Supremes chronology
Love Child (1968)	TCB (1968)	Let the Sunshine In (1969)

The Temptations chronology
Diana Ross & The Supremes Join the Temptations (1968)	TCB (1968)	Live at the Copa (1968)

Professional ratings
Review scores
Source	Rating
Allmusic	4/5 stars
The Rolling Stone Album Guide	2.5/5 stars

TCB is a 1968 television special produced by Motown Productions and George Schlatter–Ed Friendly Productions of Laugh-In fame. The special is a musical revue starring Motown's two most popular groups at the time, Diana Ross & the Supremes and The Temptations. Containing a combination of showtunes, specially prepared numbers, and popular Motown hits, the special was taped before a live studio audience in August 1968 and originally broadcast December 9, 1968 on NBC, sponsored by the Timex watch corporation. The title of the program uses a then-popular acronym, "TCB", which stands for "Taking Care of Business".

Among the program's highlights were Diana Ross' "Afro Vogue" solo spot, Paul Williams' emotionally charged rendition of "For Once in My Life," a cover by both groups of the Aretha Franklin version of Otis Redding's "Respect," and then-new Temptations lead singer Dennis Edwards' lead performance on "(I Know) I'm Losing You," a song considered a signature for his predecessor, David Ruffin.

Pre-empting Laugh-In on Monday night, TCB was the first musical TV special of the rock era to air on American broadcast television. It exceeded all performance expectations, winning its timeslot in the ratings and becoming the top-rated variety show of 1968. A soundtrack album, TCB – The Original Cast Soundtrack was released a week before the special aired on December 9 and reached No. 1 on the U.S. Billboard Top 200 albums chart. It also became the third #1 album for Diana Ross and The Supremes. The first #1 was The Supremes A' Go Go in 1966 and the second was Greatest Hits in 1967.

As of June 2025, the show has not been officially released on home video, although it remains a popular bootleg among fans. Various clips are available for viewing online by streaming media, including YouTube.

The vinyl LP soundtrack album has been remastered and reissued on CD.

== Cast ==
- Diana Ross & the Supremes:
  - Diana Ross
  - Mary Wilson
  - Cindy Birdsong
- The Temptations:
  - Dennis Edwards
  - Eddie Kendricks
  - Paul Williams
  - Melvin Franklin
  - Otis Williams

== Songs in TV Special ==
1. "TCB"
2. "Stop! In the Name of Love"
3. Introduction of Diana Ross & the Supremes
4. "You Keep Me Hangin' On"
5. Introduction of the Temptations
6. "Get Ready"
7. "My Girl" Introduction of Diana Ross
8. "The Way You Do the Things You Do"
9. Medley:
  - "A Taste of Honey"
  - "Eleanor Rigby"
  - "Do You Know the Way to San Jose"
  - "Mrs. Robinson"
10. "Respect"
11. Medley:
  - "Reflections"
  - "Afro-Vogue" (dance instrumental)
12. "Somewhere"
13. "Ain't Too Proud to Beg"
14. Introduction of the Temptations
15. "Hello, Young Lovers"
16. "For Once in My Life"
17. "(I Know) I'm Losing You"
18. "With a Song in My Heart"/"Without a Song"
19. Medley:
  - "Come See About Me"
  - "My World Is Empty Without You"
  - "Baby Love"
20. "I Hear a Symphony"
21. "The Impossible Dream"

== Song list for TCB soundtrack album ==
Lead vocalists on each track are identified by superscripts: (a) Diana Ross, (b) Dennis Edwards, (c) Eddie Kendricks, (d) Paul Williams, (e) Otis Williams, (f) Temptations Ensemble

=== Side one ===
1. "TCB" (Bill Angelos, Buz Kohan) – 2:55 ^{a, f}
2. "Stop! In the Name of Love" (Holland-Dozier-Holland) – 1:12 ^{a}
3. Introduction of Diana Ross & the Supremes – 0:55
4. "You Keep Me Hangin' On" (Holland-Dozier-Holland) – 1:48 ^{a}
5. Introduction of the Temptations/"Get Ready" (Smokey Robinson) – 2:34 ^{a, c}
6. Introduction of Diana Ross/"The Way You Do the Things You Do" (Robinson, Robert Rogers) – 3:23 ^{b, a, c}
7. Medley – 5:15
  1. "A Taste of Honey" (Bobby Scot, Ric Marlow) ^{c}
  2. "Eleanor Rigby" (John Lennon, Paul McCartney) ^{a}
  3. "Do You Know the Way to San Jose" (Burt Bacharach, Hal David) ^{a}
  4. "Mrs. Robinson" (Paul Simon) ^{a, f}
8. "Respect" (Otis Redding) – 2:37 ^{d, a}
9. "Somewhere" (Leonard Bernstein, Stephen Sondheim) – 3:07 ^{a}

=== Side two ===
1. "Ain't Too Proud to Beg" (Norman Whitfield, Edward Holland Jr.) – 2:05 ^{b}
2. Introduction of the Temptations – 0:45
3. "Hello, Young Lovers" (Richard Rodgers, Oscar Hammerstein II) – 2:17 ^{f}
4. "For Once in My Life" (Ron Miller, Orlando Muller) – 3:43 ^{d, e}
5. "(I Know) I'm Losing You" (Whitfield, E. Holland) – 3:07 ^{b}
6. "With a Song in My Heart/Without a Song" (Richard Rodgers, Lorenz Hart, Vincent Youmans, Edward Eliscu, Billy Rose) – 3:00 ^{a}
7. Medley (Holland-Dozier-Holland) – 2:20 ^{a}
  1. "Come See About Me"
  2. "My World Is Empty Without You"
  3. "Baby Love"
8. "I Hear a Symphony" (Holland-Dozier-Holland) – 2:47 ^{a}
9. "The Impossible Dream" (Joe Darion, Mitch Leigh) – 3:10 ^{a, d}

== Charts ==
=== Weekly charts ===
Chart (1969)	Peak position
Canada Top Albums/CDs (RPM)	2
UK Albums (Official Charts)	11
UK R&B Albums (Record Mirror)	1
US Billboard 200	1
US Top R&B/Hip-Hop Albums (Billboard)	1

=== Year-end charts ===
Chart (1969)	Rank
US Billboard 200	27
US Top R&B/Hip-Hop Albums (Billboard)	6
US Cashbox Top 100	24

== Certifications ==
Region	Certification	Certified units/sales
United States (RIAA)	Gold	1,000,000

== Awards for TV special ==
The show received an Emmy Nomination for Outstanding Individual Achievement in Electronic Production.

== See also ==
- G.I.T. on Broadway, 1969 follow-up special
