= (You're My) Dream Come True =

1962 single by the Temptations

Single by the Temptations

from the album Meet the Temptations
- B-side: "Isn't She Pretty"
- Released: March 16, 1962
- Recorded: Hitsville USA (Studio A); January 17, 1962
- Genre: Soul, R&B, Doo-wop
- Length: 2:54
- Label: Gordy; G 7001
- Songwriter: Berry Gordy, Jr.
- Producers: Berry Gordy, Jr.

The Temptations singles chronology
"Check Yourself" (1961)	"(You're My) Dream Come True" (1962)	"Paradise" / "Slow Down Heart" (1962)

"(You're My) Dream Come True" (also known as "Dream Come True") is a 1962 single by the Temptations.

== Personnel ==
- Lead vocals by Eddie Kendricks and Melvin Franklin (ad-lib on outro)
- Background vocals by Melvin Franklin, Paul Williams, Al Bryant, and Otis Williams
- Musitron & Ondioline instrumentation by Raynoma Liles Gordy
- Other instrumentation by the Funk Brothers
  - Additional keyboards by Joe Hunter
  - Bass by James Jamerson
  - Drums by Benny Benjamin
  - Guitar by Eddie Willis and Joe Messina

== Chart history ==
Chart (1962)	Peak position
U.S. Billboard R&B Singles	22
