= Meet the Temptations =

Studio album by the Temptations
- Released: April 13, 1964
- Recorded: October 1961 – January 1964
- Genre: Soul; doo-wop
- Length: 31:33
- Label: Gordy
- Producer: Berry Gordy, Andre Williams, William "Mickey" Stevenson, Smokey Robinson, and Norman Whitfield

The Temptations chronology
Meet the Temptations (1964)	The Temptations Sing Smokey (1965)

Singles from Meet the Temptations
- 1. "Check Yourself" Released: November 7, 1961; 2. "Dream Come True" Released: March 16, 1962; 3. "Paradise" Released: September 26, 1962; 4. "I Want a Love I Can See" Released: March 18, 1963; 5. "Farewell My Love" Released: June 25, 1963; 6. "The Way You Do the Things You Do" Released: January 23, 1964

Professional ratings
Review scores
Source	Rating
AllMusic	4.5/5 stars
Record Mirror	4/5 stars

Meet the Temptations is the debut studio album by the Temptations for the Gordy (Motown) label released in 1964. It includes most of the group's early singles, excluding only the first, "Oh Mother of Mine", and its b-side, "Romance Without Finance" (later included on a CD reissue of the LP); as well as the single "Mind Over Matter" (and its b-side "I'll Love You Till I Die"), in which the group is credited as The Pirates. The album consists entirely of previously released singles, including the group's first hit single, "The Way You Do the Things You Do".

The lineup on the cover features Eddie Kendricks, Melvin Franklin, Paul Williams, Otis Williams, and newest Temptation Davis (later David) Ruffin. Ruffin had just joined the act three months before this album was released, and actually only appears on "The Way You Do The Things You Do". The other tracks all feature original Temptation Elbridge "Al" Bryant, who was fired from the group in December 1963.

Again, excepting the hit single, these tracks all date from the Temptations' slow-selling starting period (during which some Motown staffers referred to them as the "hitless Temptations"). Despite local success in Detroit and the midwest, the Temptations released six singles that missed the Top 100 Pop & R&B charts, and one, "Dream Come True", which made it to #22 on the R&B singles chart. Most of these songs feature Paul Williams as (main) lead, while Kendricks, Bryant, Franklin, and Otis Williams were given plenty of lead lines, ad-libs and harmony vocals heard throughout the album. Kendricks was also given a small handful of songs to lead as well, including the two charting singles.

The album was originally issued only in monaural sound. A stereo remix of the album was issued along with the original mono version in 1966. The bonus tracks were added to the album in 1999.

== Track listing ==
Side 1
No.	Title	Writer(s)	Lead vocalist	Length
1.	"The Way You Do the Things You Do"	Smokey Robinson, Bobby Rogers	Eddie Kendricks	2:46
2.	"I Want a Love I Can See"	Robinson	Paul Williams	2:33
3.	"(You're My) Dream Come True"	Berry Gordy, Jr.	Eddie Kendricks	2:57
4.	"Paradise"	Gordy	Eddie Kendricks, Melvin Franklin	2:52
5.	"May I Have This Dance"	Janie Bradford, Norman Whitfield	Eddie Kendricks	2:13
6.	"Isn't She Pretty"	Gordy, Eddie Kendricks, Otis Williams	Eddie Kendricks, Otis Williams, Paul Williams, Melvin Franklin, Al Bryant	2:45

Side 2
No.	Title	Writer(s)	Lead vocalist	Length
7.	"Just Let Me Know"	Gordy	Paul Williams	2:56
8.	"Your Wonderful Love"	Gord	Paul Williams	2:52
9.	"The Further You Look, the Less You See"	Robinson, Whitfield	Paul Williams	2:21
10.	"Check Yourself"	Elbridge Bryant, Melvin Franklin, Gordy, Otis Williams	Paul Williams; intro: Otis Williams, Melvin Franklin	2:48
11.	"Slow Down Heart"	Robinson	Paul Williams, Melvin Franklin	2:36
12.	"Farewell My Love"	Gordy	Eddie Kendricks, Melvin Franklin, Paul Williams, Al Bryant	2:28

1999 CD reissue bonus tracks
No.	Title	Writer(s)	Lead vocalist	Length
13.	"Oh, Mother of Mine"	William "Mickey" Stevenson, Otis Williams	Eddie Kendricks, Paul Williams	2:20
14.	"Romance Without Finance"	Stevenson, Kendricks	Paul Williams	2:48

== Outtakes and other early tracks ==
Technically there wasn't a recording session for this album as it was basically a collection of the group's singles and B-sides up to that point. Other tracks that were recorded along the same timeline that could have been included on the album were:

- "My Pillow" (Robert Plaisted)
  - Produced by William "Mickey" Stevenson, led by Eddie Kendricks & Melvin Franklin
    - (Features Franklin, Otis Williams, Al Bryant, and Paul Williams singing the chorus out front in a four-part vocal harmony)
- "He Who Picks A Rose (Demo)" (Whitfield)
  - Produced by Norman Whitfield, led by Eddie Kendricks, Al Bryant & Paul Williams Sr.
- "Camouflage [Version 1]" (Gordy)
  - Produced by Berry Gordy, Jr., led by Eddie Kendricks, Melvin Franklin & Al Bryant
- "So Much Joy" (Bradford, Rebecca Nichols, Earl Brooks)
  - Produced by Earl Brooks, led by Paul Williams
- "I Couldn't Cry If I Wanted To" (Whitfield, Edward Holland, Jr.)
  - Produced by Norman Whitfield, led by Paul Williams
- "Tear Stained Letter" (Whitfield, Bradford)
  - Produced by Norman Whitfield, led by Paul Williams
- "It Don't Have To Be This Way" (Clarence Paul)
  - Produced by Clarence Paul, led by Paul Williams
- "Witchcraft (For Your Love)" (Stevenson, Robert Hamilton)
  - Produced by William "Mickey" Stevenson & Robert Hamilton, led by Paul Williams
- "(Talking 'Bout) Nobody But My Baby" (Whitfield, Holland)
  - Produced by Norman Whitfield, led by Eddie Kendricks
- "Positively Absolutely Right" (Andre Williams)
  - Produced by Andre Williams, led by Melvin Franklin, Al Bryant and Eddie Kendricks
- "A Tear From A Woman's Eyes" (Holland–Dozier–Holland)
  - Produced by Brian Holland & Lamont Dozier, led by Eddie Kendricks
- All of the above tracks have subsequently been released
- Four other tracks were released as tracks/bonus tracks on other albums

== Personnel ==
The Temptations

- Eddie Kendricks – vocals (tenor/falsetto)
- Paul Williams – vocals (second tenor)
- Melvin Franklin – vocals (bass)
- Otis Williams – vocals (baritone)
- Elbridge "Al" Bryant – vocals (tenor/falsetto) (all tracks except "The Way You Do the Things You Do")
- Davis "David" Ruffin – vocals (tenor/falsetto) ("The Way You Do the Things You Do")

with:

- Eddie Holland – backing vocals ("Check Yourself")
- Brian Holland – backing vocals ("Check Yourself")

Technical

- Berry Gordy – "Dream Come True", "Paradise", "May I Have This Dance", "Isn't She Pretty", "Just Let Me Know", "Your Wonderful Love", "Check Yourself" and "Farewell My Love", Executive Producer (Album)
- Smokey Robinson – "The Way You Do the Things You Do", "I Want a Love I Can See", "May I Have This Dance", "Just Let Me Know", "The Further You Look, the Less You See", "Slow Down Heart" and "Farewell My Love", Executive Producer (Album)
- Norman Whitfield – producer on "May I Have This Dance" and "The Further You Look, the Less You See"
- Andre Williams and William "Mickey" Stevenson (as "Dre-Mic") – producer on "Oh, Mother of Mine" and "Romance Without Finance"
- Bernard Yeszin, Wallace Mead – cover design, photography

== Singles history ==
The main lead vocalists on each track are identified by superscripts: (a) Paul Williams, (b) Eddie Kendricks, (c) Al Bryant, (d) Otis Williams, (e) Melvin Franklin.

- "Oh Mother of Mine" ^{a, b}
  - Miracle single 5 (originally a non-album single; CD bonus track), July 24, 1961; b-side: "Romance Without Finance" ^{a, b}
- "Check Yourself" ^{a, (intro: d, e)}
  - Miracle single 12, November 7, 1961; b-side: "Your Wonderful Love" ^{a}
- "(You're My) Dream Come True" ^{b}
  - Gordy single 7001, March 16, 1962; b-side: "Isn't She Pretty" (recorded 1961) ^{c, a, b, e, d}
- "Paradise" ^{b, e}
  - Gordy single 7010, September 26, 1962; b-side: "Slow Down Heart" ^{a, e}
- "Mind Over Matter (I'm Gonna Make You Mine)" ^{b} (credited as The Pirates)
  - Mel-O-Dy single 105 (non-album single), September 29, 1962; b-side: "I'll Love You Till I Die" ^{a} (The Pirates)
- "I Want A Love I Can See" ^{a}
  - Gordy single 7015, March 18, 1963; b-side: "The Further You Look, the Less You See" ^{a}
- "Farewell My Love" ^{a, b, c, e}
  - Gordy single 7020, June 25, 1963; b-side: "May I Have This Dance" (recorded 1962)* ^{b, e}
- "The Way You Do the Things You Do" ^{b}
  - Gordy single 7028, January 23, 1964; b-side: "Just Let Me Know" (recorded 1963) ^{a, c}

(*) Elbridge "Al" Bryant was originally credited as the lead on "May I Have This Dance". In fact the first tenor lead on this song was actually performed by Eddie Kendricks singing in his natural tenor, as well as his falsetto on the end. Other songs with Kendricks’ natural singing voice include "My Pillow", "Camouflage [Version 1]", and "Way Over There" (from The Temptations Sing Smokey).

== Chart history ==
Name	Chart (1962–1964)	Peak position
Meet the Temptations	U.S. Billboard Pop Albums	95
Meet the Temptations	U.S. R&B Albums	-
"(You're My) Dream Come True"	U.S. Billboard Pop Singles	-
"(You're My) Dream Come True"	U.S. Billboard R&B Singles	22
"Paradise"	U.S. Billboard Pop Singles	122
"The Way You Do the Things You Do"	U.S. Billboard Pop Singles	11
"The Way You Do the Things You Do"	U.S. Cashbox R&B Singles	1
"Just Let Me Know"	U.S. Cashbox R&B Singles	?

- Note: There was no Billboard R&B singles chart from November 1963 until January 1965. Most discographies include R&B information from Cash Box magazine to fill in the gap in the R&B chart, as is done here for the post-1963 releases.
