= For Lovers Only (The Temptations album) =

Studio album by The Temptations
- Released: September 26, 1995
- Studios: Studio Masters, Scotland Yard and Static Sound (Los Angeles, California); Blue Palm Studios (Burbank, California); Devonshire Sound Studios (North Hollywood, California); Aire L.A. Studios (Glendale, California); United Sound Systems (Detroit, Michigan)
- Genres: Funk; Soul
- Length: 54:52
- Label: Motown
- Producer: Richard Perry

The Temptations chronology
Milestone (1991)	For Lovers Only (1995)	Phoenix Rising (1998)

For Lovers Only is a 1995 covers/pop standards album by The Temptations for the Motown label, something of a sequel to their 1967 album The Temptations in a Mellow Mood. The album features the final recordings of Melvin Franklin, who fell ill during recording and died before the album's release. Franklin was replaced on the tracks he does not sing on by Parliament-Funkadelic's Ray Davis in his only album appearance with the group. The first single, "Some Enchanted Evening", reached #40 on the Urban Adult Contemporary charts.

The album was also the final Temptations album for Ali-Ollie Woodson, who would be released from the group by Otis Williams in 1996, after having suffered several bouts of throat cancer. For Lovers Only was reissued in 2002 with a bonus track, a remix of "Night & Day" as included on the soundtrack to What Women Want.

== Critical reception ==
Professional ratings
Review scores
Source	Rating
AllMusic	4/5 stars

AllMusic editor Andrew Hamilton found that For Lovers Only was "arguably the Temptations' best album since Truly for You dropped in 1984." He added: "Richard Perry outdid himself with this production, he expertly captured the essence of the Temptations, regardless of the members, in these songs."

== Track listing ==
All tracks produced by Richard Perry.

For Lovers Only track listing
No.	Title	Writer(s)	Lead singer(s)	Length
1.	"Some Enchanted Evening"	Richard Rodgers; Oscar Hammerstein II	Ali Woodson; Theo Peoples	5:28
2.	"I've Grown Accustomed to Her Face"	Alan J. Lerner; Frederick Loewe	Peoples	5:49
3.	"At Last"	Harry Warren; Mack Gordon	Woodson	4:44
4.	"Night & Day"	Cole Porter	Peoples	3:53
5.	"Time After Time"	Sammy Cahn; Jule Styne	Ron Tyson	4:59
6.	"Melvin's Interlude"	Isaias Gamboa	Melvin Franklin	1:29
7.	"Life is But a Dream"	Hy Weiss; Raoul Cita	Woodson	4:26
8.	"What a Difference a Day Makes"	Maria Grever; Stanley Adams	Tyson	6:17
9.	"I'm Glad There Is You"	Jimmy Dorsey; Paul Madeira Mertz	Woodson	5:17
10.	"South Shell Interlude"	Gamboa		2:41
11.	"That's Why (I Love You So)"	Berry Gordy; Billy Davis; Gwen Gordy Fuqua	Peoples; Tyson; Woodson	4:42
12.	"For Your Love"/"You Send Me"	Ed Townsend; Sam Cooke	Otis Williams; Woodson	5:07

2002 bonus track
No.	Title	Writer(s)	Lead singer(s)	Length
13.	"Night & Day" (Remix)	Porter	Peoples	3:53

== Personnel ==
The Temptations

- Ali-Ollie Woodson – vocals (tenor/baritone)
- Theo Peoples – vocals (second tenor/baritone)
- Otis Williams – vocals (second tenor/baritone)
- Ron Tyson – vocals (first tenor/falsetto)
- Melvin Franklin – vocals (bass) (only on "Melvin's Interlude" and "Life Is But A Dream")
- Ray Davis – vocals (bass) (all except "Melvin's Interlude" and "Life Is But A Dream")

Musicians

- Jimmy Varner – keyboards (1, 5), synthesizers (1, 5), drum programming (1, 7, 8, 12), additional synthesizers (3), synthesizer programming (7, 8), bass (7), acoustic piano (8), additional synthesizer programming (9), additional drum programming (9), additional percussion programming (9), additional keyboards (11), keyboard programming (12)
- Stephen "Static" Garrett – additional synthesizers (1, 3), effects (1), drum programming (1), additional synthesizer programming (2, 9), additional drum programming (3, 9), additional percussion programming (9)
- Ophir Shur – additional synthesizers (1), effects (1), additional synthesizer programming (2)
- Isaias Gamboa – keyboards (2–5, 11), synthesizers (2–5, 11), drum programming (2, 3, 5–11), arrangements (2–5, 7, 8, 11, 12), Detroit Strings arrangements (4), keyboard programming (6, 9, 10), additional keyboards (8), synthesizer programming (9)
- Steve Harvey – additional synthesizer programming (2), live drums (5), percussion (5), additional keyboards (11)
- Paul Jackson Jr. – guitars (1, 2, 9, 11)
- James Macon – guitars (3, 5)
- Jerry Friedman – guitars (7, 12)
- Abraham Laboriel – bass (1, 2, 9)
- Andy Simpkins – bass (4)
- Doug Grigsby – bass (12)
- Tony Alvarez – additional drum programming (3), drum programming (7)
- Paulinho da Costa – live percussion (1–3, 7–9, 11)
- Trevor Lawrence Jr. – cymbals (1, 8), bell tree (1, 8), hi-hat (8), cymbal rolls (9)
- Milt Jackson – vibraphone (4)
- Stevie Wonder – harmonica solo (7)
- Johnny Britt – trumpet solo (8), flugelhorn solo (9)
- Richard Perry – arrangements (1, 11)
- Paul Riser – Detroit Strings arrangements and conductor (1, 2, 4, 7–9, 12)
- The Temptations – all vocal arrangements

== Production ==
- Bill Dern – executive producer, additional production (8)
- Guy Abrahams – A&R direction
- Richard Perry – producer, mixing (7)
- Isaias Gamboa – associate producer
- Jimmy Varner – additional production (8)
- Alejandro Rodriguez – recording engineer
- Bob Tucker – recording engineer, mixing (7, 11, 12)
- Tony Alvarez – second engineer
- Carl Anderson – second engineer
- Stephen "Static" Garrett – second engineer
- Mark Hermann – second engineer
- Rob Chiarelli – mixing (1, 2, 9)
- Craig Burbidge – mixing (3–5, 8)
- Tom Anderson – mixing (11)
- Tony Rambo – second mix engineer (1, 2, 7, 9, 12)
- Devin Foutz – second mix engineer (3–5, 8)
- Brian Gardner – mastering at Bernie Grundman Mastering (Hollywood, California)
- Ben McCarthy – production assistant
- Derek A. McKinney – A&R production coordinator
- Jackie Salway – art direction, design
- Aaron Rapoport – photography
- Shelley Berger – management

Styling credits

- Cathie Arquilla – stylist
- Barry White – grooming
- Bosa, Jhane Barnes, JOOP! and Matthew Batanian – clothing
- Rod Keenan – hats
- Dr. Martin – sandals

== Charts ==
Chart performance for For Lovers Only
Chart (1995)	Peak position
US Top R&B/Hip-Hop Albums (Billboard)	43
