= Terron Brooks =

American singer, songwriter, and actor

- Born: Terron Brooks; October 13, 1974 (age 51); Long Beach, California, US
- Genres: pop, inspirational, R&B, soul
- Years active: 1980–present
- Label: GoDigital Records

Terron Brooks is an American singer, songwriter, and actor. He is best known for his portrayal of R&B/pop singer Eddie Kendricks in the 1998 NBC miniseries The Temptations.

== Biography ==
Born on October 13, 1974, and raised in Southern California, Brooks has been singing since the age of six.

He has sung with many artists including Stephanie Mills, Smokey Robinson, Phil Collins and Michael Jackson, and has performed in the US and Europe. He was a member of the doo-wop group The Alley Cats. He is also a Broadway actor who has been seen as "Simba" in Disney's The Lion King and "Seaweed" in Hairspray. Terron has been featured on numerous film and TV soundtrack albums including Tears of the Sun, the Adventures of Brer Rabbit and ABC's Geppetto.

In 1998 he portrayed Eddie Kendricks in The Temptations miniseries. At the time of production, Brooks was 23 years old and had no film experience. In 2006, Brooks signed a deal with GoDigital Records, a subsidiary of the GoDigital Media Group for exclusive worldwide digital distribution. In mid-2006, Brooks had an interview on KABC radio station and his single "Down" from his first album, Prelude, was played for the first time.

In June 2010 Brooks sang back-up during Phil Collins' tour promoting his Going Back album. In 2022, he released The Soul of Broadway.

In August 2025 it was announced that Terron Brooks will be performing as a guest artist with the Springfield Symphony Orchestra in a concert scheduled for 17 January 2026.

== Discography ==
Studio Albums

- 2006: Prelude
- 2007: Overture
- 2008: Love at Christmas
- 2012: Contagious
- 2025: Open

Live Albums

- 2007: Alive
