= Oh Mother of Mine =

"Oh, Mother of Mine"

Single by The Temptations

from the album Meet The Temptations
- B-side: "Romance Without Finance"
- Released: July 24, 1961
- Recorded: Hitsville USA; May 1961
- Genre: Soul, R&B, doo-wop
- Length: 2:20
- Label: Miracle (M 5)
- Songwriters: William "Mickey" Stevenson; Otis Williams
- Producers: William "Mickey" Stevenson; Andre Williams (as "Dre-Mic")

The Temptations singles chronology
"Oh, Mother of Mine" (1961)	"Check Yourself" (1961)

"Oh, Mother of Mine" is a 1961 song that was released as a Miracle label single by Motown singing group The Temptations. It was the group's debut single for Motown, after signing with them in May of that year.

== Credits ==
- Lead vocals by Paul Williams (song) and Eddie Kendricks (bridge)
- Background vocals by Eddie Kendricks, Melvin Franklin, Al Bryant and Otis Williams
- Instrumentation by The Funk Brothers
