= Paradise (The Temptations song) =

Single by The Temptations

from the album Meet The Temptations
- B-side: "Slow Down Heart"
- Released: September 26, 1962
- Recorded: Hitsville USA (Studio A); August 30, 1962
- Genre: R&B
- Length: 2:49
- Label: Gordy; G 7010
- Songwriter(s): Berry Gordy Jr.
- Producer(s): Berry Gordy Jr.

The Temptations singles chronology
"Dream Come True" (1962)	"Paradise" / "Slow Down Heart" (1962)	"I Want a Love I Can See" (1963)

"Paradise" is a 1962 single by The Temptations for the Gordy label. The single is notable for being The Temptations' first charting single on the Billboard Pop charts. However, it was not their first on the Hot 100 (that honor would go to the group’s later single, "The Way You Do the Things You Do"), instead it charted at 22 on the Billboard Bubbling Under Hot 100 charts.

== Overview ==
Temptations' falsetto Eddie Kendricks sings the main lead vocal on the song, the group's bass singer, Melvin Franklin, also has a few lead parts on the intro, the bridge and on the outro. Kendricks narrates how he hopes his former love would come back to him as it would be as if he was in paradise if she does. This single was the follow-up to "Dream Come True", in which Kendricks was also the main lead and was the first one to ever chart for the group (on the R&B charts).

Though this was the group's first appearance on the Pop charts, due to its low placing on the chart (and failing to chart on the Hot R&B Sides chart) the next single "I Want a Love I Can See" would be led by group baritone–main lead singer Paul Williams, and would be the first produced by Smokey Robinson. It however was a regional smash hit in many areas of the country, especially around California.

== Personnel ==
- Lead vocals by Eddie Kendricks and Melvin Franklin
- Background vocals by Al Bryant, Melvin Franklin, Paul Williams, and Otis Williams
- Instrumentation by The Funk Brothers

== Chart history ==
Chart (1962)	Peak position
U.S. Billboard Bubbling Under the Hot 100	122
