= Gina Ravera =

American actress

- Born: San Francisco, California, U.S.
- Occupation: Actress
- Years active: 1990–present

Gina Ravera is an American actress. She has appeared in the films Showgirls (1995), Soul Food (1997), Kiss the Girls (1997), The Temptations and The Great Debaters (2007). She co-starred as detective Irene Daniels in the TNT crime drama series The Closer (2005–2009).

== Life and career ==
Ravera was born in San Francisco, California. She is of mixed African-American and Puerto Rican heritage. She is a classically trained dancer.

In the early 1990s, Ravera began appearing in guest-starring roles on television shows, including The Fresh Prince of Bel-Air, Melrose Place and Star Trek: The Next Generation. During 1993–1994, she was a cast member of the CBS crime series Silk Stalkings. In films, she had a starring role in the 1995 erotic drama Showgirls, directed by Paul Verhoeven, and in 1997 appeared in the family drama Soul Food. Ravera later went to television, appearing in TV films of the week and in series guest roles and regular roles. She appeared in the TV miniseries The Temptations in 1998 as Josephine Williams, the first wife of Otis Williams. She was a regular cast member of Time of Your Life, a spin-off series of Fox's popular teen drama Party of Five, from 1999 to 2000.

From 2005 to 2009, Ravera played Irene Daniels during the first four seasons of the TNT crime drama series The Closer and was the only regular cast member to leave the series during its run. From 2006 to 2008, she appeared in a recurring role on ER and in 2007 she appeared opposite Denzel Washington as the wife of Melvin B. Tolson in the biographical film The Great Debaters.

== Filmography ==
=== Film and TV movies ===
Year	Title	Role	Notes
1990	Lambada	Funk Queen	
1991	Auto Theft: Hot Cars, Cold Facts	Lisa	Short
1992	Steal America	Jeena	
1994	White Mile	Alma	TV movie
1995	Illegal in Blue	Alexis	Video
1995	Showgirls	Molly Abrams	
1995	W.E.I.R.D. World	Dr. Patty Provost	TV movie
1995	919 Fifth Avenue	Sheila	TV movie
1996	Soul of the Game	Grace	TV movie
1996	Get on the Bus	Gina	
1997	Soul Food	Faith Hunter	
1997	Kiss the Girls	Naomi Cross	
1999	A Luv Tale	Taylor James	
2000	Rhapsody	Lenore Foxwood	TV movie
2002	Saint Sinner	Rachel Dressler	TV movie
2003	Chasing Papi	Beauty Pageant Judge	
2004	Pryor Offenses	Tameka	TV movie
2004	Gas	Rev. Sheila	
2007	The Great Debaters	Ruth Tolson	

=== Television ===
Year	Title	Role	Notes
1990	The Fresh Prince of Bel-Air	Cheryl	Episode: "Someday Your Prince Will Be in Effect: Part 2,” credited as Gina Ravarra
1991	In Living Color	Herself	Episode: "Episode #2.24"
1991	True Colors	Anita	Episode: "Yo' House, Mama: Part 2"
1991	Reasonable Doubts	Latasha Richardson	Episode: "Pure Gold"
1992	Melrose Place	Theresa	Episode: "Second Chances"
1993	Where I Live	Robin	Episode: "Dontay's Inferno"
1993	Days of Our Lives	Vanessa Mitchell	Episode: "Episode #1.7060"
1993	Frasier	Waitress	Episode: "The Good Son"
1993	Star Trek: The Next Generation	Ensign Tyler	Episode: "Phantasms"
1993-94	Silk Stalkings	Dr. Diana Roth	Recurring cast
1994	NYPD Blue	Shawanda Wilson	Episode: "For Whom the Skell Tolls"
1997	In the House	Sam	Episode: "Men in the Black"
1998	The Temptations	Josephine	Episode: "Episode #1.1 & #1.2"
1998	Malcolm & Eddie	Tracy Burke	Episode: "Dream Girl"
1999–2000	Time of Your Life	Jocelyn House	Main cast
2000–01	The Fugitive	Sara Gerard	Recurring cast
2003	Miracles	Raina Bauer	Episode: "The Patient"
2003	Charmed	Mary	Episode: "My Three Witches"
2004	The Handler	Agent Ridgeway	Episode: "Acts of Congress"
2004	Boston Legal	Dr. Amanda Gerard	Episode: "A Greater Good"
2005	Inconceivable	Tricia Santos	Episode: "The Last Straw"
2005	Everwood	Stacey	Episode: "Pro Choice"
2005–09	The Closer	Det. Irene Daniels	Recurring cast: seasons 1-2, main cast: seasons 3-4
2006–08	ER	Dr. Bettina DeJesus	Recurring cast: Season 13-14, guest: Season 15
2007	Raines	Lisa Lincoln	Episode: "Stone Dead"
2009	Private Practice	Dawn	Episode: "The Hard Part"
2011	Lie to Me	Paula	Episode: "Rebound"
2012	CSI: Crime Scene Investigation	Dr. Paula O'Keefe	Episode: "Risky Business Class"
2014	Castle	Marsha Stoller	Episode: "Montreal"
2018	Arrow	Lydia Cassamento	Recurring cast: season 6
2020	Station 19	Claudia Flores	Episode: "Satellite of Love" & "Born to Run"
2021	Calls	Room Service (voice)	Episode: "Pedro Across the Street"

== Awards and nominations ==
Year	Awards	Category	Recipient	Outcome
1999	ALMA Awards	ALMA Award for Outstanding Individual Performance in a Made-for-Television Movie or Mini-Series	The Temptations	Nominated
2006	Imagen Awards	Imagen Award for Best Supporting Actress - Television	The Closer	Nominated
2008	Screen Actors Guild Award	Screen Actors Guild Award for Outstanding Performance by an Ensemble in a Drama Series	The Closer	Nominated
2009	Screen Actors Guild Award	Screen Actors Guild Award for Outstanding Performance by an Ensemble in a Drama Series	The Closer	Nominated
2009	Imagen Awards	Imagen Award for Best Supporting Actress - Television	The Closer	Nominated

== See also ==
- List of Afro-Latinos
