= Charles Malik Whitfield =

American actor

- Born: August 1, 1972 (age 54); The Bronx, New York, U.S.
- Occupation: Actor
- Years active: 1992–present

Charles Malik Whitfield (born August 1, 1972) is an American actor. He is known for his performance as Otis Williams in the television miniseries The Temptations (1998), for which he was nominated for an NAACP Image Award for Outstanding Actor in a Television Movie or Mini-Series. Whitfield later starred in the television series The Guardian and If Loving You Is Wrong and also had the recurring roles in Supernatural, American Horror Story, Empire and Chicago Med.

== Life and career ==
Whitfield was born in the Bronx, New York. Beginning his career in 1992, he played, from 1993 to 1994, Ben Price on the ABC daytime soap opera, One Life to Live. He later appeared in films Fresh and Bleeding Hearts. Whitfield is best known for his role as Otis Williams in the 1998 miniseries The Temptations.

From 2001 to 2003 he starred as James Mooney in the CBS legal drama series, The Guardian. Whitfield later guest-starred on CSI: Miami, Castle, The Game, Private Practice, White Collar, Rizzoli & Isles, Body of Proof, Law & Order: Special Victims Unit, The Good Wife, and Scorpion. He also had the recurring role of Agent Henriksen in The CW series Supernatural from 2007 to 2008, and co-starred in the number of television pilots. Whitfield also featured in Ubisoft's first-person shooter, Far Cry 3 as Dennis who helps Jason Brody throughout the game.

In 2014, Whitfield began starring as April Parker Jones' character's love interest in the Oprah Winfrey Network series If Loving You Is Wrong. The series ended in 2019. In 2016 he appeared in 3 episodes of the sixth season of the anthological series American Horror Story, portraying Mason Harris.

In 2019, Whitfield starred on Bounce TV original sitcom Last Call in the lead role as Darius Knight. In 2022 he starred in the second season of Allblk horror anthology series, Terror Lake Drive.

== Filmography ==
=== Film ===
Year	Title	Role	Notes
1994	Fresh	Smokey	
1994	Bleeding Hearts	Donny Stewart	
2000	The Playaz Court	Juwane	
2001	Our Journey	-	Short
2001	Prison Song	Officer Welles	
2001	Behind Enemy Lines	Marine Captain Glen Rodway	
2002	Kali's Vibe	-	
2002	High Times' Potluck	Malik	
2002	Second String	Lenny Voyles	TV movie
2004	Doing Hard Time	Armand	Video
2005	Betrayed	Lieutenant Eddie Fulton	Video
2007	Grindin'	Malik X	
2008	A Line in the Sand	Owen	
2008	15 Minutes of Fame	Nodoubt	
2009	Notorious	Wayne Barrow	
2009	Blue	Courtney Brown	
2009	Truly Blessed	Joseph	
2009	A Day in the Life	Father Freedman	
2009	Carla	Danny Williamson	Short
2010	Krews	Rebob	
2010	Gun	Dante	
2011	The Sculptor	Leo	Short
2011	Interception	Peter	Short
2012	The Silent Treatment	Samuel	Short
2014	Steps of Faith	Marshall Lee	
2015	Forgiveness	Detective Stewart	
2016	She's Got a Plan	Allen Dash	
2016	A Heart That Forgives	Silk	
2017	The Hills	Seargeant Manson	
2018	Couples' Night	Kev	
2018	We Belong Together	Thomas	
2018	Compton's Finest	Kevin Blackman	
2018	The Counter: 1960	Keith	Short
2019	Three's Complicated	Craig	TV movie
2019	The One You Never Forget	Dad	Short
2019	Love Dot Com: The Social Experiment	Paul Quinn	
2020	Daddy's Home	-	Short
2020	Blue: The American Dream	Courtney Brown	
2022	The Stepmother	Harrison	
2022	Unfavorable Odds	Kenny	
2023	The Stepmother 3	Harrison	
2023	Picture Me Dead	Vernon Wilkens	
2023	Still Here	William Law	
2023	The Bastard Sons	Darius	
2024	Night Games	The Cleaner	
2024	The Assistant 2	-	

=== Television ===
Year	Title	Role	Notes
1992	Law & Order	Babatunde's Roommate	Episode: "Consultation"
1993	Law & Order	Smith	Episode: "Apocrypha"
1993–94	One Life to Live	Ben Price	Regular role
1996	New York Undercover	Judd Dawes	Episode: "Without Mercy"
1997	Touched by an Angel	Eric Zachariah 'E.Z.' Mony	Episode: "Nothing But Net"
1998	LateLine	Connie Davis	Episode: "The Negotiator"
1998	Law & Order	Calvin Berry	Episode: "Monster"
1998	The Temptations	Otis Williams	Episode: "Episode #1.1 & #1.2"
1999	Homicide: Life on the Street	Walter Boyce	Episode: "Sideshow"
1999	Seven Days	Dellard Shivers	Episode: "Vegas Heist"
2000	Now and Again	Maceo T. Jones	Episode: "I am the Greatest"
2000	The Street	Knowles	Episode: "The Ultimatum"
2001–03	The Guardian	James Mooney	Main role (seasons 1–2)
2002	Soul Food	Jerome	Episode: "Out with the Old..."
2002	For Your Love	Rob	Episode: "The Blast from the Past"
2003	The District	Robert Hopkins	Episode: "A House Divided"
2006	Love, Inc.	Larry	Episode: "Hello, Larry" & "Major Dad"
2006	All of Us	-	Episode: "Love Do Cost a Thing"
2007	Close to Home	Benny Boudreaux	Episode: "Eminent Domain"
2007	Life	Peter Stylman	Episode: "Let Her Go"
2007	CSI: Miami	Andre Harding Charles	Episode: "Stand Your Ground"
2007–08	Supernatural	Agent Victor Henriksen	Recurring role (season 2); guest (seasons 3–4)
2008	Raising the Bar	Calvin Hines	Episode: "Pilot"
2008	Lincoln Heights	Billy Clemmons	Episode: "The Day Before Tomorrow"
2009	Castle	Charles Wyler	Episode: "A Chill Goes Through Her Veins"
2009	The Game	Ronald "Ronnie" Dawson	Episode: "I Want It All and I Want It Now"
2009	Private Practice	Ty	Episode: "Pushing the Limits"
2009	Ghost Whisperer	Officer Douglas Ramsey	Episode: "Excessive Forces"
2010	White Collar	Ryan Wilkes	Episode: "Front Man"
2010	Rizzoli & Isles	Father Osorio Coku/Reginald Perry	Episode: "Sympathy for the Devil"
2011	Southland	Detective Manheim	Episode: "Code 4" & "Failure Drill"
2011	The Mentalist	Cole Ruger	Episode: "Redacted"
2011	Law & Order: LA	Al Hayes	Episode: "El Sereno"
2011	Warehouse 13	Raymond	Episode: "The Greatest Gift"
2011	Body of Proof	Dave Stackhouse	Episode: "Your Number's Up"
2011	Reed Between the Lines	Marcus	Episode: "Let's Talk About Two Dates for the Dance"
2012	CSI: NY	Clyde Duvall	Episode: "Unwrapped"
2012	Malibu Country	Doug	Episode: "Merry Malibu Christmas"
2013	Two and a Half Men	Police Officer	Episode: "Advantage: Fat, Flying Baby"
2013	Law & Order: Special Victims Unit	Brass	Episode: "Funny Valentine"
2013	Golden Boy	Darrell Reed	Episode: "Longshot"
2013	Sleepy Hollow	Parsons	Episode: "John Doe"
2013	CSI: Crime Scene Investigation	Ray	Episode: "Last Supper"
2014	The Good Wife	Rebel Kane	Episode: "Goliath and David"
2014	I Didn't Do It	Coach Laketta	Episode: "Lindy Nose Best"
2014	Franklin & Bash	Beckman's Lawyer	Episode: "Kershaw v. Lincecum"
2014	Scorpion	Dan Heather	Episode: "Dominoes"
2014–20	If Loving You Is Wrong	Lushion Morgan	Main role
2015–16	The Night Shift	Mr. Martin	Guest (seasons 2–3)
2015–18	Empire	Reverend L.C. Price	Recurring role (season 2 & 4)
2016	American Horror Story: Roanoke	Noah Davies	Recurring role
2017	Lifeline	-	Episode: "In 33 Days You'll Die"
2017	Tales	Blue	Episode: "99 Problems"
2017	Blue Bloods	Deputy Chief Devin Jones	Episode: "Pick Your Poison"
2017–21	Bronzeville	Willie	Recurring role
2018	Family Time	Maxwell	Episode: "Mancrush"
2019	Last Call	Darius Knight	Main role
2019	Chambers	Russell Perkins	Recurring role
2019–24	Chicago Med	Ben Campbell	Recurring role (seasons 5–6, 8); guest (seasons 7, 9)
2021	NCIS: Los Angeles	Gary DeMayo	Episode: "Sundown"
2022	The Cleaning Lady	Theo	Episode: "TNT"
2022	Terror Lake Drive	Mayor Delroy Brown	Recurring role (season 2)
2022	Atlanta	Bunk	Episode: "Born 2 Die"
2024–25	Beauty in Black	Jules	Main role

=== Video game ===
Year	Title	Role
2012	Far Cry 3	Dennis Rodgers (voice)

== Awards and nominations ==
Year	Awards	Category	Recipient	Outcome
1999	NAACP Image Awards	NAACP Image Award for Outstanding Actor in a Television Movie, Mini-Series or Dramatic Special	"The Temptations"	Nominated
