= Check Yourself =

Single by The Temptations

from the album Meet The Temptations
- B-side: "Your Wonderful Love"
- Released: November 7, 1961
- Recorded: Hitsville USA; October 28, 1961
- Genre: Soul, R&B, Doo-wop
- Length: 2:45
- Label: Miracle; M 12
- Songwriter(s): Berry Gordy, Jr. Elbridge Bryant; David English; Otis Williams
- Producer(s): Berry Gordy, Jr.

The Temptations singles chronology
"Oh Mother of Mine" (1961)	"Check Yourself" (1961)	"Dream Come True" (1962)

"Check Yourself" is a 1961 song that was released as a Miracle label single by Motown singing group The Temptations; and written by Motown president Berry Gordy, and group members Otis Williams, Melvin Franklin and Elbridge Bryant, and produced by Gordy. It was the group's second single, as well as their second and last single for the Miracle label, which was deactivated immediately after this release. Starting with the next single release, the group's future recordings for Motown would be issued under the Gordy label until it was deactivated in 1988.

== Recording ==
This is one of the small handful of pre-psychedelic era songs the group recorded that had more than two members singing lead at one point (the second one recorded but the first released). Tenor Otis Williams leads the intro of the song, while the group's bass singer, Melvin Franklin, has a spoken interlude. Baritone Paul Williams, at the time the group's lead singer, leads the rest of the song as the song's narrator; the narrator talks about how after "breaking hearts" the tables have now turned on him as he’s losing his love and now "memories... are all I have".

According to some sources, including Otis Williams autobiography falsetto Eddie Kendricks and Elbridge "Al" Bryant did not record vocal on this single, and that the high notes of the song were done by Brian Holland and/or Eddie Holland. However, this cannot be substantiated by official Motown studio records. As for the label's deactivation, it was said to be due to poor sales (not helped by the slogan "If it’s a hit, it’s a Miracle") and confusion with The Miracles singing group.

== Reception ==
The single was a regional hit around the Detroit area, receiving a lot of airplay on local stations, but it would never chart nationally. The group's next single, "Dream Come True", would be led by Kendricks, and would be their first to chart nationally. When that happened their new label would give Kendricks the lead on the group's A-sides, and regulate Paul Williams to B-sides, until 1963. About two years after this single was released, "The Duke of Earl" Gene Chandler would cover the song on one of his singles.

== Personnel ==
- Lead vocals by Paul Williams (song), Otis Williams (intro) and Melvin Franklin (intro-spoken interlude)
- Background vocals by Eddie Kendricks, Melvin Franklin, Al Bryant, Otis Williams, Brian Holland and Eddie Holland
- Instrumentation by The Funk Brothers
