= Hello, Young Lovers (song) =

1951 song

Song
- Published: 1951
- Songwriter: Oscar Hammerstein II
- Composer: Richard Rodgers

"Hello, Young Lovers" is a show tune from the 1951 Rodgers and Hammerstein musical, The King and I. It is sung by Anna, played by Gertrude Lawrence in the original Broadway production; by Valerie Hobson in the original London West End production; and by Deborah Kerr in the film version (although voiced-over by Marni Nixon).

The heroine Anna sings this song when she tells the wives of the King of Siam about her late husband, and sympathises with the plight of Tuptim, the Burmese slave girl and newest wife of the king.

== Cover versions ==
Among popular versions are those by:

- Frank Sinatra – recorded March 2, 1951 with Axel Stordahl and His Orchestra, as well as on 1965's September of My Years.
- Perry Como – recorded March 20, 1951 with Mitchell Ayres and His Orchestra. This charted briefly in the United States, reaching No. 27 in the Billboard charts.
- Bing Crosby – recorded April 9, 1951 with Victor Young and His Orchestra.
- Guy Lombardo (with vocal by Kenny Martin) (1951).
- Andy Williams included his version of it on the 1959 album Andy Williams Sings Rodgers and Hammerstein.
- Paul Anka had a significant revival in 1960, in the swinging Bobby Darin style on his album Paul Anka – Swings for Young Lovers. (#5 Canada)
- Hank Mobley included an instrumental jazz version on his in 1961 recorded album Another Workout.
- Nancy Wilson recorded it as the title track of her 1962 album with string arrangements by George Shearing.
- Lesley Gore had a live version in 1965 on The Ed Sullivan Show while promoting her single "Look of Love".
- The Temptations recorded it for their 1967 album The Temptations in a Mellow Mood.
- Stevie Wonder recorded it in 1969 for the album My Cherie Amour
- Ella Fitzgerald – included in the 'live' album Ella in Budapest (1970).
- Justin Hayward featuring Julie Ragins, Karmen Gould and Mike Dawes (2026)
