= Tony A. Da Wizard =

DJ, producer, and director (b. 1968)

TONY A. DA WIZARD
- Born: Antonio Alvarez; 1968 (age 57–58); Torrance, California
- Other names: TT Wizard, Tony A., Tony A. The Wizard, DJ Tony A., DJ Tony A. The Wizard, DJ Tony A. Da Wizard, Tony Vision
- Occupations: DJ, Record Producer, Film Director
- Known for: The Roadium Mixtapes, Hi-C Featuring Tony A., Lawless, The Roadium Mixtape Documixery
- Website: documixery.com

Tony Alvarez, known as DJ Tony A. Da Wizard (also known TT Wizard snf DJ Tony A.) is an American DJ, music producer and film director.

He is best known for creating The Roadium Mixtapes with Dr. Dre and Steve Yano at the Roadium Swap Meet in Gardena, California. He also produced and DJed for the rapper Hi-C featuring Tony A. on the album titled Skanless.

== Biography and Early Beginnings ==
Tony A. was born in Torrance, California. At the age of 11, in 1979, Tony first saw what a DJ was when he went with his brother to Noah's Ark in Long Beach. Shortly after he began working for Steve and Susan Yano at the Vermont Swap Meet in Gardena, California selling vinyl records and cassettes. He first started DJing at his Junior High School noon dances and then went on to DJ house parties, birthday parties and quinceañera's.

In 1987, Tony A. was featured on his first vinyl record single titled "You Better Think" by rapper Dazzie Dee, produced by Sir Jinx on Thin-Lyne Records, the record label of the World-famous VIP in Long Beach, California.

== Roadium (Early 1980s) ==
In the early 1980s, Steve Yano employed Dr. Dre of the World Class Wreckin' Cru to create mixtapes for him to sell at his booth at the Roadium Swap Meet. Yano was himself a mixtapes creator and a musician who inspired Tony A. to create mixtapes. In 1987, while Dr. Dre was producing various artists on Ruthless Records, he asked Tony A. if he wanted to take over doing the mixtapes for Yano. His first mixtape released was titled "Breakdown". In 1991, Tony A. released his final mixtape titled "Bullshit," which featured Hi-C, DJ Quik, 2nd II None and AMG. In total, he created more than 30 mixtapes.

== Hi-C Featuring Tony A. (Late 1980s - Early 1990s) ==
In 1989, Tony A. created and produced his first song titled "I'm Not Your Puppet" on the mixtape titled Hi-C which featured the Compton, California rapper Hi-C, who worked at the Roadium Swap Meet. After the success of the Hi-C mixtape, Tony A. created and produced "Sitting In The Park" on the mixtape titled Skanlist, which also featured Hi-C. These mixtapes led Hollywood Records in 1990 to approach Steve Yano with interest in signing the duo. After they signed, Steve Yano established his own label called "Skanless Records". They began recording their debut album titled Hi-C Featuring Tony A. at Audio Achievements in Torrance, California. There they recorded half of their album and eventually finished at Skanless Studios in Alhambra, California. This album was released December 10, 1991, peaking at 152 on the Billboard 200, 53 on the Top R&B/Hip Hop Albums, and 3 on the Heatseekers Albums for 24 weeks. The song "Sitting In The Park" reached number 21 on the Hot Rap Songs. In 1993, Tony A. (credited as Tony Alvarez) produced half of the Hi-C album titled Swing'n.

== The Roadium Mixtape Documixery (2017–2019) ==
In May 2017, Tony A. directed the Roadium Mixtape Documixery. It was a docu-series shedding light on a collection of mixtapes created by Dr Dre of the World Class Wreckin' Cru, then Tony A. started creating 4 track mixtapes, which became very popular in the LA. The aim of the series was to show a history of hip hop development and spread in the 1990s in Los Angeles. The docu-series also was a tribute to Steve Yano, a musician and mixtape creator, who died in 2014.

The documixery was a collaboration with John Elkins (JE Visual Studios), Daniel "DG" Jones (DG Media Clips), Carey Fujita (South Bay Drones), Roger "Lyve" Mera (RL Productions), Boomer Didit (The Remedy Yard) and Wiz1 (Blak Forest). The cast also included Tony A. himself, Warren G, Mister Cartoon, Violet Brown, 2nd II None, AMG, Hi-C, DJ Speed (N.W.A). American hip hop producer Sir Jinx, and football star Kelvin Anderson (VIP Records) also took part.

Production of The Roadium Mixtape Documixery was started in 2017 and was completed in December 2018. The series was set to release in 2019 but was allegedly postponed to 2020. The trailer was released in 2020 on Youtube The director's cut version is available on Youtube.

== Present day ==
As of 2019, Tony A. is focused on directing films (Tony Vision) while DJing and producing music. He established Tony Vision (a Youtube Channel) and since then he has been a Youtube podcast host at Roadium Radio.

New Roadium Radio Episodes stream twice a week, on Wednesdays and Sundays at 7pm, PST.

== Charts ==
US charts for the Hip-Hop and R&B mixtapes created by Tony A. in 1992
Chart (1992)	Peak position
US Billboard 200	152
US Top R&B/Hip-Hop Albums (Billboard)	53
US Heatseekers Albums (Billboard)	3
