= Johnnie Mae Matthews =

American singer

- Born: December 31, 1922; Bessemer, Alabama, U.S.
- Died: January 6, 2002 (aged 79) Detroit, Michigan
- Genres: R&B, soul, Blues
- Occupations: Singer, songwriter, record producer
- Instruments: Vocals, piano
- Years active: 1958–2000
- Labels: Northern Recording Co., Reel, Big Hit, Mercury Records

Johnnie Mae Matthews (December 31, 1922 – January 6, 2002) was an American blues and R&B singer, songwriter, and record producer from Bessemer, Alabama. Known as the "Godmother of Detroit Soul" and as the first African American female to own and operate her own record label (Northern Recording Company) she was an early influence on the careers of many of the now-famous recording stars who began their careers in Detroit, including Otis Williams, David Ruffin, and Richard Street (all of The Temptations), Jimmy Ruffin, Richard "Popcorn" Wylie, Norman Whitfield, Berry Gordy, founder of Motown Records, Timmy Shaw, Barbara Lewis, and Bettye LaVette.

== Career ==
In 1963, Matthews hired manager Ollie McLaughlin, who had previously launched the career of Barbara Lewis. McLaughlin brought Matthews to the attention of Mercury Records’ new Blue Rock subsidiary, where he eventually produced both of her singles for that label, "Baby, What's Wrong", and "My Man (The Sweetest Man in the World)". He also produced her lone Spokane label effort, "Worried About You". During the late 1960s Matthews also cut a series of singles for her Big Hit label, including "I Have No Choice", "My Momma Didn't Lie", and "Don't Be Discouraged".

=== 1970s ===
Black Nasty was later renamed the ADC Band, and the group resurfaced in 1978 with the R&B smash "Long Stroke" written by Michael Moneystone Judkins who greatly influenced the success of the ADC Band with help in writing from Audrey Matthews. Encouraged by their success, Matthews revived Northern Recording Company around this time, with the ADC Band supplying the musical backing on the disco-inspired tune "It's Good", which was later re-issued on the Cotillion label for national distribution. After one final Northern effort, 1980's "I Can Feel It," she closed the label for good, effectively ending her recording career.

== Death ==
Matthews died after a long battle with cancer on January 6, 2002, at the age of 79.
