= Paul Williams (The Temptations singer) =

American singer (1939–1973)

Paul Williams, Sr.
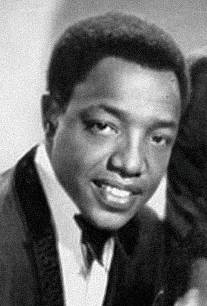
- Williams in 1964

Background information
- Born: July 2, 1939; Ensley, Alabama, U.S.
- Origin: Birmingham, Alabama, U.S.
- Died: August 17, 1973 (aged 34) Detroit, Michigan, U.S.
- Genres: R&B; soul
- Occupations: Singer; choreographer
- Years active: 1955–1973
- Label: Motown
- Formerly of: The Primes; The Temptations

Paul Williams, Sr. (July 2, 1939 – August 17, 1973) was an American baritone singer. He was noted for being one of the founding members and the original lead singer of the Motown group the Temptations. Personal problems and failing health forced Williams to retire in 1971 and, aged 34, he was found dead two years later as the result of an apparent suicide.

== Early years ==
Williams was born on July 2, 1939, and raised in the Ensley neighborhood of Birmingham, Alabama. He was the son of Sophia and Rufus Williams, a gospel singer in a gospel music vocal group called the Ensley Jubilee Singers. He met Eddie Kendricks in elementary school; supposedly, the two first encountered each other in a fistfight after Williams dumped a bucket of dirty mop water on Kendricks. Both boys shared a love of singing, and sang in their church choir together. As teenagers, Williams, Kendricks, and Kell Osborne and Willie Waller performed in a secular singing group known as The Cavaliers, with dreams of making it big in the music industry. In 1957, Williams, Kendricks, and Osborne left Birmingham to start careers, leaving Waller behind. Now known as the Primes, the trio moved to Cleveland, Ohio, and eventually found a manager in Milton Jenkins, who moved the group to Detroit, Michigan. Although the Primes never recorded, they were successful performers, and even launched a spin-off female group called the Primettes, who later became the Supremes.

In 1960, Kell Osborne moved to California, and the Primes disbanded. Kendricks returned to Alabama, but visited Paul in Detroit shortly after. While on this visit, he and Paul had learned that Otis Williams, head of a rival Detroit act known as the Distants, had two openings in his group's lineup. Paul Williams and Kendricks joined Otis Williams, Melvin Franklin, and Elbridge Bryant to form the Elgins, who signed to the local Motown label in 1961, after first changing their name to the Temptations.

== Career ==
=== The Temptations ===
Although the group now had a record deal, Paul Williams and his bandmates endured a long series of failed singles before finally hitting the Billboard Top 20 in 1964 with "The Way You Do the Things You Do". More hits quickly followed, including "My Girl", "Ain't Too Proud To Beg" and "(I Know) I'm Losing You".

Although Williams had been the group's original lead singer during its formative years, by 1965, his role had been eclipsed by David Ruffin and Eddie Kendricks, who had both sung lead on Temptations hit singles. As such, Williams was often overlooked for leads, even on album tracks and B-sides, prompting him to complain, "Shit, I can sing too!" In response, he was given lead vocals on the song "Don't Look Back" (1965).

Williams sang lead on several of the group's songs, and served as the main lead singer during the group's early years. His early leads include, "Your Wonderful Love" (1961), "Slow Down Heart" (1962), "I Want a Love I Can See" (1963), and "Oh, Mother of Mine" (1961) (the group's first single) and "Farewell My Love" (1963) both shared with Eddie Kendricks. Considered the Temptations' best dancer, Williams served as the group's original choreographer, devising routines for his group and the Supremes (most notably their trademark "Stop! In the Name of Love" routine), before Cholly Atkins took over that role for all of Motown's acts. Williams' later leads on Temptations songs include "Just Another Lonely Night" (1965), "No More Water in the Well" (1967), and a cover version of "Hey Girl" (originally by Freddie Scott) released in 1969.

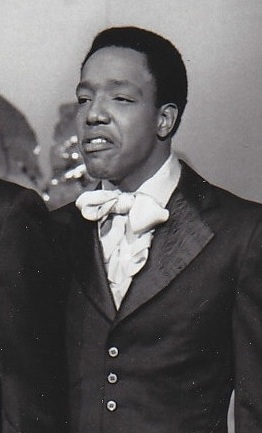
Williams performs with the Temptations on The Ed Sullivan Show, 1969

Williams also sang lead with Dennis Edwards, who joined in 1968, on Motown's first Grammy Award winner, "Cloud Nine". One of his best-known lead performances is his standout live performance of "For Once in My Life", from the television special TCB, originally broadcast on December 9, 1968, on NBC. On the same special, Williams sang lead vocals on "Hello Young Lovers", as well as performed "The Impossible Dream" and "Respect" as a duet with Diana Ross.

=== Personal problems and decline ===
Williams suffered from sickle-cell anemia, which frequently wrought havoc on his physical health. In 1965, Williams began an affair with Winnie Brown, a hair stylist for the Supremes and relative of Supremes member Florence Ballard. Williams was in love with Brown, but remained devoted to his wife and five young children. Williams was also depressed because Cholly Atkins' presence now made Williams' former role as choreographer essentially, but not completely, obsolete. While other members of the Temptations were habitual drinkers, Williams became an alcoholic. Early in his career, he reportedly drank nothing stronger than milk, due to the tightly scheduled tours for most of the year and as a way to self-medicate his sickle-cell anemia. Otis Williams recounted, "to see a guy come from drinking milk to drinking, sometimes, two to three fifths of Courvoisier a day—that was kind of hard to take."

During the spring of 1969, Williams and Brown opened the Celebrity House West, a celebrity fashion boutique, in downtown Detroit. The business was not as successful as planned, and Williams soon found himself owing more than $80,000 in taxes (US$702,359 in 2025 dollars). Williams' health had deteriorated to the point that he would sometimes be unable to perform, suffering from combinations of exhaustion and pain which he combated with heavy drinking and smoking cigarettes. Each of the other four Temptations did what they could to help Williams, alternating between raiding and draining his alcohol stashes, personal interventions, and keeping oxygen tanks backstage. Ultimately, Williams' health, as well as the quality of his performances, continued to decline and he refused to see a doctor.

Because Williams' voice had become ravaged due to his respiratory illness and alcoholism, the Temptations decided to resort to enlisting a fill-in for him. Richard Street, then the lead singer of fellow Motown act the Monitors and formerly lead singer of the Distants, was hired to travel with the Temptations and sing all of Williams' parts, save for Williams' special numbers such as "The Impossible Dream" and "For Once in My Life", from backstage behind a curtain. When Williams was not well enough to go on, Street took his place onstage. In April 1971, Williams was finally persuaded to go see a doctor. The doctor found a spot on Williams' liver and advised him to retire from the group altogether. Williams left the group and Street became his permanent replacement. In support of helping Williams get back on his feet, he was paid his one-fifth share of the group's royalties, and kept on the payroll as an advisor and choreographer for the next two years.

=== Attempted solo career ===
By early 1973, Williams began recording solo material for Motown. Kendricks, who had quit the Temptations just before Williams left, produced and co-wrote Williams' first single, "Feel Like Givin' Up", with "Once You Had a Heart" as its b-side. However, by the following summer, Motown declined to release the single.

== Death ==
On August 17, 1973, Williams was found dead inside a car parked in an alley, wearing only swimming trunks. He had just left the new house of his then-girlfriend after an argument and a gun was found near his body. Williams' death was ruled an apparent suicide. According to Otis Williams, Paul had expressed suicidal thoughts to him and Melvin Franklin months before his death.

On August 24, Williams' funeral was held at the Tried Stone Baptist Church, with his family and former bandmates in attendance. Williams was survived by his wife, Mary Agnes Williams, and five children: Sarita, Kenneth, Paula, Mary, and Paul Jr. Paul Jr. later joined a Temptations splinter group, the Temptations Review featuring Dennis Edwards. Williams also had three other children, Paul Williams Lucas, Anthony Johnson, and Derrick Vinyard, with three girlfriends. He is buried at Lincoln Memorial Park Cemetery in Clinton Township, Macomb County, Michigan.

The circumstances surrounding Williams' death caused the Williams family to suspect that some form of foul play was the actual cause of his death. According to the coroner, Williams had used his right hand to shoot himself on the left side of his head. A bottle of alcohol was also found near Williams' left side, as if he had dropped it while being shot. The gun used in the shooting was found to have fired two shots, only one of which had killed Williams.

== Legacy ==
As a member of the Temptations, Paul Williams, Sr. was posthumously inducted into the Rock and Roll Hall of Fame in 1989, the Vocal Group Hall of Fame in 1999, and the Rhythm and Blues Music Hall of Fame in 2013. Both of his solo recordings were later released by Motown on Temptations-related compilations in the 1980s and 1990s.

In 1998, NBC aired The Temptations, a four-hour television miniseries based on Otis Williams' autobiographical book. Paul Williams was portrayed by actor Christian Payton.

The music video for the Diana Ross song "Missing You" pays tribute to Marvin Gaye, Florence Ballard, Tammi Terrell, and Paul Williams, all former Motown artists who had died.

== Sources ==
- Williams, Otis; Romanowski, Patricia (2002) [1988]. Temptations. Lanham, Maryland: Cooper Square Press. ISBN 0-8154-1218-5.
- Ribowsky, Mark (2010). Ain't Too Proud to Beg: The Troubled Lives and Enduring Soul of the Temptations. Hoboken, New Jersey: John Wiley & Sons. ISBN 978-0-470-26117-0.
