= Otis Williams =

American singer (born 1941)

- Williams in 1999

Background information
- Born: Otis Miles Jr. October 30, 1941 (age 85); Texarkana, Texas, U.S.
- Origin: Detroit, Michigan, U.S.
- Genres: R&B; soul; disco
- Occupations: Singer; songwriter; producer
- Years active: 1957–present
- Labels: Warwick; Motown; Atlantic; New Door/Universal

Otis Williams (born Otis Miles Jr.; October 30, 1941) is an American second tenor/baritone singer. He is occasionally also a songwriter and a record producer. Williams is a co-founder and last surviving original member of the Motown vocal group the Temptations, a group in which he continues to perform; he also owns the rights to the Temptations name.

== Early life ==
Williams was born Otis Miles Jr. in Texarkana, Texas, to Otis Miles and Hazel Louise Williams. The couple separated shortly after their son's birth. While he was still a toddler, his mother married and moved to Detroit, Michigan, leaving the young Otis to be raised by both of his grandmothers in Texarkana.

Hazel Williams moved her son to Detroit when he was ten years old, where he lived with her and his stepfather.

== Career ==
=== 1950s–1990s ===
Becoming interested in music as a teenager, Otis Miles Jr. adopted his mother's maiden name for his stage name, and as Otis Williams put together a number of singing groups. These groups included Otis Williams and the Siberians, the El Domingoes, and the Distants. In 1959, the Distants scored a local hit, co-written by Williams and their producer Johnnie Mae Matthews, & manager Milton Jenkins called "Come On", with lead vocals by Richard Street. Later Distants recordings were not as successful, and after an offer from Berry Gordy of Motown Records, Williams and his friends/bandmates Elbridge "Al" Bryant and Melvin Franklin while Peewee Crawford & Richard Street quit the Distants. Eddie Kendricks and Paul Williams from The Primes later joined Williams, Bryant, and Franklin to create the Elgins, who signed to Motown in March 1961 as "The Temptations", after being told another group was already using that name.

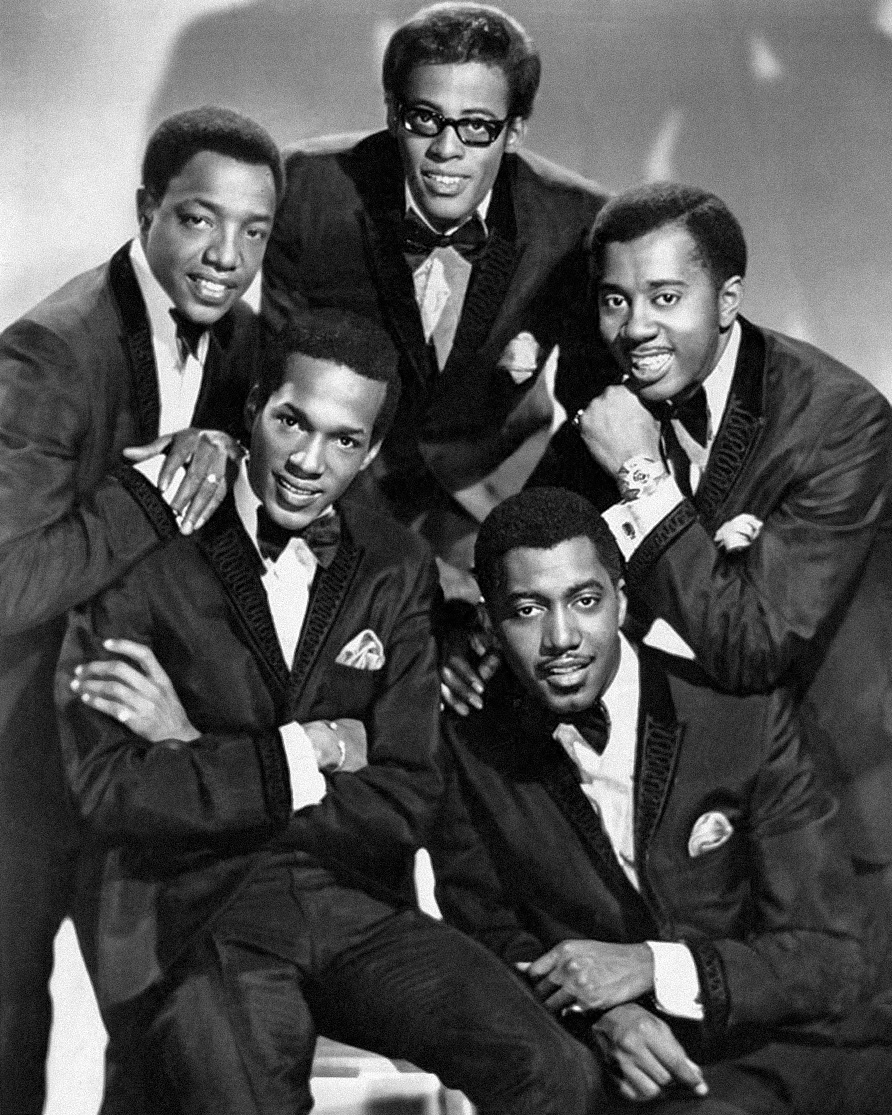
Williams (bottom right) with the Temptations in 1967.

The Temptations became one of the most successful acts in soul music over the course of nearly five decades, during which singers such as David Ruffin, Dennis Edwards, former Distant Richard Street, Damon Harris, Ron Tyson, Ali-Ollie Woodson, Theo Peoples, Ray Davis and former Spinners singer G. C. Cameron have all been members. As a member of the Temptations, he sings both Tenor and Baritone vocals.

The Temptations' biggest selling tracks include "My Girl" and "(I Know) I'm Losing You", among many others. The groups have won four Grammy Awards, and have been nominated for nine.

Although he has served the longest tenure in the Temptations, Williams rarely sings lead, focusing instead on his role as the group's leader and organizer, and as the background "baritone in the middle". Rare showcases for Williams singing lead include the Smokey Robinson and Eddie Kendricks-written track "Don't Send Me Away" from the LP The Temptations with a Lot o' Soul (1967) and the Norman Whitfield-penned tune "I Ain't Got Nothing" from 1972's All Directions. He also sang the intro to the early group song "Check Yourself" (1961). Perhaps most notably, he performed live lead vocals on "This Guy's in Love with You" from the 1968 albums Live at London's Talk of the Town and Diana Ross & The Supremes Join the Temptations.

Williams has provided non-singing (spoken word) contributions to some Temptation songs, including: "I'm Gonna Make You Love Me" (1968, a hit duet with Diana Ross and Eddie Kendricks sharing the lead vocals); "I'm the Exception to the Rule", from the album Sky's the Limit (1971) which features leads from both Eddie Kendricks and Dennis Edwards; during the opening verse of "Masterpiece" (1973); and "For Your Love", which is done in a medley with "You Send Me" (led by Ali-Ollie Woodson) on the For Lovers Only album (1995).

=== 1990s–present ===
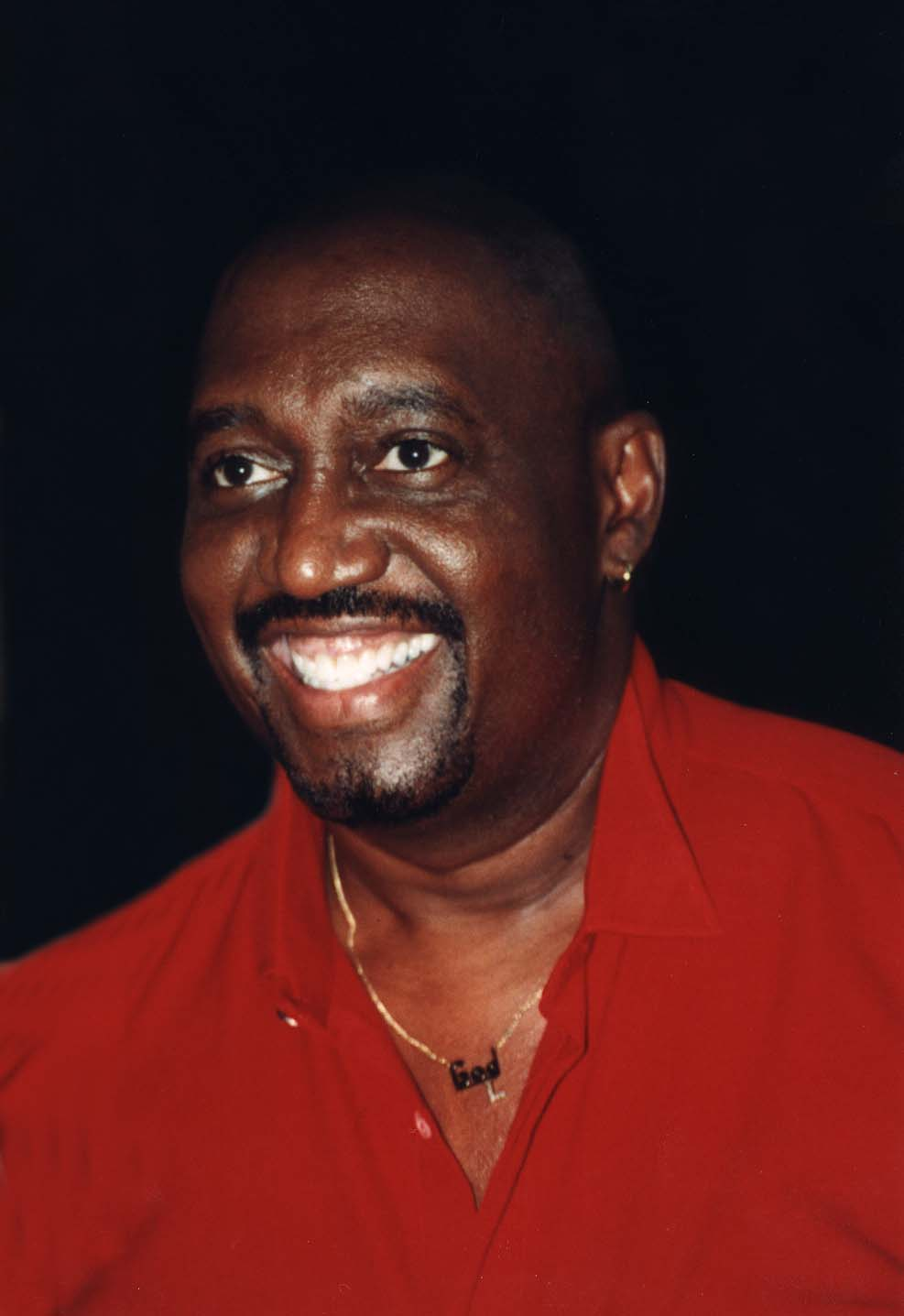
Williams in 1999

The Temptations lineup changes were so frequent, stressful and troublesome that Williams and Melvin Franklin promised each other they would never quit the group. Franklin would remain in the group until 1994, when he became physically incapable of continuing. Franklin died on February 23, 1995, leaving Otis Williams, then 53, as the last surviving original member of the quintet.

Williams still remains in the Temptations as of July 2026, and has performed on every release by the band, including their most recent studio album, Temptations 60, released on January 28, 2022, which also included a collaboration with Motown artist Smokey Robinson.

== Additional works ==
Williams is the co-author, with Patricia Romanowski, of Temptations, a 1988 book that served as both his autobiography and a history of the group. Ten years later, the book was adapted into an NBC television miniseries The Temptations. Williams was portrayed by actor Charles Malik Whitfield.

== Personal life ==
Williams married Josephine Rogers in 1961; the couple's son, Otis Lamont Miles, was born the same year. He and Josephine divorced in 1964. Otis Lamont Miles was a construction worker who died from falling off a building in a workplace accident in Detroit in 1985.

Williams was married to Ann Cain from 1967 to 1973. Cain was Ike Turner and Tina Turner's housekeeper. He married his third wife, Arleata "Goldie" Williams (née Carter), in 1983–1997. Arleata Williams' daughter Elan Carter was Playboy's Playmate of the Month for June 1994.

== Awards and honors ==
In 1989, Williams was inducted into the Rock and Roll Hall of Fame as a member of the Temptations. He received an honorary doctorate from Stillman College in May 2006.

== In popular culture ==
- Charles Malik Whitfield portrayed Williams in the 1998 NBC-TV miniseries The Temptations.
- Aint Too Proud: The Life and Times of the Temptations, a musical based on Williams' memoir The Temptations premiered at Berkeley Repertory Theater in September 2017. Williams was played by Derrick Baskin. The show then reached Broadway's Imperial Theater, opening March 21, 2019. The musical debuted on the West End in the Prince Edward Theatre in 2023.
