= Melvin Franklin =

American bass singer (1942–1995)

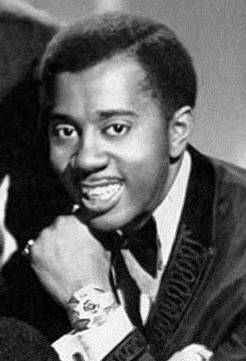
- Franklin in 1964

Background information
- Born: David Melvin English; October 12, 1942; Montgomery, Alabama, U.S.
- Died: February 23, 1995 (aged 52) Los Angeles, California, U.S.
- Genres: R&B; soul
- Occupation: Singer
- Years active: 1958–1995
- Formerly of: The Temptations

David Melvin English (October 12, 1942 – February 23, 1995), better known by the stage name Melvin Franklin or his nickname "Blue", was an American bass singer. Franklin was best known for his distinctive very deep voice and role as a founding member of Motown singing group The Temptations from 1961 to 1995.

== Early life ==
David English was born in Montgomery, Alabama to Rose English, a teenage mother from nearby Mobile. His biological father was the preacher of the English family's church in Mobile; he impregnated her through rape. Following David's birth, Rose English married Willard Franklin and moved to Detroit. Her grandmother however insisted on raising young David and was left behind in her care. David English later moved to Detroit with his mother and stepfather in 1952 at age ten.

Taking on his stepfather's surname for his stage name as a teenager, David English—now Melvin Franklin—was a member of a number of local singing groups in Detroit, including The Voice Masters with Lamont Dozier and David Ruffin, and frequently performed with Richard Street. In 1959, the Voice Masters signed with Anna Records, a label co-founded by Berry Gordy's sister Anna. The group recorded several singles, including "Needed" and "Hope and Pray". Franklin often affectionately referred to Street and Ruffin as his "cousins" (although they were not related). Around this time, Franklin romantically pursued future Supremes singer Mary Wilson.

== Career ==
=== 1958–1960: Early career ===
In 1958, Otis Williams, a classmate of Franklin's at Detroit's Northwestern High School, had formed his own singing group, Otis Williams and the Siberians. The group were negotiating a contract with record producer Johnnie Mae Matthews to record singles. However, Arthur Walton, the group's bass singer, departed the group to finish high school.

To replace him, Williams remembered Franklin from the Voice Masters. He spotted Franklin walking along a nearby neighborhood and rushed him with an offer to join the group as their bass singer. Franklin responded, "Well, I don't know you. You have to ask my momma." Williams explained the situation to Rose Franklin, who agreed to have her son join the group. Vernard Plain, the group's lead singer, also departed the group, in which Franklin brought in Street to replace him.

The Siberians (now renamed Otis Williams and the Distants)—Williams, Franklin, Street, Elbridge "Al" Bryant, and James "Pee Wee" Crawford—recorded at Matthews' Northern Records, releasing singles such as "Come On" (1959) and "Alright" (1960). Around this time, Franklin briefly attended Wayne State University. A dispute over the group's royalties with Matthews led to the termination of their contract with Northern Records. By 1960, the Distants had been reduced to a trio after Street left the group.

=== 1961–1995: The Temptations ===
After losing the Distants name, the remaining members aligned with Paul Williams and Eddie Kendricks to form the Elgins. In March 1961, the Elgins signed with Motown Records under a new name: The Temptations. As a member of the Temptations, Franklin acquired the nickname "Blue" among his groupmates because of his obsession with the Italian song "Nel blu, dipinto di blu" (also known as "Volare" in English).

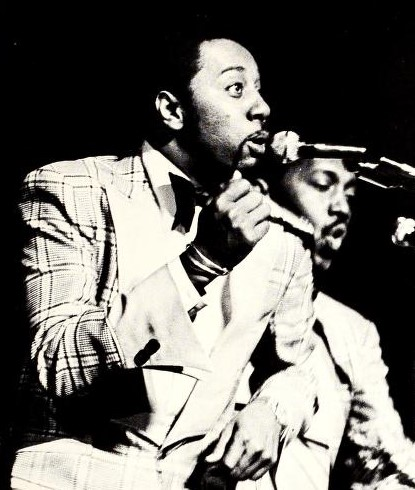
Franklin at Kansas State University in 1971

Franklin and Otis Williams were the only founding Temptations who never left the group. One of the most famous bass singers in music throughout his career, Franklin's deep vocals became one of the group's signature trademarks. Franklin sang a handful of featured leads with the group as well, including the songs "I Truly, Truly Believe" (The Temptations Wish It Would Rain, 1968), "Silent Night" (Give Love At Christmas, 1980), "The Prophet" (A Song for You, 1975), and his signature live performance number, "Ol' Man River". Franklin was usually called upon to deliver ad-libs, harmony vocals, and, during the psychedelic soul era, notable sections of the main verses. Franklin memorably sang the line "and the band played on" from The Temptations' 1970 hit single "Ball of Confusion (That's What the World Is Today)".

In the fall of 1978, Franklin was shot in the hand and leg while trying to stop a carjacking outside of a hair salon in West Hollywood. He had earlier left his vehicle running when he stopped to talk with a female friend. During the struggle, the carjacker recognized Franklin from the Temptations, pushed him out of the car, and sped off. The incident prevented Franklin from participating in the Temptations' upcoming tour of Poland, which at the time was still behind the Iron Curtain. Otis Williams assumed Franklin's bass parts during his recovery. Aside from the Temptations, Franklin also worked as a voice actor. In 1984, he provided the voice for the character of "Wheels" in the animated series Pole Position.

In 1989, Franklin was inducted into the Rock and Roll Hall of Fame as a member of The Temptations. During the summer of 1994, he was rushed to the hospital and diagnosed with necrotizing fasciitis. To save his life, surgeons operated on Franklin's arm, but since he was immunocompromised, Franklin remained at risk for remission. A few months later, in September 1994, the Temptations received a star on the Hollywood Walk of Fame. In January 1995, Franklin's last recording with the Temptations was "Life Is But a Dream" for the album For Lovers Only. After his death, Franklin was replaced with Ray Davis.

== Personal life and death ==
Franklin was married to his second wife, Kimberly, at the time of his death. They had four children. In 1968, Franklin was diagnosed with rheumatoid arthritis, the symptoms of which he combated with cortisone so that he could continue performing. The constant use of cortisone left his immune system vulnerable to other infections and health problems; as a result, Franklin developed diabetes during the early 1980s and later contracted necrotizing fasciitis. To treat his illnesses, Franklin took oxygen tanks with him while on tour.

In January 1995, while recording the album For Lovers Only, Ali-Ollie Woodson and Williams noticed bleeding from Franklin's ankle on his sock. He was taken home to recover but on February 17, Franklin fell into a coma and remained unconscious. Franklin died on February 23, 1995, at Cedars-Sinai Medical Center, at age 52. His funeral was widely attended, with Smokey Robinson commemorating him with the song "Really Gonna Miss You" (a moment recreated for The Temptations miniseries). Franklin is interred at the Forest Lawn Memorial Park in the Hollywood Hills neighborhood of Los Angeles.

In February 2013, Franklin was posthumously awarded a Grammy Lifetime Achievement Award as a member of the Temptations. Six months later, he was inducted into the Rhythm and Blues Music Hall of Fame as a member of The Temptations.

== In popular culture ==
In 1998, Franklin was portrayed by actor D. B. Woodside in the biographical miniseries The Temptations. Franklin's death was portrayed differently from what occurred in reality, with Franklin dying outside of the dining room and in the kitchen of his mother's house. Because Franklin's death was still fresh in the minds of Otis Williams and the miniseries' creators at the time, it was decided that they would deliberately not depict Franklin's death accurately.

In April 1999, Rose Franklin filed suit against Williams, Shelly Berger, David V. Picker, de Passe Entertainment, Hallmark Entertainment, and NBC for unauthorized usage of her name, image and likeness along with the false depiction of her son's death. The lawsuit was joined with several ongoing litigation cases against the miniseries' creators, in which the judges ruled in favor of the defendants. In September 2001, the ruling was upheld at the United States Court of Appeals for the Sixth Circuit.

== Bibliography ==
- Ribowsky, Mark (2010). Ain't Too Proud to Beg: The Troubled Lives and Enduring Soul of the Temptations. Hoboken, New Jersey: John Wiley & Sons. ISBN 978-0-470-26117-0.
- Tobler, John (1992). NME Rock 'N' Roll Years (1st ed.). London: Reed International Books. CN 5585.
- Williams, Otis; Romanowski, Patricia (2002) [1988]. Temptations. Cooper Square Press. ISBN 978-0-815-41218-2.
