= David Ruffin discography =

Discography list

- Studio albums: 12
- Compilation albums: 5
- Singles: 35

This article is a discography for the work of former Temptations singer David Ruffin as a solo artist and in other group acts outside of The Temptations. It also includes a listing of his lead vocal recordings with The Temptations.

== Studio and live albums ==
Year	Album	Peak chart positions			Certifications
Year	Album	US	US R&B	UK	Certifications
1969	My Whole World Ended: First studio album; Released: May 1, 1969; Labels: Motown	31	1	—	
1969	Feelin' Good: Second studio album; Released: November 1969; Labels: Motown	148	9	—	
1970	I Am My Brother's Keeper: Only studio album released by The Ruffin Brothers (David Ruffin and Jimmy Ruffin); Released: 1970; Labels: Soul (Motown)	178	15	—	
1971	David: Previously unreleased studio album; Released: June 25, 2004; Labels: Hip-O Records	—	—	—	
1973	David Ruffin: Third studio album; Released: February 1973; Labels: Motown	160	34	—	
1974	Me 'n Rock 'n Roll Are Here to Stay: Fourth studio album; Released: December 1974; Labels: Motown	—	37	—	
1975	Who I Am: Fifth studio album; Released: October 1, 1975; Labels: Motown	31	5	—	
1976	Everything's Coming Up Love: Sixth studio album; Released: May 1, 1976; Labels: Motown	51	16	—	
1977	In My Stride: Seventh studio album; Released: June 1, 1977; Labels: Motown	—	36	—	
1979	So Soon We Change: Eighth studio album; Released: 1979; Labels: Warner Bros. Records	—	19	—	
1980	Gentleman Ruffin: Ninth and final solo studio album; Released: 1980; Labels: Warner Bros. Records	—	66	—	
1985	Live at the Apollo: Live album by Daryl Hall & John Oates featuring Ruffin and Eddie Kendricks; Released: September 30, 1985; Labels: RCA Records	21	41	32	RIAA: Gold
1987	Ruffin & Kendrick: Only studio album released by Ruffin and Eddie Kendricks as a duo; Released: 1987; Labels: RCA Records	—	60	—	
"—" denotes releases that did not chart.

== Compilation albums ==
Year	Album
1977	At His Best: Released: 1977; Labels: Motown
1998	The Ultimate Collection: Collection of Motown solo singles in original 45 RPM single formats; Released: 1998; Labels: Motown
2002	The Essential Collection: Europe and South Africa only; Released: 2002; Labels: Motown/Universal Music
2005	The Great David Ruffin: The Motown Solo Albums, Vol. 1: Compiles My Whole World Ended, Feelin' Good, David Ruffin, and Me 'n Rock 'n Roll Are Here to Stay; Released: August 26, 2005; Labels: Hip-O Select/Motown
2006	The Great David Ruffin: The Motown Solo Albums, Vol. 2: Compiles Who I Am, Everything's Coming Up Love, and In My Stride along with unreleased bonus tracks; Released: October 13, 2006; Labels: Hip-O Select/Motown

== Singles ==
Early singles
Year	Title	B side	Label
1958	"Believe Me"	"You and I"	Vega 1002, as "Little David Bush"
1960	"I'm In Love"	"One of These Days"	Anna 1127
1961	"Actions Speak Louder Than Words"	"You Can Get What I Got"	Check-Mate 1003
1962	"Knock You Out (With Love)"	"Mr. Bus Driver (Hurry)"	Check-Mate 1010

1969–1990
Year	Title	Peak Chart Positions				Album
Year	Title	US	US R&B	US Dance	UK	Album
1969	"My Whole World Ended (The Moment You Left Me)"	9	2	—	51 (Note: Chart position is from the official UK "Breakers List".)	My Whole World Ended
1969	"I've Lost Everything I've Ever Loved"	58	11	—	—	My Whole World Ended
1969	"I'm So Glad I Fell for You"	53	18	—	—	Feelin' Good
1970	"Stand by Me" (duet with Jimmy Ruffin)	61	24	—	—	I Am My Brother's Keeper
1970	"When My Love Hand Comes Down" (with Jimmy Ruffin)	—	—	—	—	I Am My Brother's Keeper
1971	"Each Day Is a Lifetime"	—	—	—	—	David (unreleased album)
1971	"You Can Come Right Back to Me"	—	—	—	—	David (unreleased album)
1972	"A Little More Trust"	—	—	—	—	David Ruffin
1972	"Blood Donors Needed (Give All You Can)"	—	80	—	—	David Ruffin
1973	"Common Man"	—	84	—	—	David Ruffin
1974	"Me and Rock & Roll (Are Here to Stay)"	—	52	—	—	Me 'n Rock 'n Roll Are Here to Stay
1974	"Take Me Clear from Here"	—	—	—	—	Me 'n Rock 'n Roll Are Here to Stay
1975	"Superstar (Remember How You Got Where You Are)"	—	—	—	—	Me 'n Rock 'n Roll Are Here to Stay
1975	"Walk Away from Love"	9	1	6	10	Who I Am
1976	"Heavy Love"	47	8	5	—	Who I Am
1976	"Everything's Coming Up Love"	49	8	—	—	Everything's Coming Up Love
1976	"On and Off"	—	48	—	—	Everything's Coming Up Love
1976	"Discover Me"	—	—	—	—	Everything's Coming Up Love
1977	"Just Let Me Hold You for a Night"	—	18	—	—	In My Stride
1977	"You're My Peace of Mind"	—	71	—	—	In My Stride
1977	"I Can't Stop the Rain"	—	—	—	—	In My Stride
1979	"Break My Heart"	—	9	—	—	So Soon We Change
1979	"I Get Excited"	—	79	—	—	So Soon We Change
1980	"Slow Dance"	—	63	—	—	Gentleman Ruffin
1980	"I Wanna Be with You"	—	—	—	—	Gentleman Ruffin
1985	"A Night at the Apollo Live!" (with Eddie Kendricks, Daryl Hall & John Oates)	20	40	—	58	Live at the Apollo
1987	"I Couldn't Believe It" (with Eddie Kendricks)	—	14	—	85	Ruffin & Kendrick
1987	"One More for the Lonely Hearts Club" (with Eddie Kendricks)	—	43	—	—	Ruffin & Kendrick
1990	"Hurt the One You Love"	—	—	—	—	—N/a
"—" denotes releases that did not chart or were not released in that territory.

== Group singles outside of The Temptations ==
=== The Voice Masters ===
Year	Title	Catalogue number
1958	"Hope and Pray" b/w "Oops I'm Sorry"	Anna 101
1958	"Needed" b/w "Needed (For Lovers Only)"	Anna 1012
1960	"Everything About You" b/w "Orphan Boy"	Anna 1114
1960	"Every Time" b/w "I'm Free"	Anna 1123
1960	"In Love in Vain" b/w "Two Lovers"	Frisco 15235

== Complete lead vocals with the Temptations ==
- The Temptations Sing Smokey (1965)
  - "My Girl" (Robinson, Ronald White)
  - "You'll Lose a Precious Love" (Robinson) – Recorded on March 2, 1964, it's the first lead Ruffin recorded with the group.
  - "It's Growing" (Robinson, Warren Moore)
  - "Who's Lovin' You" (Robinson)
  - "You've Really Got a Hold on Me" (Robinson) – Ruffin and Paul Williams sings "the unison harmony co-lead vocal" with Eddie Kendrick
- The Temptin' Temptations (1965)
  - "Since I Lost My Baby" (Robinson, Moore)
  - "My Baby" (Robinson, Moore, Robert Rogers)
  - "Born to Love You" (Ivy Jo Hunter, William "Mickey" Stevenson) – shared with Eddie Kendrick
  - "You're the One I Need" (Robinson) – Ruffin sings the bridge with Paul Williams while Kendrick leads the rest of the song
- Gettin' Ready (1966)
  - "Say You" (Charles Jones, Robert Dobyne, Robert Staunton)
  - "Little Miss Sweetness" (Robinson)
  - "Ain't Too Proud to Beg" (Edward Holland, Jr., Norman Whitfield)
- Greatest Hits (1966)
  - "Beauty Is Only Skin Deep" (recorded in 1966, E. Holland, Whitfield)
- Temptations Live! (1966)
  - "I Want a Love I Can See" (Robinson) – shared with Paul Williams (who was the only lead on the studio version) and Eddie Kendrick for this live performance
  - "Yesterday"/"What Now My Love" (John Lennon, Paul McCartney, Gilbert Bécaud, Pierre Delanoë, Carl Sigman) – Ruffin does a soulful rendition of McCartney's "Yesterday". He also sings Bécaud's "What Now My Love" with Melvin Franklin doing speaking parts in French.
- The Temptations with a Lot o' Soul (1967)
  - "(I Know) I'm Losing You" (Cornelius Grant, E. Holland, Whitfield)
  - "Ain't No Sun Since You've Been Gone" (Grant, Sylvia Moy, Whitfield)
  - "All I Need" (Frank Wilson, E. Holland, R. Dean Taylor)
  - "(Loneliness Made Me Realize) It's You That I Need" (E. Holland, Whitfield)
  - "Just One Last Look" (Holland-Dozier-Holland)
  - "Sorry Is a Sorry Word" (E. Holland, Hunter)
  - "You're My Everything" (Roger Penzabene, Grant, Whitfield) – shared with Eddie Kendrick
  - "Now That You've Won Me" (Robinson)
- The Temptations in a Mellow Mood (1967)
  - "Hello, Young Lovers" (Richard Rodgers, Oscar Hammerstein II) – vocal ensemble; Ruffin has brief solos
  - "Somewhere" (Leonard Bernstein, Stephen Sondheim)
  - "I'm Ready for Love" (Holland-Dozier-Holland)
  - "What Now My Love" (Bécaud, Delanoë, Sigman)
  - "The Impossible Dream" (Joe Darion, Mitch Leigh)
- The Temptations Wish It Would Rain (1968)
  - "I Could Never Love Another (After Loving You)" (Penzabene, Barrett Strong, Whitfield)
  - "Cindy" (Robinson)
  - "I Wish It Would Rain" (Penzabene, Strong, Whitfield)
  - "Fan the Flame" (Al Cleveland, Terry "Buzzy" Johnson, Robinson)
  - "He Who Picks a Rose" (E. Holland, Emilio "Father" Smiley, Whitfield)
  - "Why Did You Leave Me Darling" (James Dean, Deke Richards)
  - "I've Passed This Way Before" (Dean, William Weatherspoon)
- Later releases (found on the Emperors of Soul box set released in 1994 and the Lost and Found: You've Got to Earn It (1962–1968) LP released in 1999)
  - "I Got Heaven Right Here on Earth" (recorded in 1966, Eddie Kendrick, E. Holland)
  - "Angel Doll" (recorded in 1967) (Morris Broadnax, Clarence Paul, Stevie Wonder)
  - "What Am I Gonna Do Without You" (recorded in 1966, Hunter, Wonder)
  - "Love Is What You Make It" (Robinson)
  - "I Know She's Not a Mannequin" (John Bristol, Shena Dermell, Harvey Fuqua)
  - "Only a Lonely Man Would Know" (Hunter, Beatrice Verdi)
  - "That'll Be the Day" (recorded in 1965, Henry Cosby, Moy, Stevenson)
  - "We'll Be Satisfied" (recorded in 1967, Marc Gordon, F. Wilson) – shared with Eddie Kendrick and Paul Wiliams
