= Steve Gadd discography =

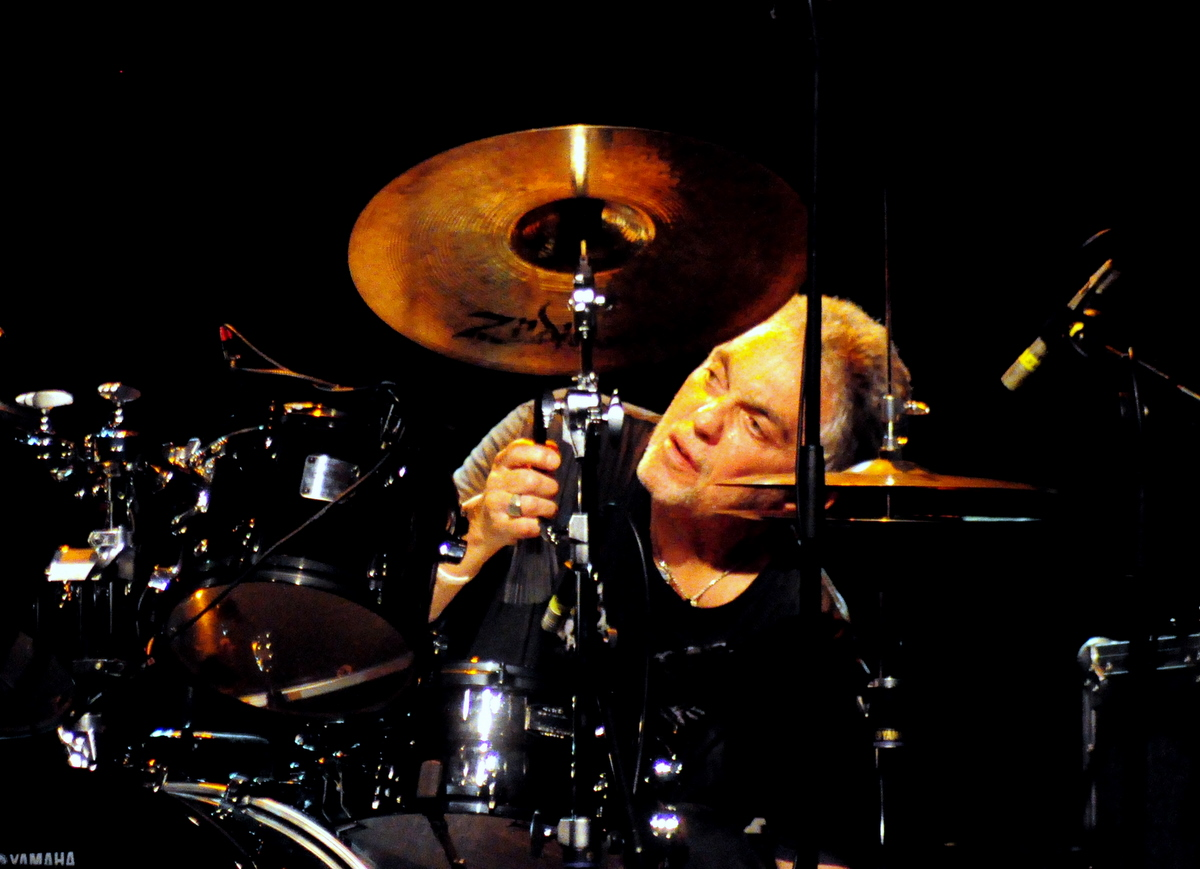
- Gadd in 2010

This article present the discography of the American drummer and session musician Steve Gadd (born 1945). This discography contains over 700 original studio and live album releases; it does not include singles, EPs, unofficial releases, greatest hits / best-of compilations, or video only releases.

== As leader/co-leader ==
=== As Blicher Hemmer Gadd ===
- Blicher Hemmer Gadd (C-Nut, 2014)
- Omara (C-Nut, 2018)
- Get That Motor Runnin' (C-Nut, 2019)

=== As The Boys From Rochester ===
- The Boys From Rochester (Feels So Good Records, 1989)

=== As The Chick Corea + Steve Gadd Band ===
- Chinese Butterfly (Stretch, 2017)

=== As Steve Gadd + Eddie Gomez + Ronnie Cuber + WDR Big Band ===
- Center Stage (Leopard|Leopard, 2022)

=== As The Gaddabouts ===
- The Gaddabouts (RacecarLOTTA Records, 2011)
- Look Out Now! (RacecarLOTTA Records, 2012)

=== As Manhattan Jazz Quintet ===
- Manhattan Jazz Quintet (King, 1984)
- Autumn Leaves (King, 1985)
- My Funny Valentine (King, 1985)
- The Sidewinder (King, 1986)
- Live at Pit Inn (Paddle Wheel, 1986)
- Live at the Pit Inn Vol 2 (King, 1986)
- My Favourite Things Live in Tokyo (King, 1987)
- Manhattan Jazz Quintet Reunion - Manhattan Blues (Sweet Basil, 1990)
- Concierto De Aranjuez (Sweet Basil, 1994)
- V.S.O.P. (Very Special Onetime Performance) (Birds Records, 2008)

=== As Mika & Steve Gadd ===
- Mikarimba! (Video Arts Japan/Zoom, 2010)

=== As Steve Gadd Band ===
- Gaddabout (Electric Bird, 1984)
- Gadditude (BFM Jazz, 2013)
- 70 Strong (BFM Jazz, 2015)
- Way Back Home (Live from Rochester, NY) (BFM Jazz, 2016)
- Steve Gadd Band (BFM Jazz, 2018)
- At Blue Note Tokyo (BFM Jazz, 2021)

=== As Steve Gadd & Friends ===
- Live at Voce – Deluxe Edition (BFM Jazz, 2010)

=== As The Gadd Gang ===
- Gaddabout (Electric Bird, 1984)
- The Gadd Gang (Columbia, 1986)
- Here & Now (Columbia, 1988)
- Live at Bottom Line (A Touch, 1994)

=== As Hyper Ventures ===
- Hyper Ventures (InsideOut, 1992)

=== As Simon Oslender / Steve Gadd / Will Lee ===
- All That Matters (Leopard, 2024)
- On A Roll (Leopard, 2025)

=== As Anders Wihk Steve Gadd Svante Henryson ===
- Same Tree Different Fruit (Lionheart/Videoarts, 2012)

== As sideman ==
=== With 10cc ===
- Windows in the Jungle (Mercury, 1983)

=== With Aquarium ===
- Top (M2, 2021)

=== With Alessi ===
- All for a Reason (A&M, 1977)

=== With Peter Allen ===
- Continental American (A&M, 1974)

=== With Herb Alpert ===
- Beyond (A&M Records, 1980)
- Blow Your Own Horn (track 1 only) (A&M, 1983)

=== With Laurie Anderson ===
- Strange Angels (Warner Bros, 1989)

=== With Arthur, Hurley & Gottlieb ===
- Arther, Hurley & Gottlieb (Columbia, 1973)

=== With Ashford & Simpson ===
- Come As You Are (Warner Bros, 1976)
- So So Satisfied (Warner Bros, 1977)
- Stay Free (Warner Bros, 1979)

=== With Patti Austin ===
- End of a Rainbow (CTI, 1976)

=== With Aztec Camera ===
- Love (On track "Paradise") (Sire, 1987)

=== With Philip Bailey ===
- Love Will Find a Way (Verve Records, 2019)

=== With Chet Baker ===
- She Was Too Good to Me (CTI, 1974)

=== With Chet Baker Jim Hall Hubert Laws ===
- Studio Trieste, (CTI 9007, 1982)

=== With Tony Banks ===
- The Fugitive (tracks "Man of Spells", "And the Wheels Keep Turning", "By You", and "Sometime Never") (Charisma UK, Atlantic, US, 1983)

=== With Gato Barbieri ===
- Ruby, Ruby, (A&M, 1977) (Track: "Sunrise")

=== With Ray Barretto ===
- La Cuna (CTI Records, 1981)

=== With Keith Barrow ===
- Just As I Am (Capitol Records, 1980)

=== With Bazuka ===
- Bazuka (A&M, 1975)

=== With Joe Beck ===
- Friends (DMP, 1984)

=== With Bee Gees ===
- Living Eyes (RSO, 1981)

=== With Maggie Bell ===
- Queen of the Night, (Atlantic, 1974)

=== With George Benson ===
- Bad Benson (CTI, 1974)
- In Concert-Carnegie Hall (CTI, 1976)
- Good King Bad (CTI, 1976)
- Livin' Inside Your Love (Warner Bros, 1979)
- Pacific Fire (CTI, 1983)
- In Your Eyes (Warner Bros, 1983)
- Absolute Benson (GRP/Verve, 2000)

=== With Bob Berg ===
- Riddles (Stretch, 1994)

=== With Warren Bernhardt ===
- Manhattan Update (Arista Novus, 1980)

=== With Randy Bernsen ===
- Mo' Wasabi (Zebra Records, 1986)
- Paradise Citizens (Zebra Records, 1988)

=== With Stephen Bishop ===
- Red Cab to Manhattan (Track 4 only) (Warner Bros, 1980)

=== With Marc Black ===
- Stroke of Genius (Suma, 2006)
- Pictures of The Highway (Suma, 2010)

=== With John Blair ===
- We Belong Together (CTI, 1977)

=== With Carla Bley ===
- Dinner Music (Watt/ECM, 1977)

=== With Rory Block ===
- Turning Point (Zensor/Amalthea/Munich Records BV, 1989)

=== With Angela Bofill ===
- Angie (GRP, 1978)

=== With Luiz Bonfá ===
- Manhattan Strut (Paddle Wheel, 1997) (The Steve Gadd official discography has this as a 1988 release, however the original recording date is believed to be 1974)

=== With Brecker Brothers ===
- Back to Back (Arista, 1976)
- Don't Stop the Music (Arista, 1977)
- Detente (Arista, 1980)

=== With Edie Brickell ===
- Picture Perfect Morning (Geffen Records, 1994)
- Volcano (Cherry Records/Universal, 2003)

=== With Willy Bridges ===
- Bridges to Cross (Buddah Records, 1977)

=== With Brigati ===
- Lost in the Wilderness (Elektra, 1976)

=== With Jonatha Brooke ===
- The Works (Bad Dog Records, 2008)
- My Mother has 4 Noses (Bad Dog Records, 2014)

=== With Alison Brown ===
- The Song of the Banjo (Compass Records, 2015)

=== With Joe Brucato ===
- Free (Number 44, 2014)

=== With Rusty Bryant ===
- For the Good Times (Prestige, 1973)

=== With Kate Bush ===
- Director's Cut (Fish People/EMI, 2011)
- 50 Words for Snow (Fish People, 2011)

=== With Ed Calle ===
- Double Talk (Columbia, 1996)

=== With Larry Carlton ===
- Sleepwalk (Warner Bros, 1982)

=== With Karen Carpenter ===
- Karen Carpenter (A&M, 1996)

=== With Paul Carrack ===
- These Days (Carrack-UK, 2018)

=== With Barbara Carroll ===
- From the Beginning (United Artists Records, 1977)

=== With Milton Chesley Carroll ===
- Milton Chesley Carroll (RCA, 1972)

=== With Ron Carter ===
- Anything Goes (Kudo, 1975)
- Yellow & Green (Steve Gadd only appears on bonus tracks 7 & 8 of the 1987 re-issue and was not on the original 1976 release) (Epic, 1987)

=== With Mike Catalano ===
- A Rio Affair (MARACUJAZZ, 1990)
- A Manhattan Affair (Catman Records, 2007)

=== With Harry Chapin ===
- Dance Band on the Titanic (Elektra, 1977)

=== With Tracy Chapman ===
- Our Bright Future (Elektra, 2008)

=== With Ray Charles ===
- My World (Warner Bros, 1993)

=== With Chevy Chase ===
- Chevy Chase (Arista, 1980)

=== With Cyrus Chestnut ===
- A Charlie Brown Christmas (Atlantic, 2000)

=== With The Choice 4 ===
- The Choice 4 (RCA Victor, 1975)

=== With Tony Cicco ===
- Pá (RCA/RCA Italiana, 1989)

=== With Cinque ===
- Catch A Corner (Alma Records, 2012)

=== With Chiara Civello ===
- Last Quarter Moon (Verve, 2005)

=== With Eric Clapton ===
- Pilgrim (Reprise, 1998)
- Reptile (Reprise, 2001)
- One More Car, One More Rider (Duck/Reprise, 2002)
- Me and Mr. Johnson (Reprise, 2004)
- Sessions for Robert J. (Reprise, 2004)
- Back Home (Duck/Reprise, 2005)
- Old Sock (Surfdog/Duck Records/ADA U.S. Polydor EU, 2013)
- Slowhand at 70 - Live at the Royal Albert Hall (Eagle Vision, 2015)
- Crossroads Guitar Festival 2019 (Rhino/Reprise Records, 2020)
- The Lady in the Balcony: Lockdown Sessions (Universal Music Group, 2021)

=== With Alain Clark ===
- Live It Out (8Ball Music, 2007)
- Colorblind (8Ball Music, 2010)

=== With Stanley Clarke ===
- Journey to Love (Nemperor, 1975)
- School Days (Nemperor/Epic, 1976)
- Modern Man (Cymbal first and last track) (Nemperor, 1978)
- I Wanna Play For You (Nemperor, 1979)

=== With Merry Clayton ===
- Keep Your Eye on the Sparrow (Ode, 1975)

=== With Joe Cocker ===
- Stingray (A&M, 1976)
- Luxury You Can Afford (Asylum, 1978)

=== With Marc Cohn ===
- Marc Cohn (Atlantic, 1991)

=== With Mark Colby ===
- Serpentine Fire (Zappan Tee Records/Columbia, 1978)
- One Good Turn (Zappan Tee Records, 1979)

=== With Natalie Cole ===
- Snowfall on the Sahara (Elektra, 1999)

=== With Judy Collins ===
- Judith (Elektra, 1975)
- Bread and Roses (Elektra, 1976)

=== With Michael Colombier ===
- Michael Colombier (Chrysalis, 1979)

=== With Chick Corea / Return to Forever ===
- The Leprechaun (Polydor, 1976)
- My Spanish Heart (Polydor, 1976)
- The Mad Hatter (Polydor, 1978)
- Friends (Polydor, 1978)
- Three Quartets (Stretch Records, 1981)
- Rendezvous in New York (Stretch Records, 2003)
- The Ultimate Adventure (Stretch Records/Universal, 2006)
- Super Trio - with Chick Corea and Christian McBride (Mad Hatter Productions, 2006)
- Return to the Seventh Galaxy: The Anthology (Although this is mainly a compilation of previously released Return to Forever tracks it contains 3 previously unreleased tracks with Steve Gadd on drums) (Polydor/Verve, 1996)
- Jazz Workshop Boston, MA, May 15, 1973 (Jazz-A-Nova/BSMF Records, 2019)

=== With Cory ===
- Fire Sign (Phantom Records, 1976)

=== With Larry Coryell ===
- Difference (on track Memphis Underground) (Egg, 1978)

=== With Lou Courtney ===
- Buffalo Smoke (RCA Victor, 1976)

=== With Hank Crawford ===
- I Hear a Symphony (Kudu, 1975)
- Hank Crawford's Back (Kudu, 1976)
- Tico Rico (Kudu, 1977)
- Cajun Sunrise (Kudu, 1978)

=== With Randy Crawford & Joe Sample ===
- Feeling good (PRA, 2007)
- No Regrets (PRA, 2008)
- Randy Crawford & Joe Sample Live with Steve Gadd & Niklas Sample (PRA, 2012)

=== With Creme d'Cocoa ===
- Funked Up (Venture Records, 1978)

=== With Jim Croce ===
- I Got a Name (ABC US, Vertigo UK, 1973)

=== With Christopher Cross ===
- Another Page (Warner Bros, 1983)

=== With Beppe Crovella ===
- Soulful Traffic (Electromantic Music, 2010)

=== With Ronnie Cuber ===
- Pin Point (Electric Bird, 1986)

=== With Paquito D'Rivera ===
- Explosion (Columbia, 1986)

=== With Jorge Dalto & Super Friends ===
- Rendezvous (Eastworld, 1983)
- New York Nightline (Eastworld, 1984)

=== With Pino Daniele ===
- Ferryboat (EMI, 1985)
- Schizzechea With Love (EMI/Bagaria, 1988)
- La Grande Madre (Blue Drag, 2012)

=== With Eddie Daniels ===
- Morning Thunder (Columbia, 1978)

=== With Rainy Davis ===
- Ouch (Track "Choosey Beggar") (Columbia, 1988)

=== With Stu Daye ===
- Free Parking (Columbia, 1976)

=== With Eumir Deodato ===
- First Cuckoo (MCA, 1975)
- Very Together (MCA, 1976)
- Stereo Sounds (WEA, 2007) (This is believed to be a 1980s release, probably 1986, though no source can be found to verify this)

=== With Jackie DeShannon ===
- Your Baby Is a Lady (Atlantic, 1974)

=== With Hermine Deurloo ===
- Riverbeast (ZenneZ Records, 2019)

=== With Al Di Meola ===
- Land of the Midnight Sun (Columbia, 1976) (track "The Wizard")
- Elegant Gypsy, 1977 (tracks "Flight Over Rio" & "Elegant Gypsy Suite")
- Casino (Columbia, 1978)
- Splendido Hotel (CBS/Columbia, 1980) (tracks "Roller Jubilee" & "Spanish Eyes")
- Electric Rendezvous (Columbia, 1982)
- Tour De Force – Live (Columbia, 1982)
- Orange and Blue (tracks "Theme of the Mothership" & "Casmir") (Tomato, 1994)
- Consequence of Chaos (Telarc, 2006)

=== With Disco Kids ===
- Disco Kids (Dellwood Records,1979)

=== With Smith Dobson ===
- Smithzonian (Night Music Productions, 1986)

=== With Dane Donohue ===
- Dane Donohue (Columbia, 1978)

=== With Urszula Dudziak ===
- Midnight Rain (Arista, 1977)

=== With The Dynamic Superiors ===
- The Sky's the Limit (Venture Records, 1980 but unable to provide citation/P-Vine Records, 2003 re-issue)

=== With East Bounce ===
- East Bounce (One Voice, 1995)

=== With William Eaton ===
- Struggle Buggy (Marlin, 1977)

=== With Eliane Elias ===
- Illusions (Denon, 1987)

=== With Noel Elmowy ===
- Feelin' Good (Expansion Records, 2000) (Track "Shuffle the Deck")

=== With Melissa Errico ===
- Legrand Affair (Sh-K-Boom Records, 2011)

=== With The Explorers ===
- The Explorers (Virgin Records, 1985)

=== With Jon Faddis ===
- Good and Plenty (Buddah Records/Arista, 1979)

=== With Faith Hope and Charity ===
- Life Goes On (RCA Victor, 1976)

=== With Georgie Fame ===
- Cool Cat Blues (Go Jazz, 1989)

=== With Dominick Farinacci ===
- Short Stories (Mack Avenue Records, 2016)

=== With Art Farmer ===
- Crawl Space (CTI, 1977)
- Big Blues with Jim Hall (CTI, 1978)
- Yama with Joe Henderson (CTI, 1979)

=== With Joe Farrell ===
- Penny Arcade (CTI Records, 1973)
- Upon This Rock (CTI Records, 1974)
- La Catedral Y El Toro (Warner Bros, 1977)

=== With Don Felder ===
- American Rock 'n' Roll (BMG, 2019)

=== With Steve Feldman ===
- Steve Feldman (Evolution, 1973)

=== With Maynard Ferguson ===
- Primal Scream (Columbia, 1976)

=== With Roberta Flack ===
- Blue Lights in the Basement (Atlantic, 1977)
- Roberta Flack (album) (Atlantic, 1978)
- I'm the one (Atlantic, 1982)
- Oasis (Atlantic, 1988)

=== With David Foster ===
- River of Love (Rhino/Atlantic, 1990)

=== With Aretha Franklin ===
- With Everything I Feel in Me (Atlantic, 1974)

=== With Michael Franks ===
- The Art Of Tea (Reprise, 1975)
- Burchfield Nines (Warner Bros, 1978)
- Passionfruit (Warner Bros, 1983)
- Skin Dive (Warner Bros, 1985)
- Barefoot on the Beach (Windham Hill, 1999)

=== With French Toast ===
- French Toast (Electric Bird, 1984)

=== With The Friends of Distinction ===
- Reviviscence "Live To Light Again" (RCA Victor, 1975)

=== With David Friesen ===
- Star Dance (Inner City, 1976)

=== With Tomo Fujita ===
- Pure (Tomo Fujita, 2010)

=== With Jun Fukamachi ===
- The Sea of Dirac (Kitty Records, 1977)
- Evening Star (Kitty Records, 1978)
- On The Move (Alfa, 1978)
- Live (credited as: & the New York All Stars) (Alfa, 1978)

=== With Funk Factory ===
- Funk Factory (ATCO/Atlantic, 1975) (Tracks "Watusi Dance", "Rien Ne Va Plus", "Funk It" and "Lilliput")

=== With Fuse One ===
- Ice (GNP Crescendo Record Co, 1984)

=== With Peter Gabriel ===
- OVO (Real World, 2000)
- Up (Geffen, 2002)

=== With Eric Gale ===
- Ginseng Woman (Columbia, 1977)
- Multiplication (Columbia, 1978)
- Part of You (Columbia, 1979)

=== With David Garfield and Friends ===
- Tribute to Jeff Porcaro (Zebra Records, 1997)

=== With Art Garfunkel ===
- Watermark (Columbia, 1977)
- Fate for Breakfast (Columbia, 1979)
- Lefty (Columbia, 1988)
- Songs from a Parent to a Child (Columbia, 1997)
- Some Enchanted Evening (Atco, 2007)

=== With Art Garfunkel & Amy Grant ===
- The Animals' Christmas (Columbia, 1986)

=== With Joey George & Lewis McGehee ===
- Joey George & Lewis McGehee (Lifesong, 1976)

=== With Donny Gerrard ===
- The Romantic (Frequency Records, 1999)

=== With David Gilmour ===
- Luck and Strange (Sony Music Entertainment, 2024)

=== With Giorgio ===
- Giorgio's Party of the Century (Lettera, 2010)

=== With Nikki Giovanni ===
- The Way I Feel (Niktom, 1975)

=== With Eddie Gómez ===
- Gomez (Interface, 1984)
- Mezgo (aka Discovery) (Epic, 1986)
- Power Play (Columbia, 1988)
- Street Smart (Columbia, 1989)

=== With Stéphane Grappelli ===
- Uptown Dance (Columbia, 1978)

=== With Mark Gray ===
- Boogie Hotel (TDK Records, 1982)
- The Silencer (Credited as Mark Gray and Superfriends) (Eastworld, 1984)

=== With Ellie Greenwich ===
- Let it be written let it be sung (Verve, 1973)

=== With Henry Gross ===
- Henry Gross (A&M Records, 1973)
- Release (Lifesong, 1976)

=== With Dave Grusin ===
- One of a Kind (Polydor, 1977)
- Out of the Shadows (GRP, 1982)
- Dave Grusin and the NY-LA Dream Band (GRP, 1984)
- The Orchestral Album (GRP, 1994)

=== With Don Grusin ===
- Laguna Cove (Award Records, 1998)

=== With Wlodek Gulgowski ===
- Soundcheck (Polydor, 1976)

=== With Jim Hall ===
- Concierto (CTI, 1975)

=== With John Hall ===
- John Hall (Asylum Records, 1978)

=== With Johnny Hammond ===
- Higher Ground (Kudu, 1973)

=== With Richard Harris ===
- The Prophet (Atlantic, 1974)

=== With Richie Havens ===
- Connections (Elecktra, 1980)

=== With Michael Lee Hill ===
- Music From Here to Andromeda (Izon Sky/Moment Point, 2007)

=== With Terumasa Hino ===
- Daydream (Flying Disk/Inner City Records, 1980)
- ベスト・コレクション" (JVC, 1990)

=== With Jennifer Holliday ===
- Say You Love Me (Geffen, 1985)
- Get Close to My Love (Geffen, 1987)

=== With Loleatta Holloway ===
- Queen of the Night (Gold Mind, 1978)
- Love Sensation (Gold Mind, 1980)

=== With Freddie Hubbard ===
- Windjammer (Columbia, 1976)

=== With Bobbi Humphrey ===
- Freestyle (Epic, 1978)

=== With Janis Ian ===
- Janis Ian (Columbia, 1978)
- Night Rains (Columbia, 1979)
- Revenge (Beacon Records, 1995)
- God & The FBI (Windham Hill Records, 2000)

=== With Masaru Imada ===
- A Day in the Paradise (Full House, 1983)

=== With Kimiko Itoh ===
- For Lovers Only (A Touch/Columbia, 1987)
- Follow Me (A Touch/Columbia, 1989)
- A Natural Woman (A Touch, 1990)
- Sophisticated Lady (Videoarts Music, 1995)
- An Evening With Kimiko Itoh - Live Concert in New York (Platinum Records, 2007)

=== With Weldon Irvine ===
- Sinbad (RCA, 1976)

=== With Eileen Ivers ===
- Crossing the Bridge (Sony Classical, 1999)

=== With Jackie and Roy ===
- A Wilder Alias (CTI, 1974)

=== With Milt Jackson ===
- Goodbye (CTI, 1973)

=== With Bob James ===
- One (CTI, 1974)
- Two (CTI, 1975)
- BJ4 (CTI, 1977)
- Heads (Tappan Zee Records, 1977)
- Touchdown (Zappan Tee, 1978)
- Lucky Seven (Tracks "Rush Hour" and "Blue Lick") (Zappan Tee, 1979)
- All Around the Town (Zappan Tee Records, 1981)
- Foxie (Zappan Tee Records, 1983)
- The Genie: Themes & Variations from the TV series TAXI (Tappan Zee Records/Columbia, 1983)
- Playin' Hooky (Warner Bros, 1997)
- These are the CTI Years: Live in Japan (Wildlife Records, 2012)

=== With Bob James & David Sanborn ===
- Double Vision (Warner Bros, 1986)
- Quartette Humaine (Okeh, 2013)

=== With Al Jarreau ===
- This Time (Warner Bros, 1980)
- Breakin' Away (Warner Bros, 1981)
- Jarreau (Warner Bros, 1983)
- Tenderness (Reprise Records, 1994)
- Tomorrow Today (GRP, 2000)
- Live at Montreux 1993 (Eagle Records, 2016)

=== With Garland Jeffreys ===
- Ghost Writer (A&M, 1977)
- One-Eyed Jack (A&M, 1978)

=== With Joe and Bing ===
- Joe and Bing (RCA, 1976)

=== With Dr. John ===
- "City Lights" (A&M, 1978)
- Tango Palace (Horizon, 1979)

=== With Gordon Johnson ===
- "Trios 3.0" (tracks 5 & 10) (Tonalities, 2004)

=== With Michel Jonasz ===
- Oú Est La Source (WEA, 1992)
- Michel Jonasz au Zénith (WEA, 1993)
- Où vont les rêves (Capitol Records, 2002)

=== With Jill Jones ===
- Jill Jones (Paisley Park, Warner Bros, 1987)

=== With Rickie Lee Jones ===
- Rickie Lee Jones (Warner Bros, 1979)
- Pirates (Warner Bros, 1981)
- The Magazine (Warner Bros. 1984)

=== With Quincy Jones ===
- Sounds...and Stuff Like That!! (A&M, 1978)
- Q's Jook Joint (Quest, Warner Bros, 1995)

=== With Salena Jones ===
- My Love (JVC, 1981)

=== With The Joneses ===
- Keepin' Up With The Joneses (Mercury, 1974)
- Our Love Long (P-Vine Records, 1992)
- Come Back To Me (P-Vine Records, 1993)

=== With Margie Joseph ===
- Margie (Atlantic, 1975)

=== With Toshiki Kadomatsu ===
- Reasons for Thousand Lovers (OM, 1989)

=== With Jean-Michel Kajdan ===
- Blue Noise (Track "Stevabe") (Blue Citron, 1992)

=== With Karen Kamon ===
- Heart of You (CBS/Columbia, 1984)

=== With Steve Khan ===
- Tightrope (Tappan Zee Records/Columbia, 1977)
- The Blue Man (CBS, 1978)
- Arrows (Columbia, 1979)

=== With B.B. King and Eric Clapton ===
- Riding with the King (Duck/Reprise, 2000)

=== With Rahsaan Roland Kirk ===
- The Case of the 3 Sided Dream in Audio Color (Atlantic, 1975)

=== With Earl Klugh ===
- Living inside Your Love (Blue Note, 1976)
- Finger Paintings (Blue Note, 1977)

=== With Gladys Knight & the Pips ===
- 2nd Anniversary (Buddah Records, 1975)
- Still Together (Buddah Records, 1977)
- The One and Only (Buddah Records, 1978)

=== With Davy Knowles & Back Door Slam ===
- Coming Up for Air (only on bonus track "Taste of Danger") (Blix Street Records, 2009)

=== With John Krondes and The Hit Making Team ===
- The End A New Beginning (Funky Sound of America, 2009)

=== With Ai Kuwabara ===
- Somehow, Someday, Somewhere (T.O.M. RECORDS, 2017)
- Live at the Blue Note (Verve, 2019)

=== With L'Image ===
- L'Image 2.0 (L'Image Records, 2009)

=== With Bill LaBounty ===
- Bill LaBounty (Warner Bros/Curb Records, 1982)

=== With Abraham Laboriel ===
- Dear Friends (Bluemoon Recordings, 1993)

=== With Nils Landgren ===
- The Moon the Stars and You (ACT, 2011)

=== With Neil Larsen ===
- High Gear (Horizon, A&M, 1979)

=== With Yusef Lateef ===
- In a Temple Garden (CTI, 1979)

=== With Yusef Lateef with Art Farmer ===
- Autophysiopsychic (CTI, 1977)

=== With Mike Lawrence ===
- Nightwind (Credited as Mike Lawrence with Herbie Hancock & Bob James) (Optimism Incorporated, 1987)

=== With Hubert Laws ===
- In the Beginning (The tracks on this album were additionally released separately as Then there was light Vol 1 and Vol 2) (CTI, 1974)
- The Chicago Theme (CTI, 1974)
- Romeo & Juliet (Columbia, 1976)

=== With Will Lee ===
- Oh! (Go Jazz, 1995)
- Love Gratitude and other Distractions (CD Baby/Sinning Saint, 2013)

=== With Levin Brothers ===
- Levin Brothers (Lazy Bones Recordings, 2014)

=== With O'Donel Levy ===
- Simba (Groove Merchant, 1974)

=== With Dave Liebman ===
- What It Is (Columbia, 1980)

=== With Didier Lockwood ===
- Storyboard (Dreyfus, 1996)

=== With Chuck Loeb ===
- Silhouette (track Lockdown) (Shanachie, 2013)

=== With Kenny Loggins ===
- Celebrate Me Home (Columbia, 1977)

=== With Gloria Loring ===
- Gloria Loring (Atlantic, 1986)

=== With Love Childs Afro Cuban Blues Band ===
- Spandisco (Midsong International, 1977)

=== With Jon Lucien ===
- Premonition (Precision, 1980)

=== With Elliot Lurie ===
- Elliot Lurie (Epic, 1975)

=== With Paul McCartney ===
- Tug of War (Parlaphone/EMI, 1982)
- Pipes of Peace (Parlophone UK, Columbia US, 1983)

=== With Van McCoy ===
- Disco Baby (credited to Van McCoy & the Soul City Symphony) (Avco, 1975)
- The Disco Kid (Buddah, 1975)
- The Real McCoy (H&L Records, 1976)
- Rhythms of the World (H&L, 1976)
- My Favorite Fantasy (MCA Records, 1978)

=== With Michael McDonald ===
- If Thats's What It Takes (Warner Bros, 1982)

=== With Ralph MacDonald ===
- The Path (Marlin, 1978)
- Counterpoint (Marlin, 1979)
- Universal Rhythm (Polydor, 1984)
- Surprize (Polydor, 1985)
- Port Pleasure (Videoarts Music, 1998)

=== With Teo Macero ===
- Impressions of Virus (Columbia, 1980)
- Virus (Original Soundtrack) (Columbia, 1980)
- Impressions of Miles Davis (Orchard, 2001)

=== With Kate & Anna McGarrigle ===
- Kate & Anna McGarrigle (Warner Bros, 1976)
- Dancer with Bruised Knees (Warner Bros, 1977)
- Pronto Monto (Warner Bros, 1978)
- French Record (Kébec-Disc/Hannibal, 1980)

=== With Colleen McNabb ===
- Don't Go To Strangers (Track 4 only) (Zucca Records, 2009)

=== With Bob Malach ===
- Mood Swing (GoJazz, 1990)

=== With Mike Mainieri ===
- Love Play (Arista, 1977)

=== With Melissa Manchester ===
- Singin' (Arista, 1977)

=== With Chuck Mangione ===
- Friends and Love (Mercury, 1970)
- Together: A New Chuck Mangione Concert (Mercury, 1971)
- Alive! (Mercury, 1972)
- Land of Make Believe (Mercury, 1973)
- Main Squeeze (A&M Records, 1976)
- Tarantella (A&M Records, 1980)
- 70 Miles Young (A&M Records, 1982)
- Disguise (Columbia, 1984)
- The Boys from Rochester (Feels So Good Records, 1989)
- Together Forever (Gates Music, 1994)
- The Hat's Back (Chuck Mangione, 1994)

=== With Gap Mangione ===
- Diana in the Autumn Wind (GRC, 1968)
- Sing Along Junk (Mercury, 1972)
- She and I (A&M, 1974)
- Gap Mangione! (A&M Records, 1976)
- Planet Gap (Josh Music Inc, 1998)
- Stolen Moments (Josh Music Inc, 2003)
- Family Holidays (Josh Music Inc, 2004)

=== With José Mangual ===
- Buyú (Turnstyle Records, 1977)

=== With The Manhattan Transfer ===
- Pastiche (Atlantic, 1978)
- Mecca for Moderns (Atlantic, 1981)

=== With Barry Manilow ===
- Barry Manilow (Bell, 1973)

=== With Herbie Mann ===
- First Light as The Family of Mann (Atlantic, 1974)
- Discothèque (Atlantic, 1975)
- Waterbed (Atlantic, 1975)
- Surprises (Atlantic, 1976)
- Gagaku & Beyond (Finnadar/Atlantic, 1974 [1976])
- Sunbelt (Atlantic, 1979)

=== With Manzanera & Mackay ===
- Crack the Whip (Relativity, 1988)
- Up In Smoke (Relativity, 1989)

=== With Steve Marcus ===
- Some Time Other Than Now (Flying Dutchman, 1976)

=== With Arif Mardin ===
- Journey (Atlantic, 1974)

=== With Tania Maria ===
- The Lady from Brazil (Manhattan Records, 1986)
- Forbidden Colors (Capitol Records, 1988)
- Bluesilian (TKM Records, 1996)
- Europe (New Note, 1997)
- Bela Vista (World Pacific Records, 1990)

=== With Mark-Almond ===
- Other Peoples Rooms (Horizon, 1978)

=== With Hirth Martinez ===
- Big Bright Street (Warner Bros, 1977)

=== With The Pedrito Martinez Group ===
- The Pedro Martinez Group (Motéma, 2013)

=== With Yoshiaki Masuo ===
- Sailing Wonder (Electric Bird, 1978)

=== With Sleepy Matsumoto with N.Y. First Calls ===
- Papillon (Compose, 1992)

=== With David Matthews ===
- Dune (CTI, 1977)
- Grand Cross (Electric Bird, 1981)
- American Pie (Credited to David Matthews Trio) (Sweet Basil, 1990)
- Without You (Credited to David Matthews & The Masters) (Absorb Music Japan, 2003)
- Sir, (Paddle Wheel, 2018)

=== With Lyle Mays ===
- Street Dreams (Geffen, 1988)

=== With Meco ===
- Star Wars and Other Galactic Funk (Millenium Records, 1977)

=== With Lesley Meguid ===
- The Truth About Love Songs (Muve Recordings, 2010)

=== With Sérgio Mendes ===
- Sérgio Mendes and the New Brazil '77 (Elektra, 1977)

=== With Bette Midler ===
- Bette Midler (Atlantic, 1973)
- Songs for the New Depression (Atlantic, 1976)

=== With Barry Miles ===
- Magic Theater (London, 1975)

=== With Adam Miller ===
- Westwind Circus (Chelsea Records, 1974)

=== With Charles Mingus ===
- Me, Myself An Eye

=== With Bob Mintzer ===
- Bop Boy (2002)

=== With Eddy Mitchell ===
- Le Cimetiére Des Eléphants (Barclay/RCA, 1982)

=== With Melba Moore ===
- Peach Melba (Buddah, 1975)
- This Is It (Buddah, 1976)
- Melba (1976 album) (Buddah, 1976)

=== With Russell Morris ===
- Turn It On (RCA Records, Wizard Records, 1976)

=== With Chris Mostert ===
- Midnight Breeze (Rhombus Records, 2004)

=== With Shigeharu Mukai ===
- Pleasure (Better Days, 1980)

=== With Teruo Nakamura ===
- Big Apple (credited to Teruo Nakamura Rising Sun Band) (Agharta, 1979)
- Super Friends (Eastworld, 1985)

=== With The New York Community Choir ===
- The New York Community Choir (RCA Victor, 1977)
- Make Every Day Count (RCA Victor, 1978)

=== With Nighthawks ===
- Metro Bar (Call It Anything, 2001)

=== With Claus Ogerman & Michael Brecker ===
- Cityscape (Warner Bros, 1982)

=== With Yoshiyuki Ohsawa ===
- Serious Barbarian (Track 3 only) (Epic, 1989)
- Serious Barbarian II (Track 8 only) (Epic, 1989)

=== With Mica Okudoi ===
- What a Difference (Leads Entertainment, 2009)

=== With Susan Osborn ===
- Signature (Orchard, 2000)

=== With Eddie Palmieri ===
- Unfinished Masterpiece (Coco, 1975)
- Exploration - Salsa-Descarga-Jazz (track "Resemblance") (Coco Records, 1978)

=== With Jackie Paris & Anne Marie Moss ===
- Live at the Maisonette (Differant Drummer Records, 1975)

=== With Luciano Pavarotti & Friends ===
- Pavarotti & Friends for the Children of Liberia (Decca, 1998)
- Pavarotti & Friends for Cambodia and Tibet (Decca, 2000)

=== With Peter, Paul and Mary ===
- Reunion (Warner Bros, 1978)

=== With Michel Petrucciani ===
- Both Worlds (Dreyfus, 1997)
- Trio in Tokyo (Dreyfus, 1999)
- Both Worlds Live - North Sea Jazz Festival (Dreyfus, 2016)
- The Montreux Years (BMG, 2023)

=== With Esther Phillips ===
- Performance (Kudu/CTI, 1974)
- Capricorn Princess (Kudu/CTI, 1976)

=== With Noel Pointer ===
- Phantazia (Blue Note, 1977)
- Hold On (United Artists Records, 1978)

=== With Mike Porcaro ===
- Brotherly Love (Creatchy Records, 2011) (Tracks "Rosanna", "Manic Depression", "Georgy Porgy", "Lowdown", "E Minor Shuffle", "Human Nature", "Africa", "Let's Stay Together", "Stuffy", "Jeff's Strut" and "Corbitt Van Brauer")

=== With Andy Pratt ===
- Resolution (Nemporer, 1976)

=== With Rainbow Featuring Will Boulware ===
- Crystal Green (Inner City Records, 1978)
- Over Crystal Green (credited to Will & Rainbow) (Eighty-Eight's, 2002)
- Harmony (credited to Will & Rainbow) (Eighty-Eight's, 2003)

=== With Bonnie Raitt ===
- Streetlights (Warner Bros, 1974)

=== With Elliott Randall ===
- Elliott Randall's New York (Kirshner, 1977)

=== With Pat Rebillot ===
- Free Fall (Atlantic, 1974)

=== With Leon Redbone ===
- On the Track (Warner Bros, 1975)

=== With Buddy Rich Big Band ===
- Burning for Buddy: A Tribute to the Music of Buddy Rich (Atlantic, 1994)
- Burning for Buddy A Tribute to the Music of Buddy Rich Volume II (Atlantic, 1997)

=== With Jeff Richman ===
- Big Wheel (Nefer Records, 2013)

=== With Lee Ritenour ===
- Friendship (Jasrac, 1978)
- The Captain's Journey (Elektra, 1978)
- Feel the Night (Elektra, 1979)
- Wes Bound (appears on bonus track N.Y.Time - track 11) (GRP, 1993)

=== With Diana Ross ===
- Eaten Alive (RCA, 1985)
- Red Hot Rhythm & Blues (EMI UK, RCA US, 1987)

=== With Professor RJ Ross ===
- Face to Face (Latana Records/Media Force Music Group, 2008)

=== With Michael Ruff ===
- Once In A Lifetime (Warner Bros, 1984)
- You Are My Song (Ruff Mix Music, 2012)

=== With David Ruffin ===
- Who I Am (Motown, 1975)
- Everything's Coming Up Love (Motown, 1976)
- In My Stride (Motown, 1977)

=== With Bridget St John ===
- Take the 5ifth (The Road Goes on Forever, 1996)

=== With William Salter ===
- It Is So Beautiful To Be (Marlin, RCA, 1977)

=== With Sergio Salvatore ===
- Point of Presence (N2K Encoded Music, 1997)

=== With Joe Sample ===
- The Hunter (MCA, 1983)
- Did You Feel That? (Warner Bros, 1994)
- Sample This (Warner Bros, 1997)
- "No regrets" (PRA, 2009)
- "Children of the Sun" (and the NDR Big Band) (PRA, 2014)

=== With David Sanborn ===
- Taking Off (Warner Bros, 1975)
- Heart to Heart (Warner Bros, 1978)
- Hideaway (Warner Bros, 1980)
- Voyeur (Warner Bros, 1981)
- Backstreet (Warner Bros, 1983)
- Taking Off (Warner Bros, 1985)
- A Change of Heart (Warner Bros, 1987)
- Pearls (Elektra, 1995)
- Time Again (Verve, 2003)
- Closer (Verve Records, 2004)
- Here and Gone (Decca, 2008)
- Only Everything (Decca, 2010)

=== With Ida Sand ===
- The Gospel Truth (ACT, 2011)

=== With Mongo Santamaría ===
- Red Hot (Zappan Tee Records/Columbia, 1979)

=== With Philippe Sarde ===
- Hors-La-Loi (Soundtrack from the film by Robin Davis) (Carrere, 1985)

=== With Masahiko Satoh ===
- As If... (Nippon/Columbia, 1985)
- Amorphism (Portrait, 1986)
- Double Exposure (Epic/Sony Atuh, 1988)

=== With Leo Sayer ===
- Endless Flight (Chrysalis UK, Warner Bros US, 1976)

=== With Lalo Schifrin ===
- Towering Toccata (CTI, 1976)

=== With Diane Schuur ===
- Talkin' 'bout You (GRP, 1988)

=== With Tom Scott ===
- New York Connection (Ode, 1975)
- Blow It Out (Ode, 1977)
- Intimate Strangers (Columbia, 1978)
- Apple Juice (CBS, 1981)
- Bluestreak (Credited to Tom Scott and the L.A. Express) (GRP, 1996)
- Canon Re-loaded (Concord Jazz, 2008)

=== With John Sebastian ===
- Tar Beach (Shanachie, 1993)

=== With Don Sebesky ===
- The Rape of El Morro (CTI, 1975)

=== With Daniel Seff ===
- Vol De Nuit (Track "Bill" only) (CBS, 1984)

=== With Paul Shaffer ===
- Coast to Coast (Track "One Cup of Coffee") (Capitol Records, 1989)

=== With Howard Shore ===
- The Last Mimzy (Original motion picture soundtrack) (New Line Records, 2007)

=== With Ben Sidran ===
- The Cat and the Hat (Horizon, 1979)

=== With Janis Siegel ===
- Experiment in White (Atlantic, 1982)

=== With Carly Simon ===
- Boys in the Trees (Elektra, 1978)
- Spy (Elektra, 1979)
- Come Upstairs (Warner Bros, 1980)
- My Romance (Arista, 1990)
- Have You Seen Me Lately (Arista, 1990)
- The Bedroom Tapes (Arista, 2000)
- This Kind of Love (Track "Sangre Dolce") (Hear Music, 2008)

=== With Harper Simon ===
- Harper Simon (Tulsi Records/Vagrant, 2009)

=== With Lucy Simon ===
- Lucy Simon (RCA Victor, 1975)
- Stolen Time (RCA, 1977)

=== With Simon and Garfunkel ===
- The Concert in Central Park (Warner Bros, 1982)

=== With Paul Simon ===
- Still Crazy After All These Years (track "50 Ways to Leave Your Lover") (Columbia, 1975)
- One-Trick Pony (Warner Bros, 1980)
- Hearts and Bones (Warner Bros, 1983)
- Graceland (Warner Bros, 1986)
- The Rhythm Of The Saints (Warner Bros, 1990)
- You're the One (Warner Bros, 2000)
- Paul Simon's Concert in the Park, August 15, 1991 (Warner Bros, 1991)
- Surprise (Warner Bros, 2006)
- In the Blue Light (Legacy, 2018)

=== With Frank Sinatra ===
- L.A. Is My Lady (Qwest, Warner Bros, 1984)

=== With SMAP ===
- 008 Tacomax (Victor, 1996)

=== With Smappies ===
- Smappies II (Victor, 1999)

=== With Lonnie Smith ===
- Funk Reaction (Lester Radio Corporation, 1977)

=== With Andy Snitzer ===
- Ties That Bind (Reprise, 1994)

=== With Phoebe Snow ===
- Second Childhood (Columbia, 1976)
- Never Letting Go (Columbia, 1977)

=== With Christoph Spendel ===
- Spendel (L+R Records, 1989)

=== With Spyro Gyra ===
- Incognito (MCA, 1982)
- City Kids (MCA, 1983)

=== With Stardrive ===
- Intergalactic Trot (Elektra, 1973)

=== With Ringo Starr ===
- Ringo the 4th (Atlantic US, Polydor UK, 1977)

=== With Steely Dan ===
- Aja (on "Aja") (ABC, 1977)
- Gaucho (on "Glamour Profession", "My Rival", "Third World Man", and percussion on "Hey Nineteen") (MCA, 1980)

=== With Jeremy Steig ===
- Firefly (CTI, 1977)
- Rain Forest with Eddie Gómez (CMP, 1980)

=== With Steps Ahead ===
- Step by Step (Better Days, 1981)
- Smokin' in the Pit (Better Days, 1981)

=== With Joss Stone ===
- Colour Me Free! (EMI, 2009)

=== With Street Corner Symphony ===
- Harmony Grits (Bang Records, 1975)

=== With Barbra Streisand ===
- Guilty (Columbia, 1980)

=== Mika Stoltzman ===
- Memories of Tomorrow (Big Round Records, 2075)

=== With Stuff ===
- Stuff (Warner Bros, 1976)
- More Stuff (Warner Bros, 1977)
- Stuff It (Warner Bros, 1978)
- Live Stuff (Warner Bros, 1978)
- Live in New York (Warner Bros, 1980)
- Made in America (A remembrance of Richard Tee) (Bridge Gate, 1994))
- Live At Montreux 1976 (Eagle Records, 2008)

=== With Sunlightsquare ===
- Urban Sessions (Sunlightsquare Records, 2006)

=== With Yoshio Suzuki ===
- The Moment (Videoarts Music, 1992)

=== With The Sylvers ===
- New Horizons (Capitol, 1977)
- Forever Yours (Casablanca, 1978)

=== With Grady Tate ===
- Master Grady Tate (ABC Impulse!, 1977)

=== With James Taylor ===
- New Moon Shine (Columbia, 1991), on "Everybody Loves To Cha-Cha"
- October Road (Columbia, 2002)
- James Taylor at Christmas (Columbia, 2006)
- Covers (Hear Music, 2008)
- Other Covers (Hear Music, 2009)
- Before This World (Concord, 2015)
- American Standard (Fantasy, 2020)

=== With Kate Taylor ===
- Kate Taylor (CBS, 1978)

=== With Livingston Taylor ===
- There You Are Again (Chesky Record/Whistling Dog Music, 2006)
- Last Alaska Moon (Chesky, 2010)

=== With Richard Tee ===
- Strokin (Tappan Zee/Columbia, 1979)
- Natural Ingredients (Tappan Zee/CBS, 1980)
- The Bottom Line (Electric Bird)
- Inside You (Epic/Sony, 1989)
- Real Time (One Voice, 1995)
- Real Time Live in Concert 1992 (Videoarts Music, 2012)

=== With Joe Thomas ===
- Masada (Groove Merchant, 1975)
- Feelin's from Within (Groove Merchant, 1976)

=== With Tonto ===
- It's About Time (Polydor, 1974)

=== With Carol Townes and Fifth Avenue ===
- Carol Townes and Fifth Avenue (Sixth Avenue, 1976)

=== With Mary Travers ===
- It's in Everyone Of Us (Chrysalis, 1978)

=== With John Tropea ===
- Tropea (Marlin, 1975)
- Short Trip to Space (Marlin, 1977)
- To Touch You Again (Marlin, 1979)
- NY Cats Direct (DMP, 1986)
- Live at Mikell's New York (Videoarts Music, 1994)
- Something Old New Borrowed And Blue (Videoarts Music, 1999)
- A Simple Way To Say I Love You (Digital Dimension, 1999)
- Standard Influence (Videoarts Music, 2003)
- Rock Candy - Standard Influence II (Videoarts Music, 2006)
- Take Me Back To The Ol' School (CD Baby, 2007)
- Tropea 10 The Time is Right (Video Arts, 2007)
- Gotcha Rhythm Right Here (on Track "Hip to the Hips") (Savoy Records, 2014)

=== With Jeff Tyzik ===
- Radiance (Capitol Records, 1982)
- The Farthest Corner of My Mind (Amherst Records, 1986)

=== With Phil Upchurch ===
- Phil Upchurch (Marlin/TK Records, 1978)

=== With Phil Upchurch & Tennyson Stephens ===
- Upchurch/Tennyson (Kudu, 1975)

=== With Michal Urbaniak ===
- Fusion III (CBS/Columbia, 1975)

=== With Dave Valentin ===
- Legends (GRP, 1979)

=== With Gus Vali ===
- Chimera (Peters International, 1974)

=== With Frankie Valli ===
- Lady Put the Light Out (Private Stock, 1977)

=== With Kenny Vance ===
- Vance 32 (Atlantic, 1975)

=== With Ornella Vanoni ===
- Ornella &... (CGD, 1986)

=== With Various Artists ===
- The Wiz (soundtrack) (MCA, 1978)
- Music from the motion picture Lethal Weapon 3 (Track 1 only) (Reprise, 1992)
- The Bridge School Concerts Vol 1 (Warner Bros/Reprise, 1997)
- Celebrating the Music of Weather Report (Track 6 only) (Telarc, 2000)
- The Wild Thornberrys Movie Soundtrack (Jive/BMG Sony Music, 2002)
- Cannon Re*Loaded (All-Star Celebration of Cannonball Adderley) (Concord Jazz, 2008)

=== With Harold Vick ===
- After the Dance (Wolf Records, 1977)

=== With John Wackerman ===
- Drum Duets Vol. 1 (On track 1 only "Manic Depression") (Eyeperian, 2007)

=== With Randy Waldman ===
- SuperHeros (BFM Jazz, 2018)

=== With Cedar Walton ===
- Mobius (RCA, 1975)

=== With Dionne Warwick ===
- Friends in Love (Arista, 1982)
- Heartbreaker (Arista, 1982)

=== With Grover Washington, Jr. ===
- Feels So Good (Kudu, 1975)
- Winelight (Elektra/Asylum, 1980)
- Come Morning (Elektra/Asylum, 1980)
- Inside Moves (Elektra, 1984)
- A House Full of Love (Columbia, 1986)
- Soulful Strut (Columbia, 1996)

=== With Sadao Watanabe ===
- Morning Island (Flying Disk, ProJazz, 1979)
- How's Everything (Columbia, 1980)
- Fill up the Night (Elektra, 1983)
- Rendezvous (Elektra, 1984)
- Earth Step (Verve Forecast, 1994)
- Sadao 2019 Live At Blue Note Tokyo (JVC, 2019)

=== With Bill Watrous ===
- Bone Straight Ahead (Credited as Bill Watrous Combo with Danny Stiles) (Famous Door, 1973)

=== With Weather Report ===
- Mr. Gone (Columbia, 1978) (Tracks "Young and Fine" and "And Then")

=== With The Webb Sisters ===
- Daylight Crossing (Mercury, 2006)

=== With Frank Weber ===
- As The Time Flies (RCA Victor, 1978)

=== With Dave Weckl ===
- Master Plan (On track 8 only - Master Plan) (GRP, 1990)

=== With Fred Wesley & the J.B.'s ===
- The Lost Album (Hip-O Select, 2011)

=== With White Elephant ===
- White Elephant (Just Sunshine Records, 1972)

=== With Whitren & Cartwright ===
- Rhythm Hymn (Elektra, 1983)

=== With David Wilcox ===
- Big Horizon (A&M Records, 1994)

=== With Patrick Williams New York Band ===
- 10th Avenue (Soundwings, 1987)

=== With Nancy Wilson ===
- This Mother's Daughter (Capitol, 1976)
- Nancy Now! (Columbia, 1988)

=== With Paul Winter ===
- Common Ground (A&M, 1978)
- Concert for the Earth (credited as Paul Winter Consort) (Living Music, 1985)
- Whales Alive (credited as Paul Winter & Paul Halley) (Track 8 - Ocean Dream) (Living Music, 1987)

=== With Philippé Wynne ===
- Starting All Over (Cotillion, 1977)

=== With Akiko Yano ===
- Home on the Range (uncertain translation of Japanese title!) (Midi Inc, 1986)

=== With Yutaka Yokokura ===
- Love Light (Alfa, 1978)

=== With Zawose & Brook ===
- Assembly (Narada, 2001)

=== With Ratko Zjaca ===
- Continental Talk (In+Out Records, 2009)
