= I Am My Brother's Keeper =

Studio album by The Ruffin Brothers: Jimmy Ruffin & David Ruffin
- Released: October 1970
- Recorded: Golden World, Detroit 1970
- Genre: Soul, R&B
- Length: 47:05
- Label: Soul (Motown)
- Producer: Henry Cosby, Frank Wilson, Bobby Taylor, Al Kent

Jimmy Ruffin chronology
The Groove Governor (1970)	I Am My Brother's Keeper (1970)	Jimmy Ruffin ... Forever (1973)

David Ruffin chronology
Feelin' Good (1969)	I Am My Brother's Keeper (1970)	David (1971)

Professional ratings
Review scores
Source	Rating
Allmusic	3.5/5 stars
Christgau's Record Guide	B

I Am My Brother's Keeper is a 1970 album by Motown vocalists and siblings Jimmy Ruffin and David Ruffin, credited as "The Ruffin Brothers". The album includes the singles "Stand by Me" and "When My Love Hand Comes Down".

The album was belatedly reissued on CD in 2010 by Hip-O Select, along with additional bonus tracks.

== Track listing ==
Side one
No.	Title	Writer(s)	Length
1.	"He Ain't Heavy, He's My Brother"	Bob Russell, Bobby Scott	3:45
2.	"Stand by Me"	Ben E. King, Elmo Glick	3:15
3.	"When My Love Hand Comes Down"	Leon Ware, Pam Sawyer	2:50
4.	"Got To See If I Can't Get Mommy (To Come Back Home)"	Helen Miller, Rose Marie McCoy	2:44
5.	"Your Love Was Worth Waiting For"	Leon Ware, Pam Sawyer	2:51
6.	"Steppin' on a Dream"	Henry Cosby, James Dean, Joe Hinton	2:27

Side two
No.	Title	Writer(s)	Length
1.	"Didn't I (Blow Your Mind This Time)"	Thom Bell, William Hart	2:56
2.	"True Love Can Be Beautiful"	Bobby Taylor, Jeana Jackson, Leonard Caston, Jr.	3:10
3.	"Turn Back the Hands of Time"	Bonnie Thompson, Jack Daniels	2:57
4.	"Set 'Em Up (Move In for the Thrill)"	Albert Hamilton, Norma Toney, William Garrett	2:59
5.	"The Things We Have to Do"	Duke Browner	3:05
6.	"Lo and Behold"	James Taylor	3:20

Previously unreleased bonus tracks, 2010 Hip-O reissue
No.	Title	Writer(s)	Length
1.	"You're What I Need (Not What I Want)"	Gloria Jones, Pam Sawyer
2.	"Stand By Me (Brothers Mix)" (undubbed version)	Ben E. King, Jerry Leiber, Mike Stoller	‘

== Chart history ==
Chart (1969)	Peak position
U.S. Billboard Top LPs	178
U.S. Billboard Top R&B Albums	15

== Personnel ==
- Lead vocals by Jimmy and David Ruffin
- Background vocals by The Originals and The Andantes
- Instrumentation by The Funk Brothers
- David Van DePitte, Henry Cosby, Paul Riser, Robert White, Tom Baird, Wade Marcus, Willie Shorter - arrangements
