= Walk Away from Love =

Single by David Ruffin

from the album Who I Am
- B-side: "Love Can Be Hazardous To Your Health"
- Released: November 1975
- Recorded: 1975
- Genre: R&B, Soul
- Length: 3:16 (single version); 5:29 (album version)
- Label: Motown
- Songwriter: Charles Kipps
- Producer: Van McCoy

David Ruffin singles chronology
"Superstar (Remember How You Got Where You Are)" (1975)	"Walk Away from Love" (1975)	"Heavy Love" (1976)

"Walk Away from Love" is a song recorded by American singer David Ruffin in 1975. The million-selling single, produced by Van McCoy and written by Charles Kipps, was number one on the US R&B Singles Chart for one week in early 1976, and crossed over to #9 on the Pop Charts. In Canada, the song peaked at #30.

"Walk Away from Love" was Ruffin's only number-one R&B hit, and only one of two Top 10 pop hits for Ruffin on the Billboard Hot 100, the other being "My Whole World Ended (The Moment You Left Me)", which also peaked at #9. The song was his only solo entry into the UK charts, where it was a top ten hit as well, and peaked at #10 in early 1976. The backing vocals were performed by the disco group Faith, Hope & Charity.

== See also ==
- List of Hot Soul Singles number ones of 1976
