= Who I Am (David Ruffin album) =

Studio album by David Ruffin
- Released: October 1975
- Recorded: Mediasound, New York City
- Genres: Soul, R&B
- Length: 40:15
- Label: Motown
- Producer: Van McCoy

David Ruffin chronology
Me 'n Rock 'n Roll Are Here to Stay (1974)	Who I Am (1975)	Everything's Coming Up Love (1976)

Singles from Who I Am
- 1. "Walk Away from Love" Released: October 1975; 2. "Heavy Love" Released: February 1976

Professional ratings
Review scores
Source	Rating
Allmusic	3.5/5 stars

Who I Am is a 1975 album from the former Temptations singer, David Ruffin. Recorded by Van McCoy who produced and arranged the album at Mediasound Studios in New York City. The album provided Ruffin with the biggest hit of his solo career, "Walk Away From Love".

== Track listing ==
1. "Who I Am" (Charles H. Kipps, Jr.)
2. "It Takes All Kinds of People" (Joe Cobb, Van McCoy)
3. "Walk Away from Love" (Charles H. Kipps, Jr.)
4. "I've Got Nothing But Time" (Van McCoy)
5. "The Finger Pointers" (Joe Cobb, Van McCoy)
6. "Wild Honey" (Joe Cobb, Van McCoy)
7. "Heavy Love" (Joe Cobb, Van McCoy)
8. "Statue of a Fool" (the songwriter is credited as David Ruffin on his album, but other albums have credited Jan Crutchfield as songwriter)
9. "Love Can Be Hazardous to Your Health" (Jesse Boyce)

According to Genna Sapia-Ruffin, common-law wife of David Ruffin, former member of The Temptations, on page 251 of her book A Memoir: David Ruffin—My Temptation (1993-2003, 1st Books Library), Ruffin wrote and originally released the song, "Statue of a Fool", on a 78 RPM in 1958, when he was recording under the name "Little Eddie Bush.' However, as he was only seventeen years old at that time, later covers of the song gave writing credits to Jan Crutchfield. (David himself has stated that he wrote it, in several live appearances with fellow ex-Temptation Eddie Kendrick and/or Dennis Edwards. There is also a YouTube video in which he states this just before he goes into the song.)

== Personnel ==
- David Ruffin - vocals
- Eric Gale, Hugh McCracken, John Tropea - guitar
- Gordon Edwards - bass
- Paul Griffin, Richard Tee, Van McCoy - keyboards
- Ken Bichel - synthesizer
- Steve Gadd - drums
- Arthur Jenkins, David Carey, George Devens - percussion
- Albert Bailey, Brenda Hilliard, Diane Destry - background vocals
- Bernie Glow, Marvin Stamm, Mel Davis, Mickey Gravine, Paul Faulise, Bob Alexander, Sonny Russo, Urban Green - horns
- Al Brown, Cathy Keinke, Manny Vardi, Gene Orloff, Guy Lumia, Harry Lookofsky, Jesse Levy, Joe Malin, Julian Barber, Julie Schachter, Kermit Moore, Max Pollikoff, Richard Sortomme, Selwart Clarke - strings
- Van McCoy - arrangements, conductor
- Norman Seeff - photography

== Chart history ==
Chart (1975)	Peak position
U.S. Billboard 200	31
U.S. Billboard R&B Albums	5

=== Singles ===
Year	Single	Chart positions	
Year	Single	US	US R&B
1975	"Walk Away from Love"	9	1
1976	"Heavy Love"	47	8
"—" denotes releases that did not chart
