= Me 'n Rock 'n Roll Are Here to Stay =

Studio album by David Ruffin
- Released: December 1974
- Recorded: 1973–1974
- Studios: Motown Recording Studios, Hollywood
- Genres: Soul, R&B
- Length: 32:33
- Label: Motown
- Producers: Norman Whitfield, Mark Davis

David Ruffin chronology
David Ruffin (1973)	Me 'n Rock 'n Roll Are Here to Stay (1974)	Who I Am (1975)

Singles from Me 'n Rock 'n Roll Are Here to Stay
- 1. "Me And Rock 'N' Roll (Are Here to Stay)" Released: October 10, 1974; 2. "Superstar (Remember How You Got Where You Are)" Released: January 31, 1975

Professional ratings
Review scores
Source	Rating
Allmusic	3.5/5 stars

Me 'n Rock 'n Roll Are Here to Stay is a 1974 album by ex-The Temptations singer David Ruffin. On this album, the singer was given another opportunity to prove himself, as the former Temptations frontman was reunited with Norman Whitfield—an "A-list" producer who recorded a number of classics with the Temptations.

== Track listing ==
Side One

1. "I Saw You When You Met Her" (Norman Whitfield)
2. "Take Me Clear From Here" (Vincent DiMirco)
3. "Smiling Faces Sometimes" (Whitfield, Barrett Strong)
4. "Me 'n Rock 'n Roll Are Here to Stay" (Whitfield)

Side Two

1. "Superstar (Remember How You Got Where You Are)" (Whitfield, Strong)
2. "No Matter Where" (Clarence Drayton, Tamy Smith)
3. "City Stars" (Charles Higgins Jr, Dobie Gray)
4. "I Just Want to Celebrate" (Dino Fekaris, Nick Zesses)

== Personnel ==
- David Ruffin - vocals
- Dennis Coffey, Eddie Willis, Johnny McGhee, Melvin Ragin - guitar
- Henry Davis, Ron Brown - bass
- Earl Van Dyke, Mark Davis - keyboards
- Aaron Smith, Ed Greene, James Gadson - drums
- Eddie "Bongo" Brown, Stephanie Spruill - percussion
- Mykal Moore - saxophone
- Freddy Dunn, Kenny Copeland - trumpet
- Carolyn Willis, Jessie Kirkland, Joe Greene, Julia Waters, Lisa Roberts, Luther Waters, Maxine Waters, Oren Waters - background vocals
- Normal Whitfield - production (except "No Matter Where")
- Mark Davis - production ("No Matter Where")

== Chart history ==
Chart	Peak position
U.S. Billboard R&B Albums	37

=== Singles ===
Year	Single	Chart positions	
Year	Single	US	US R&B
1974	"Me and Rock & Roll"	—	52
1975	"Superstar (Remember How You Got Where You Are)"	—	—
"—" denotes releases that did not chart
