= David Ruffin (album) =

Studio album by David Ruffin
- Released: February 1973
- Recorded: 1972–1973
- Studio: The Sound Suite, Detroit
- Genre: Soul, R&B
- Length: 34:40
- Label: Motown
- Producer: Robert E. Miller

David Ruffin chronology
David (1971)	David Ruffin (1973)	Me 'N Rock 'N Roll Are Here to Stay (1974)

Singles from David Ruffin
- 1. "A Little More Trust" Released: June 8, 1972; 2. "Blood Donors Needed (Give All You Can)" Released: February 27, 1973; 3. "Common Man" Released: July 31, 1973

Professional ratings
Review scores
Source	Rating
AllMusic	3.5/5 stars

David Ruffin is an album from singer David Ruffin. Coming out after Motown refused to put out his proposed third album in 1971 (released as David in 2004), Ruffin was likewise no longer afforded access to "A-list" material and support musicians. This album in many ways was a collaborative effort with Robert E. Miller, who produced the album. Miller also had a hand in composing eight of its tracks. Although the album made it into the US R&B Top Five, it underperformed on the US pop charts, peaking at number 168. Those slipping figures were indicators of the increasing lack of interest from Motown in Ruffin's career.

The songs were arranged by David Van DePitte, with the Andantes singing backing vocals.

== Track listing ==
All tracks composed by Robert Eugene Miller; except where indicated

Side one

1. "The Rovin' Kind"
2. "Common Man"
3. "I'm Just a Mortal Man"
4. "(If Loving You Is Wrong) I Don't Want to Be Right" (Homer Banks, Carl Hampton, Raymond Jackson)
5. "There Will Always Be Another Song to Sing"

Side two

1. "I Miss You (Part 1)" (Kenny Gamble, Leon Huff)
2. "Blood Donors Needed (Give All You Can)"
3. "A Little More Trust"
4. "Go On with Your Bad Self"
5. "A Day in the Life of a Working Man" (Robert Miller, David Ruffin)

== Personnel ==
- David Ruffin - vocals
- The Andantes - backing vocals
- Eddie Kendricks - backing vocals on "I Miss You"
- David Van De Pitte - arrangements

Technical

- John Lewis - recording engineer
- Michael Grace - special technical assistance
- Jim Britt - photography

== Chart history ==
Chart (1973)	Peak position
U.S. Billboard 200	160
U.S. Billboard R&B Albums	34

=== Singles ===
Year	Single	Chart positions		
Year	Single	US	US R&B	
1972	"Little More Trust"	—	—	
1973	"Blood Donor Needed (Give All You Can)"	—	80	
1973	"Common Man"	—	84	"—" denotes releases that did not chart
