= My Whole World Ended (The Moment You Left Me) =

Single by David Ruffin

from the album My Whole World Ended
- B-side: "I've Got to Find Myself a Brand New Baby"
- Released: January 20, 1969
- Recorded: Hitsville USA (Studio A); 1968
- Genre: Soul
- Length: 3:30
- Label: Motown; M 1140
- Songwriters: Harvey Fuqua; Johnny Bristol; Pam Sawyer; James Roach
- Producers: Harvey Fuqua; Johnny Bristol

David Ruffin singles chronology
"My Whole World Ended (The Moment You Left Me)" (1969)	"I've Lost Everything I've Ever Loved" (1969)

"My Whole World Ended (The Moment You Left Me)" is the solo debut single for former Temptations lead singer David Ruffin, released on Motown Records in early 1969 (see 1969 in music). The song was written by Harvey Fuqua, Johnny Bristol, Pam Sawyer, and James Roach. Fuqua and Bristol handled the recording's production.

== Background ==
Ruffin had been dismissed from the Temptations in June 1968 for what has been repeatedly deemed increasingly unprofessional behavior. The song was originally intended to be sung by the Temptations when Ruffin was still the group's front man. David Ruffin had always been signed as a single artist which was part of the issue with the group who had a collective contract. Once he left, the song was given to him.

The song, with its melody and intro based upon the classical music piece "Frühlingslied" by Felix Mendelssohn, is a bittersweet ballad in the style of "Since I Lost My Baby", "All I Need", "I Could Never Love Another (After Loving You)", "(Loneliness Made Me Realize) It's You That I Need", "(I Know) I'm Losing You" and "I Wish It Would Rain", Ruffin, as the narrator, sings of the extensive pain he has felt since his lover has left him. All throughout the song, Ruffin asks his lover why she left him, what he did wrong that drove her away, and professes to her that without her, his life is meaningless. Singing backup for Ruffin on the recording are The Originals, who the same year would score a hit of their own with "Baby I'm For Real". As to the distinct piccolo flute on the recording, Dayna Hartwick stated

== Chart performance ==
"My Whole World Ended (The Moment You Left Me)" was the focal point of Ruffin's debut solo LP, My Whole World Ended. It peaked at number nine on the Billboard Hot 100 and number two on the Billboard R&B Singles chart. Only one more of Ruffin's solo singles, 1975's "Walk Away from Love", would match its success.

== Personnel ==
- Lead vocals by David Ruffin
- Background vocals by The Originals: Freddie Gorman, Walter Gaines, Hank Dixon, C.P. Spencer
- Instrumentation by The Funk Brothers
- Piccolo flute by Dayna Hartwick

== Cover versions ==
- The song was covered by The Chi-Lites on their 1969 debut album Give It Away.
- The Spinners covered it on their 1970 second album 2nd Time Around.
- Kiki Dee also recorded the track for her 1970 Motown album Great Expectations.

== Samples ==
- In June 2014, the song was prominently sampled in the EDM song "Bullit," recorded by French music producer Laurent Arriau a.k.a. Watermät. The song charted in Belgium and hit No. 15 on the UK's official singles chart as a summer party song.
