= Everything's Coming Up Love =

Studio album by David Ruffin
- Released: May 1976
- Genres: Soul, R&B
- Label: Motown
- Producer: Van McCoy

David Ruffin chronology
Who I Am (1975)	Everything's Coming Up Love (1976)	In My Stride (1977)

Singles from Everything's Coming Up Love
- 1. "Everything's Coming Up Love" Released: May 1976; 2. "On And Off" Released: September 1976

Professional ratings
Review scores
Source	Rating
Allmusic	3.5/5 stars

Everything's Coming Up Love is a 1976 album from then-former Temptations singer David Ruffin.

== Track listing ==
All tracks composed by Van McCoy; except where indicated

1. "Discover Me"
2. "First Round Knock-Out"
3. "Good Good Times" (Charles H. Kipps, Jr.)
4. "On and Off"
5. "Ready, Willing And Able"
6. "Everything's Coming Up Love"
7. "Let's Get Into Something"
8. "Until We Said Goodbye" (Charles H. Kipps, Jr.)

== Personnel ==
- Eric Gale, Hugh McCracken - guitar
- Gordon Edwards - bass
- Van McCoy - acoustic piano, arrangements, background vocals, conductor
- Leon Pendarvis, Richard Tee - electric piano, clavinet
- "Bad" Steve Gadd - drums
- Ralph MacDonald - congas, tambourine
- Albert Bailey, Brenda Hilliard, Diane Destry - background vocals
- Bernie Glow, Buddy Morrow, Dominick Gravine, George Devens, Jon Faddis, Melvyn Davis, Mervin Gold, Paul Faulise, Robert Alexander - horns
- Aaron Rosand, Alfred Brown, Beverly Lauridsen, Emanuel Green, Gene Orloff, George Marge, Guy Lumia, Harold Kohon, Harry Lookofsky, Jesse Levey, Joseph Malignaggi, Mitsue Takayama, Selwart Clarke, Theodore Isreal, Yoko Matsuo - strings

== Chart history ==
Chart (1976)	Peak position
U.S. Billboard 200	51
U.S. Billboard R&B Albums	16

=== Singles ===
Year	Single	Chart positions	
Year	Single	US	US R&B
1976	"Everthing's Coming Up Love"	49	8
1976	"On and Off"	—	48
"—" denotes releases that did not chart
