= Superstar (Remember How You Got Where You Are) =

Single by The Temptations

from the album Solid Rock
- B-side: "Gonna Keep on Tryin' Till I Win Your Love"
- Released: October 17, 1971
- Recorded: Hitsville USA (Studio A); September 11, September 15, September 18, and September 21, 1971
- Genre: Psychedelic soul, Funk
- Length: 2:52
- Label: Gordy; G 7111
- Songwriters: Norman Whitfield; Barrett Strong
- Producer: Norman Whitfield

The Temptations singles chronology
"It's Summer" (1971)	"Superstar (Remember How You Got Where You Are)" (1971)	"Take a Look Around" (1972)

"Superstar (Remember How You Got Where You Are)" is a 1971 hit single for the Gordy (Motown) label, recorded by The Temptations and produced by Norman Whitfield. Something of an early ancestor to the "diss songs" prevalent in hip hop music towards the end of the 20th century, "Superstar" is an attack at two former Temptations members, David Ruffin (who had been fired back in 1968) and Eddie Kendricks (who quit the act in early 1971 and negotiated a Motown solo deal). The song appears on the 1972 album Solid Rock.

== Song information ==
Kendricks quit the group amidst conflicts and tension between him and his bandmates, Otis Williams and Melvin Franklin, and after being denied the opportunity to record a solo album of classic-styled soul as a reprieve from Norman Whitfield's psychedelic soul recordings, which he detested.

Kendricks had continued his friendship with Ruffin following his firing in 1968, and by mid-1971 was making public statements blaming his departure on his problems with Otis Williams and Melvin Franklin. Kendricks pointed out the failure of "It's Summer", the first single not to feature Kendricks' vocals, as evidence that the group was faltering without him, and Ruffin told the press that he was considering starting a new singing group with Kendricks, then-current Temptations lead singer Dennis Edwards, and, once his health improved, Kendricks' good friend Paul Williams (another founding member of the Temptations who was forced to quit the group in 1971 because of failing health).

Ruffin and Kendricks' statements did not please the rest of the group or Whitfield. The song "Superstar (Remember How You Got Where You Are)" had begun its life as a song Whitfield and lyricist Barrett Strong were writing about one of Whitfield's former friends, a producer whom Whitfield thought had become too standoffish after achieving success. By the time the song was completed and being recorded by the Temptations, however, Otis Williams had had it reworked so that it was "about David [Ruffin] and Eddie [Kendricks]"

The recorded version of the song features Dennis Edwards, Melvin Franklin, and new Temptations Damon Harris (Kendricks' replacement, making his Temptations debut here) and Richard Street (who replaced Paul Williams) trading lines that constituted a friendly warning to their former colleagues:

Don't change your style now that you've reached the top
Don't choose your friends by what they've got
Remember, beneath the glitter and gleam
Like everyday people, you're just a human being

The song goes on to ask the "superstars" (who are never named in the song) "do you know who your real friends are?" and to "remember how you got where you are." The Funk Brothers, Motown's in-house studio band, backed "Superstar" with a funk instrumental track highlighted by Earl Van Dyke's piano chords.

"Superstar (Remember How You Got Where You Are)" was a Top 10 hit on the Billboard R&B singles chart, and peaked at #18 on the Billboard Hot 100. Notably, among the few covers of "Superstar" is a version by David Ruffin, one of the subjects of the original record, for his Whitfield-produced 1975 LP Me 'N Rock 'N Roll Are Here To Stay. Norman Whitfield's group The Undisputed Truth also recorded a version for their 1972 album Face To Face With The Truth.

== Personnel ==
- Lead and background vocals by Dennis Edwards, Melvin Franklin, Damon Harris, Richard Street, and Otis Williams
- Instrumentation by The Funk Brothers
