= Gentleman Ruffin =

Studio album by David Ruffin
- Released: 1980
- Recorded: Ocean Way Studios, Los Angeles; Davlen Sound, Los Angeles; United Sound Systems, Detroit
- Genres: Soul, R&B
- Length: 32:52
- Label: Warner Bros.
- Producer: Don Davis

David Ruffin chronology
So Soon We Change (1979)	Gentleman Ruffin (1980)	Ruffin & Kendrick (1988)

Professional ratings
Review scores
Source	Rating
Allmusic	4/5 stars

Gentleman Ruffin is the final solo album by former Temptations singer David Ruffin (1941–1991). It was released in 1980.

== Track listing ==
Side One

1. "I Wanna Be with You" (Ben Adkins)
2. "All I Need" (David T. Garner)
3. "Love Supply" (Marilyn McLeod)
4. "Still in Love with You" (Arenita Walker, Cynthia Girty)

Side Two

1. "I Got a Thing for You" (Marilyn McLeod, Pam Sawyer)
2. "Can We Make Love One More Time" (James Nelson, Les Jones)
3. "Slow Dance" (Curtis Gadson, Ron Sanders, Roz Newberry)
4. "Don't You Go Home" (Anita Brown)

== Personnel ==
- David Ruffin - vocals
- Bruce Nazarian, Eddie Willis - guitar
- Anthony Willis, Greg Coles - bass
- George Roundtree, Rudy Robinson - keyboards
- Gary Nester, Vassal Benford - synthesizer
- Jerry Jones, Lee Marcus - drums
- Carl "Butch" Small, Larry Fratangelo - percussion
- Brandye, Carolyn Franklin, Diane Lewis, Pat Lewis, Diane Hogan, Leon Ware, Marcus Cummings, Ronnie McNeir - backing vocals

== Chart history ==
Chart (1980)	Peak position
U.S. Billboard R&B Albums	66

=== Singles ===
Year	Single	Chart positions	
Year	Single	US	US R&B
1980	"Slow Dance"	—	63
