= Feelin' Good (David Ruffin album) =

Studio album by David Ruffin
- Released: November 1969
- Recorded: 1969
- Studio: Hitsville U.S.A., Detroit
- Genre: Soul, R&B
- Length: 37:33
- Label: Motown
- Producer: Terry "Buzzy" Johnson, Clay McMurray, Hank Cosby, Leonard Caston, Berry Gordy, Johnny Bristol, Ashford & Simpson, Al Kent, George Gordy, Allen Story

David Ruffin chronology
My Whole World Ended (1969)	Feelin' Good (1969)	David (1971)

Singles from Feelin' Good
- 1. "I'm So Glad I Fell For You" Released: November 18, 1969

Professional ratings
Review scores
Source	Rating
AllMusic	4.5/5 stars

Feelin' Good is the second solo album from former Temptations member David Ruffin. Released only six month after his solo debut My Whole World Ended (the #1 R&B hit), this album climbed to No. 9 on the R&B Chart. The album was arranged by David Van De Pitte, Henry Cosby, Paul Riser, Wade Marcus and Willie Shorter.

== Track listing ==
Side One

1. "Loving You (Is Hurting Me)" (Jeana Jackson, Leonard Caston Jr.)
2. "Put a Little Love in Your Heart" (Jackie DeShannon, Jimmy Holiday, Randy Myers)
3. "I'm So Glad I Fell for You" (Art Posey, Glenna Session)
4. "Feeling Alright" (Dave Mason)
5. "I Could Never Be President" (Bettye Crutcher, Homer Banks, Raymond Jackson)
6. "I Pray Everyday You Won't Regret Loving Me" (Bubba Knight, Gladys Knight, Johnny Bristol)

Side Two

1. "What You Gave Me" (Nickolas Ashford, Valerie Simpson)
2. "One More Hurt" (Albert Hamilton, Norma Toney, William Garrett)
3. "I Let Love Slip Away" (Allen Story, Anna Gordy Gaye, Horgay Gordy)
4. "I Don't Know Why I Love You" (Clay McMurray)
5. "The Forgotten Man" (Henry Cosby, Joe Hinton, Pam Sawyer)
6. "The Letter" (Al Cleveland, William Robinson, Terry Johnson)

== Chart history ==
Chart (1969)	Peak position
U.S. Billboard Top LPs	148
U.S. Billboard Top R&B Albums	9

Year	Single	Chart positions	
Year	Single	US	US R&B
1970	"I'm So Glad I Fell for You"	53	18
