= So Soon We Change =

Studio album by David Ruffin
- Released: 1979
- Recorded: United Sound Systems, Detroit; A&M, Hollywood; Soundmixers, New York City
- Genres: Soul, R&B
- Length: 36:26
- Label: Warner Bros.
- Producer: Don Davis

David Ruffin chronology
| In My Stride (1977) | So Soon We Change (1979) | Gentleman Ruffin (1980) |

So Soon We Change is a 1979 album by Temptations singer David Ruffin. It was his first album for Warner Bros. Records after years of being with Motown.

== Critical reception ==
Professional ratings
Review scores
| Source | Rating |
|---|---|
| AllMusic | 2/5 stars |
| Omaha World-Herald | 4/5 stars |
| The Virgin Encyclopedia of R&B and Soul | 1/5 stars |

The Omaha World-Herald wrote that "Ruffins' solid, grainy voice stays mostly in the middle range."

== Track listing ==
Side one

1. "Let Your Love Rain Down on Me" (Charles McCollough, Joe Shamwell, Tommy Tate)
2. "Break My Heart" (David Garner)
3. "I Get Excited" (Steven Hairston)
4. "Chain on the Brain" (Tony Hester)

Side two

1. "Morning Sun Looks Blue" (Michael Amitin)
2. "Let's Stay Together" (Don Davis, Duane Freeman)
3. "So Soon We Change" (James Dean, John Glover)
4. "Sexy Dancer" (Don Davis, Elwin Rutledge)

== Personnel ==
- David Ruffin – vocals
- Bruce Nazarian, Dennis Coffey, Norman Warner, Robert Troy – guitar
- Anthony Willis, Steven Hairston – bass
- Arnold Ingram, Michael Amitin, Ruby Robinson – keyboards
- Jerry Jones – drums
- Larry Fratangelo – percussion
- Mike Iacopelli – ARP syndrum
- Sam Peake – saxophone
- Terry Harrington – alto saxophone
- Patrick Adams – string and horn arrangements

== Chart history ==
| Chart (1979) | Peak position |
|---|---|
| U.S. Billboard R&B Albums | 19 |

=== Singles ===
| Year | Single | Chart positions | |
| Year | Single | US | US R&B |
|---|---|---|---|
| 1979 | "Break My Heart" | — | 9 |
| 1979 | "I Get Excited" | — | 79 |
"—" denotes releases that did not chart
