= Ruffin & Kendrick =

Studio album by David Ruffin & Eddie Kendricks
- Released: 1987
- Genre: R&B, soul
- Label: RCA
- Producer: Jim Bonnefond, Rick Iantosca, Ronnie McNeir, Rahni Song, John Oates, David Agent, Jay King, Gene McFadden

David Ruffin chronology
| Gentleman Ruffin (1980) | Ruffin & Kendrick (1987) |

Eddie Kendricks chronology
| I've Got My Eyes On You (1983) | Ruffin & Kendrick (1987) |

Singles from Ruffin & Kendrick
- 1. "I Couldn't Believe It" Released: 1988; 2. "One More For the Lonely Hearts Club" Released: 1988

Professional ratings
Review scores
| Source | Rating |
|---|---|
| Allmusic | 3/5 stars |

Ruffin & Kendrick is an album by David Ruffin and Eddie Kendricks, former members of The Temptations.

The album peaked at No. 60 on the Billboard R&B Albums chart.

== Track listing ==
| No. | Title | Writer(s) | Length |
|---|---|---|---|
| 1. | "I Couldn't Believe It" | Mike Crump, Renaldo Benson, Ronnie McNeir | 3:31 |
| 2. | "Ordinary Girl" | David Sandridge, Rahni Song | 4:31 |
| 3. | "One More for the Lonely Hearts Club" | Charles White, Eddie Kendrick, Marvay Braxton | 3:53 |
| 4. | "Whatever You Got" | Irwin Levine, Jim Bonnefond, Rick Iantosca | 4:05 |
| 5. | "Don't Know Why (You're Dreaming)" | Mike Crump, Renaldo Benson, Ronnie McNeir | 3:54 |
| 6. | "Family Affair" | Sylvester Stewart | 4:51 |
| 7. | "One Last Kiss" | Irwin Levine, Jim Bonnefond, Rick Iantosca | 4:24 |
| 8. | "You Only Get What You Put Out" | Gene McFadden, Linda Vitali, Paul Fox | 5:33 |
| 9. | "Goodnight Pillow" | Charles White, Eddie Kendrick, Marvay Braxton | 3:48 |

== Chart history ==
| Chart (1988) | Peak position |
|---|---|
| U.S. Billboard R&B Albums | 60 |

=== Singles ===
| Year | Single | Chart positions | |
| Year | Single | US AC | US R&B |
|---|---|---|---|
| 1987 | "I Couldn't Believe It" | 48 | 14 |
| 1988 | "One More For the Lonely Hearts Club" | — | 43 |
"—" denotes releases that did not chart
