= My Whole World Ended =

Studio album by David Ruffin
- Released: June 1969
- Recorded: 1969
- Genre: Soul, R&B
- Label: Motown
- Producer: Harvey Fuqua, Johnny Bristol, Paul Riser, Ivy Jo Hunter

David Ruffin chronology
My Whole World Ended (1969)	Feelin' Good (1969)

Singles from My Whole World Ended
- 1. "My Whole World Ended (The Moment You Left Me)" Released: January 20, 1969; 2. "I've Lost Everything I've Ever Loved" Released: June 20, 1969

Professional ratings
Review scores
Source	Rating
AllMusic	4.5/5 stars

My Whole World Ended is the debut solo album of David Ruffin, who had risen to fame as lead singer of the Temptations, from 1964 to 1968. It was released on Motown Records in June 1969.

My Whole World Ended features the title track, as well as other tracks produced by in-house Motown producers such as Harvey Fuqua, Johnny Bristol, Paul Riser and Ivy Jo Hunter.

== Track listing ==
Side one

1. "My Whole World Ended (The Moment You Left Me)" (Harvey Fuqua, Jimmy Roach, Johnny Bristol, Pam Sawyer)
2. "Pieces of a Man" (Johnny Bristol, Pam Sawyer)
3. "Somebody Stole My Dream" (Henry Cosby, Joe Hinton, Pam Sawyer)
4. "I've Lost Everything I've Ever Loved" (Johnny Bristol, Thomas Kemp)
5. "Everlasting Love" (Buzz Cason, Mac Gayden)
6. "I've Got To Find Myself a Brand New Baby" (Harvey Fuqua, Johnny Bristol, Marv Johnson, Suzanne de Passe)

Side two

1. "The Double Cross" (Allen Story, George Gordy)
2. "Message from Maria" (Al Reed)
3. "World of Darkness" (Harvey Fuqua, Thomas Kemp)
4. "We'll Have a Good Thing Going On" (Allen Story, George Gordy)
5. "My Love Is Growing Stronger" (Johnny Bristol, Marv Johnson)
6. "Flower Child" (Johnny Bristol, Doris McNeil)

== Chart history ==
Chart (1969)	Peak position
U.S. Billboard 200	31
U.S. Billboard R&B Albums	1

=== Singles ===
Year	Single	Chart positions	
Year	Single	US	US R&B
1969	"My Whole World Ended (The Moment You Left Me)"	9	2
1969	"I Lost Everything I Ever Loved"	58	11
"—" denotes releases that did not chart
