= David (David Ruffin album) =

Studio album by David Ruffin
- Released: June 25, 2004
- Recorded: January 6, 1969 – May 26, 1971
- Genres: Soul, R&B
- Label: Hip-O

David Ruffin chronology
I Am My Brother's Keeper (1970)	David (2004)	David Ruffin (1973)

Singles from David
- 1. "Each Day Is A Lifetime" Released: February 4, 1971; 2. "You Can Come Right Back To Me" Released: July 10, 1971

Professional ratings
Review scores
Source	Rating
Allmusic	4.5/5 stars

David is an album by former Temptations singer, David Ruffin. Although recorded during the late 1960s through the early 1970s, the album was not released until 2004, 13 years after Ruffin's death in 1991. The CD edition was out of print for several years, but was reissued by Hip-O Records in 2012; the 2012 edition is identical to the 2004 edition other than being packaged in a standard jewel case rather than a digipak. The album is also available for download through iTunes.

The track "Out In The Country" was written and produced by Rick James under the name Ricky Matthews while training as a producer at Motown.

Despite the album not being released until years later, it produced singles in the early 1970s such as "Each Day is a Lifetime" and "You Can Come Right Back to Me." Non

== Trtheialbum's singles sting ==
1. "Each Day Is a Lifetime" (Nick Zesses, Dino Fekaris, Henry Cosby)
2. "I Want You Back" (The Corporation)
3. "Out In the Country" (Rick James, Roderick Harrison, Ronald Matlock)
4. "You Can Come Right Back To Me" (Clifford Burston, Rose Ella Jones)
5. "I Can't Be Hurt Anymore" (Nick Zesses, Dino Fekaris, Henry Cosby)
6. "Rainy Night in Georgia" (Tony Joe White)
7. "I've Got a Need For You" (Johnny Bristol, Cardi Peters)
8. "Anything That You Ask For" (Clay McMurray, Martin Coleman)
9. "Let Somebody Love Me" (Ivy Jo Hunter, Vernon Bullock, Freddie Gorman)
10. "For The Shelter of Your Love" (Johnny Bristol, Pamela Sawyer, Joe Hinton)
11. "Dinah" (Smokey Robinson, Al Cleveland)
12. "Don't Stop Lovin' Me" (Duke Browner)
13. "It's Gonna Take a Whole Lot of Doin'" (Clay McMurray, Martin Coleman, Janie Bradford)
14. "I Want Her To Say It Again" (Merald Knight, Gladys Knight, William Guess, Johnny Bristol)
15. "Your Heartaches I Can Surely Heal" (Johnny Bristol, Cardi Peters, Robert Purdue, Lewis Peters)
16. "Get Away Heartbreak (Keep On Moving)" (Johnny Bristol, Vernon Bullock, Lena Manns)
17. "You Make Me Do Things I Don't Want To Do" (Pamela Sawyer, Joe Hinton, Henry Cosby)
18. "Mountain of Memories" (Pamela Sawyer, Martin Coleman)
19. "Heaven Help Us All" (Ron Miller)
20. "Each Day Is a Lifetime" [Mono Single Mix]
21. "Don't Stop Lovin' Me" [Mono Single Mix]
22. "You Can Come Right Back To Me" [Mono Single Mix]
23. "Dinah" [Mono Single Mix]
