= David Ruffin =

American singer (1941–1991)

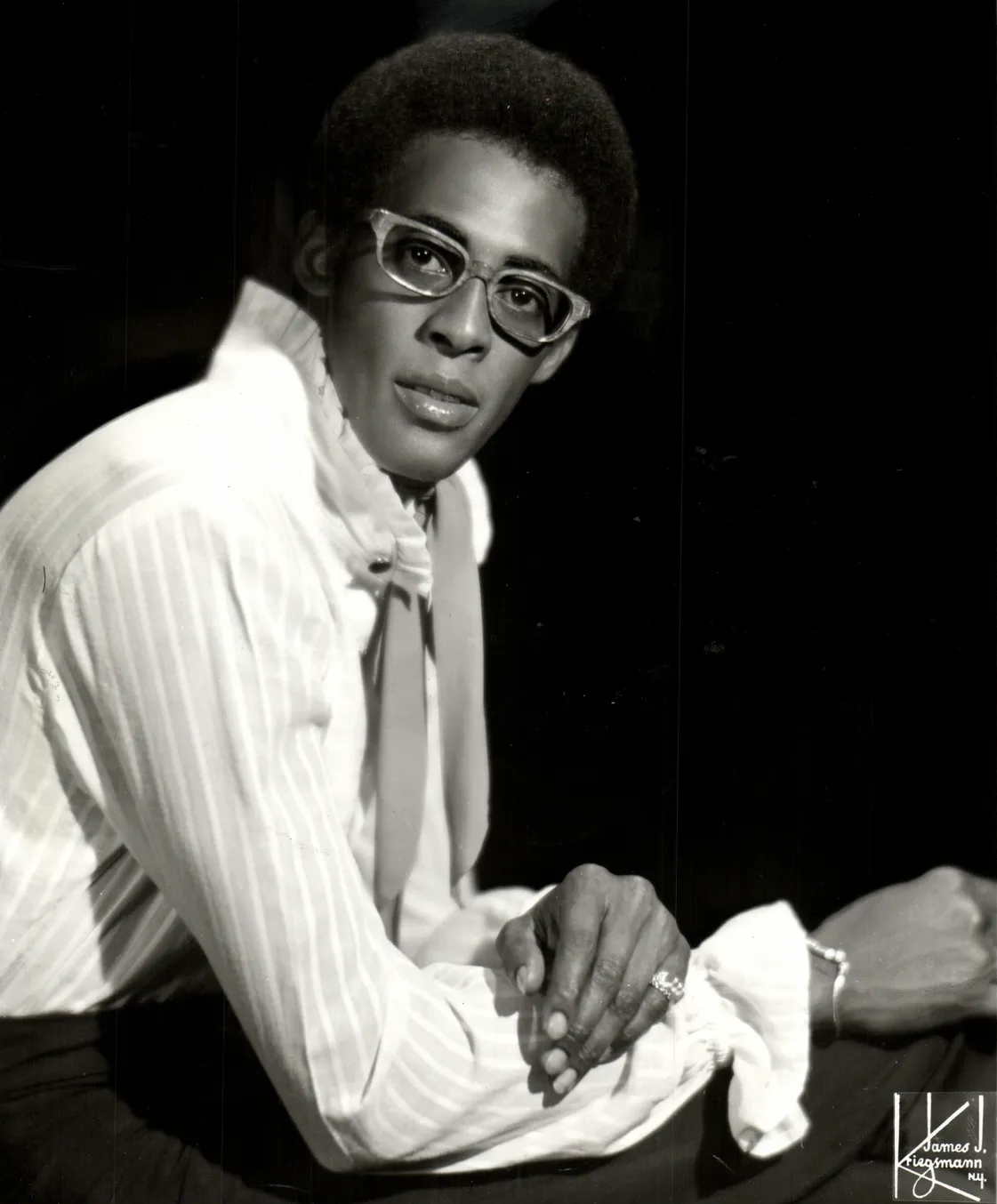
- Ruffin in 1969

Background information
- Also known as: Little David Bush
- Born: Davis Eli Ruffin; January 18, 1941; Whynot, Mississippi, U.S.
- Died: June 1, 1991 (aged 50) West Philadelphia, Pennsylvania, U.S.
- Genres: Soul; R&B; pop; rock and roll
- Occupation: Singer
- Years active: 1956–1991
- Labels: Anna; Chess; Motown; Warner Bros.; RCA

David Eli Ruffin (born Davis Eli Ruffin; January 18, 1941 – June 1, 1991) was an American soul singer most famous for his work as one of the lead singers of the Temptations (1964–1968) during the group's "Classic Five" period as it was later known. Ruffin was the lead voice on such famous songs as "My Girl" and "Ain't Too Proud to Beg". He later scored two top 10 singles as a solo artist, "My Whole World Ended (The Moment You Left Me)" and "Walk Away from Love".

Known for his unique raspy and anguished tenor vocals, Ruffin was ranked as one of the 100 Greatest Singers of All Time by Rolling Stone magazine in 2008 and again in 2023. He was inducted into the Rock and Roll Hall of Fame in 1989 for his work with the Temptations. Fellow Motown recording artist Marvin Gaye once said admiringly of Ruffin that, "I heard [in his voice] a strength my own voice lacked."

== Early life ==
Ruffin was born Davis Eli Ruffin on January 18, 1941, in the rural unincorporated community of Whynot, Mississippi, 16 miles southeast of Meridian. He was the third born son of Elias "Eli" Ruffin, a Baptist minister, and Ophelia Ruffin. His siblings were Quincy B. Ruffin, Rita Mae Ruffin, and Jimmy Lee Ruffin. Ruffin also had another sister Rosine, who died in infancy.

=== Childhood and adolescence ===
Ruffin's father was strict and at times violently abusive. Ruffin's mother died from complications of childbirth 10 months after he was born; and his father later married Earline, a schoolteacher, in 1942.

As a young child, Ruffin, along with his other siblings (older brothers Quincy and Jimmy, and sister Reada Mae) traveled with their father and their stepmother as a family gospel group, opening shows for Mahalia Jackson and The Five Blind Boys of Mississippi, among others. Ruffin sang in the choir at Mount Salem Methodist Church, talent shows and wherever else he could. In 1955, at age 14, Ruffin left home under the guardianship of a minister, Eddie Bush, and went to Memphis, Tennessee, with the purpose of pursuing the ministry.

At age 15, Ruffin went to Hot Springs, Arkansas, with the jazz musician Phineas Newborn Sr. There, they played at the Fifty Grand Ballroom and Casino. Billed as Little David Bush, Ruffin continued to sing at talent shows, worked with horses at a jockey club and eventually became a member of The Dixie Nightingales. He also sang with The Soul Stirrers briefly after the departure of Johnnie Taylor.

After some of his singing idols such as Sam Cooke and Jackie Wilson had left gospel music and gone secular, Ruffin also turned in that direction. Eddie Bush and his wife, Dorothy Helen, took the then-16-year-old Ruffin to Detroit, Michigan, where his brother, Jimmy, was pursuing a career in music while simultaneously working at the Ford Motor Company.

== Career ==
=== Early years ===
After moving to Detroit with the Bushes, Ruffin recorded his first released record with the songs "You and I" (1958) b/w "Believe Me" (1958). These songs were recorded at Vega Records and released under the name "Little David Bush", using the last name of his guardian. Ruffin would later recall how he initially recorded "a different kind of music", strongly influenced by the smoother pop and R&B of the time, when he first recorded in Detroit for Vega.

In 1957, Ruffin met Berry Gordy Jr., then a songwriter with ambitions of running his own label. Ruffin lived with Gordy's father, a contractor, and helped "Pops" Gordy do construction work on the building that would become Hitsville USA, the headquarters for Gordy's Tamla Records (later Motown Records) label. Jimmy Ruffin would eventually be signed to Tamla's Miracle Records label as an artist.

Ruffin also worked alongside another ambitious singer, Marvin Gaye, as an apprentice at Anna Records, a Chess-distributed label run by Gordy's sister Gwen Gordy Fuqua and his songwriting partner Billy Davis.

Asked about Ruffin in the Detroit Free Press in 1988, Gordy Fuqua said: "He was very much a gentleman, yes ma'am and no ma'am, but the thing that really impressed me about David was that he was one of the only artists I've seen who rehearsed like he was on stage". According to Ruffin, both he and Gaye would pack records for Anna Records.

Ruffin created music as both the vocalist and drummer in the Voice Masters, a doo-wop style combo and eventually started recording at Anna Records, where he recorded the song "I'm in Love" b/w "One of These Days" (1961), with the Voice Masters, a group which included future Motown producer, Lamont Dozier. Other group members included members of The Originals: Ty Hunter, CP Spencer, Hank Dixon and (Voice Masters and The Originals founder) Walter Gaines. (At one time, The Voice Masters also included another future Temptations member, Melvin Franklin, one of numerous people David would claim as a cousin). Ruffin did sign to Anna Records as a solo artist, but his work in that time was unsuccessful.

Ruffin eventually met an up-and-coming local group by the name of the Temptations. His older brother, Jimmy, went on a Motortown Revue tour with the Temptations, and he told David that they needed someone to sing tenor in their group. Ruffin shared his interest in joining the group with Otis Williams, who also lived in Detroit.

In January 1964, Ruffin became a member of the Temptations after founding member Elbridge "Al" Bryant was fired from the group. Ruffin's first recording session with the group was January 9, 1964. Ruffin and his brother both auditioned to join the group, but they ultimately chose David after he performed with them on stage during the label's New Year's Eve party in 1963.

=== With the Temptations (1964–1968) ===
After joining the Temptations, the bespectacled Ruffin initially sang backgrounds while the role of lead singer mostly alternated between Eddie Kendricks and Paul Williams. Ruffin did sing a few lead parts, both on stage and in the studio, during his first year with the group, but his leads on these studio tracks would not be released for over a year, as they were not considered good enough to showcase his vocals. However, Smokey Robinson, who produced and co-wrote most of the Temptations' material at this point, saw Ruffin during this period as a "sleeping giant" in the group with a unique voice that was "mellow" yet "gruff". Robinson thought that if he could write just the 'perfect song' for Ruffin's voice, then he could have a smash hit. The song was to be something that Ruffin could "belt out" yet something that was also "melodic and sweet". When Robinson achieved his goal, the song, "My Girl", was recorded in November 1964 and released a month later. It became the group's first number-one single in 1965. "My Girl" subsequently became the Temptations' signature song, and elevated Ruffin to the role of lead singer and frontman.

The follow-ups to "My Girl" were also extremely successful singles, and included the Ruffin-led hits "It's Growing" (1965), "Since I Lost My Baby" (1965), "My Baby" (1965), "Ain't Too Proud to Beg" (1966), "Beauty Is Only Skin Deep" (1966), "(I Know) I'm Losing You" (1966), "All I Need" (1967), "(Loneliness Made Me Realize) It's You That I Need" (1967), "I Wish It Would Rain" (1967), and "I Could Never Love Another (After Loving You)" (1968). Ruffin also shared lead vocals on the 1967 hit single "You're My Everything" with Eddie Kendricks. Standing at approximately 6 feet 2 inches (1.88 m) and weighing approximately 125 pounds (57 kg), Ruffin's passionate and dramatic performances endeared him to the Temptations' audiences and fans. According to Otis Williams, Ruffin (playfully nicknamed "Ruff" by the group) was a natural comedian and a hard-working singer when he first joined the group.

Ruffin's most notable non-vocal contribution to the Temptations was the masterminding of their trademark four-headed microphone stand. This enabled the other members to sing and do their dances without having to crowd around one microphone while the lead singer would sing into a separate microphone.

However, by 1967, difficulties with Ruffin became an issue for the group. He became addicted to cocaine and began missing rehearsals and performances. Refusing to travel with the other Temptations, Ruffin and his then-girlfriend, Tammi Terrell, traveled in a custom limo (with the image of his trademark black rimmed glasses painted on the door). After the Supremes had their name changed to Diana Ross & the Supremes in early 1967, Ruffin felt that he should become the focal point of the Temptations, just as Diana Ross was for her group, and began demanding that the group name be changed to David Ruffin & the Temptations. This led to a number of disagreements between Ruffin and the group's de facto leader, Otis Williams.

In addition to the group's problems with Ruffin's ego, he began inquiring into the Temptations' financial records, demanding an accounting of the group's money. This caused friction between Ruffin and Gordy.

In June 1968, the Temptations agreed that Ruffin had finally crossed the line when he missed a June 22 Cleveland, Ohio, date with the Temptations in order to attend a performance by his new girlfriend, Barbara Gail Martin (Dean Martin's daughter). Ruffin was fired five days later and was replaced with Dennis Edwards, a former member of the Contours, who had been a friend of Ruffin and the group as a whole beforehand. Though Ruffin himself personally encouraged Edwards to take his place, Ruffin began turning up unannounced at Temptations concerts during Edwards' first few dates with the group. When the group started to perform a Ruffin-era song such as "My Girl" or "Ain't Too Proud to Beg", Ruffin would suddenly walk on to the stage, take the microphone from Edwards' hands, and steal the show, embarrassing the group but entertaining the fans. According to Edwards, the adulation and Ruffin's pleas convinced the other four Temptations to give Ruffin a second chance, but when he arrived late to what was to be his return show with the group in Gaithersburg, Maryland, the Temptations decided to keep Edwards and drop considerations of rehiring Ruffin. However, Otis Williams has always maintained that Ruffin's firing was permanent, and he was never considered for rehiring.

In October 1968, Ruffin filed suit against Motown Records, seeking a release from the label and an accounting of his money. Motown counter-sued to keep the singer from leaving the label and eventually the case was settled. The settlement required Ruffin to remain with Motown to finish out his initial contract (Ruffin joined Motown as a solo artist and always had a separate contract from the other Temptations, which some felt caused a lot of the in-fighting within the group).

=== Solo years ===
Ruffin's first solo single was a song originally intended for the Temptations, "My Whole World Ended (The Moment You Left Me)". The single (from the album also titled My Whole World Ended) was released in 1969 and reached the US Pop and R&B Top Ten. This was followed by the 1969 album Feelin' Good. A third album, titled David, was recorded in 1970–71, but was shelved by Motown and did not see commercial release until 2004.

In 1970, Ruffin recorded an album with his brother Jimmy, I Am My Brother's Keeper, for which they had minor hits with "When My Love Hand (Comes Tumbling Down)" and "Your Love Was Worth Waiting For". Ruffin's next official release for Motown did not arrive until 1973 when David Ruffin was released. While his solo career initially showed promise, Ruffin quickly declined as a performer due to his cocaine addiction, and Motown only giving him the bare minimum of support when it became clear that he was not nearly as popular without the Temptations behind him.

Ruffin's final top ten hit was "Walk Away from Love" in 1975, produced by Van McCoy, which reached number nine on the Pop Charts. It was also Ruffin's only entry into the UK Charts (as a solo artist), and was a hit there as well, making it into the Top Ten (peaking at number 10) in early 1976. The single sold over one million copies and was awarded a gold disc by the R.I.A.A. in February 1976.

Other notable recordings from Ruffin's solo career include "I Lost Everything I've Ever Loved" (1969); the gospel-inflected "I'm So Glad I Fell For You" (1970); "Blood Donors Needed (Give All You Can)" (1973); "Common Man" (1973) (which was sampled on the 2001 Jay-Z song "Never Change"); "No Matter Where" (1974); "Who I Am" (1975); "Statue of a Fool" (1975); and cover versions of the Jackson Five's "I Want You Back", "Rainy Night in Georgia" (popularized by Brook Benton)—both recorded for the shelved 1970 album; and Harold Melvin and the Blue Notes' "I Miss You" (1973), featuring Eddie Kendricks (later Kendrick).

"Although some blame Ruffin's very intermittent post-Tempts success on deliberate corporate neglect, I've never found even his biggest solo hits all that undeniable—ungrouped, his voice seems overly tense whether it's grinding out grit or reaching for highs."

— Christgau's Record Guide: Rock Albums of the Seventies (1981)

After leaving Motown in 1977, Ruffin recorded for Warner Bros. Records, releasing the albums So Soon We Change (1979) and Gentleman Ruffin (1980). He then signed with RCA Records and formed a duo with fellow Temptation Eddie Kendricks, who had recently departed from the group under his own set of difficulties, including the weakening power of his voice after years of chain-smoking.

=== Collaborations ===
In 1982, Ruffin and Eddie Kendricks re-joined the Temptations for the recording of their album Reunion and a tour to promote the album, which included the R&B hit, "Standing on the Top", that the group recorded with Rick James. However, the reunion tour was short-lived since Ruffin repeatedly failed to show up for concerts while using cocaine, leading the group to be fined thousands of dollars. Otis Williams fired Ruffin from the group for the second and final time by Christmas 1982.

Ruffin started touring with Kendricks (who dropped the "s" from his last name at this time) as a duo act in 1985 when he was also dismissed for his poor singing. That year, longtime Temptations fans Hall & Oates teamed up with Ruffin and Kendrick to perform at the re-opening of the Apollo Theater in New York. Their performance was released as a successful live album and single. The four singers also sang a medley of Temptations hits at Live Aid on July 13, 1985. In 1985, a live medley of "The Way You Do the Things You Do" and "My Girl" was released by Hall & Oates featuring Ruffin and Kendrick. It reached number 20 on the Billboard Hot 100, number 12 on the Adult Contemporary chart, and number 40 on the R&B chart. The single earned Ruffin his first and only Grammy nomination. John Oates later wrote a minor hit single for Ruffin and Kendrick, but the two duos fell out, allegedly due to Daryl Hall's objections to Ruffin's heavy drug use.

After being inducted into the Rock and Roll Hall of Fame with the Temptations in 1989, Ruffin, Kendrick and Dennis Edwards began touring and recording as "Ruffin/Kendrick/Edwards: Former Leads of The Temptations". In 1991, they completed a successful month-long tour of England which grossed nearly $300,000. At the time of his death, they were planning a European tour. Ruffin's final recording in his lifetime was "Hurt the One You Love", which was released as a solo record for Motorcity Records.

== Personal life ==
=== Relationships, children and domestic abuse ===
Ruffin was married twice. His first marriage, in 1961, was to Sandra Barnes, with whom he had three daughters: Cheryl, Nedra, and Kimberly. Ruffin had a son with his long-term girlfriend, Genna Sapia, whom he met in 1964. She named their son David E. Sapia, but Ruffin later changed his name to David Eli Ruffin Jr. The three lived together for years. In 1976, Ruffin married Joy Hamilton. After his death, Sapia would add "Ruffin" to her last name in tribute to their relationship, and for continuity with her son. In 2003, Sapia-Ruffin published A Memoir: David Ruffin--My Temptation, which details Ruffin's infidelity and abusive behavior.

In 1966, Ruffin began dating Tammi Terrell after she joined the Motortown Revue opening for the Temptations. They had a tumultuous relationship. Ruffin surprised her with a marriage proposal, but after Terrell announced their engagement onstage, she learned he was already married. Ruffin became increasingly violent towards Terrell as his drug abuse worsened. Terrell ended their relationship after Ruffin hit her in the head with his motorcycle helmet in 1967. Though she had migraines since childhood, Terrell told Ebony magazine in 1969 that she believed her emotional state during this relationship was a contributing factor to her headaches. Terrell died from a brain tumor in 1970.

At the time of his death, Ruffin had been living in Philadelphia since 1989 with his girlfriend Diane Showers, who met him as a 14-year-old fan.

=== Drug addiction and legal issues ===
Ruffin first sought treatment for his drug addiction in 1967.

In 1978, Ruffin was arrested at a birthday party in Memphis. He was charged with disorderly conduct "for refusing several requests" to leave the area after he allegedly made threats against some policemen and their families while being transported to jail. Ruffin denied making threats and was released on his own recognizance.

In 1982, Ruffin was charged $5,000 and sentenced to six months in a low-security prison in Terre Haute, Indiana, for failing to pay taxes amounting to more than $310,000 over two years (1975–1977). He served four months and was released early for good behavior.

On May 19, 1986, Ruffin pleaded no contest to a charge of receiving and concealing stolen property worth less than $100 (a Colt .32-caliber handgun) and was fined $50 plus $100 in court costs. Charges of assault and battery and receiving stolen property worth more than $100 were dropped.

In July 1987, Ruffin spent a night in jail after he was arrested after a raid at a Detroit house. He was charged with cocaine possession with intent to distribute less than 20 grams (¾ oz) of cocaine. Ruffin was released after posting a $1,500 bond. He was found not guilty of possession, but was found guilty of using the drug. Ruffin was sentenced to two years' probation and 50 days of community service. In 1989, he was ordered to enter a drug rehabilitation center after violating his probation three times. Ruffin completed a 28-day drug treatment program at the Areba Casriel Institute in New York.

== Death ==
After completing a successful month-long tour of England with Kendricks and Edwards, Ruffin died on June 1, 1991, from an accidental overdose of crack cocaine; he was 50 years old. Ruffin had reportedly collapsed at a West Philadelphia crack house, where he had gone with his friend Donald Brown, according to authorities. Brown then drove Ruffin to the Hospital of the University of Pennsylvania, where he was declared dead at 3:55 a.m. due to "an adverse reaction to drugs (cocaine)" after emergency room personnel spent almost an hour attempting to revive him. The Associated Press reported that Ruffin and a man named William Nowell split ten vials of crack cocaine inside of Nowell's West Philadelphia home hours before he died. Although the cause of death was ruled an accident, Ruffin's family and friends suspected foul play, claiming that a money belt containing $40,000 was missing from his body. However, Ruffin's girlfriend at the time, Diane Showers, was not surprised when she was informed of his death. Showers stated: "When David had a lot of money, he would be able to do things that he wanted to do."

In The Temptations television miniseries, Ruffin's beaten body is depicted as being dumped in the street in front of a hospital where he dies. It was also stated in the miniseries that Ruffin's body remained unclaimed in a morgue for a week after his death. As a result, Ruffin's estate filed suit against NBC and other major players involved in the making of the series, claiming defamation. According to the plaintiffs in the case, Ruffin was actually taken to the hospital by a limousine and was escorted to the waiting area by his driver, who informed the attendants of his identity. Ruffin's children further stated that his body was claimed by one of them within a few days of his death. Ruffin's estate lost the lawsuit, and the ruling against it was upheld on appeal.

Ruffin's funeral was held at New Bethel Baptist Church in Detroit. Surviving members of the Temptations sang "My Girl". Stevie Wonder and Aretha Franklin also sang at the funeral. Michael Jackson volunteered to pay for the funeral expenses, but did not attend the service. Jackson, Rod Stewart, Daryl Hall and John Oates, Diana Ross, the Spinners, and Martha Reeves and the Vandellas sent floral arrangements.

Ruffin is buried in section three at Woodlawn Cemetery in Detroit.

== Legacy ==
Ruffin had many admirers among his fellow artists. "Nobody could sing like David Ruffin", said his close friend and colleague Martha Reeves (of Martha and the Vandellas fame). His contemporary, label-mate, and long-time acquaintance Marvin Gaye was particularly impressed with the virility of Ruffin's voice. Gaye said Ruffin's work "made me remember that when a lot of women listen to music, they want to feel the power of a real man."

Daryl Hall said, "His voice had a certain glorious anguish that spoke to people on many emotional levels". Ruffin himself said, "I don't know what kind of voice I have, I really don't...it's just about the feeling I get for the song".

Rod Stewart said: "'I Wish It Would Rain' jumped out of the speakers and ravished my soul". Stewart would later become friends with Ruffin. "His voice was so powerful—like a foghorn on the Queen Mary", Stewart told Rolling Stone in 2005.

The cover art of Ruffin's last album, Gentleman Ruffin, was the inspiration for the art of rapper Wiz Khalifa's mixtape Kush & Orange Juice.

In 2013, David Ruffin was inducted twice into the Rhythm & Blues Music Hall of Fame at Cleveland State University. He is inducted as a solo artist and member of the Temptations. Ruffin is also inducted into the Mississippi Musicians Hall of Fame.

In June 2019, the city of Detroit unveiled "David Ruffin Avenue" as the secondary street name where he formerly lived at 17385 Parkside. The ceremony was hosted by Lamont Robinson, Ruffin's son-in-law and founder of the National Rhythm & Blues Hall of Fame. It was attended by Ruffin's family and friends including Martha Reeves and Mary Wilson.

On October 26, 2019, the city of Meridian ceremonially named a section of 8th Street near the Temple Theatre "David Ruffin Boulevard". Ruffin was born in nearby rural Whynot, but claimed Meridian as home. His family was in attendance for the unveiling of his star on Mississippi's Arts + Entertainment Experience's walk of fame. During the celebrations, Jackson State University's "Sonic Boom of the South" marching band led a parade. Lamont Robinson had presented the idea to Meridian.

== In popular culture ==
On November 1 and 2, 1998, NBC aired The Temptations, a four-hour television miniseries about the group's career, Ruffin was portrayed by Leon Robinson, who won high praise for his performance, but Ruffin's family was upset with the way the series portrayed him, and filed a lawsuit against the series' producers and Otis Williams, whose memoir had been the source material. The case was dismissed in favor of the defendants, with Williams later claiming that he had no real control over the presentation of the material.

Grand Puba of Brand Nubian referenced the singer on the 1990 single "All for One", stating: "I hit a beat and swing a note as if my name was David Ruffin."

Rapper Machine Gun Kelly also referenced the singer on his 2013 song "See My Tears" stating: "Fought every temptation shit, I guess I'm David Ruffin, huh?" In 2019, rapper Lil Durk referenced David Ruffin on a song of the same name, off his mixtape Love Songs 4 the Streets 2, with lyrics such as "I know a killer who got inside that jam ... we call him David Ruffin, and they didn't even use his statement so he sang for nothin'." (The track references Ruffin's singing abilities metaphorically, as "singing" is slang in many urban neighborhoods for snitching, or telling on someone to law enforcement in order to get a lighter sentence. But, the Feds didn't end up using his statement, so he did it all for nothing.)

In 2024, rapper Rich Homie Quan referenced David Ruffin in a song on his album, Forever Going In, titled "A Way Up", with lyrics "Ain't nobody came to see you Otis, David Ruffin." (This references a scene in the Temptations miniseries, released in 1998.)

Paul K and the Weatherman have a song on the 1996 Love Is a Gas LP titled "David Ruffin's Tears".

Little Brother sampled Ruffin's song "Slow Dance" for their song "Slow It Down".

The first song on Fall Out Boy's 2005 CD From Under the Cork Tree was to have been titled "My Name is David Ruffin...and These are The Temptations", but for legal reasons the name was changed to "Our Lawyer Made Us Change the Name of This Song So We Wouldn't Get Sued".

Hip hop group Hotstylz used Ruffin's song and referred his name on their single "Lookin' Boy".

NLE Choppa referenced Ruffin on Polo G's 2020 single "Go Stupid", stating: "Givin' niggas temptation like he David Ruffin".

American rap rock group Gym Class Heroes references Ruffin in the 2008 song "Like Father, Like Son (Papa's Song)" from their album The Quilt stating: "I never understood temptation. But I guess we both got a little David Ruffin in us."

Ruffin was portrayed in the Broadway musical Ain't Too Proud by Ephraim Sykes.

Ruffin's performance at the 1969 Harlem Cultural Festival was featured in the award-winning documentary film Summer of Soul, directed by Questlove.

== Discography ==
=== Solo ===
==== Studio albums ====
- 1969: My Whole World Ended
- 1969: Feelin' Good
- 1970: I Am My Brother's Keeper (The Ruffin Brothers: David & Jimmy Ruffin)
- 1973: David Ruffin
- 1974: Me 'N Rock 'N Roll Are Here To Stay
- 1975: Who I Am
- 1976: Everything's Coming Up Love
- 1977: In My Stride
- 1979: So Soon We Change
- 1980: Gentleman Ruffin
- 1987: Ruffin & Kendrick (Ruffin & Kendrick: David Ruffin and Eddie Kendrick)
- 2004: David (recorded between 1969 and 1971)
