= Steve Gadd =

American drummer (born 1945)

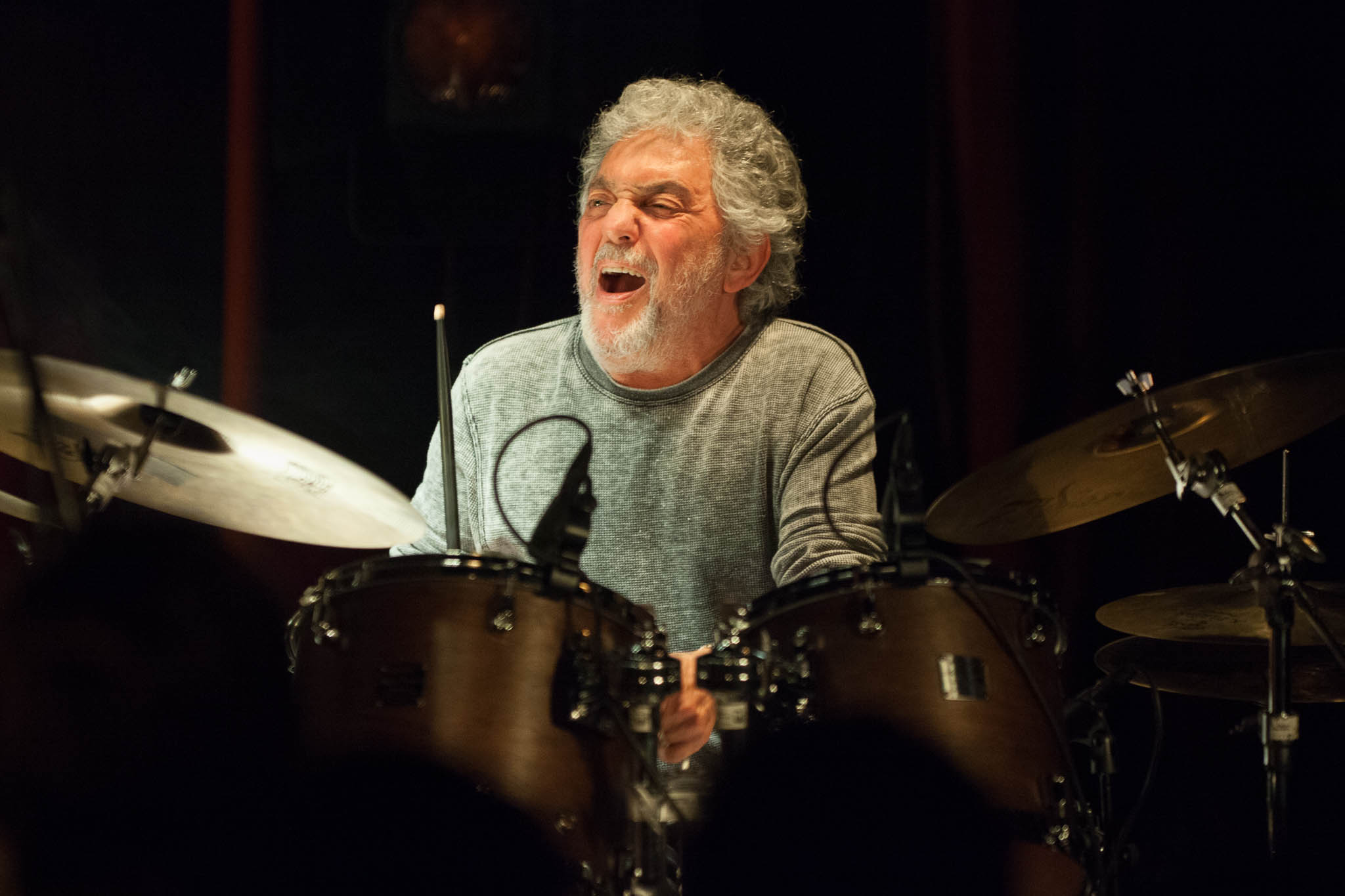
- Gadd at Bodø Jazz Open, 2014

Background information
- Born: Stephen Kendall Gadd; April 9, 1945 (age 81); Irondequoit, New York, U.S.
- Genres: Jazz fusion; jazz; soul jazz; R&B; rock; pop
- Occupations: Musician; session musician
- Instruments: Drums; percussion
- Works: Discography
- Years active: 1968–present
- Labels: Challenge; BFM
- Website: www.DrSteveGadd.com

Stephen Kendall Gadd (born April 9, 1945) is an American drummer and session musician. Gadd is one of the best-known and most highly regarded session and studio drummers in the industry, recognized by his induction into the Modern Drummer Hall of Fame in 1984. Gadd's performances on Paul Simon's "50 Ways to Leave Your Lover" (1976) and "Late in the Evening" (1980), Herbie Mann's "Hi-jack" (1975) and Steely Dan's "Aja" (1977) are examples of his style. He has worked with other popular musicians from many genres including Van McCoy, Simon & Garfunkel, James Taylor, Chick Corea, Chuck Mangione, Randy Crawford, Eric Clapton, Michel Petrucciani, Paul McCartney, Ringo Starr, and David Gilmour.

== Early life ==
Gadd grew up in Irondequoit, New York. He started playing the drums at a very early age. At age 11, he entered the Mickey Mouse National Talent Round-Up contest and was one of the winners; he won a trip to California, where he met Walt Disney and appeared on The Mickey Mouse Club, where he played the drums and did a tap-dancing routine. Gadd graduated from Eastridge High School, then attended the Eastman School of Music, graduating in 1968. He was then drafted into the United States Army, where he served the next three years playing drums in the United States Army Field Band stationed at Ft. Meade, MD.

== Career ==
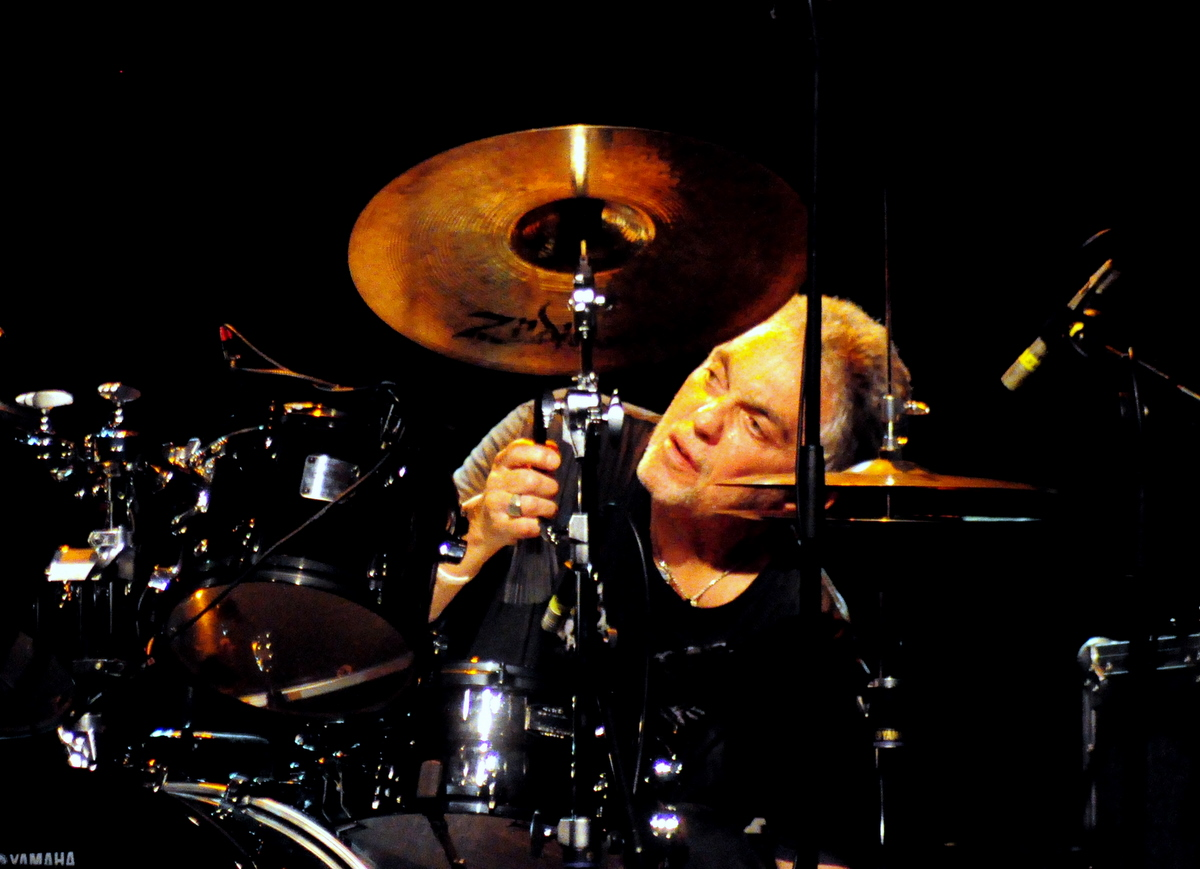
Gadd behind his drum kit in 2010

In 1968, Gadd made his first studio recording, on Gap Mangione's album Diana in the Autumn Wind.

In 1973, Gadd formed a short-lived jazz fusion band, L'Image, with Mike Mainieri, Warren Bernhardt, David Spinozza and Tony Levin. Also in 1973, he started playing on numerous albums for the jazz label CTI Records, backing artists like Milt Jackson, Chet Baker, Art Farmer, Jim Hall, and Hubert Laws. In the late 1970s, he formed a jazz fusion group, Stuff, with Eric Gale, Richard Tee, and other members. Gadd played drums on the title track of Steely Dan's 1977 jazz-rock album Aja; the drum solo he played at the end of the song has become "the stuff of legend", according to a 2019 Jazziz article, with its "explosive tom-tom runs and crisp cymbal grooves". Other notable recordings from the 1970s are Van McCoy's hit "The Hustle" (1975), Paul Simon's "50 Ways To Leave Your Lover" (1975), Rickie Lee Jones's "Chuck E.'s in Love" (1979), Chick Corea's album "The Leprechaun" (1976), Herb Alpert's album "Beyond" (1980), and Marc Cohn's album "Marc Cohn" (1991).

In 1981, he played drums and percussion for Simon and Garfunkel's Concert in Central Park.

Gadd was a member of the Manhattan Jazz Quintet from its founding in 1983 until he left in 1987, replaced by Dave Weckl, although he has reunited with the group several times since then. The group has only officially released its albums in Japan, and is best known there.

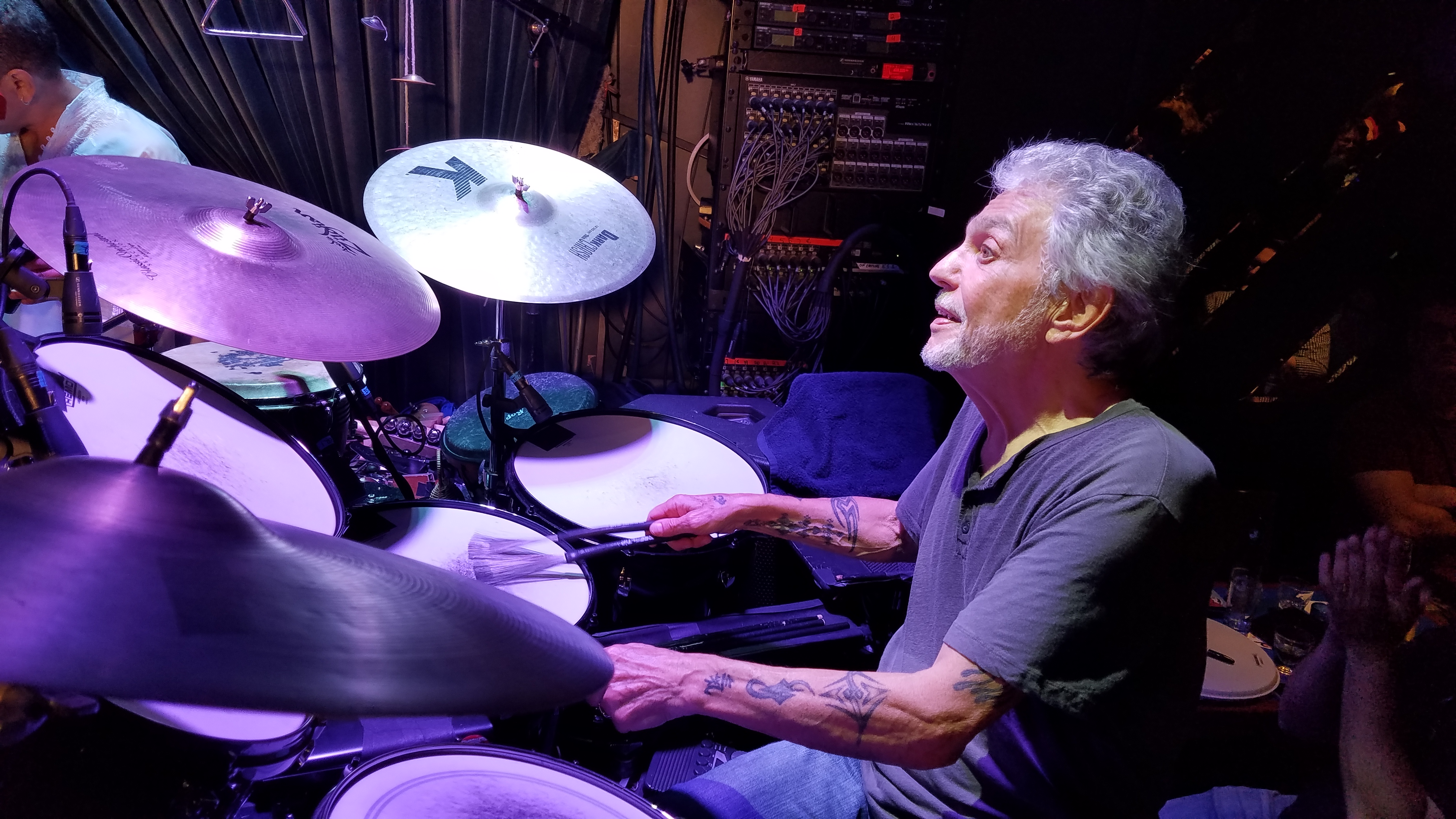
Steve Gadd plays with the brushes while watching Chick Corea during their show at the Blue Note in New York City on Friday, September 29, 2017

Gadd toured the entire year of 1991 with Paul Simon. He recorded and toured with Eric Clapton in 1994/1996 and again from 1997 to 2004. 1997 also saw him on a world tour in a trio with the French jazz great Michel Petrucciani and his long-time band colleague, bassist Anthony Jackson (captured on the Trio in Tokyo live album). Gadd played on the blues album Riding with the King along with B. B. King, Eric Clapton, Jimmie Vaughan and a few others. In 2009, Gadd returned to Clapton's band to play 11 nights at the Royal Albert Hall and was part of Clapton's touring band throughout May 2009. Also in 2009, Gadd reunited with L'Image, and the group performed at the Iridium Jazz Club in New York City, toured Japan and Europe, and released the album L'Image 2.0.

Gadd has toured for many years with James Taylor. Since 2014, Gadd has played in a soul-jazz trio Blicher Hemmer Gadd with four-time Danish Grammy winner Michael Blicher (saxophone) and Dan Hemmer (Hammond organ). Blicher Hemmer Gadd has released four albums.

Gadd has written a book about the rudiments of drumming entitled Gaddiments, which was released on Hudson Music in 2021.

== Influences ==
Gadd's influences include Buddy Rich, Elvin Jones, Tony Williams, and the "less is more" style of Rick Marotta.

== Equipment ==
Gadd endorses and uses Yamaha drums, pedals and hardware, Zildjian cymbals, Remo drumheads, Latin Percussion, Earthworks microphones, Vic Firth sticks and brushes, and Beato bags.

Gadd uses the Steve Gadd Commemorative kit, which Yamaha made for the 30th anniversary of his collaboration with the company. The kit consists of a 22"×14" maple bass drum and 10"×7.5", 12"×8", 14"×12" and 16"×14" birch tom toms. He uses his 14"×5.5" Yamaha Steve Gadd signature steel snare drum with wood hoops, which also comes in birch and maple versions, and he has started to endorse the newer Yamaha Recording Custom series.

Gadd has also used a Yamaha Club Custom drum kit in a blue swirl finish.

Gadd also has Vic Firth sticks with his signature on them. The drumsticks are very light and thin, black in color, and have normal "wood color" on the tips. There is also an identical model with nylon tips. The stick is slightly shorter than the American Classic 5A, and features a barrel tip for improved recording sound. It is 15 3/4 in (40.0 cm) long and the diameter is .550 in (1.40 cm). In addition to having his own signature stick, he has his own signature brushes. These brushes are intended to solve the problem of wire brushes snagging on new coated drumheads by slightly angling the wires in the top 3/4 inch (1.9 cm) of the playing end. The wires glide across the head, allowing a smoother sweep and a velvet swish sound.

Gadd uses a variety of Remo heads: a Coated Powerstroke 3 on the batter side of the snare with a Hazy Diplomat on the resonant side of the snare, Clear Pinstripes or Coated Ambassadors on the batter sides of toms, and Clear Ambassadors for the resonant sides. He is using a Coated Powerstroke 3 both on his snare and kick drum.

He also has an LP Steve Gadd signature cowbell, modeled on the LP Mambo cowbell that he has used since the 1970s.

According to Allmusic, Gadd has been credited with playing surdo, kalimba, timpani, tambourine, congas, bass drum, bongos, timbales, snare drum, cymbals and palmas in addition to a drum kit.

== Awards and honors ==
- Honorary Doctor of Music degree, Berklee College of Music, 2005
- Grammy Award nomination, Best Contemporary Instrumental Album, Way Back Home, 2017
- Honorary Doctor of Music degree, Eastman School of Music, University of Rochester, October 13, 2017
- Grammy Award for Best Contemporary Instrumental Album, Steve Gadd Band, 2018
- Danish Grammy Award nomination, Best Instrumental Jazz Album, Omara with Blicher Hemmer Gadd, 2018

== Discography ==
As leader/co-leader

- Gaddabout (Electric Bird, 1984)
- The Boys from Rochester with Chuck Mangione (Feels So Good, 1989)
- Together Forever with Chuck Mangione (Gates Music, 1994)
- Trio in Tokyo with Michel Petrucciani (Dreyfus, 1999)
- Steps/Smokin' in the Pit (NYC, 1999)
- Super Trio with Chick Corea, Christian McBride (Mad Hatter, 2006)
- Live at Voce (BFM, 2010)
- Gadditude (BFM, Challenge 2013)
- Blicher Hemmer Gadd (C-Nut, 2014)
- 70 Strong (BFM, 2015)
- Way Back Home (BFM, 2016)
- Chinese Butterfly with Chick Corea (Stretch, 2017)
- Steve Gadd Band (BFM, 2018)
