= In My Stride =

Studio album by David Ruffin
- Released: June 1977
- Recorded: Mediasound (New York City)
- Genre: Soul, R&B
- Label: Motown
- Producer: Van McCoy

David Ruffin chronology
| Everything's Coming Up Love (1976) | In My Stride (1977) | So Soon We Change (1979) |

Singles from In My Stride
- 1. "Just Let Me Hold You for a Night" Released: June 1977; 2. "You're My Peace of Mind" Released: December 1977

In My Stride is an album by David Ruffin, released in 1977. It was his last studio album for Motown Records.

== Critical reception ==
Professional ratings
Review scores
| Source | Rating |
|---|---|
| AllMusic | 4/5 stars |
| The Encyclopedia of Popular Music | 2/5 stars |
| The Rolling Stone Album Guide | 2/5 stars |

The Bay State Banner wrote that "even in the most [Lou] Rawls-inspired copy cuts, the bluesy soul of Ruffin the man squirms out, mocking the thickly cosmetic contrivance of his Van McCoy-produced work."

== Track listing ==
All Tracks composed by Van McCoy; except where indicated

1. "You're My Peace of Mind"
2. "Just Let Me Hold You for a Night" (Charles H. Kipps, Jr.)
3. "I Can't Stop the Rain" (Charles H. Kipps, Jr.)
4. "Nightmare"
5. "Questions" (Charles H. Kipps, Jr.)
6. "I'm Jealous"
7. "Hey Woman"
8. "There's More to Love"
9. "Rode by the Place (Where We Used to Stay)" (Marv Johnson)

== Chart history ==
| Chart (1977) | Peak position |
|---|---|
| U.S. Billboard R&B Albums | 36 |

=== Singles ===
| Year | Single | Chart positions | |
| Year | Single | US | US R&B |
|---|---|---|---|
| 1977 | "Just Let Me Hold You for a Night" | — | 18 |
| 1978 | "You're My Peace of Mind" | — | 71 |
"—" denotes releases that did not chart
