= Smokey Robinson & The Miracles: 1957–1972 =

1957–1972

Live album by The Miracles
- Released: December 8, 1972
- Recorded: 1972
- Genre: Soul
- Length: 57:32
- Label: Tamla; TS-320
- Producer: Smokey Robinson

The Miracles chronology
Flying High Together (1972)	1957–1972 (1972)	Renaissance (1973)

Professional ratings
Review scores
Source	Rating
Allmusic	link
Christgau's Record Guide	B+

1957–1972 is a 1972 double album by The Miracles on Motown Records' Tamla label. This two-record set is noted as the group's final series of live concerts with original lead singer Smokey Robinson, recorded over a period of three days, July 14–16, during the 1972 National Parks Centennial, at the Carter Barron Amphitheater in Washington, D.C., and charted at No. 75 on the Billboard Top 200 Album chart, and at No. 14 on its R&B Album chart. During the show, Smokey's wife, original Miracles member Claudette Rogers Robinson, who stopped touring with the group in 1964 (but continued recording with them), reunited with the Miracles on stage for the first time in eight years. As a celebration of the group's fifteen years together, The Miracles made this an "all request" show, where audience members could choose which of the group's long string of hits they wanted performed. Also, at the end of the concert, Miracles fans were introduced to the group's new lead singer, Billy Griffin. According to Smokey's autobiography, Smokey: Inside My Life, The Miracles' final concert was videotaped in movie form, but was never publicly released. However, 1957–1972 was released on CD originally in 1990, and re-released again in 2004 along with The Miracles' 1969 "Live" album in the 2004 Motown/Hip-O Select release Smokey Robinson and The Miracles: The Live Collection.

== Track listing ==
=== Side one ===
1. "The Tears of a Clown" (Smokey Robinson, Hank Cosby, Stevie Wonder)
2. "I Don't Blame You at All" (Robinson)
3. "Satisfaction" (Robinson)
4. "Got to Be There" (Elliot Willensky)

=== Side two ===
1. "More Love" (Robinson)
2. "We've Come Too Far to End It Now" (Johnny Bristol, Wade Brown, Jr., David Jones, Jr.)
3. "Abraham, Martin & John" (Dick Holler)

=== Side three ===
1. "Intro of Orchestra"
2. "Bad Girl" (Robinson, Berry Gordy)
3. "Shop Around" (Robinson, Gordy)
4. "The Tracks of My Tears" (Robinson, Pete Moore, Marv Tarplin)
5. "Here I Go Again (Robinson, Moore, Al Cleveland, Terry "Buzzy" Johnson)

=== Side four ===
1. "Ooo Baby Baby" (Robinson, Moore)
2. "Mickey's Monkey" (Holland-Dozier-Holland)
3. "Going to a Go-Go" (Robinson, Bobby Rogers, Moore, Tarplin)
- Note: Includes Smokey's farewell and introduction of his successor, new Miracles lead singer Billy Griffin.

== Personnel ==
The Miracles

- Smokey Robinson
- Claudette Rogers Robinson
- Pete Moore
- Ronnie White
- Bobby Rogers
- Marv Tarplin
- Orchestra conducted by: Thomas "Beans" Bowles
