= De Passe Jones Entertainment =

US entertainment content provider

de Passe Jones Entertainment
- Formerly: Motown Productions (1968–1990); Gordy/de Passe Productions (1990–1992); de Passe Entertainment (1992–2008)
- Type: Private
- Industry: Entertainment, Television, Film
- Founded: 1968; 58 years ago
- Founder: Berry Gordy Jr.
- Headquarters: Los Angeles, California, United States
- Products: Motion pictures Television series Television specials
- Website: www.depassejones.com

de Passe Jones Entertainment (dJE) is an American entertainment content provider led by Suzanne de Passe and Madison Jones that sources, develops, acquires, and produces a variety of television, motion picture, theater, new media, and print content. The company was founded by Berry Gordy Jr., in 1968, as Motown Productions, the film and television arm of Gordy's Motown Records label. It became de Passe Entertainment in 1992, then in 2008, joining forces with Jones, de Passe Jones Entertainment.

== History ==
=== Motown Productions ===
Motown Productions' original focus was on the production of television specials for its star recording artists. These included TCB (1968) and G.I.T. on Broadway (1969), starring Diana Ross & the Supremes with The Temptations, The Temptations Show (also 1969), The Smokey Robinson Show (1970), Diana! (1971) starring Diana Ross, and Goin' Back to Indiana (also 1971) starring The Jackson 5. When Suzanne de Passe joined Motown in 1968, much of her work involved the production of these television specials. Motown's first television series was The Jackson 5ive (1971–1973), a Saturday morning cartoon by Rankin/Bass starring characters based upon Motown's popular teen act.

The company's first feature film was Lady Sings the Blues (1972), a Billie Holiday biographical film starring Diana Ross as Holliday and Billy Dee Williams as her husband Louis McKay. After Lady Sings the Blues became a success, garnering box office success and five Academy Award nominations, Ross and Williams were paired for a second feature, Mahogany (1975). Both films were coupled with successful music releases: Lady Sings the Blues was accompanied with a platinum-selling soundtrack album by Ross, while Mahogany featured Ross' number-one pop hit "Theme from Mahogany (Do You Know Where You're Going To)" Other Motown films included Scott Joplin (1977), another musician biopic starring Billy Dee Williams, and Thank God It's Friday (1978), which starred Donna Summer and featured her hit song "Last Dance".

Following the commercial and critical failure of Motown's eighth film, a 1978 adaptation of the Broadway musical The Wiz starring Diana Ross and the Jackson 5's Michael Jackson, the company focused more closely on television. Its productions during the late 1970s and early 1980s included TV movies such as Amateur Night at the Dixie Bar and Grill, (1979) and Callie & Son (1981) and TV specials such as the popular and successful Motown 25: Yesterday, Today, and Forever (1983). Motown 25, an anniversary special for the Motown Records label, was most noted for featuring Michael Jackson's famous performance of his non-Motown hit song "Billie Jean". By this time, Suzanne de Passe had become the executive producer in charge of Motown's film and TV products. Motown briefly returned to feature films with Berry Gordy's The Last Dragon, which became Motown's final theatrical feature. In 1986, Motown Productions had inked an agreement with video distributor MCA Home Video in an effort to expand the direct-to-video market with a series of "Motown Video Originals" mini-movie series.

=== de Passe Entertainment ===
de Passe Entertainment logo

In 1988, Gordy sold Motown Records to MCA Inc. (owner of Universal Studios, which co-produced four films with Motown) and Boston Ventures. The following year, he sold Motown Productions to de Passe, and the company continued its success in television with the popular miniseries Lonesome Dove (1989). The company after broke from Motown, was originally named Gordy/de Passe Productions before adapting the de Passe Entertainment name in 1992. A sequel, Streets of Laredo, would follow in 1995. Changing its name to de Passe Entertainment in 1992, the company has produced a number of successful TV programs, among them Sister, Sister (1994–1999), Smart Guy (1997–1999), and It's Showtime at the Apollo (produced by de Passe from 2002 to 2008). Successful TV specials from the company include Motown biopics such as The Jacksons: An American Dream (1992) and The Temptations (1998), The Loretta Claiborne Story (2000), and the Essence Awards and NAACP Image Awards telecasts. de Passe Entertainment also produced the feature films Class Act (1992), starring rappers Kid 'n Play, and Who's the Man? (1993), starring hip-hop radio personalities Doctor Dré and Ed Lover.

=== de Passe Jones Entertainment ===
In 2008, Suzanne de Passe joined with veteran producer Madison Jones to form de Passe Jones Entertainment which is headquartered in Los Angeles, California.

== Films ==
=== Motown Productions ===
- The Supremes In The Orient (1966) (Never Released)
- Lady Sings the Blues (1972, Paramount Pictures)
- Mahogany (1975, Paramount Pictures)
- The Bingo Long Traveling All-Stars & Motor Kings (1976, Universal Pictures)
- Scott Joplin (1977, Universal Pictures)
- Big Time (1977, WorldWide Pictures)
- Thank God It's Friday (1978, Columbia Pictures)
- Almost Summer (1978, Universal Pictures)
- The Wiz (1978, Universal Pictures)
- The Last Dragon (1985, TriStar Pictures)

=== de Passe Entertainment ===
- Class Act (1992, Warner Bros.)
- Who's the Man? (1993, New Line Cinema)

== Notable television films, miniseries, and specials ==
=== Motown Productions ===
- TCB (1968, NBC)
- G.I.T. on Broadway (1969, NBC)
- The Temptations Show (1969, Syndicated)
- The Smokey Robinson Show (1970, ABC)
- Diana! (1971, ABC)
- Goin' Back to Indiana (1971, ABC)
- An Evening with Diana Ross (1977, NBC)
- Amateur Night at the Dixie Bar and Grill (1979, NBC)
- The Last Song (1980, CBS)
- A Small Killing (1981, CBS)
- Callie & Son (1981, CBS)
- Happy Endings (1983, CBS)
- Motown 25: Yesterday, Today, Forever (1983, NBC)
- Motown Returns to the Apollo (1985, NBC)
- The Motown Revue (1986, NBC)
- Temptations and Four Tops (1986, Showtime)
- Marvin Gaye (1987, Showtime)
- Motown Merry Christmas (1987, NBC)
- Michael Jackson: The Legend Continues (1988, Showtime)
- Lonesome Dove (1989, CBS)
- Small Sacrifices (1989, ABC)
- The Jacksons: An American Dream (1992, ABC)

=== de Passe Entertainment ===
- Streets of Laredo (1995, CBS)
- The Temptations (1998)
- Motown 40: The Music is Forever (1998)
- Zenon: Girl of the 21st Century (1999)
- Zenon: The Zequel (2001)
- Motown 45 (2004)
- Zenon: Z3 (2004)

== Notable television series ==
=== Motown Productions ===
- The Jackson 5ive (1971–1973, ABC; with Rankin-Bass)
- Nightlife (1986–1987, syndicated; with King World Productions)
- Sidekicks (1986–1987, ABC; with Walt Disney Television)
- Kid 'n Play (1990, NBC; with Marvel Productions and Saban Entertainment)
- RollerGames (1990-1992, syndicated)

=== de Passe Entertainment ===
- Sister, Sister (1994–1999, ABC/WB with Paramount Television)
- Smart Guy (1997–1999, WB with Walt Disney Television)
- Showtime at the Apollo (2002–2008 syndication/FOX with Warner Bros. Television Distribution)
- All American Girl (2003, ABC/ABC Family)
- On Our Own (1994–1995, ABC with Warner Bros. Television)

== Productions ==
In 2009, dJE produced President Barack Obama's Commander in Chief's Inaugural Ball.
