= Smokey Robinson & the Miracles LIVE! =

Live album by Smokey Robinson & the Miracles
- Released: January 6, 1969
- Recorded: 1968
- Venues: Roostertail, Detroit, Michigan
- Genre: Soul
- Labels: Tamla; TS 289
- Producer: Smokey Robinson

Smokey Robinson & the Miracles chronology
Special Occasion (1968)	Smokey Robinson & the Miracles LIVE! (1969)	Time Out for Smokey Robinson & The Miracles (1969)

Smokey Robinson & the Miracles LIVE! (TS289) is a 1969 album by R&B group The Miracles (aka "Smokey Robinson & the Miracles"). Issued on Motown's Tamla label, it is the second of three live albums the Miracles recorded during their career. The album was recorded in 1968 at Detroit's famous Roostertail Restaurant, a popular venue where Motown artists appeared during the 1960s and 1970s. Released January 6, 1969, it charted at #71 on the Billboard Pop Album Chart and peaked at #7 on the Billboard R&B Album Chart.

The concert that spawned the album was aimed at an adult supper-club crowd, instead of the group's usual teenaged market. It consisted of a combination of several of the group's greatest hits, along with standards. The album, which documented a much more polished and professional performance than the one on the group's first live album, The Miracles Recorded Live on Stage, revealed the Miracles' tremendous growth as experienced performers during the intervening six years.

There were two important changes in the group's personnel since the previous live album. Miracles' bass singer Pete Moore, whose career had been interrupted by military service, had returned to the group by this time and was present on this album, while Miracles member Claudette (Mrs. Smokey) Robinson, who was on the first live album, had retired from live performances five years before this album appeared. (Claudette Robinson continued to appear on studio recordings with the group and also appeared on the group's third and final live album, 1957–1972. In fact, this is the only Miracles live album in which Claudette does not appear.)

In addition to Miracles favorites such as "The Tracks of My Tears", "Ooo Baby Baby", "Mickey's Monkey", "I Second That Emotion", "If You Can Want", and "Going to a Go-Go", the album also included the group's latest single, "Yester Love". Standards included "Poinciana" (recorded by Bing Crosby, Vic Damone, Ahmad Jamal, Johnny Mathis, and numerous others), Dionne Warwick's "(Theme from) Valley of the Dolls", and another Warwick classic, "Walk On By". Other covers included the Fifth Dimension's smash hit "Up, Up and Away", and the Beatles' "Yesterday", which the Miracles had performed live on The Ed Sullivan Show the previous year. Miracles member Marv Tarplin was on both live albums but was uncredited for reasons unknown. Tarplin was credited on 1957–1972, and did appear with the group on The Ed Sullivan Show in 1968.

Smokey Robinson & the Miracles LIVE! was released in 2004 on a Motown two-CD set together with the group's final live album, 1957–1972, through Hip-O Select, under the name Smokey Robinson & the Miracles: The Live Collection. This album was in store’s before Christmas 1969

== Track listing ==
=== Side one ===
1. "Once in a Lifetime"/"You and the Night and the Music"
2. "I Second That Emotion" (Smokey Robinson, Al Cleveland)
3. "The Tracks of My Tears" (Robinson, Pete Moore, Marv Tarplin)
4. "Poinciana" (Nat Simon, Buddy Bernier)
5. "Up, Up and Away" (Jimmy Webb)
6. "(Theme from) Valley of the Dolls" (André Previn, Dory Previn)
7. "Yester Love" (Robinson, Cleveland)

=== Side two ===
1. "Walk On By" (Burt Bacharach, Hal David)
2. "Yesterday" (John Lennon, Paul McCartney)
3. "If You Can Want" (Robinson, Cleveland)
4. "Mickey's Monkey" (Brian Holland, Lamont Dozier, Eddie Holland)
5. "Ooo Baby Baby" (Robinson, Moore)
6. "Going to a Go-Go" (Robinson, Moore, Tarplin, Bobby Rogers)

== Personnel ==
The Miracles

- Smokey Robinson
- Bobby Rogers
- Pete Moore
- Ronnie White
- Marv Tarplin
