= Sweet Charity (disambiguation) =

Sweet Charity is a musical with music by Cy Coleman and lyrics by Dorothy Fields.

Sweet Charity may also refer to:

== Cast albums ==
- Sweet Charity (original Broadway cast recording), a 1966 album containing a recording of the musical by the 1966 original Broadway cast
- Sweet Charity (1986 Broadway cast recording), a 1986 album containing a recording of the musical by the 1986 Broadway revival cast

== Film and its soundtrack ==
- Sweet Charity (film), a 1969 film adapted from the musical
  - Sweet Charity (soundtrack), an album containing the soundtrack to the film

== Other ==
- Sweet Charity (band), a Singaporean rock kapak band
