= Time Out for Smokey Robinson & The Miracles =

Time Out for Smokey Robinson & the Miracles

Studio album by Smokey Robinson & the Miracles
- Released: July 10, 1969
- Studio: Hitsville USA, Detroit
- Genre: Soul
- Length: 36:38
- Label: Tamla; TS 295
- Producer: Smokey Robinson

Smokey Robinson & the Miracles chronology
Live! (1969)	Time Out for Smokey Robinson & the Miracles (1969)	Four in Blue (1969)

Singles from Time Out for Smokey Robinson & The Miracles
- 1. "Baby, Baby Don't Cry" Released: December 12, 1968; 2. ""Doggone Right"/Here I Go Again" Released: May 28, 1969

Professional ratings
Review scores
Source	Rating
AllMusic	2/5 stars

Time Out for Smokey Robinson & the Miracles is a 1969 album by Motown group the Miracles. It reached #25 on the Billboard Pop Album chart, and contains four pop top 40 singles – "Doggone Right", "Abraham, Martin & John", "Here I Go Again" and the top ten pop smash hit "Baby, Baby Don't Cry". Time Out also features covers of Motown songs such as "For Once in My Life" and the Robinson-penned songs "My Girl" and "The Composer". Miracles members Marv Tarplin, Pete Moore and Ronnie White were also co-writers on several of the album's tracks, along with Motown staff songwriters Al Cleveland, Ron Miller and Terry Johnson. Miracle Pete Moore also co-produced two of the album's tracks, a prelude to his later production of the Miracles' massively successful platinum-selling City of Angels album of a few years later. The Miracles' Time Out album was originally released on CD in 1986, and again in 2001 coupled with their album, Four in Blue.

== Track listing ==
=== Side one ===
1. "Doggone Right" (Robinson, Marvin Tarplin, Al Cleveland)
2. "Baby, Baby Don't Cry" (Cleveland, Terry "Buzzy" Johnson, Robinson)
3. "My Girl" (Robinson, Ronald White)
4. "The Hurt Is Over" (Robinson, Tarplin, Cleveland)
5. "You Neglect Me" (Robinson, Tarplin)
6. "Abraham, Martin & John" (Dick Holler)

=== Side two ===
1. "For Once in My Life" (Ron Miller, Orlando Murden)
2. "Once I Got To Know You (Couldn't Help But Love You)" (Johnson, Robinson)
3. "Wichita Lineman" (Jimmy Webb)
4. "The Composer" (Robinson)
5. "Here I Go Again" (Robinson, Johnson, Cleveland, Warren Moore)
6. "I'll Take You Anyway That You Come" (Robinson)

== Personnel ==
=== The Miracles ===
- Smokey Robinson – lead vocals
- Ronnie White, Bobby Rogers, Warren "Pete" Moore (co-lead on "Doggone Right"), Claudette Robinson – backing vocals
- Marv Tarplin – guitar
- Smokey Robinson – producer, album executive producer
- Warren "Pete" Moore and Terry "Buzzy" Johnson – co-producer on "Baby, Baby Don't Cry" and "Here I Go Again"
- Funk Brothers – other instrumentations
