= Together (The Supremes and the Temptations album) =

- Original LP cover

Studio album by Diana Ross & the Supremes and the Temptations
- Released: September 23, 1969
- Recorded: August 1968 – June 1969
- Genres: Pop, soul
- Label: Motown
- Producers: Frank Wilson, Smokey Robinson, Al Clevland, Terry Johnson, Tom Baird, Henry Cosby, Deke Richards

Diana Ross & the Supremes chronology
Let the Sunshine In (1969)	Together (1969)	Cream of the Crop (1969)

The Temptations chronology
Puzzle People (1969)	Together (1969)	On Broadway (1969)

Alternative cover
- The original American LP for Together has a cover which folds out to reveal a full illustration of The Supremes and the Temptations. The full artwork was also used for some international versions of the album without requiring the cover to be unfolded.

Singles from Together
- 1. "The Weight"; 2. "Why (Must We Fall in Love)"

Together, released by Motown in 1969, is the second and final duets studio album combining Diana Ross & the Supremes and the Temptations into an eight-person Motown act. Like the first duets LP, Diana Ross & the Supremes Join The Temptations, it is composed almost entirely of covers, including versions of The Band's "The Weight", Sly & the Family Stone's "Sing a Simple Song", Frankie Valli's "Can't Take My Eyes Off You" (featuring Mary Wilson leading, in preparation for Ross' departure from the Supremes) and Motown songs like "Ain't Nothing Like the Real Thing" and "Uptight (Everything's Alright)". "The Weight" was the only single in the US, and failed to make it into the American Top 40. "Why (Must We Fall in Love)", a UK exclusive single, was a Top 40 hit on the UK singles charts.

Together was released on the same day (September 23, 1969) as Puzzle People, a regular Temptations album showcasing the group's then-current psychedelic soul sound.

Professional ratings
Review scores
Source	Rating
Allmusic	2/5 stars

== Track listing ==
No.	Title	Writer(s)	Lead singers	Length
1.	"Stubborn Kind of Fellow"	Marvin Gaye; Mickey Stevenson; George Gordy	Diana Ross; Paul Williams; Eddie Kendricks	3:10
2.	"I'll Be Doggone"	Smokey Robinson; Pete Moore; Marv Tarplin	Ross; P. Williams	3:32
3.	"The Weight"	Robbie Robertson	Ross; P. Williams; Eddie Kendricks	3:02
4.	"Ain't Nothing Like the Real Thing"	Nick Ashford; Valerie Simpson	Ross; P. Williams; Kendricks	2:44
5.	"Uptight (Everything's Alright)"	Stevie Wonder; Hank Cosby; Sylvia Moy	Ross; Dennis Edwards; Melvin Franklin	3:05
6.	"Sing a Simple Song"	Sly Stone	Ross; P. Williams; Kendricks; Edwards; Franklin; Otis Williams	3:33
7.	"My Guy / My Girl" (Medley)	Robinson; Ronnie White	Ross; Edwards	3:13
8.	"For Better or Worse"	Pam Sawyer; Joe Hinton	Ross; Kendricks	2:37
9.	"Can't Take My Eyes Off You"	Bob Crewe; Bob Gaudio	Mary Wilson; Kendricks	3:11
10.	"Why (Must We Fall in Love)"	Deke Richards; Sherlie Matthews	Ross; Kendricks	3:05

== Personnel ==
- Diana Ross – vocals
- Mary Wilson – vocals
- Cindy Birdsong – vocals
- Dennis Edwards – vocals
- Eddie Kendricks – vocals
- Paul Williams – vocals
- Melvin Franklin – vocals
- Otis Williams – vocals
- The Andantes – additional background vocals
- Frank Wilson – producer, executive producer
- Smokey Robinson – producer
- Al Clevland – producer
- Terry Johnson – producer
- Tom Baird – producer/arranger
- Various Los Angeles area session musicians – instrumentation

== Charts ==
Chart (1969)	Peak position
Canada Top Albums/CDs (RPM)	29
UK Albums (Official Charts)	28
UK R&B Albums (Record Mirror)	4
US Billboard 200	28
US Top R&B/Hip-Hop Albums (Billboard)	6
