= Four in Blue =

Four In Blue

Studio album by Smokey Robinson & the Miracles
- Released: November 3, 1969
- Recorded: 1969
- Studio: Hitsville USA, Detroit
- Genre: Soul
- Length: 39:10
- Label: Tamla; TS-297
- Producer: Smokey Robinson

Smokey Robinson & the Miracles chronology
Time Out for Smokey Robinson & The Miracles (1969)	Four In Blue (1969)	What Love Has...Joined Together (1970)

Professional ratings
Review scores
Source	Rating
AllMusic	2.5/5 stars

Four In Blue is a 1969 album by the Motown R&B group the Miracles, issued on the label's Tamla Records subsidiary (Tamla 297) in the U.S., and the Tamla-Motown label elsewhere in the world, (STML 11151).

It was the final Miracles album of the 1960s. It reached #78 on the Billboard 200 pop album chart, and reached the Top 10 of Billboard's R&B Album chart, peaking at #3, despite the fact that no singles were released from this album in the U.S. or the UK.

The album takes its name from the blue silk tuxedos that The Miracles (Bobby Rogers, Pete Moore, Smokey Robinson and Ronnie White), wear on its cover. Although not on the cover, Miracles members Claudette Robinson and Marv Tarplin also contributed to this album.

The album is a combination of cover versions and original material, written by the Miracles' lead singer Smokey Robinson and Motown staff songwriters, such as Al Cleveland, Terry Johnson, Holland–Dozier–Holland, Deke Richards, Ashford & Simpson and Richard Morris. Cover songs in this collection included The Beatles' "Hey Jude", The Supremes' "My World Is Empty Without You", The Righteous Brothers' "You've Lost That Lovin' Feelin" and the Messengers' "California Soul".

The album was released on CD in 2001 in a two-in-one set with the Miracles' album, Time Out for Smokey Robinson & The Miracles. The CD release contains an alternative mix of "Don't Say You Love Me" which contains finished background vocals.

== Track listing ==
Side one

1. "You Send Me (With Your Good Lovin')" (Al Cleveland, Terry "Buzzy" Johnson, Smokey Robinson)
2. "Dreams Dreams" (Robinson, Cleveland)
3. "Tomorrow Is Another Day" (Deke Richards, Beatrice Verdi)
4. "Hey Jude" (John Lennon, Paul McCartney)
5. "California Soul" (Nickolas Ashford, Valerie Simpson)
6. "A Legend in Its Own Time" (Robinson)

Side two

1. "You've Lost That Lovin' Feelin'" (Barry Mann, Phil Spector, Cynthia Weil)
2. "We Can Make It We Can" (Ashford, Simpson)
3. "When Nobody Cares" (Robinson)
4. "Don't Say You Love Me" (Richard Morris)
5. "Wish I Knew" (Debbie Dean, Richards)
6. "My World Is Empty Without You" (Brian Holland, Lamont Dozier, Eddie Holland)

== Personnel ==
=== The Miracles ===
- Smokey Robinson – lead vocals
- Claudette Robinson – backing vocals
- Pete Moore – backing vocals
- Bobby Rogers – backing vocals
- Ronnie White – backing vocals
- Marv Tarplin – guitar

== Other musicians ==
- The Funk Brothers – instrumentation

== Charts ==
Chart (1969)	Peak position
US Billboard 200	78
