= The Smokey Robinson Show =

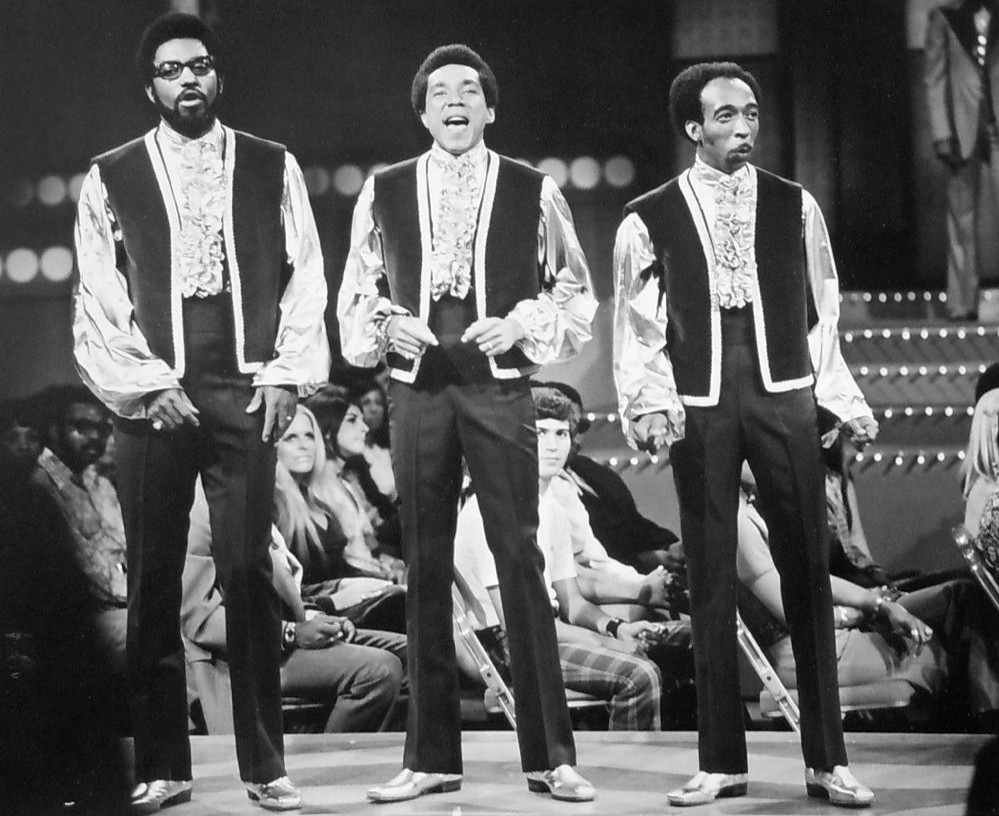
The Miracles performing on The Smokey Robinson Show, a 1970 ABC Television special. (L-to-R) Bobby Rogers, Smokey Robinson, Ronnie White.

The Smokey Robinson Show was a 1970 musical variety special starring Smokey Robinson & The Miracles. It aired on ABC on December 18, 1970, and featured guest stars The Supremes, The Temptations, Stevie Wonder, and Las Vegas singer/performer and actress Fran Jeffries. The program was sponsored by Faberge and was produced by Screen Gems. The director was Kip Walton.

Filmed at the height of success of Motown Records, this special was intended a launching pad for Smokey Robinson's solo career and to prepare the public for his departure from the Miracles. However, the success of The Miracles' 1970 number 1 hit "The Tears of a Clown" delayed his departure for another 2 years. Miracle Pete Moore was absent from the special, having been sidelined by a leg injury, and Claudette Robinson, another Miracle, did not appear on the special. Miracle Marv Tarplin was present, but did not appear on camera. Thus, the only Miracles visible were Smokey Robinson, Ronnie White, and Bobby Rogers, who began the show with their 1963 Top 10 hit "Mickey's Monkey" at the show's intro, and followed up with a medley of three of their biggest hits, "More Love", "If You Can Want", and "I Second That Emotion".

== Other performances ==
This hit-filled special featured the following performances:

- The Temptations sang and performed their then-current hit single, "Ball of Confusion", then joined Robinson on one of the hit songs he wrote for them, "Get Ready".
- The Supremes sang their first post-Diana Ross hit, "Up the Ladder to the Roof".
- Stevie Wonder performed his hit "My Cherie Amour" .
- Fran Jeffries sang and performed "Something's Coming On", and then shared vocals with Robinson and Wonder on his hit, "Signed, Sealed, Delivered I'm Yours".
- Robinson sang a medley of The Beatles' hit "Something" and the Chris Kenner song "Something You Got", made a hit by Chuck Jackson and Maxine Brown, which appeared on the Miracles' 1970 album, A Pocket Full of Miracles, and then joined the rest of the Miracles in a rendition of The Impressions' "People Get Ready".
- In a "Motown Memories" segment, the Miracles and the entire cast sat around reminiscing about Motown's early days, and did a "hits tribute" to Robinson and his composed songs for The Miracles and other Motown acts. Almost all of these songs were co-written by the other members of the Miracles, Bobby Rogers, Pete Moore, Ronnie White, and Marv Tarplin.
- The entire cast joined in for the show's finale, with the Miracles at center stage, singing and performing Gladys Knight & the Pips' Motown hit, "Friendship Train".

== Complete list of performances ==
1. . Intro 2:21-The Miracles-Mickey's Monkey
2. . Smokey Robinson & The Miracles - Hits Medley: 4:27
3. · If You Can Want
4. · More Love
5. · I Second That Emotion
1. . The Supremes - Up the Ladder to the Roof 3:35
2. . The Supremes & Smokey Robinson - Someday We'll Be Together 4:05
1. . Stevie Wonder - Medley: 5:48
2. · My Cherie Amour
3. · Signed, Sealed, Delivered I'm Yours
1. . Fran Jeffries - Something's Coming On 3:15
2. . Stevie Wonder, Smokey Robinson & Fran Jeffries - For Once in My Life 2:36
1. . The Temptations - Ball Of Confusion (That's What The World Is Today) 4:13
2. . The Temptations & Smokey Robinson - Get Ready 4:07
1. . Smokey Robinson Tribute song Medley: 6:35
2. · The Miracles & The Temptations - Special Occasion
3. · Stevie Wonder - My Girl
4. · The Supremes - My Guy
5. · Dennis Edwards - It's Growing
6. · Fran Jeffries & Eddie Kendricks - Shop Around
7. · The Miracles - Ain't That Peculiar
8. · Stevie Wonder - I'll Be Doggone
9. · The Supremes - Don't Mess With Bill
10. · The Temptations - The Way You Do The Things You Do
11. · Fran Jeffries - Ooo Baby Baby
12. The Miracles - Since I Lost My Baby
13. · Fran Jeffries - You've Really Got A Hold On Me
14. · Entire cast - What Love Has Joined Together
1. . Smokey Robinson - Something 4:45
1. . Closing Medley: 7:38
2. · The Temptations - What The World Needs Now Is Love
3. · Fran Jeffries - People Got To Be Free
4. · Stevie Wonder - Walk A Mile In My Shoes
5. · The Supremes - Save the Country
6. · Smokey Robinson & The Miracles - People Get Ready
7. · Entire Cast - Friendship Train

== Cast ==
The Miracles:

- Smokey Robinson
- Bobby Rogers
- Ronnie White

The Supremes:

- Mary Wilson
- Cindy Birdsong
- Jean Terrell

Stevie Wonder

The Temptations:

- Paul Williams
- Eddie Kendricks
- Melvin Franklin
- Otis Williams
- Dennis Edwards

Fran Jeffries

Note: There has never been an official Motown DVD release of this special, but copies of it have been circulating in the "collectors market" for years, and are available on the internet.

Motown Records never released a soundtrack album of this special.

As of May 1, 2017, this special is being broadcast on Get TV.
