= Special Occasion =

Special occasion can refer to one of the following:

- A festive event
- Special Occasion (Miracles album), a 1968 album by Motown group Smokey Robinson & the Miracles
  - Special Occasion (Miracles song) The title song from that album.
- Special Occasion (Bobby Valentino album), a 2007 album by R&B singer Bobby Valentino

== See also ==
- Event (disambiguation)
