= Here I Go Again (The Miracles song) =

- German release picture sleeve

Single by Smokey Robinson & The Miracles

from the album Time Out for Smokey Robinson & The Miracles
- A-side: "Doggone Right"
- Released: May 1969
- Genre: Soul/pop
- Length: 3:00
- Label: Tamla; T 54183
- Songwriters: Smokey Robinson; Warren "Pete" Moore; Terry Johnson; Al Cleveland
- Producers: Warren Moore; Terry Johnson

Smokey Robinson & The Miracles singles chronology
"Baby, Baby Don't Cry" (1968)	"Here I Go Again" / "Doggone Right" (1969)	"Abraham, Martin & John" (1969)

"Here I Go Again" was a 1969 hit single by The Miracles. It was written by Miracles members Smokey Robinson and Pete Moore, along with Motown staff songwriters Al Cleveland and Terry "Buzzy" Johnson, a member of the R&B group The Flamingos.

The song was released on Motown Records' Tamla label subsidiary. It was taken from their top-25 pop album Time Out for Smokey Robinson & The Miracles from that year, and was the "B" side of their hit single, "Doggone Right". "Here I Go Again" was performed by the group on a 1969 telecast of the ABC music-variety program, The Music Scene.

The original Miracles version appears on several of their "Greatest Hits" anthologies, with a live version appearing on their live album, Smokey Robinson & The Miracles: 1957-1972. The Miracles can also be seen performing "Here I Go Again" live on the DVD compilation, Music Scene - The Best of 1969-70 (an out of print collection, but still available on certain collectors' websites).

== Background ==
Moore and Johnson were the song's producers. A heart-rending ballad, Robinson, as the song's narrator, portrays a man falling deeply and hopelessly in love with a young woman, yet afraid to do so due to a bad previous relationship that ended in heartbreak and failure:

"My heart said to me ... don't walk head-on into misery ... Hey, with your eyes wide open, Can't you see ... A hurt's in store ... Just like before..."

In the end, however, love wins out, outweighing his fears and apprehensions:

"Here I Go Again... walking into love... never thinking of the danger that might exist... disregarding all of this just for you..."

Cash Box described it as "very slow" and "shimmery" and "exquisitely produced and tailored to the soft-soul sounds."

== Personnel: The Miracles ==
- Smokey Robinson – lead vocal, co-writer
- Claudette Rogers Robinson – backing vocal
- Pete Moore – backing vocal, co-writer, co-producer
- Ronnie White – backing vocal
- Bobby Rogers – backing vocal
- Marv Tarplin – guitar

== Other personnel ==
- Other instruments by The Funk Brothers

== Chart performance ==
"Here I Go Again" was also a Top 40 hit on the Billboard Hot 100, peaking at number 37. It was a Top 20 hit on the R&B chart as well, peaking at number 15.

== Cover versions ==
- Chazz Dixon
- Carey Bell
- A.J. De Bravo,
- Little Willie G.
- Oran "Juice" Jones
