= A Pocket Full of Miracles =

Studio album by Smokey Robinson & The Miracles
- Released: September 30, 1970
- Recorded: 1970
- Genre: Soul
- Length: 42:28
- Labels: Tamla; TS-306
- Producers: Smokey Robinson; Ashford & Simpson

Smokey Robinson & The Miracles chronology
What Love Has...Joined Together (1969)	A Pocket Full of Miracles (1970)	The Season for Miracles (1970)

Singles from A Pocket Full Of Miracles
- 1. "Point It Out" Released: November 18, 1969; 2. "Who's Gonna Take the Blame" Released: April 28, 1970

Professional ratings
Review scores
Source	Rating
AllMusic	2.5/5 stars

A Pocket Full of Miracles (TS306) is a 1970 album by Motown Records R&B group The Miracles, (AKA "Smokey Robinson & The Miracles") issued on its Tamla subsidiary label, one of three albums the group released that year. This album charted at #56 on the Billboard pop albums chart, and reached the top ten of the magazine's R&B albums chart, peaking at #10 (one of eleven Miracles albums that reached the top ten of that chart). It was released on September 30 of that year. Hit singles on the album included "Point It Out" and the topical Ashford & Simpson written-and-produced song "Who's Gonna Take the Blame", a sad, dark song about a girl that is turned out as a prostitute (unusually serious lyric content for The Miracles). Also included is the charting flip side "Darling Dear", B-side of "Point It Out", which reached #100 on the Billboard pop chart, and spawned a cover version by The Jackson Five.

The album's name takes its title from the 1961 Frank Capra comedy film Pocketful of Miracles. However, that is where the similarities end. Its cover depicts four of The Miracles, Smokey Robinson, Bobby Rogers, Pete Moore, and Ronnie White, sitting inside a huge cartoon "pocket", (thus the name 'Pocket Full of Miracles'). Other original songs in the collection included "Flower Girl", the powerful potential hit "Backfire" (that was not released as a single), and the melancholy "The Reel of Time". Miracles members Marv Tarplin and Claudette Robinson are featured on the songs "You've Got the Love I Need" (a ballad with rock overtones) and "Don't Take It So Hard", respectively. However, they are not featured on the album's cover (apparently because the "pocket" would then have too many Miracles). Covers include versions of Simon and Garfunkel's "Bridge over Troubled Water", Chuck Jackson and Maxine Brown's "Something You Got", included in a medley with The Beatles' "Something", and Smokey's composition for The Temptations, "Get Ready", which features an arrangement borrowed from the Cream hit "Sunshine of Your Love". Motown staff songwriters contributing to this project included Ashford & Simpson, William "Mickey" Stevenson, Horgay Gordy, Robert Gordy, Robert Jones, and Miracles members Smokey Robinson, Pete Moore, and Marv Tarplin.

This album, like several of The Miracles' post-1969 albums, has never been released in the CD format. It was re-released in edited form a few years later, by the defunct independent label Pickwick International, under license from Motown, with a different cover, and the modified name Pocketful.

== Track listing ==
=== Side one ===
1. "Flower Girl" (Smokey Robinson, Pete Moore, Marv Tarplin)
2. "Who's Gonna Take the Blame" (Nick Ashford, Valerie Simpson)
3. "Darling Dear" (Horgay Gordy, Robert Gordy, Allen Story)
4. "You've Got the Love I Need" (Robinson, Robert Jones)
5. "Get Ready" (Robinson)
6. "Bridge Over Troubled Water"* (Paul Simon)

=== Side two ===
1. "Something/Something You Got"* (George Harrison)
2. "Point It Out" (Robinson, Tarplin, Al Cleveland)
3. "Don't Take It So Hard" (Terry Johnson, Charles Johnson, Willie Schofield)
4. "Backfire" (Robinson, Cleveland, Johnny Bristol)
5. "The Reel of Time"* (Janie Bradford, Jack Goga)
6. "Wishful Thinking" (Marv Johnson)
- *(deleted from the Pickwick re-release).

== Personnel ==
=== The Miracles ===
- Bill "Smokey" Robinson – lead vocals
- Claudette Rodgers Robinson – soprano vocals
- Robert "Bobby" Rodgers – tenor vocals
- Ronald "Ronnie" White – baritone vocals
- Warren "Pete" Moore – bass vocals
- Marvin "Marv" Tarplin – guitar

=== Other Credits ===
- The Funk Brothers – instrumentation
