= Sweet Charity (1986 Broadway cast recording) =

Sweet Charity – Original Broadway Cast

Cast recording by the original Broadway cast
- Released: 1986
- Label: EMI America
- Producer: Cy Coleman

Sweet Charity, subtitled Original Broadway Cast, is an album containing a recording of the 1966 Broadway musical Sweet Charity made by its 1986 Broadway revival cast, with Debbie Allen in the title role. The album was released by EMI America.

== Critical reception ==
Professional ratings
Review scores
Source	Rating
AllMusic	3.5/5 stars

In his retrospective review for AllMusic, William Ruhlmann notes that in the 1986 production, Debbie Allen "was not able to put her stamp on the [title] role as Verdon had" but her "shortcomings are less noticeable than the musical revisions to the score enacted by composer and album co-producer Cy Coleman" who "attempts to inject a 1980s sound into his music". He opines that several songs now sound like new songs and concludes: "These alterations do not improve the score, and the original Broadway cast album remains the one to own."

== Track listing ==
LP – EMI America SV-17196

All lyrics are written by Dorothy Fields; all music is composed by Cy Coleman.

Side 1
No.	Title	Artist(s)	Length
1.	"Overture"	Instrumental	3:01
2.	"You Should See Yourself"	Debbie Allen	2:15
3.	"Big Spender"	Bebe Neuwirth, Allison Williams, Fan-Dango Girls	4:03
4.	"Rich Man's Frug"; A. "The Aloof"; B. "Big Finish"	Instrumental	3:42
5.	"If My Friends Could See Me Now"	Debbie Allen	2:46
6.	"Too Many Tomorrows"	Mark Jacoby	2:46
7.	"There's Gotta Be Something Better than This"	Debbie Allen, Bebe Neuwirth, Allison Williams	4:58

Side 2
No.	Title	Artist(s)	Length
1.	"I'm the Bravest Individual"	Debbie Allen, Michael Rupert
2.	"Rhythm of Life"	Irving Allen Lee, Tanis Michaels, Stanley Wesley Perryman & Worshipers
3.	"Baby Dream Your Dream"	Bebe Neuwirth & Allison Williams
4.	"Sweet Charity"	Michael Rupert
5.	"Where Am I Going?"	Debbie Allen
6.	"I'm a Brass Band"	Debbie Allen & Her Brass Band
7.	"I Love to Cry at Weddings"	Lee Wilkoff, Tom Wierney, Bebe Neuwirth, Allison Williams, Girls & Patrons
8.	"And She Lived Hopefully Ever After" (Charley's Theme)	Instrumental
9.	"If My Friends Could See Me Now" (Bows)	Entire Company	0:47

== Awards ==
Year	Award type	Categories	Results	Ref.
1987	Grammy Awards	Best Musical Cast Show Album	Nominated	
