= Doggone Right =

- Dutch release picture sleeve

Single by Smokey Robinson & The Miracles

from the album Time Out for Smokey Robinson & The Miracles
- B-side: "Here I Go Again"
- Released: May 28, 1969
- Genre: Soul/pop
- Length: 2:56
- Label: Tamla; T 54183
- Songwriter(s): Smokey Robinson; Marv Tarplin; Al Cleveland
- Producer(s): Smokey Robinson

Smokey Robinson & The Miracles singles chronology
"Baby, Baby Don't Cry" (1968)	"Doggone Right" / "Here I Go Again" (1969)	"Abraham, Martin & John" (1969)

"Doggone Right" is a 1969 single recorded by The Miracles (aka Smokey Robinson & The Miracles) for the Tamla label. Written by Miracles members Smokey Robinson and Marv Tarplin along with Motown staff songwriter Al Cleveland and produced by Robinson, the single peaked at number 32 on the Billboard Hot 100 in the United States. It was also a Top 10 R&B hit, peaking at #7. "Doggone Right" was the A-side to the double-sided Miracles' hit single, Tamla T54183. "Here I Go Again", contrary to popular belief, was the "B" side, although both sides charted within the top 40 of the Hot 100.

== Background ==
Smokey Robinson sings the main lead vocal on the song. Miracles bass singer, Warren "Pete" Moore, has got also a lead on the part where he echos "Doggone right", first sung by the group. The song's lyrics relate that, when the narrator feels down, his girl will cheer him up. The narrator also tells that he would be true to his girl if she would accept his love.

== Credits and personnel ==
=== The Miracles ===
- Lead vocals: Smokey Robinson, Pete Moore
- Background vocals: Claudette Robinson, Ronnie White, Bobby Rogers, Pete Moore
- Guitarist: Marv Tarplin
- Other Instrumentation: The Funk Brothers

== Chart performance ==
Chart (1969)	Peak position
US Billboard Hot 100	32
US Best Selling Rhythm & Blues Singles (Billboard)	7

== Television appearances ==
- As befitting an "A" side recording, The Miracles premiered this song for national television audiences on a 1969 telecast of The Ed Sullivan Show, marking their second appearance on the program.
