= Yester Love =

Single by Smokey Robinson & the Miracles

from the album Special Occasion
- B-side: "Much Better Off"
- Released: May 13, 1968
- Recorded: Hitsville USA (Studio A): December 18, 1967
- Genre: Soul/pop
- Length: 2:16
- Label: Tamla; T 54167
- Songwriters: Smokey Robinson; Al Cleveland
- Producer: Smokey Robinson

Smokey Robinson & the Miracles singles chronology
"If You Can Want" (1967)	"Yester Love" (1968)	"Special Occasion" (1968)

Music video
- Listen to "Yester Love" on YouTube

"Yester Love" (Tamla 54167) was a 1968 song by American vocal group The Miracles (aka "Smokey Robinson" and The Miracles) on its Tamla subsidiary label. It was recorded on December 18, 1967 (released on May 13, 1968), and was included on the group's 1968 album Special Occasion. Composed by Miracles lead singer Smokey Robinson, and Motown staff songwriter Al Cleveland and produced by Robinson, the song was a US Billboard top 40 pop hit, peaking at No. 31, and a top 10 R&B hit as well, peaking at No. 9. It also reached No. 24 on the US Cash Box Top 100. In Canada, the song reached No. 28.

== Composition ==
A mid-tempo song, instead of the usual ballad, a trademark of The Miracles, this tune is a sad lament about a lost love, the theme of many Miracles' songs. The song's title, "Yester Love", is a shortened form of "Yesterday Love", or "Love of Yesterday", indicating the relationship has now ended. Smokey, as the song's narrator, portrays a heartbroken man, reminiscing about a once-happy relationship with his girl, with promise of a future, that ended in failure, with his wondering just how it got there:

"Yesterday, we made future plans....
She loved me, I could tell...
Can today be that tomorrow...
That we planned so well...

Yester Baby, I'll never forget her...
Though tomorrow might bring me one better...
Today, I go my way, dreaming of my Yester love..."

During the song, Smokey, ever the master poet, also explains the meaning of his use of the term "Yester", in his usual fashion:

"Yester is.....
The Prefix that we fix
To things that have gone by...
Forever, they say...."

Miracle Marv Tarplin's outstanding guitar work is evident throughout, and is actually the last thing the listener hears as the song draws to a close. During the song, Miracles Claudette Robinson, cousin Bobby Rogers, Ronnie White, and Pete Moore, project sympathetic background vocals to Smokey's lead, with Claudette's voice clearly audible in the chorus.

"Yester Love" was released during 1968, a period during which The Miracles, a normally guaranteed Top 20 and occasional Top 10 group, were undergoing an inexplicable chart decline, along with many of Motown's other top groups, including The Supremes. This trend was soon reversed by the Top 10 success of their hit "Baby, Baby Don't Cry" in spring 1969.

"Yester Love" has inspired a cover version by Gerald Wilson and his Orchestra, and has been included in several Miracles "Greatest Hits" anthologies. Taken from the same album, the song's "B" side, "Much Better Off", like many Miracles "B" sides, was also a popular regional hit, and inspired a cover version by late rapper J Dilla.

== Critical reception ==
Cash Box called the song a "gem," stating that it is a "percolating rhythmic workout" with "tender blues vocals."

== Personnel — The Miracles ==
- Smokey Robinson - lead vocals
- Pete Moore - bass vocals
- Claudette Rogers-Robinson - soprano vocals
- Ronnie White - baritone vocals
- Bobby Rogers - tenor vocals
- Marv Tarplin -guitar

== Other personnel ==
- The Funk Brothers

== Bibliography ==
Smokey Robinson & The Miracles: The 35th Anniversary Collection (The Miracles' Discography, p. 61)
