= Point out =

Point out means to show someone who a person is or where something is. Point out also means to tell someone something that they need to know. It is used in the names of:

== Point out ==
=== Sport ===
- Three-Point Shootout, a National Basketball Association

=== Music ===
- Point It Out, a 1969 recording by Motown Records
