= Sweet Charity (soundtrack) =

Sweet Charity – The Original Sound Track Album of The Musical Motion Picture of the '70's

Soundtrack album by various artists
- Released: 1969
- Label: Decca

Sweet Charity is the original soundtrack to the 1969 motion picture Sweet Charity which was released by Decca Records in the same year. The album reached the charts in the United States and Australia, and received several positive reviews from critics.

== Background ==
The musical's creative team substantially revised it for the film: Cy Coleman co-wrote two new songs – "My Personal Property" and "It's a Nice Face" – with Dorothy Fields and adapted the song "Sweet Charity" to a new melody. Moreover, four songs – "You Should See Yourself", "Too Many Tomorrows", "I'm the Bravest Individual" and "Baby Dream Your Dream" – are absent from the film adaptation.

== Critical reception ==
Professional ratings
Review scores
Source	Rating
AllMusic	3/5 stars

Gene Lees at High Fidelity stated that Sweet Charity "contains some great songs and that makes his album infinitely more commendable than most show score recordings." He added, "Cy Coleman has a capacity to get wit into music that isn't equaled by anybody I can think of who's writing for the theater today. And Dorothy Fields, one of our most skillful lyricists, whose career has been long and distinguished, works beautifully with him."

In his retrospective review for AllMusic, William Ruhlmann notes that the soundtrack version of the musical was "substantially shorter than the Original Broadway Cast album" – as a result of four songs having been deleted, — and "far less complete". But what is "far more problematic", he continues, is that "the outstanding Gwen Verdon, for whom the show was created, was replaced on-screen by the only adequate, but supposedly bankable Shirley MacClaine [sic]". "The soundtrack album is vastly inferior to the Original Broadway Cast album," he concludes.

Neverheless, Ruhlmann also notes that even though the film "was a bomb at the box office", "it has come to be a cult favorite because it shows off choreography by director Bob Fosse."

== Chart performance ==
The album reached number 72 on the Billboard's Top LPs chart.

== Track listing ==
LP – Decca DL 71502

All lyrics are written by Dorothy Fields; all music is composed by Cy Coleman.

Side 1
No.	Title	Note(s) / Artist(s)	Length
1.	"Overture" {a) "Big Spender" {b) "It's a Nice Face" {c) "Sweet Charity" {d) "Where Am I Going?" {e) "I'm a Brass Band"	Instrumental – Orchestra
2.	"My Personal Property"	Shirley MacLaine
3.	"Big Spender"	Ballroom Girls
4.	"The Pompeii Club" (Rich Man's Frug)	Instrumental – Orchestra
5.	"If My Friends Could See Me Now"	Shirley MacLaine
6.	"There's Gotta Be Something Better than This"	Shirley MacLaine, Chita Rivera and Paula Kelly
7.	"It's a Nice Face"	Shirley MacLaine

Side 2
No.	Title	Artist(s)	Length
1.	"Rhythm of Life"	Sammy Davis and Ensemble
2.	"Sweet Charity"	John McMartin
3.	"I'm a Brass Band"	Shirley MacLaine
4.	"I Love to Cry at Weddings"	Stubby Kaye and Ensemble
5.	"Where Am I Going?"	Shirley MacLaine
6.	"Finale: Sweet Charity" (Rebirth)	Instrumental – Orchestra

== Charts ==
Chart (1969–1970)	Peak position
Australia (Kent Music Report)	13
US Billboard Top LPs	72
