= George Kirby (comedian) =

Comedian, actor, singer (1923–1995)

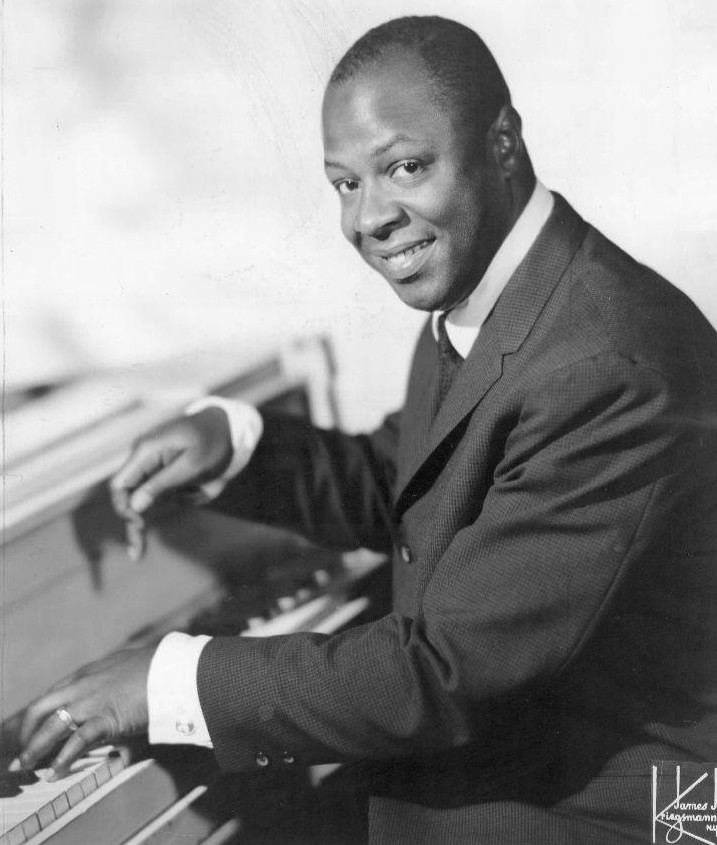
- Kirby in 1964
- Born: June 8, 1923; Chicago, Illinois, U.S.
- Died: September 30, 1995 (aged 72); Las Vegas, Nevada, U.S.
- Spouse: Rosemary (1960–1995)

George Kirby (June 8, 1923 – September 30, 1995) was an American comedian, singer, and actor.

== Career ==
Born in Chicago, Kirby broke into show business in the 1940s at the Club DeLisa, a South Side establishment that employed a variety-show format and preferred to hire local singers, dancers, and comedians. His first recording was as a stand-up blues singer, performing "Ice Man Blues" on a Tom Archia session done in 1947 for Aristocrat Records.

He was one of the first African-American comedians to appeal to white as well as Black audiences during the height of the Civil Rights era, appearing between 1963 and 1972 on Perry Como's Kraft Music Hall, The Ed Sullivan Show, The Dean Martin Show, The Jackie Gleason Show, The Temptations Show, Rowan and Martin's Laugh-In, and The Tonight Show Starring Johnny Carson. In the mid 1950s, Sammy Davis had broken ground doing impressions of White celebrities, leading the way for this to become more socially acceptable. As a gifted impressionist, Kirby didn't mimick solely contemporary Black stars like Bill Cosby and Pearl Bailey. He also did impressions of White celebrities such as John Wayne and Walter Brennan, something still ostensibly provocative in the 1960s. Kirby was also a bebop piano player and did song and vocal impressions of jazz greats Louis Armstrong, Nat King Cole, Ella Fitzgerald, and Joe Williams. He did a profoundly believable female and child voice, as well as an array of military and airline sound effects.

In 1970, he was allowed to produce The George Kirby Show, a television special, to gauge whether he could attract an audience for a weekly series. It led to his hosting Half the George Kirby Comedy Hour, a sketch comedy and variety show, which lasted for 22 episodes in 1972; it was one of the actor-comedian Steve Martin's first credits in front of the camera. The series was in many ways an uneasy compromise between Kirby's natural gifts and what the public would accept of Black actors at the time; a regular feature was a shaggy dog story entitled the "Funky Fable". He was also a regular in the ABC series The Kopykats, with other impressionists such as Rich Little, Charlie Callas, Marilyn Michaels, and Frank Gorshin.

Following the demise of his show, Kirby's career declined, especially as audiences began to look for more cutting-edge comedy. HBO did include him in their On Location With comedian series in the late 1970s, filming one of his many appearances at Grossinger's in the NY Catskills, a club he had played regularly since 1961.

His career never again reached its former heights, but he did register featured guest appearances on Gimme a Break! with Nell Carter, What's Happening Now!!, Crazy Like a Fox, and 227. In 1983 he did a USO tour with Bob Hope to entertain the troops in Beirut, Lebanon as part of the multinational peacekeeping force.

== Imprisonment ==
Arrested in 1977 for selling cocaine and heroin to an undercover officer, Kirby served three and a half years in prison. After his release, he visited schools to tell students to stay off drugs.

== Death ==
Diagnosed with Parkinson's disease in his later years, Kirby made his last public appearance at an all-star benefit in May 1995 given by his friends for his mounting medical bills.

On September 30, 1995, Kirby died of Parkinson's disease at a nursing home in Las Vegas. He was survived by his wife, Rosemary.
