= Puzzle People =

Studio album by The Temptations
- Released: September 23, 1969
- Recorded: October 1968 – July 1969
- Genre: Psychedelic soul; soul; funk
- Length: 43:37
- Label: Gordy; GS 949
- Producer: Norman Whitfield

The Temptations chronology
The Temptations Show (1969)	Puzzle People (1969)	Together (1969)

Professional ratings
Review scores
Source	Rating
AllMusic	3/5 stars
Rolling Stone	(favourable)

Puzzle People is the eleventh studio album released by American soul quintet The Temptations for the Gordy (Motown) label in 1969. Produced entirely by Norman Whitfield, Puzzle People expanded on the psychedelic soul sound of the Temptations' previous LP, Cloud Nine. Although a few straightforward soul ballads are present, the album is primarily composed of Sly & the Family Stone/James Brown-derived proto-funk tracks such as the lead single "Don't Let the Joneses Get You Down", and the number-one Billboard Pop hit "I Can't Get Next to You".

Puzzle People was released simultaneously with Together, a duets album of covers by the Temptations and labelmates Diana Ross & the Supremes. It peaked into the Top 5 on the Billboard Pop Albums chart, and spent fifteen weeks at number one on the R&B Albums chart.

== Track listing ==
All selections produced by Norman Whitfield.

Side one
No.	Title	Writer(s)	Leads(s)	Length
1.	"I Can't Get Next to You"	Norman Whitfield, Barrett Strong	Edwards, Franklin, Kendricks, P. Williams, O. Williams	2:55
2.	"Hey Jude"	John Lennon, Paul McCartney	Edwards, Kendricks, P. Williams, Franklin, O. Williams	3:32
3.	"Don't Let the Joneses Get You Down"	Whitfield, Strong	Edwards, Franklin, Kendricks, P. Williams, O. Williams	4:45
4.	"Message from a Black Man"	Whitfield, Strong	Kendricks, Edwards, Franklin	6:02
5.	"It's Your Thing"	Ronald Isley, O'Kelly Isley, Rudolph Isley	Edwards, P. Williams	3:13

Side two
No.	Title	Writer(s)	Leads(s)	Length
1.	"Little Green Apples"	Bobby Russell	P. Williams	3:45
2.	"You Don't Love Me No More"	Whitfield, Strong, Roger Penzabene	Kendricks	2:35
3.	"Since I've Lost You"	Whitfield	Edwards, Franklin	2:43
4.	"Running Away (Ain't Gonna Help You)"	Whitfield, Strong	P. Williams	2:48
5.	"That's the Way Love Is"	Whitfield, Strong	Edwards, P. Williams	3:20
6.	"Slave"	Whitfield, Strong	Edwards, Kendricks, Franklin	7:30

== Personnel ==
The Temptations

- Dennis Edwards - tenor/baritone vocals
- Eddie Kendricks - first tenor/falsetto vocals
- Paul Williams - baritone vocals
- Melvin Franklin - bass vocals
- Otis Williams - second tenor vocals

with:

- Norman Whitfield - producer, songwriter
- Barrett Strong - lyricist
- The Funk Brothers - instrumentation

== Charts ==
Chart (1969)	Peak position
Canadian Albums (RPM)	17
Japanese Albums (Oricon)	82
UK Albums (OCC)	20
US Billboard 200	5

== See also ==
- List of Billboard number-one R&B albums of the 1960s
- List of number-one R&B albums of 1970 (U.S.)
