= The Temptations Show =

Soundtrack album by The Temptations
- Released: July 10, 1969
- Recorded: March 28, 1969
- Genres: Soul, pop
- Length: 42:47
- Labels: Gordy; GS 933
- Producer: Jackie Barnett

The Temptations chronology
Cloud Nine (1969)	The Temptations Show (1969)	Puzzle People (1969)

Professional ratings
Review scores
Source	Rating
AllMusic	3/5 stars

The Temptations Show was a one-hour syndicated television special starring Motown singing group The Temptations, which aired on July 10, 1969. Produced by Motown Productions, it guest-starred George Kirby and Kaye Stevens.

Among the featured musical numbers were Temptations singles such as "Get Ready", "Cloud Nine", and "Run Away Child, Running Wild", pop standards such as "Ol' Man River" and "Swanee"., and a closing number, "Somebody's Keepin' Score", featuring an (early) "rap" by all three stars. Along with the TCB special in 1968, which featured both the Temptations and Diana Ross & The Supremes, this was one of Dennis Edwards' first appearances with the group. A soundtrack of the show was released on Motown's Gordy label as GS 933 that same year. The soundtrack was also issued on 8-Track GOR-8-1933

== Track listing ==
Side one
No.	Title	Length
1.	"Opening - Get Ready"	2:43
2.	"Medley: Girl (Why You Wanna Make Me Blue) / Beauty is Only Skin Deep / You're My Everything / My Girl / Ain't Too Proud to Beg"	5:05
3.	"Temptations Introduction"	0:35
4.	"I've Got To Be Me"	2:33
5.	"Cloud Nine"	3:07
6.	"For Once in My Life" (with Kaye Stevens)	2:55
7.	"Try It Baby" (with Kaye Stevens)	2:40
8.	"When I Lay My Burdens Down" (with George Kirby)	6:12

Side two
No.	Title	Length
1.	"Medley: The Best Things In Life Are Free / Life"	2:03
2.	"Monologue And Medley: Ol' Man River / Swanee / Old Folks"	5:11
3.	"Comedy Routine: Hello, Young Lovers / Cloud Nine / If I Didn't Care" (with George Kirby)	5:09
4.	"Runaway Child, Running Wild"	3:04
5.	"Finale: Somebody's Keepin' Score" (with Kaye Stevens & George Kirby)	3:25
