= Nightlife (talk show) =

American syndicated late-night talk show

- Nightlife intertitle
- Also known as: Nightlife Starring David Brenner with Billy Preston
- Genre: Talk show Variety show
- Presented by: David Brenner
- Announcer: Dan Ingram
- Music by: Billy Preston and the Nightlife Band
- Country of origin: United States
- Original language: English
- No. of seasons: 1
- No. of episodes: 195

Production
- Producer: Bob Tischler
- Production locations: Unitel Video Studios; East 76th Street; New York City
- Running time: 30 minutes
- Production companies: Motown Productions; King World Productions

Original release
- Network: First-run syndication
- Release: September 8, 1986 – June 19, 1987

Nightlife is an American syndicated late-night talk show hosted by comedian David Brenner that aired weeknights from September 8, 1986, to June 19, 1987. Produced by Motown Productions in association with King World Productions, the half-hour program was taped in New York City and featured Billy Preston as musical director and leader of the house band.

The series premiered on 102 stations as a syndicated alternative to established network late-night programs. Its ratings declined during the season, and production ended after one season and 195 episodes.

== History ==
=== Background ===
In early 1986, Nightlife was pitched to stations at the annual National Association of Television Program Executives convention as a syndicated late-night alternative to NBC's The Tonight Show Starring Johnny Carson and Late Night with David Letterman.

After making his national television debut on The Tonight Show Starring Johnny Carson in 1971, Brenner became one of the program's most frequent guests, making 158 appearances. He also guest-hosted for Johnny Carson 75 times between 1975 and 1984.

Unlike Joan Rivers, whose competing Fox series The Late Show premiered the following month, Brenner discussed his plans with Johnny Carson before launching Nightlife and said that Carson had given him his blessing.

Produced by Motown Productions in association with King World, the series premiered on September 8, 1986, on 102 stations. About one-third of its initial affiliates were ABC stations.

=== Format ===
Nightlife differed from most late-night talk shows of the period in that it was a half-hour program rather than an hour. Brenner also adopted a more casual appearance than other late-night hosts, frequently wearing sweaters instead of suit jackets. The program often opened with a comedy sketch rather than a traditional monologue.

A notable exception occurred on October 17, 1986, when Brenner delivered an extended monologue that continued through two commercial breaks and lasted until the closing credits. Reports said that none of the scheduled guests had appeared, although Brenner's publicist maintained that the all-monologue program had been intentional.

Preston served as musical director and led the Nightlife Band, receiving billing in the program's title as Nightlife Starring David Brenner with Billy Preston. New York radio personality Dan Ingram was the announcer.

=== Ratings and cancellation ===
During its first two months on the air, Nightlife averaged a 2.4 rating. A November 1986 article in Broadcasting said that the program had "gotten lost in the shuffle over the Carson and Rivers shows." Its rating fell to 1.9 in November, and by January 1987, David Smith, associate director of programming at Katz Communications, said that the series was unlikely to return for a second season.

In April 1987, King World and Motown Productions announced that they would fulfill the program's 195-episode commitment but would end production after the first season. The cancellation was formally confirmed in June. The final original episode aired in June, with reruns continuing through August.

Brenner later said that when the ratings failed to rise quickly, some stations moved the program from the more desirable 11:00 p.m.–midnight period to later time slots. He also said that King World subsequently reduced the show's budget and increased the number of prerecorded episodes. King World executive Michael King said that competition for guests was "somewhat of a problem", but argued that the larger issue was that viewers did not want to watch Brenner every night.

In a 2009 interview, Brenner attributed the show's demise partly to tensions between Motown Productions and King World, saying that the two companies "ended up not liking to work with each other" and lost interest in continuing the series.

=== Reception ===
Critical response to Nightlife was mixed. Steve Daley of the Chicago Tribune found the program overly eclectic, arguing that its combination of comedy, interviews and music did not always cohere. People, however, gave the program a more favorable assessment shortly after its premiere, praising Brenner's relaxed style and describing him as a strong entrant in the increasingly crowded late-night field.

The show's launch coincided with a sharp increase in late-night competition. In addition to The Tonight Show and Late Night with David Letterman, the 1986 season brought Rivers's The Late Show, while ABC was also presenting programs hosted by Dick Cavett and Jimmy Breslin.

=== Legacy ===
Preston's role on Nightlife made him the first African-American musical director of a nationally televised talk show. His work on the series was subsequently noted in accounts of his television career.

The series also provided national television exposure to comedians early in their careers, including Bobby Slayton.

== See also ==
- List of late-night American network TV programs
