= Special Occasion (The Miracles album) =

Studio album by Smokey Robinson & the Miracles
- Released: August 26, 1968
- Recorded: 1966–1968
- Studio: Hitsville USA, Detroit
- Genre: R&B, pop soul
- Length: 32:23
- Label: Tamla; TS-290
- Producer: Smokey Robinson; Norman Whitfield

Smokey Robinson & the Miracles chronology
Greatest Hits, Vol. 2 (1968)	Special Occasion (1968)	Live! (1969)

Singles from Special Occasion
- 1. "If You Can Want" Released: February 8, 1968; 2. "Yester Love" Released: May 13, 1968; 3. "Special Occasion" Released: July 30, 1968

Professional ratings
Review scores
Source	Rating
Allmusic	3/5 stars

Special Occasion is an album by the American group Smokey Robinson & the Miracles, released in 1968 by Tamla Motown. It contains three Top 40 hits: "If You Can Want", "Yester Love", and "Special Occasion". Also included are versions of the Motown hits "I Heard It Through the Grapevine" and "Everybody Needs Love" (both made popular by Gladys Knight & the Pips) and the Beatles' "Yesterday". The album's biggest hit was the uptempo "If You Can Want", which just missed the Billboard Pop Top 10 (peaking at #11), and was performed by the group on their first appearance on The Ed Sullivan Show in 1968. The Miracles were actually the first group to record "I Heard It Through the Grapevine", before the later hit versions by Marvin Gaye and Gladys Knight & the Pips were done, although the master used on this album is a re-recorded version prepared following the release of the Pips' version.

Special Occasion also includes the popular Miracles regional hit "B" sides, "Much Better Off" (which inspired a cover version by late rapper J Dilla), and "Give Her Up". "Give Her Up" first appeared on Martha & the Vandellas' 1963 album Come and Get These Memories as "Give Him Up".

== Track listing ==
=== Side one ===
1. "Yester Love" (Smokey Robinson, Al Cleveland)
2. "If You Can Want" (Robinson)
3. "Special Occasion" (Robinson, Cleveland)
4. "Everybody Needs Love" (Norman Whitfield, Edward Holland, Jr.)
5. "Just Losing You" (William "Mickey" Stevenson)
6. "Give Her Up" (Robinson)

=== Side two ===
1. "I Heard It Through the Grapevine" (Whitfield, Barrett Strong)
2. "Yesterday" (John Lennon, Paul McCartney)
3. "Your Mother's Only Daughter" (Robinson, Cleveland)
4. "Much Better Off" (Smokey Robinson, Warren Moore)
5. "You Only Build Me Up To Tear Me Down" (Robinson)

== Personnel ==
The Miracles

- Smokey Robinson – lead vocals, producer, executive producer
- Ronnie White – background vocals
- Bobby Rogers – background vocals
- Warren "Pete" Moore – background vocals
- Claudette Robinson – background vocals
- Marv Tarplin – guitarist

Additional

- Norman Whitfield, producer ("Everybody Needs Love", "I Heard It Through the Grapevine")
- The Funk Brothers – instrumentation
