= Cream of the Crop =

Studio album by Diana Ross & the Supremes
- Released: November 3, 1969
- Recorded: 1966 ("Blowin' in the Wind"); 1968–1969 (all other tracks)
- Genre: Soul
- Length: 31:40
- Label: Motown
- Producers: Johnny Bristol; Berry Gordy; Smokey Robinson

Diana Ross & the Supremes chronology
Together (1969)	Cream of the Crop (1969)	On Broadway (1969)

Professional ratings
Review scores
Source	Rating
AllMusic	2.5/5 stars

Cream of the Crop is the eighteenth studio album released by Diana Ross & the Supremes for the Motown label. It was the final regular Supremes studio album to feature lead singer Diana Ross. The album was released in November 1969, after the release and rising success of the hit single "Someday We'll Be Together".

== Background ==
"Someday" was originally to have been released as Ross' first solo single (Ross is backed on the recording by session singers Maxine and Julia Waters, not the Supremes). Motown chief Berry Gordy appended the Supremes billing to the single so as to create more publicity for Ross' exit from the group.

Another selection of note is "The Young Folks", the charting B-side of "No Matter What Sign You Are" from Let the Sunshine In, later covered by The Jackson 5. Cream of the Crop also includes covers of songs by The Beatles ("Hey Jude") and Bob Dylan ("Blowin' in the Wind").

The lead #1 single, "Someday We'll Be Together" proved to be a multi-format smash. The album closer, "The Beginning of the End", features Motown artist Syreeta Wright alongside Ross and Supremes members Mary Wilson and Cindy Birdsong. Wright was Berry Gordy's original choice to replace Ross in the Supremes because she had a range and tone similar to Ross. However, Gordy and Supremes manager Shelly Berger decided instead to replace Ross with Jean Terrell, after seeing Terrell perform with her brother Ernie as part of their band, Ernie Terrell & the Heavyweights.

== Reception ==
Its modest Billboard album chart ranking at #33 was as much a reflection on the company's forthcoming focus on Diana Ross' solo debut as it was on the album's content of "second tier" songwriters. Motown had flooded the market with at least 4 new albums in a twelve-month period. Despite sporting a platinum single, sales for Ross's final Supremes studio album were tepid.

== Track listing ==
Side one
No.	Title	Writer(s)	Length
1.	"Someday We'll Be Together"	Johnny Bristol, Harvey Fuqua, Jackey Beavers	3:15
2.	"Can't You See It's Me"	Pam Sawyer, Ivy Jo Hunter, Jack Goga	2:33
3.	"You Gave Me Love"	Bristol, Fuqua, Marv Johnson	2:40
4.	"Hey Jude"	John Lennon, Paul McCartney	2:59
5.	"The Young Folks"	Allen Story, George Gordy	3:13
6.	"Shadows of Society"	Goga, Hunter, Walter Fields	2:59

Side two
No.	Title	Writer(s)	Length
7.	"Loving You Is Better Than Ever"	Smokey Robinson	2:45
8.	"When It's to the Top (Still I Won't Stop Giving You Love)"	Ronald Weatherspoon, James Dean, William Weatherspoon	2:56
9.	"Till Johnny Comes"	Robinson	2:57
10.	"Blowin' in the Wind"	Bob Dylan	2:57
11.	"The Beginning of the End"	Margaret Johnson	2:33

== Personnel ==
- Diana Ross – lead vocals
- Mary Wilson & Cindy Birdsong – background vocals
- Florence Ballard – background vocals on "Blowin' In The Wind"
- Syreeta Wright – background vocals on "The Beginning of the End"
- Julia Waters Tillman, Maxine Waters Willard, & Merry Clayton – background vocals on "Someday We'll Be Together"
- Johnny Bristol – co-lead vocals on "Someday We'll Be Together"
- The Andantes – background vocals
- The Funk Brothers & various Los Angeles area session musicians – instrumentation

== Charts ==
=== Weekly charts ===
Chart (1969–1970)	Peak position
Canada Top Albums/CDs (RPM)	50
UK Albums (Official Charts)	34
US Billboard 200	33
US Top R&B/Hip-Hop Albums (Billboard)	3

=== Year-end charts ===
Chart (1970)	Rank
US Top R&B/Hip-Hop Albums (Billboard)	22
