= Point It Out =

Single by the Miracles

from the album A Pocket Full Of Miracles
- B-side: "Darling Dear"
- Released: November 18, 1969
- Length: 2:38
- Label: Tamla
- Songwriters: Smokey Robinson; Marv Tarplin; Al Cleveland
- Producers: Smokey Robinson, Al Cleveland

The Miracles singles chronology
"Abraham, Martin & John" (1969)	"Point It Out" / "Darling Dear" (1969)	"Who's Gonna Take The Blame" (1969)

"Point It Out" is a song by the American R&B group Smokey Robinson & The Miracles, released in 1969 on Motown's Tamla subsidiary. This mid-tempo song was a national Billboard Top 40 Pop hit, reaching #37 on the Hot 100, and was a Top 10 R&B hit was well, reaching #4. It was taken from their album "A Pocket Full Of Miracles", and was written by Miracles members William "Smokey" Robinson and Marv Tarplin, along with Motown staff songwriter Al Cleveland.

== Background ==
Robinson and Cleveland were the song's producers. It was recorded by the group on September 18, 1969. "Point It Out" has inspired a cover version by The Supremes and The Temptations. As with many Miracles hit tunes, "Point It Out" begins with Miracles member/co-composer Marv Tarplin's guitar, while Robinson, as the song's narrator, explains the sheer joy of being in a new love relationship with a special lady, one so special that he simply can't think of a reason for not loving her:

- "You're the one that I'm crazy for
- And, every day it seems I love you more and more
- Now, if there's a reason why I shouldn't love you
- The way that I do, with a love that is true
- Somebody Point It Out...
- Point It Out to me".

Unlike some Miracles songs, where the background vocalists' voices are partially obscured under the music, Miracles Bobby Rogers, Ronnie White, Pete Moore, and Claudette Rogers Robinson's voices are clearly audible in this song, giving it more of a "group" sound, their tight harmonies adding to the song's overall quality feel, while Robinson's trademark poetry and mastery with wordplay are clearly evident throughout. This song is the closest that The Miracles have come to pure Funk in any of their records.

The song's "B" side, Darling Dear, was also a hit, reaching #100 on the Billboard Pop chart that same year. It has inspired a cover version by The Jackson Five, who in their career, covered many Miracles tunes, including "Who's Lovin' You", "(Come 'Round Here) I'm the One You Need," and "The Love I Saw in You Was Just a Mirage". Both songs have appeared on several Miracles' "Greatest Hits" CD compilations, including their 35th Anniversary Collection box set.

== Chart performance ==
Chart (1969–1970)	Peak position
US Billboard Hot 100	37
US Best Selling Soul Singles (Billboard)	4
