= If You Can Want =

- Dutch release picture sleeve

Single by Smokey Robinson & the Miracles

from the album Special Occasion
- B-side: "When The Words From Your Heart Get Caught Up In Your Throat"
- Released: February 8, 1968
- Recorded: Hitsville USA (Studio A): November 28, 1967
- Genre: Soul/pop
- Length: 2:25
- Label: Tamla; T 54162
- Songwriter: Smokey Robinson
- Producer: Smokey Robinson

Smokey Robinson & the Miracles singles chronology
"I Second That Emotion" (1967)	"If You Can Want" (1968)	"Yester Love" (1968)

"If You Can Want" is a 1968 single recorded by R&B group Smokey Robinson & the Miracles for Motown Records' Tamla label. Written and produced by Miracles lead singer Smokey Robinson, "If You Can Want" was the most successful of the three singles included on the group's 1968 album Special Occasion. This single just missed the U.S. Top 10, peaking at number 11 on the Billboard Hot 100 in the United States, and was a Top 5 R&B hit, peaking at number three on Billboard's R&B singles chart, and was also a minor hit in England, peaking at number 50 on the United Kingdom singles chart.

The song's lyrics portray the narrator as a man in love with a woman who only views him as a casual friend. However, the narrator hopes that the woman will eventually come to appreciate his affections: If you can want, you can need, if you can need, you can care, if you can care, you can love; so if you want me, I'll be there.

A variation of the last line was used in the chorus portion of the Spinners song "I'll Be Around" (1972).

Cash Box called it a "sure-fire hit in this throbbing track loaded with the familiar team sound," saying it had "mid-speed tempo with a hard-hitting ork push and vocals at once fragile and emotionally taut." Record World called it an "infectious ditty."

"If You Can Want" was the group's only major hit in 1968, and was performed by the Miracles on their 1st appearance on The Ed Sullivan Show. Two other releases that year, "Yester Love" and "Special Occasion", missed the Billboard Hot 100's Top 20, beginning a lull in the Miracles' chart performance until the Top 10 success of "Baby, Baby Don't Cry" in spring 1969.

The B-side, "When The Words From Your Heart Get Caught Up In Your Throat", was never released on a Miracles album and was only issued on CD in 1994, on The 35th Anniversary Collection.

== Personnel Credits:The Miracles ==
- Lead vocals by Smokey Robinson
- Background vocals by Claudette Rogers Robinson, Pete Moore, Ronnie White, and Bobby Rogers.
- Guitar by Marv Tarplin

== Other instruments ==
The Funk Brothers

== Cover versions ==
The Miracles' original hit recording of "If You Can Want" has inspired cover versions by the following artists:

- Barbara McNair
- The Dirtbombs
- Chazz Dixon
- Perth County Conspiracy
