= Michael Jackson: The Legend Continues =

- Directed by: Patrick T. Kelly
- Produced by: George Paige
- Starring: Michael Jackson
- Narrated by: James Earl Jones
- Edited by: Glenn A. Morgan
- Production companies: Motown Productions; Optimum Productions
- Release dates: March 12, 1988 (Showtime); May 3, 1989 (United States)
- Running time: 54 minutes
- Country: United States
- Language: English

Michael Jackson: The Legend Continues is a 1988 documentary film about the life and career of Michael Jackson from childhood to the present day. It is directed by Patrick T. Kelly and produced by Motown and narrated by actor James Earl Jones.

It was initially aired as a special on Showtime as Motown On Showtime: Michael Jackson …the legend continues and the first official documentary on Jackson produced after the worldwide successes of his solo albums Off the Wall (1979), Thriller (1982) and Bad (1987). It contained, in addition to many previously unpublished images, for the first time exclusive clips and footage from his first solo tour, the Bad World Tour, which started in Japan in 1987.

== Synopsis ==
The documentary focuses on Jackson's life and career from childhood, chronicling his early years in the music business with his family group of him and his brothers, the Jackson 5, through to his successful career as a solo singer, which by then it already included three very successful albums for Epic Records.

To reconstruct the artist's story, some family members are interviewed, such as his brother Marlon, who for the first time tells the background of how the Jackson 5 were actually discovered by an artist called Bobby Taylor (and not the legend who believed it had been Diana Ross to discover them), the record producer Quincy Jones who talks about his first meeting with Jackson on the set of the musical film The Wiz in 1978 and the collaborations on his first solo albums.

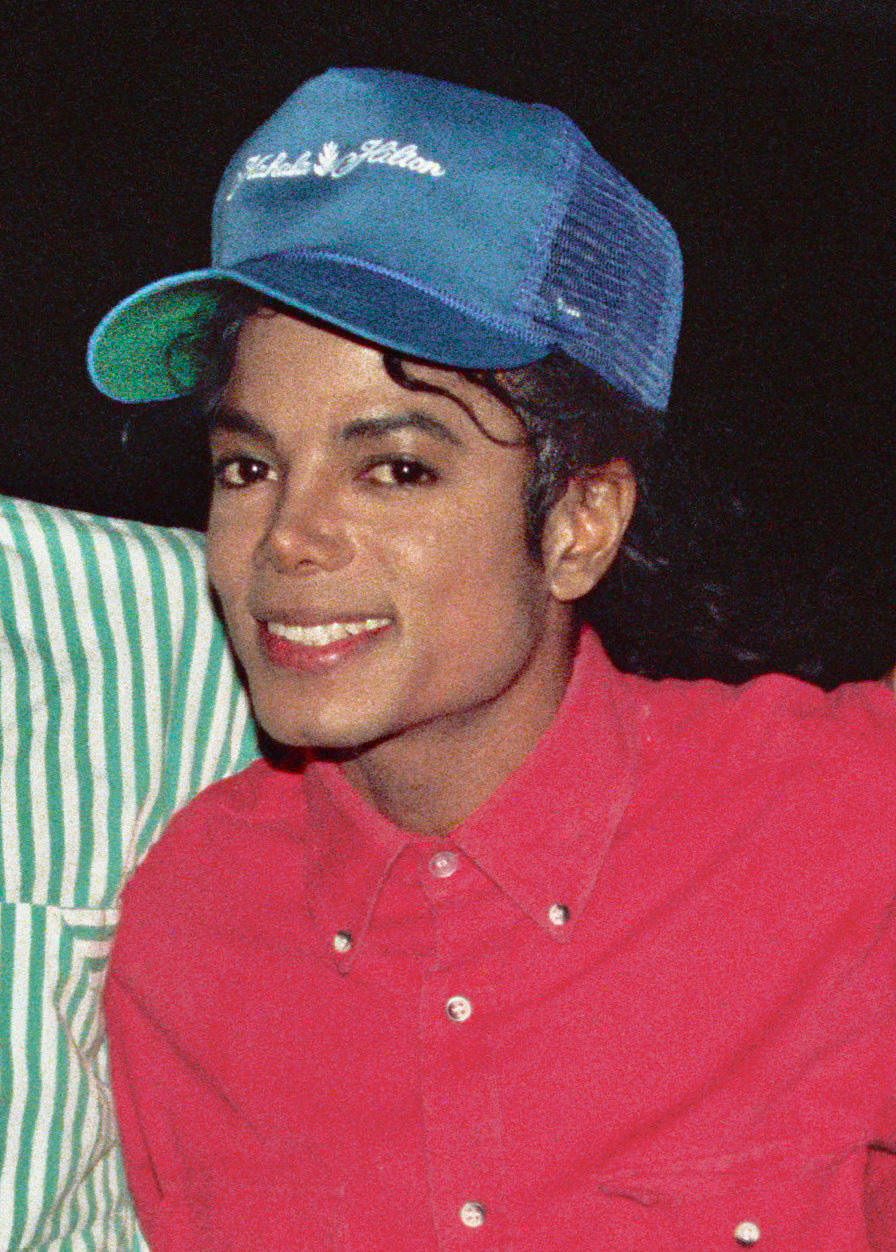
Michael Jackson in 1988.

Many other artists then simply bear witness to their friendship or tell background stories about Jackson's life and career, among these appear the historic actresses Elizabeth Taylor, Katharine Hepburn, Yoko Ono, Dick Clark, Smokey Robinson and Sophia Loren, the actor and historic dancer Gene Kelly who praises Jackson for his dance skills, the singer Sammy Davis Jr. instead in one passage utters a phrase that has become historic among Jackson fans:

If you want to see the boy next door, go out and look at the boy next door, but don't look at Michael Jackson because he's not the boy next door.

Many artists then recount the emotions they felt when they saw Jackson perform the moonwalk for the first time in the television special Motown 25: Yesterday, Today, Forever.

In a reconstruction it is then told of three fans who won a competition for MTV and who were able to meet Jackson on his return from a concert in Australia and visit the Jackson family ranch Hayvenhurst in Encino.

The documentary also contains archive footage, many unpublished at the time, and clips of videos and performances of Jackson alone and with his brothers and sisters.

== Music ==
The soundtrack used in the film was taken from the Jackson 5 to the Bad era. The documentary features some concert footage, clips and studio cut excerpts of the 22 tracks:

1. "I Want You Back"
2. "It's Your Thing"
3. "Feelin' Alright"
4. "Who's Loving You"
5. "The Love You Save"
6. "I'll Be There"
7. "Never Can Say Goodbye"
8. "Stand!"
9. "Goin' Back to Indiana"
10. "Ben"
11. "Dancing Machine"
12. "Blame It On The Boogie"
13. "Shake Your Body"
14. "Can You Feel It"
15. "Rock With You"
16. "Don't Stop Til You Get Enough"
17. "With a Child's Heart"
18. "Billie Jean"
19. "Thriller"
20. "Beat It"
21. "We Are The World"
22. "Heartbreaker Hotel" (concert footage)

== Release ==
=== Broadcast ===
The tv special was first aired in the United States on the television network Showtime series as Motown On Showtime: Michael Jackson… The Legend Continues on March 12, 1988.

=== Distribution and commercial performance ===
Michael Jackson: The Legend Continues was released worldwide on many formats including VHS and LaserDisc. It was released in the United Kingdom on 3 June 1988 by the Video Collection for £9.99. The following year it was released in the United States in May 1989 by Vestron Musicvideo.

In the UK the home release sold well and entered the music video chart at No.1 (compiled by Gallup) on June 11, 1988, staying at the top for 18 consecutive weeks until October 8, 1988. By April 1992, it had sold more than 500,000 copies in the United States, with an additional 400,000 copies sold in the United Kingdom within the first month.

== Charts ==
Chart (1988-1989)	Peak position
UK Music Video Chart (Gallup)	1
US Top Videocassettes sales (Billboard)	1
US Top Music Videocassettes (Billboard)	1

== Certifications ==
Region	Certification	Certified units/sales
United Kingdom (BPI)		400,000
United States (RIAA)		500,000
