= Why (Must We Fall in Love) =

Single by Diana Ross & the Supremes and The Temptations

from the album Together
- B-side: "Uptight (Everything's Alright)"
- Released: March 1970
- Genre: Funk, R&B, soul
- Label: Tamla Motown; TMG 730
- Songwriter(s): Deke Richards, Sherlie Matthews
- Producer(s): Frank Wilson

Diana Ross & the Supremes singles chronology
"The Rhythm of Life" (1970)	"Why (Must We Fall in Love)" (1970)	"Everybody's Got the Right to Love" (1970)

Together track listing
- 10 tracks Side one: 1. "Stubborn Kind of Fellow"; 2. "I'll Be Doggone"; 3. "The Weight"; 4. "Ain't Nothing Like the Real Thing"; 5. "Uptight (Everything's Alright)"; Side two: 6. "Sing a Simple Song"; 7. "My Guy, My Girl" (medley of both songs); 8. "For Better or Worse"; 9. "Can't Take My Eyes Off You"; 10. "Why (Must We Fall in Love)"

The Temptations singles chronology
"The Rhythm of Life" (1970)	"Why (Must We Fall in Love)" (1970)	"Ball of Confusion (That's What the World is Today)" (1970)

"Why (Must We Fall in Love)" is a Diana Ross & the Supremes and The Temptations song released in 1970 as the second single from the album Together. While the album's preceding single, "The Weight" was only released in the US and Canada, "Why (Must We Fall in Love)" was not released in North America, but was released as a single in the United Kingdom, peaking at 31 on the charts. The UK single hit the charts in March 1970, three months after Ross had left the Supremes.

== Chart history ==
Chart (1970)	Peak position
UK Singles (OCC)	31

== Personnel ==
- Lead vocals by Diana Ross and Eddie Kendricks
- Background vocals by The Supremes and The Temptations
- Instrumentation by various Los Angeles area session musicians
