= Madison Jones (producer) =

American television executive

Madison Jones is an American film and television executive and producer. He is also the Co-Chairman of the Los Angeles-based de Passe Jones Entertainment (dJE) with Suzanne de Passe.

== Career ==
Madison Jones entered the entertainment industry at an early age working for HBO in the areas of programming; Family, Sports, Variety, Comedy, Specials, Film Acquisition, and Business Affairs. Madison went on become Founder and CEO of IPM (Intellectual Properties Management) an entertainment, media and IP licensing firm. He negotiated licensing deals with such companies as Apple Computer, Microsoft, Harpo (Oprah Winfrey), Scholastic, The United Negro College Fund, NBC, Fox, ABC, HBO, ESPN, MTV, BET, and other major TV networks and film studios.

Madison built the successful global licensing business for the Estate of Martin Luther King Jr. His publishing output deal with Warner Books re-released Dr. King’s words through books and audio discs, including the posthumous, Autobiography of Martin Luther King, Jr., which won the Grammy for Best Spoken Word by actor LaVar Burton. Madison was also the architect of the $32 million deal to sell the King Papers Collection to Morehouse College.

Madison served as executive producer of the Emmy award nominated, animated production, “Our Friend Martin” (DIC/Disney) which included the voices of Oprah Winfrey and John Travolta.

Along with Suzanne de Passe, Madison executive produced President Barack Obama’s 2009 Commander-in-Chief’s Inaugural Ball honoring the nation’s military.

== Current Projects ==
Madison is currently producing a film on Martin Luther King’s life with Suzanne de Passe and Steven Spielberg for DreamWorks.

dJE has created a new comic book and graphic novel imprint in order to pre-brand some of its original content. dJE’s first project, Humpty Dumpty, the graphic novel of the upcoming horror film, will be distributed by IDW Publishing, the publishers of the Star Trek, Transformers, and GI Joe comics. Madison is producing the film Humpty Dumpty with Suzanne de Passe and two time Oscar winner Harvey Lowry.

Most recently Madison and Suzanne de Passe have closed a deal with Fox to executive produce a half-hour family comedy series called “Becoming K.K. Jones”.
