= G.I.T. on Broadway =

On Broadway (Original TV Sound Track)

Soundtrack album by Diana Ross & The Supremes and the Temptations
- Released: November 7, 1969
- Recorded: September 1969
- Genres: Soul, pop, broadway
- Length: 38:24
- Labels: Motown; MS 699
- Producers: Motown Productions, Inc./George Schlatter-Ed Friendly Productions

Diana Ross & the Supremes chronology
Cream of the Crop (1969)	On Broadway (Original TV Sound Track) (1969)	Greatest Hits Vol. 3 (1969)

The Temptations chronology
Together (1969)	On Broadway (1969)	Psychedelic Shack (1970)

Professional ratings
Review scores
Source	Rating
Allmusic	3/5 stars

G.I.T. on Broadway, also known as Diana Ross and The Supremes and The Temptations on Broadway, (Note: Official ATAS records list the title of the special as Diana Ross and The Supremes and The Temptations on Broadway.) is a 1969 television special produced by Motown Productions and George Schlatter-Ed Friendly Productions. The special, a follow-up to 1968's successful TCB program, is a musical revue starring Motown's two most popular groups at the time, Diana Ross and the Supremes with the Temptations. Containing primarily Broadway showtunes, the special was taped in September 1969 and originally broadcast November 12, 1969 on NBC. Like TCB, the title of the program was derived from an acronym, this one standing for "Gettin' It Together".

A soundtrack album for the special, titled Diana Ross and The Supremes and The Temptations on Broadway, was issued five days before the program aired. Though there were no singles released from this album in the US, "The Rhythm of Life" did become a Top 10 hit for the ensemble in Australia.

Two months after its release, Diana Ross left The Supremes to embark upon a solo career.

== Cast ==
- Diana Ross & The Supremes:
  - Diana Ross
  - Mary Wilson
  - Cindy Birdsong
- The Temptations:
  - Dennis Edwards
  - Eddie Kendricks
  - Paul Williams
  - Melvin Franklin
  - Otis Williams

== Song list of TV special ==
1. "G.I.T On Broadway"
2. Broadway Medley
3. "The Rhythm of Life"
4. "Malteds over Manhattan"
5. Medley:
  1. "It Ain't Necessarily So"
  2. "Summertime"
6. "Fiddler on the Roof Medley"
7. "The Student Mountie"
8. "Leading Lady Medley"
9. "Let the Sunshine In"
10. "Funky Broadway"
11. "G.I.T. On Broadway Reprise"

== Song list for Soundtrack Album ==
1. "G.I.T On Broadway"
2. Broadway Medley
3. "Malteds over Manhattan"
4. "Leading Lady Medley"
5. Fiddler on the Roof Medley
6. "The Student Mountie"
7. "The Rhythm of Life"
8. Finale: "Let the Sunshine In"
9. "Funky Broadway"
10. "G.I.T. On Broadway" (Reprise)

== Awards for TV special ==
The show won the Primetime Emmy Award for Outstanding Achievement in Costume Design - Bob Mackie; National Broadcasting Company (NBC)

== Availability on home media ==
As of October 2025, the show has not been officially released on home video. Various clips are available for viewing online by streaming media sites, including YouTube.

In 2017, the vinyl LP soundtrack album has been illegally remastered and reissued on CD in the U.S. (Motown, MS699).

== Charts ==
Chart (1969)	Peak position
US Billboard 200	38
US Top R&B/Hip-Hop Albums (Billboard)	4
