= Baby, Baby Don't Cry =

Single by Smokey Robinson & the Miracles

from the album Time Out for Smokey Robinson & the Miracles
- B-side: "Your Mother's Only Daughter"
- Released: December 12, 1968
- Recorded: Hitsville USA, Detroit
- Genre: Soul; pop
- Length: 3:55 (7")
- Label: Tamla
- Songwriters: Smokey Robinson; Al Cleveland; Terry Johnson
- Producers: Smokey Robinson; Warren Moore; Terry Johnson

Smokey Robinson & the Miracles singles chronology
"Special Occasion" (1968)	"Baby, Baby Don't Cry" (1968)	"Here I Go Again" / "Doggone Right" (1969)

"Baby, Baby Don't Cry", released in December 1968, is a single recorded by The Miracles for Motown Records' Tamla label. The composition was written by Miracles lead singer Smokey Robinson, Motown staff writers Al Cleveland and Terry Johnson, a former member of The Flamingos. Robinson, Johnson, and Miracles member Warren "Pete" Moore were the song's producers.

== Background ==
The song is noted for Smokey's spoken recitation at the beginning as well as before the second verse. The spoken lines are: "Nothing so blue as a heart in pain/Nothing so sad as a tear in vain", and "You trusted him and gave him your love/A love he proved unworthy of". The song uses an extended bridge that repeats the minor and diminished chords before going up half a step for the final repeated choruses.

Although not given writing credit on this particular tune, Miracle Marv Tarplin's outstanding guitar work plays an important role in this song, his gentle but effective riffs being evident from the song's beginning, giving a "raindrop" effect reminiscent of someone crying (the song's main theme).

The Miracles performed this song on a 1969 telecast of The Mike Douglas Show, a performance that was re-broadcast many years later on VH-1. The success of this song ended a period of relatively mediocre chart action for The Miracles during 1968, and set the stage for their biggest hit ever with Robinson as lead singer, 1970's multi-million selling number one hit "The Tears of a Clown".

== Personnel: The Miracles ==
- Smokey Robinson - lead vocals
- Claudette Rogers Robinson - background vocals
- Pete Moore - background vocals/vocal arrangements
- Ronnie White - background vocals
- Bobby Rogers - background vocals
- Marv Tarplin - guitar

== Other credits ==
- The Funk Brothers - instrumentation

== Chart performance ==
"Baby Baby Don't Cry" was a top 10 pop hit for The Miracles, peaking at number eight on the Billboard Hot 100 in the United States, and, was a Top 10 R&B hit as well, peaking at number three on Billboard's R&B singles chart. It sold over one million copies.

== Cover versions ==
- Gerald Wilson and His Orchestra
- Projekt
