= Abraham, Martin and John =

1968 song, a memorial for assassinated Americans

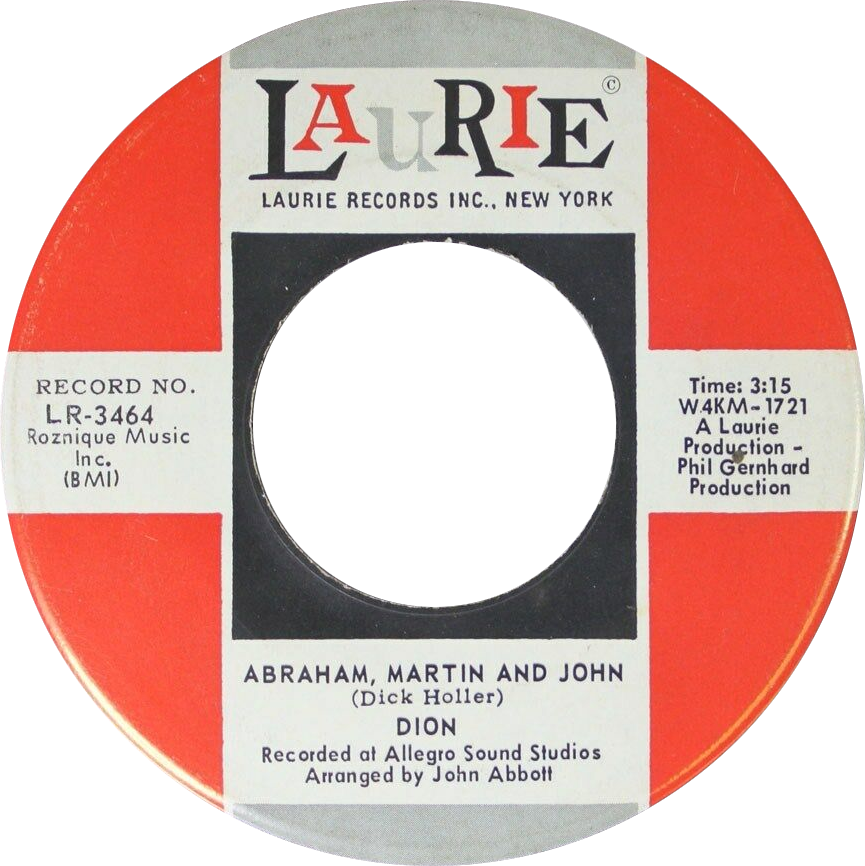
- Side A of US single

Single by Dion

from the album Dion
- B-side: "Daddy Rollin' (In Your Arms)"
- Released: August 1968
- Recorded: Allegro Sound Studios; Engineer Bruce Staple
- Genre: Folk rock
- Length: 3:15
- Label: Laurie
- Songwriter: Dick Holler
- Producer: Phil Gernhard

Dion singles chronology
"Two Ton Feather" (1966)	"Abraham, Martin and John" (1968)	"Purple Haze" (1968)

"Abraham, Martin and John"

Single by Smokey Robinson & the Miracles

from the album Time Out for Smokey Robinson & the Miracles
- B-side: "Much Better Off"
- Released: May 9, 1969
- Recorded: 1969
- Studio: Motown
- Genre: R&B
- Length: 2:51
- Label: Tamla
- Songwriter: Dick Holler
- Producer: Smokey Robinson

Smokey Robinson & the Miracles singles chronology
"Doggone Right" (1969)	"Abraham, Martin and John" (1969)	"Point It Out" (1969)

"Abraham, Martin and John"

Single by Moms Mabley

from the album Abraham, Martin & John
- B-side: "Sunny"
- Released: June 1969
- Recorded: 1969
- Genre: Easy listening
- Length: 3:48
- Label: Mercury
- Songwriter: Dick Holler
- Producer: Barry Oslander

"Abraham, Martin and John" is a 1968 song written by Dick Holler. It was first recorded by Dion, in a version that was a substantial North American chart hit in 1968–1969. Near-simultaneous cover versions by Smokey Robinson and the Miracles and Moms Mabley also charted in the U.S. in 1969, and a version that same year by Marvin Gaye became the hit version in the UK. It was also a hit as part of a medley (with "What the World Needs Now Is Love") for Tom Clay in 1971, and has subsequently been recorded by many other artists. Holler was particularly impressed that Bob Dylan covered the song.

The song itself is a tribute to the memory of four assassinated Americans, all icons of social change: Abraham Lincoln, John F. Kennedy, Martin Luther King Jr., and Robert F. Kennedy. It was written in response to the assassination of King and that of Robert Kennedy in April and June 1968, respectively.

In June 2026, CBS News included the song in its list of the 250 essential American songs of the past 250 years.

== Lyrics ==
Each of the first three verses features one of the men named in the song's title, for example:

Anybody here seen my old friend Abraham?
Can you tell me where he's gone?
He freed a lot of people, but it seems the good, they die young;
I just looked around and he was gone.

After a bridge, the fourth and final verse mentions "Bobby" (referencing Robert F. Kennedy), and ends with a description of him "walking over the hill" with the other three men.

== Dion recording ==
The original version, recorded by Dion, featured a gentle folk rock production from Phil Gernhard and arrangement from John Abbott. The song features a flugelhorn, an electric organ, bass, drums and harp.

Dion was a recovering heroin addict living in South Florida when Holler and Gernhard brought him the song, and had turned his career toward acoustic folk singing. Holler had written the song in St. Petersburg, Florida, shortly after hearing about Robert Kennedy's death. Dion performed the song on The Smothers Brothers Comedy Hour in October 1968. Although it was quite unlike the rock sound that Dion had become famous for in the early 1960s, and even more unlike Holler and Gernhard's previous collaboration in the 1966 novelty song "Snoopy vs. the Red Baron", "Abraham, Martin and John" nonetheless was a major American hit single in late 1968. It reached number 2 on the Cash Box Top 100 Pop Singles chart, number 4 on the Billboard Hot 100, and number 1 on Chicago station WLS. It was also awarded a RIAA gold record for selling a million copies. In Canada, it topped the charts, reaching number 1 in the RPM 100 on November 25, 1968. In 2001, this recording would be ranked number 248 on the RIAA's "Songs of the Century" list. The record was also popular with adult listeners, reaching number 8 on the Billboard Easy Listening survey. The personnel on the original recording included Vinnie Bell and Ralph Casale on guitar, Nick DeCaro on organ, David Robinson on drums, Gloria Agostini on harp, and George Marge on oboe and English horn.

Dion would re-record the song a few times throughout his career, with the latest recording being released on his 2025 album The Rock 'N' Roll Philosopher.

== Chart performance ==
=== Weekly charts ===
Chart (1968–69)	Peak position
Canada RPM 100	1
New Zealand (Listener)	12
US Billboard Hot 100	4
US Billboard Adult Contemporary	8
US Billboard R&B	32
US Cash Box Top 100	2

=== Year-end charts ===
Chart (1968)	Rank
Canada	91
US (Joel Whitburn's Pop Annual)	43

== Certifications ==
Certifications for "Abraham, Martin and John"
Region	Certification	Certified units/sales
United States (RIAA)	Gold	1,000,000^{^}
^{^} Shipments figures based on certification alone.

== Later recordings and performances ==
- Smokey Robinson & the Miracles recorded a version that became an American Top 40 single in 1969, reaching number 33 while reaching number 16 on the US R&B charts.
- Marvin Gaye, with an orchestral arrangement by Norman Whitfield, also recorded a version in 1969 that became a top-10 hit (reaching number 9) in the United Kingdom in 1970 (Gaye's version was never released in the U.S. as a single but was featured on his 1970 album, That's the Way Love Is, and was one of his first experiments with social messages in his music which would culminate in his 1971 album, What's Going On.)
- Comedian Moms Mabley performed a completely serious version that hit the U.S. Top 40. It reached number 35 in July 1969 and number 18 on the R&B charts, making Mabley (at 75) the oldest living person to have a U.S. Top 40 hit.
- Ray Charles recorded his version of the song on his 1972 album A Message from the People.
- Wilson Pickett recorded a variation of the song, "Cole, Cooke & Redding" (US number 91 / Canada number 58), as the B-side of his 1970 version of The Archies' hit "Sugar, Sugar". His version altered the lyrics to eulogize the titular three deceased icons of black music.
- Whitney Houston performed the song in 1997 in her concert series Classic Whitney: Live from Washington, D.C..

== As part of medleys ==
The song is also featured on Tom Clay's 1971 "What the World Needs Now Is Love/Abraham, Martin, and John", a medley combining Dion's recording with Jackie DeShannon's recording of Burt Bacharach's "What the World Needs Now Is Love", along with vocals by The Blackberries. Clay's recording features narration (an adult asking a child to define several words associated with social unrest), sound bites from speeches given by President John F. Kennedy, Robert F. Kennedy, and Martin Luther King Jr., along with sound bites from the live press coverage of Robert Kennedy's assassination, and his eulogy by his brother Edward M. Kennedy. It reached number 8 on the Billboard Hot 100 chart on August 14, 1971, and number 32 on the R&B charts. It reached number 3 in Australia.

== See also ==
- Civil rights movement in popular culture
- Cultural depictions of Abraham Lincoln
- Cultural depictions of John F. Kennedy
- Robert F. Kennedy in media
