= Sweet Charity (original Broadway cast recording) =

- CD reissue cover

Cast recording by the original Broadway cast
- Released: February 7, 1966
- Label: Columbia Masterworks
- Producer: Goddard Lieberson

Sweet Charity, subtitled A New Musical Comedy, is an album containing a recording of the 1966 Broadway musical Sweet Charity made by its original cast, with Gwen Verdon in the title role. The album was released on Columbia Masterworks on February 7, 1966.

== Background ==
Columbia having obtained "the original cast album rights to the upcoming Broadway musical Sweet Charity" was reported by Billboard on September 25, 1965. Originally, the album was planned to be released by Capitol Records, but they reportedly "bowed out" when the musical's producers asked for more money than Capitol intended to pay.

== Critical reception ==
Professional ratings
Review scores
Source	Rating
AllMusic	(1999 CD with bonus tracks)

In a retrospective review on AllMusic, Sony's 1999 CD reissue of this album was rated 5 out of five stars.

== Chart performance ==
The album reached number 92 on the Billboard's Top LPs chart.

== Track listing ==
LP – Columbia Masterworks – KOL 6500 (mono), KOS 2900 (stereo)

All lyrics are written by Dorothy Fields; all music is composed by Cy Coleman.

Side 1
No.	Title	Artist(s)	Length
1.	"Overture"	Orchestra	3:32
2.	"You Should See Yourself"	Gwen Verdon	2:28
3.	"Big Spender"	Helen Gallagher, Thelma Oliver and girls	3:39
4.	"Charity's Soliloquy"	Gwen Verdon	4:21
5.	"Rich Man's Frug"	Orchestra	1:44
6.	"If My Friends Could See Me Now"	Gwen Verdon	3:33
7.	"Too Many Tomorrows"	James Luisi	3:09
8.	"There's Gotta Be Something Better than This"	Gwen Verdon, Helen Gallagher, Thelma Oliver	4:53

Side 2
No.	Title	Artist(s)	Length
1.	"Charity's Theme"	Orch.	1:26
2.	"I'm the Bravest Individual"	Gwen Verdon, John McMartin	2:22
3.	"The Rhythm of Life"	Arnold Soboloff, Harold Pierson, Eddie Gasper and worshippers	4:01
4.	"Baby Dream Your Dream"	Helen Gallagher, Thelma Oliver	3:48
5.	"Sweet Charity (You Wanna Bet)"	John McMartin, chorus	2:47
6.	"Where Am I Going?"	Gwen Verdon	3:23
7.	"I Love to Cry at Weddings"	John Wheeler, Michael Davis, Helen Gallagher, Thelma Oliver, girls and patrons	3:13
8.	"I'm a Brass Band"	Gwen Verdon and The Brass Band	2:46
9.	"Finale – Charity's Theme"	Orchestra	1:24

== Charts ==
Chart (1966)	Peak position
US Billboard Top LPs	92

== Awards ==
Year	Award type	Categories	Results	Ref.
1967	Grammy Awards	Best Score from an Original Cast Show Album	Nominated	
