= Special Occasion (The Miracles song) =

Single by Smokey Robinson & the Miracles

from the album Special Occasion
- B-side: "Give Her Up"
- Released: August 1968
- Genre: Soul; pop
- Length: 2:17
- Label: Tamla; T 54172
- Songwriters: Smokey Robinson; Al Cleveland
- Producers: Smokey Robinson; Al Cleveland

Smokey Robinson & the Miracles singles chronology
"Yester Love" (1968)	"Special Occasion" (1968)	"Baby, Baby Don't Cry" (1969)

"Special Occasion" is a 1968 hit single recorded by Motown Records R&B group Smokey Robinson and The Miracles, issued by its Tamla Records subsidiary and taken from the album of the same name. It was written and composed by Miracles lead singer Smokey Robinson and Motown staff songwriter Al Cleveland, the authors of the group's Top 10 million-selling smash, "I Second That Emotion", the previous year.

== Reception ==
Cash Box called it a "mid-speed song" with "extremely effective orchestration."

== Chart performance ==
"Special Occasion" was a Billboard Top 30 Pop hit, peaking at #26, and was a Top 10 R&B hit as well, peaking at #4.

== Credits: The Miracles ==
=== Personnel ===
- Smokey Robinson lead vocals
- Claudette Robinson soprano
- Pete Moore bass vocals
- Marv Tarplin guitar
- Ronnie White baritone
- Bobby Rogers tenor

=== Other credits ===
- The Funk Brothers instruments

== Cover versions ==
- "Special Occasion" has inspired a cover version by Jazz/R&B singer Jim Gilstrap. Its flip side, "Give Her Up", was a cover of a song Smokey had written for Martha & the Vandellas in 1963. "Give Her Up", like many Miracles' "B" sides, was also a popular regional hit. Video on YouTube
