= The Rhythm of Life =

Single by Diana Ross & the Supremes and The Temptations

from the album G.I.T. on Broadway
- B-side: "Ain't No Mountain High Enough"
- Released: 1970
- Genre: Funk, R&B, Soul
- Label: Tamla Motown; TMO 9149
- Songwriter(s): Cy Coleman, Dorothy Fields
- Producer(s): George Schlatter

Diana Ross & the Supremes singles chronology
"Up the Ladder to the Roof" (1970)	"The Rhythm of Life" (1970)	"Why (Must We Fall in Love)" (1970)

The Temptations singles chronology
"Psychedelic Shack" (1970)	"The Rhythm of Life" (1970)	"Why (Must We Fall in Love)" (1970)

"The Rhythm of Life" is a song from the 1966 Broadway musical Sweet Charity, written by composer Cy Coleman and lyricist Dorothy Fields.

In the musical, the song is performed by the character Big Daddy, the leader of an alternative "hippie" religious group/cult called the "Rhythm of Life Church." In the 1969 movie musical adaptation of Sweet Charity, directed by Bob Fosse (who also directed the original Broadway production), the song is performed by Sammy Davis Jr., who co-stars as Big Daddy in the film.

The same year as the release of the Sweet Charity film, Diana Ross & the Supremes and The Temptations covered the song for their G.I.T. on Broadway television special, originally broadcast November 12, 1969 on NBC with a soundtrack album released a few days earlier on November 7. Their version was released as a single in 1970 in Australia and New Zealand, where it was a top 5 and top 20 hit, respectively.

== Track listing ==
=== Australia ===
Side one
No.	Title	Lyrics	Music	Producer(s)	Length
1.	"The Rhythm of Life"	Dorothy Fields	Cy Coleman	George Schlatter	4:06

Side two
No.	Title	Writer(s)	Length
1.	"Ain't No Mountain High Enough"	Nickolas Ashford, Valerie Simpson	2:15

=== New Zealand ===
Side one
No.	Title	Lyrics	Music	Producer(s)	Length
1.	"The Rhythm of Life"	Dorothy Fields	Cy Coleman	George Schlatter	4:06

Side two
No.	Title	Writer(s)	Arranger(s)	Length
1.	"Sweet Inspiration"	Spooner Oldham, Dan Penn	Frank Wilson	2:55

== Charts ==
=== Weekly charts ===
Chart (1970)	Peak position
Australia (Cashbox)	3
Australia (Go-Set)	7
Australia (Kent Music Report)	5
New Zealand (Listener)	16

=== Year-end charts ===
Chart (1969)	Rank
Australia (Kent Music Report)	33
