= Terry "Buzzy" Johnson =

American singer, songwriter and producer (1938–2025)

- Born: Isaiah Samuel Johnson; November 12, 1938; Baltimore, Maryland, U.S.
- Died: October 8, 2025 (aged 86) Las Vegas, Nevada, U.S.
- Occupations: Singer; songwriter; music producer
- Formerly of: The Flamingos

Isaiah Samuel Johnson (November 12, 1938 – October 8, 2025), known professionally as Terry "Buzzy" Johnson, was an American popular music singer, songwriter, and music producer.

== Early career ==
Johnson was born on November 12, 1938, in Baltimore, Maryland, and grew up as a neighbor of The Orioles' Sonny Til and The Swallows' Earl Hurley. In 1954, Johnson formed The Whispers (no relation to the more famous Los Angeles-based group) with four high school friends, and recorded for Gotham Records (based in Philadelphia, Pennsylvania). He wrote, arranged and sang lead on "Fool Heart" and "Are You Sorry?", both released in 1955.

Johnson is the duet lead heard, along with Paul Wilson, on "Lovers Never Say Goodbye", "Love Walked In", "Time Was" and "But Not For Me", all Billboard chart hits (except the latter). He recorded three albums with The Flamingos, Flamingo Serenade, Requestfully Yours and Flamingo Favorites. They toured extensively and appeared five times on the TV show American Bandstand.

== Touring as The Flamingos featuring Terry Johnson ==
Shortly after Tommy Hunt left the group in 1961, the Flamingos split into two groups, one with the Careys and Paul Wilson and one with Terry Johnson and Nate Nelson calling themselves at varying times, the Modern Flamingos, the Fabulous Flamingos and later simply, Terry Johnson's Flamingos. The two recorded on Atco together in 1963 as the Starglows. The result was the Johnson-penned ballad "Let's Be Lovers" (b/w "Walk Away Softly", written by Skyliners' manager and "Since I Don't Have You" co-author Joe Rock). Johnson wanted to record more than tour while Nelson, having a family to support by this time, wanted to perform. Nelson joined The Platters shortly after. Johnson re-recorded "Let's Be Lovers" in 2005, with artists Jeff Calloway and TeeTee for his own Hot Fun Record label. Johnson was the owner of "The Flamingos" federal trademark and led the most recent incarnation of the group. The lineup was Johnson, Starling Newsome, Stan Prinston and musical director Theresa Trigg. The Flamingos featuring Terry Johnson appeared on two PBS specials: Rock and Roll at Fifty (in which they were the only group to have more than two songs featured) and Doo Wop Cavalcade: The Definitive Anthology. In 2013, The Flamingos released the Diamond Anniversary Tour CD. They continued to perform in concerts across the country.

== At Motown ==
In 1964, Smokey Robinson recruited Johnson onto the staff of Motown Records where he and Robinson became regular collaborators. Their most notable credited work was the 1969 Billboard Top 10 hit for The Miracles, "Baby, Baby Don't Cry". Other charted hits include "Malinda" for Bobby Taylor & the Vancouvers and "Here I Go Again" for Smokey Robinson & the Miracles. Johnson also wrote and produced for the Four Tops, the Temptations, Martha and the Vandellas and the Supremes. In 1969, Johnson released the solo 45's "My Springtime" and "Whatcha Gonna Do", both b/w "Suzie" on Gordy Records (a Motown subsidiary.) He then released the follow-up "Stone Soul Booster" b/w "Sandy" under the name "Buzzie". When Smokey moved to California in 1974, Johnson remained in Detroit and later had a short-lived stint as Harold Melvin & the Blue Notes’ musical conductor.

== Death ==
Johnson died in Las Vegas on October 8, 2025, at the age of 86.

== Awards, accolades and latter-day ventures ==
Shortly after the Flamingos were inducted into the Rock and Roll Hall of Fame in 2001, Johnson refocused his energy on touring as Terry Johnson's Flamingos, establishing the group as a mainstay of casinos and major concert package tours. In 2013 Terry Johnson & The Flamingos received the Heroes and Legends Award (HAL) in the Pioneer category.

In 2017, Johnson released two No. 1 singles on the European Indie Music Chart breaking records for being No. 1 for four weeks and is featured on multiple playlists on Spotify. Pollstar Magazine calls him the "Musical Chameleon". Boyz II Men recruited Johnson and his producing partner Theresa Trigg for their 2017 CD release Under The Streetlight, where they re-produced his famous arrangement of "I Only Have Eyes For You", which Johnson had arranged, sung and played guitar on for The Flamingos.

In 2013, Johnson released the Diamond Anniversary Tour 2013 CD to commemorate the 60th anniversary of The Flamingos. In 2015, The Flamingos, appeared on The View with Whoopi Goldberg.
