= Al Cleveland =

- Born: Alfred W. Cleveland; March 11, 1930
- Died: August 14, 1996
- Genres: Motown; soul; dancehall

Al Cleveland (born Alfred W. Cleveland; March 11, 1930 – August 14, 1996) was an American songwriter for the Motown label. Among his most popular co-compositions are 1967's "I Second That Emotion" and 1969's "Baby, Baby Don't Cry" performed by Smokey Robinson & the Miracles and 1971's "What's Going On" performed by Marvin Gaye.

Cleveland was born in Pittsburgh, Pennsylvania, United States, to Alfred W. and Dorothy Cleveland. Al was one of four children; two sisters, Edna Grate and Mamie Jett, as well as one brother, Robert Cleveland.

He had a long and distinguished writing career, initially for New York artists on the Scepter/Wand labels such as Dionne Warwick and Tommy Hunt, as well as Gene Pitney before moving to Motown, where he provided songs for Smokey & The Miracles, The Marvelettes, David Ruffin, the Four Tops and Chuck Jackson before hitting the big time with a co-authorship of Marvin Gaye's "What's Goin' On?" and "Save the Children."

In later years, he produced Native American music. He died of heart disease in Las Vegas at the age of 66. Cleveland was survived by two sons, Alfred and Theodore.
