= Where Go the Boats =

Studio album by John Handy
- Released: 1978
- Genre: Jazz
- Label: Warner Bros.
- Producer: Esmond Edwards

John Handy chronology
Carnival (1977)	Where Go the Boats (1978)	Handy Dandy Man (1978)

Professional ratings
Review scores
Source	Rating
AllMusic	1/5 stars
Omaha World-Herald	3/5 stars

Where Go the Boats is a 1978 album by jazz saxophonist John Handy.

== Track listing ==
All tracks composed by John Handy; except where indicated

Side one

1. "Right There, Right There" (John Handy, James Leary)
2. "Moogie Woogie"
3. "Where Go the Boats" (Beatrice Scott, Robert Louis Stevenson, Peter W. Dykema)
4. "Go for Yourself"

Side two

1. "The Hissing of Summer Lawns" (Joni Mitchell, John Guerin)
2. "She Just Won't Boogie with Me" (Eddie "Bongo" Brown, John Handy, Abraham Laboriel, Bill King, James Gadson, Lee Ritenour)
3. "Erica"
4. "Salud to Sonny"

== Personnel ==
- John Handy – alto saxophone
- Bill King – piano
- Steve Erquiaga – guitar
- Lee Ritenour – guitar
- Abraham Laboriel – electric bass
- James Leary – bass
- James Gadson – drums
- Eddie Marshall – drums
- Eddie "Bongo" Brown – conga drums
- Aashish Khan – sarod
- Ian Underwood – synthesizers
- Herman Riley – tenor saxophone
- Nolan Smith – trumpet
- Donald W. Cooke – trombone
