= Narayana Subramaniam =

Indian oncologist

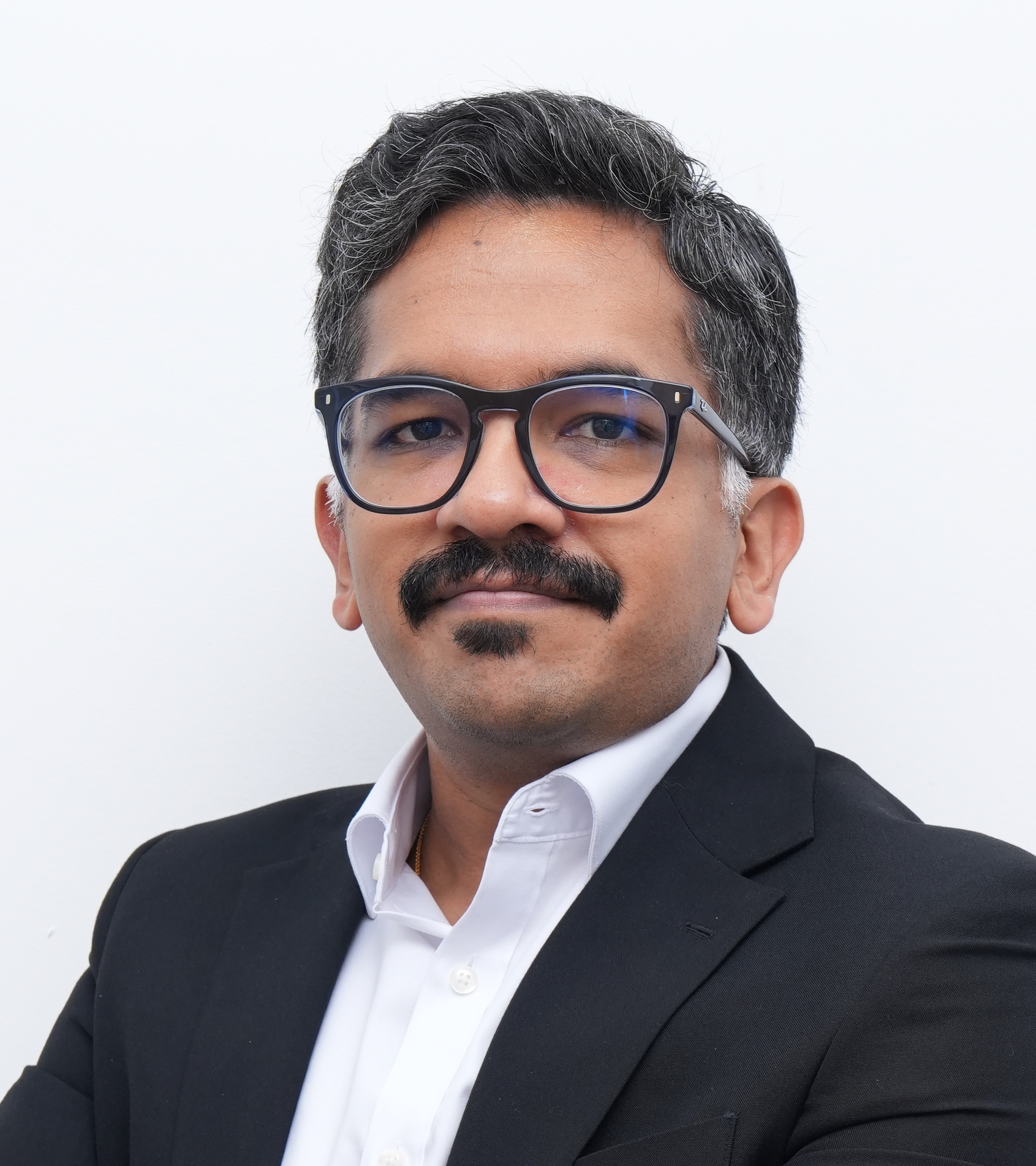
- Born: Bangalore, Karnataka, India
- Citizenship: Indian
- Education: MBBS, MS — M. S. Ramaiah Medical College; MCh — Amrita Institute of Medical Sciences; MRCSEd — Royal College of Surgeons of Edinburgh; FICRS
- Occupations: Surgical oncologist, author, singer
- Parent(s): L. Subramaniam (father); Viji Subramaniam (mother)
- Relatives: Ambi Subramaniam (brother); Bindu Subramaniam (sister)
- Website: drnarayana.in

Narayana Subramaniam is an Indian head and neck surgical oncologist based in Bengaluru, where he is Lead Consultant at the Aster International Institute of Oncology. He is also a singer and author. His father is L. Subramaniam, the Carnatic violinist and composer who holds the Padma Bhushan and has recorded over 200 albums in a career spanning five decades. His siblings are Ambi Subramaniam, a violinist and Associate Dean of the Subramaniam Academy of Performing Arts, and Bindu Subramaniam, a singer and educator. He has published numerous papers in head and neck oncology and has been an Associate Editor of Frontiers in Oncology since 2021.

== Background ==
Subramaniam is the son of L. Subramaniam and his first wife, Viji Subramaniam, who died in 1996. His father subsequently married Kavita Krishnamurthy, the Bollywood playback singer, in 1999. His brother Ambi Subramaniam has performed at Carnegie Hall, the Lincoln Center, and the Philharmonie de Paris. His sister Bindu Subramaniam co-founded the SaPa in Schools programme, which works with 30,000 children across India.

He has performed as a singer alongside his father and is a featured artist on Vande Mataram and Vaishnava Janato. He co-authored Lakshminarayana Global Music Festival: Twenty Years of Global Collaborations and Festival Beyond Borders.

== Education ==
He completed his MBBS and MS in General Surgery at M. S. Ramaiah Medical College, Bengaluru, before moving to the Amrita Institute of Medical Sciences in Kochi for his MCh in Head and Neck Oncology. He was among the first surgeons in Karnataka to receive this degree, graduating in 2015 as a distinguished alumnus. He subsequently sat the examinations of the Royal College of Surgeons of Edinburgh, obtaining the MRCSEd diploma, and holds the FICRS fellowship. He also received a fellowship in robotic surgery. Further training took him to the Sydney Head and Neck Cancer Institute in Australia and to the University of Pennsylvania in the United States.

== Career ==
Subramaniam's surgical practice covers cancers of the oral cavity, oropharynx, salivary glands, thyroid, larynx, pharynx, sinonasal cavity and anterior skull base. He operates in the post-radiotherapy salvage setting and performs microvascular free-flap reconstruction. He has a clinical interest in the jaw-in-a-day technique, which involves same-session implant-based dental rehabilitation following jaw resection, and in facial nerve reanimation. He published one of the largest global series on single-stage jaw reconstruction in the setting of oral cancer.

He worked at Sri Shankara Cancer Hospital and Research Centre, Bengaluru, before being appointed Director of Head and Neck Surgery and Oncology, and Director of Clinical Innovation, at Sparsh Hospitals in November 2023. He joined the Aster International Institute of Oncology as Lead Consultant in May 2025. He served as chair of the Bengaluru chapter of the All India Management Association Young Leaders Council.

=== Notable cases ===
In February 2024, The Hindu reported on a skull base surgery he performed at Sparsh Hospitals. A tumour was removed from a 67-year-old patient without splitting the jaw or cutting the face, using a novel transoral transpterygoid approach. In 2022, he operated on a case of chondrosarcoma of the temporomandibular joint at Shankara Cancer Hospital. At the time, only 34 such cases had been documented in world literature. It became the 35th.

== Research ==
His research has centred on oral cancer staging and operative outcomes. A 2021 multicentre paper examined how the AJCC 8th edition staging system performed globally, finding that outcomes varied significantly by geographical location. This matters because India carries one of the highest oral cancer burdens in the world, and the staging system was built largely on Western data. Other work has examined risk stratification in oral cancer and whether lymph node count, rather than node size, better predicts outcomes in oral cancer staging. As of early 2026 his work had received over 1,330 citations, with an h-index of 17.

=== Editorial roles and books ===
He has been an Associate Editor of Frontiers in Oncology since October 2021 and co-edited a 2022 special issue on staging in head and neck cancers for the same journal. He is the editor of Comprehensive Management of Head and Neck Cancer published by Jaypee Brothers Medical Publishers.

== In the press ==
He contributed to a The Hindu article in 2024 on the use of arc therapy in head and neck cancer, noting that limiting radiation dose to surrounding structures is the central challenge in treatment planning. GE Healthcare profiled him the same year on the adoption of new technologies in cancer surgery, where he stated that cost barriers to medical innovation had fallen significantly. The New Indian Express has cited him on advances in oral cancer treatment and on immunotherapy trial results.

== Awards ==
Year	Award	Awarding body
2024	3D Technology-Assisted Oncologist of the Year	3D GEM Awards, Indian Institute of Technology Delhi
2024	Top 10 Indian Pioneers Setting New Standards in Excellence	DNA India
2024	Leading Surgical Oncologist Award	Elets 12th Healthcare Innovation Summit
2024	Indian representative	12th Annual Australia India Youth Dialogue
2023	Young National Academic Excellence Award	Indian Medical Association
2023	Healthcare World 40 Under 40	Businessworld
2023	Most Promising Healthcare Leader of the Year	2nd Annual Pharma and Health Tech Summit
2023	Asia-GCC Award for Excellence and Leadership in Healthcare	
2022	Bharat Chikitsa Puraskar National Award	
