= Shyam Kane =

- Born: Shyam Kane; 29 June 1954 (age 71); Mumbai, Maharashtra
- Genres: Hindustani Classical Music
- Instrument: Tabla
- Years active: 1975–present

Pandit Shyam Kane (born 29 June 1954) is an Indian Tabla player of the Punjab Gharana. Pt. Kane is most recognized for being the first and foremost disciple and colleague of Utd. Zakir Hussain.

== Personal life and education ==
Pt. Kane was born into a Konkanastha Brahmin family in 1954 and attended Parle Tilak Vidyalaya. Pt. Kane was drawn to the Tabla after his brother, Mukund Kane, took to Tabla under Pt. Pandharinath Nageshkar of the Farukhabad Gharana. Influenced by his brother, Pt. Kane began his journey in Tabla. After Pt. Kane witnessed a performance with Utd. Zakir Hussain on Tabla, he wished to learn under the young master. Captivated by the balance, clarity and creativity of Utd. Zakir Hussain's style, Pt. Kane immediately asked for him for tutelage. In 1975, Pt. Kane became a Gandabandhan disciple of Utd. Alla Rakha and began learning under both father and son.

== Career ==
Pt. Kane has become a popular Tabla accompanist in India, North America, and Europe. Pt. Kane participated in the Festival of India (1985–1986) sponsored by the Government of India. Pt. Kane has taught Tabla at San Diego State University and the Ali Akbar College of Music in San Rafael, California. Pt. Kane frequently performs alongside his guru, Utd. Zakir Hussain, where recently both performed together at the 2007 Brihan Maharashtra Mandal Convention in Seattle.

Pt. Kane has performed alongside Pt. Jasraj, Pt. Hariprasad Chaurasia, Utd. Ali Akbar Khan, Smt. Ashwini Bhide-Deshpande, Smt. N. Rajam, and Smt. Kishori Amonkar, Asha Khadilkar among others.

== Awards and recognition ==
- 1987-1988 - Ohio Art Council Fellowship

== Discography ==
With John Handy, Ali Akbar Khan and Dr. L. Subramaniam

- Rainbow (MPS, 1981)
