= The London Bo Diddley Sessions =

Studio album by Bo Diddley
- Released: 1973
- Recorded: 1973
- Studio: Ter-Mar (Chicago, US); Philips (London, UK)
- Genre: Soul; funk
- Length: 35:47
- Label: Chess; CH 50029
- Producer: Esmond Edwards

Bo Diddley chronology
Where It All Began (1972)	The London Bo Diddley Sessions (1973)	Big Bad Bo (1974)

London Sessions chronology
The London Chuck Berry Sessions (1972)	The London Bo Diddley Sessions (1973)

The London Bo Diddley Sessions is the 17th studio album by musician Bo Diddley recorded in 1973 and released on the Chess label.

== Reception ==
Professional ratings
Review scores
Source	Rating
AllMusic	2.5/5 stars
Select	4/5 medals

Allmusic awarded the album 2½ stars with reviewer Bruce Eder stating "Bo's presence was somewhat overwhelmed by the massive number of session musicians involved (well-meaning though they may have been) and more so, because Bo was still looking for a new sound, ... The songs are pretty fair -- a mix of soul and funk -- with elements of his old sound, and this is probably the best compromise he achieved during this phase of his career, between the old and the new".

== Track listing ==
All tracks by Ellas McDaniel except where noted

1. "Don't Want No Lyin' Woman" – 3:58
2. "Bo Diddley" – 2:54
3. "Going Down" (Allen Toussaint) – 2:54
4. "Make a Hit Record" – 4:59
5. "Bo-Jam" – 3:31
6. "Husband-In-Law" (Sam Dees, Jimmy Lewis, Frederick Knight) – 3:32
7. "Do the Robot" – 5:40
8. "Sneakers on a Rooster" (Dees, Dee Camon) – 2:41
9. "Get Out of My Life" – 5:09
- Recorded at Ter-Mar Studio, Chicago, IL (tracks 3, 6 & 8) and London, England (tracks 1, 2, 4, 5, 7 & 9)

== Personnel ==
- Bo Diddley – vocals, guitar
- Ray Fenwick (tracks 1, 2, 4, 5, 7 & 9) – guitar
- Gerald Sims (tracks 3, 6 & 8) – guitar
- Phil Upchurch (tracks 3, 6 & 8) – guitar
- Roy Wood (tracks 1, 2, 4, 5, 7 & 9) – bass
- Richard Evans (tracks 3, 6 & 8) – bass
- Tennyson Stephens – piano (tracks 3, 6 & 8)
- Eddie Hardin – organ (tracks 1, 2, 4, 5, 7 & 9)
- Arthur Hoyle, Frank Gordon, Murray Watson – trumpet (tracks 3, 6 & 8)
- Steve Galloway – trombone (tracks 3, 6 & 8)
- Clifford Davis – tenor saxophone, baritone saxophone (tracks 3, 6 & 8)
- Gene Barge – tenor saxophone (tracks 3, 6 & 8)
- Willie Henderson – baritone saxophone (tracks 3, 6 & 8)
- Keith Smart – drums (tracks 1, 2, 4, 5, 7 & 9)
- Robert Crowder, Brian Grice – drums, percussion (tracks 3, 6 & 8)
- Nigel Grainge – percussion (tracks 1, 2, 4, 5, 7 & 9)
- Charles Grimar (tracks 1, 2, 4, 5, 7 & 9), Derf Reklan Raheem (tracks 3, 6 & 8) – congas
- Cookie Vee – tambourine, vocals
- Richard Evans – arranger
