= Brass Fever (album) =

Studio album by Brass Fever
- Released: 1975
- Recorded: 1975
- Genre: Jazz
- Length: 34:23
- Label: Impulse! ASD 9308
- Producer: Esmond Edwards

Brass Fever chronology
Brass Fever (1975)	Time Is Running Out (1976)

Professional ratings
Review scores
Source	Rating
AllMusic	3/5 stars

Brass Fever is the debut album by American jazz/R&B group Brass Fever, recorded in 1975 and released on the Impulse! label.

== Reception ==
The AllMusic review states: "Brass Fever is unapologetically funky, and this very enjoyable LP (which is the band's most essential release) is strictly for those who like their jazz laced with lots of R&B".

== Track listing ==
1. "Lady Marmalade" (Bob Crewe, Kenny Nolan) - 5:58
2. "Djingi" (B. Branynon) - 6:51
3. "Sunshine Superman" (Donovan Leitch) - 6:28
4. "Back at the Chicken Shack" (Jimmy Smith) - 7:26
5. "Bach Bone" (Johann Sebastian Bach) - 7:40

== Personnel ==
- Buddy Collette - flute
- Oscar Brashear - trumpet
- George Bohanon, Garnett Brown, Charlie Loper, Frank Rosolino - trombone
- John Handy - alto saxophone
- Lee Ritenour - electric guitar
- Sonny Burke - electric piano
- Phil Wright - piano, organ, clavinet
- Scott Edwards - electric bass
- Shelly Manne - drums
- Eddie "Bongo" Brown - percussion
- Wade Marcus - conductor, arranger
