= Subramaniam Academy of Performing Arts =

The Subramaniam Academy of Performing Arts (SaPa) was founded in 2007, by violinist Dr. L. Subramaniam and Bollywood playback singer Kavita Krishnamurti Subramaniam. It is run by singer/songwriter Bindu Subramaniam and violinist Ambi Subramaniam.

SaPa takes in musically inclined children as young as three years old and helps them build a career in music. The institute uses Baby Rooms, baby Dikshitar and Tyagaraja characters in the textbooks, and stuffed toy musical instruments to make music fun for children. The focus is Indian classical music, but students are also exposed to music from over 20 countries.

Located in Bangalore, SaPa's main centre is in Sanjaynagar with branches in Rajajinagar, Whitefield, and Basavangudi.

== Classes ==
SaPa offers ongoing classes in various subjects: vocal, violin, western piano, western theory, songwriting, drums, mridangam, konnakol, western voice, and choir. In addition, special six-week courses are available to professional International musicians looking to incorporate elements of Indian music into their work.

== Examinations ==
SaPa conducts formal examinations and certifications for its students to test their all-round music skills: technical, theory, and performance. Its exams are conducted at the end of every academic year (or musical level).

Broadly, the institute provides assessments for the SaPa Baby level, intermediate level, and advanced level.

== SaPa in Schools ==
Founded in 2014, SaPa in Schools is an initiative to integrate music into the mainstream academic curriculum. Its aim is to provide music for all children, irrespective of background or circumstance.

SaPa in Schools works with over 30,000 students in India annually (as of 2019), through partnerships with schools in five Indian states – Karnataka, Tamil Nadu, Kerala, Andhra Pradesh, and Maharashtra.

=== Teacher Training ===
In collaboration with the Norwegian Academy of Music, SaPa in Schools provides structured teacher training programs to music educators. Teachers are trained to deliver the SaPa in Schools curriculum to children of different age groups and cultural backgrounds. Full-scale training programs are conducted twice a year, and the institute conducts regular spot checks to ensure that the curriculum is implemented in schools effectively.

The teacher training process is two-fold; educators are taught both the curriculum and method. The curriculum includes the global component, which teaches children about the culture and music of at fifteen countries, and a Music and The World Around component, which draws parallels between music and subjects like mathematics and science.

=== Undergraduate course in music ===
In collaboration with Jain University, the Norwegian Academy of Music, and the Lakshminarayana Global Centre for Excellence (LGCE), SaPa offers India's first undergraduate course in music education, performance, and technology.

== The SaPa Show ==
The SaPa Show is an educational TV program for young children. It is anchored by Bindu Subramaniam, Ambi Subramaniam, Vivek Sadasivam, and Kanchana S. Shrutiranjani. It features artists including Dr. L Subramaniam as well as guest artists from around the world. The show aims to teach Indian classical music to children who may not have access to it, and is structured to introduce a new instrument or artist every week.

Started in 2016, The SaPa Show has been described as “the antithesis of the typical musical reality show.” It airs on Sri Sankara TV every Sunday at 11 am.
