= Hard Work (album) =

Album by jazz saxophonist John Handy

Studio album by John Handy
- Released: 1976
- Recorded: January 1976
- Studio: ABC (Los Angeles)
- Genre: Jazz
- Label: ABC/Impulse; ASD 9314
- Producer: Esmond Edwards

John Handy chronology
| Karuna Supreme (1975) | Hard Work (1976) | Carnival (1977) |

Hard Work is an album by American jazz saxophonist John Handy which was recorded in 1976 and originally released on the ABC/Impulse label.

== Reception ==
Professional ratings
Review scores
| Source | Rating |
|---|---|
| AllMusic | 4/5 stars |

The album reached number 4 on the Billboard jazz chart and number 43 on the Billboard 200. AllMusic awarded the album 4 stars stating "Hard Work became a surprise hit, and overall, the set is open to the influence of R&B, although there are some strong moments from Handy on both alto and tenor". A single, "Hard Work", did reach the bubbling under positions of the UK Top 50 in September 1976.

== Track listing ==
All compositions by John Handy

1. "Hard Work" – 6:56
2. "Blues for Louis Jordan" – 5:43
3. "Young Enough to Dream" – 7:10
4. "Love for Brother Jack" – 3:48
5. "Didn't I Tell You" – 4:35
6. "Afro Wiggle" – 4:44
7. "You Don't Know" – 3:18

== Personnel ==
- John Handy – alto saxophone, tenor saxophone, vocals
- Hotep Cecil Barnard – keyboards
- Mike Hoffmann – guitar
- Chuck Rainey – electric bass
- Zakir Hussain – tabla (tracks 3, 4 & 6)
- James Gadson – drums
- Eddie "Bongo" Brown – congas, percussion
