= Hotep Idris Galeta =

South African jazz pianist and educator (1941–2010)

Background information
- Born: Cecil Galeta; 7 June 1941; Crawford, Cape Town, South Africa
- Died: 3 November 2010 (aged 69) Johannesburg, South Africa
- Genres: South African jazz, bebop, post bop, folk
- Occupations: Pianist, composer, bandleader
- Instrument: Piano
- Years active: 1955–2010
- Website: music.org.za

Hotep Idris Galeta (7 June 1941 – 3 November 2010) was a South African jazz pianist and educator. His legal name at birth was Cecil Galeta, but according to local custom he was more commonly known as a child and young man as Cecil Barnard, his father's first name being used instead of a last name.

== Biography ==
=== Early years ===
In his teens he played with some of the best jazz musicians in South Africa; Abdullah Ibrahim (then known as Dollar Brand) and Lami Zokufa introduced him to bebop and hard bop. In 1961 he left South Africa clandestinely, following many other South African performers to the United Kingdom (severe restrictions on public gatherings following the Sharpeville massacre had made entertainment careers impossible for any but white artists, and the already poor quality of life for non-whites was deteriorating rapidly as apartheid became ever stricter). After a year in the United Kingdom, he moved to the United States.

=== In the US ===
In the United States, he played and recorded with Herb Alpert, John Handy, Bobby Hutcherson, Elvin Jones, Hugh Masekela, Jackie McLean, Mario Pavone, Joshua Redman, and Archie Shepp. Outside jazz he performed and recorded with David Crosby and the Byrds. In 1985, Jackie McLean invited him to teach at The Hartt School of the University of Hartford, where he taught until his return to South Africa in 1991, following the collapse of apartheid.

=== Return to South Africa ===
After his return, he recorded, performed, and taught in South Africa. His teaching engagements included four years on the faculty of the University of Fort Hare, the musical directorship of a national music education program for high schools, and co-ordination of music outreach programs in Cape Town. He was also Project Manager for the establishment of a school of jazz and a multimedia audio visual production center at the University of Fort Hare's new urban campus in the east coast South African city of East London in the Eastern Cape Province.

=== Death ===
Galeta died in Johannesburg on the 3 November 2010, following an asthma attack.

== Discography ==
=== As leader ===
- Heading Home (The Sun, 1990)
- Malay Tone Poem (Sheer Sound, 2002)

=== As sideman ===
With John Handy

- Hard Work (ABC/Impulse, 1976)

With Bobby Hutcherson

- Bobby Hutcherson Live at Montreux (Blue Note, 1974)

With Jackie McLean

- Dynasty (Triloka, 1988)
- Rites of Passage (Triloka, 1991)
- The Jackie Mac Attack Live (Birdology, 1991)
