= Rainbow (John Handy album) =

Studio album by John Handy, Ali Akbar Khan and Dr. L. Subramaniam
- Released: 1981
- Recorded: September 3 & 4, 1980; MPS Studio in Villingen, Germany
- Genre: Jazz, World music
- Length: 46:51
- Label: MPS; MPS 15576
- Producer: Joachim-Ernst Berendt

John Handy chronology
Handy Dandy Man (1978)	Rainbow (1981)	Excursion in Blue (1988)

Rainbow is an album by American jazz saxophonist John Handy with Indian musicians Ali Akbar Khan and Dr. L. Subramaniam. It was recorded in 1980 and originally released on the MPS label.

== Reception ==
Professional ratings
Review scores
Source	Rating
Allmusic	3.5/5 stars

Allmusic awarded the album 3½ stars, stating "This album isn't bad by any stretch, but it's bound to suffer when compared to Karuna Supreme".

== Track listing ==
1. "Rajashik - The Majesty of Wisdom" (Ali Akbar Khan) - 8:10
2. "Indian Boogie Shoes" (John Handy) - 8:57
3. "Rainbow Serenade" (L. Subramaniam) - 6:28
4. "Garland of Flowers - Alap and Jod in Raga Mala" (Khan, Handy, Subramaniam) - 9:50
5. "Kali Dance" (Subramaniam) - 13:04

== Personnel ==
- John Handy - alto saxophone
- Ali Akbar Khan - sarod
- Dr. L. Subramaniam - violin
- Shyam Kane - tabla
- Mary Johnson - tanpura
