= Recorded Live at the Monterey Jazz Festival =

Live album by John Handy
- Released: May 21, 1966
- Recorded: September 18, 1965
- Venue: Monterey Jazz Festival, Monterey
- Genre: Jazz
- Length: 47:00
- Label: Columbia; CS 9262
- Producer: John H. Hammond

John Handy chronology
Jazz (1962)	Recorded Live at the Monterey Jazz Festival (1966)	The 2nd John Handy Album (1966)

Recorded Live at the Monterey Jazz Festival is a live album by saxophonist John Handy, recorded in 1965 and released in 1966. It is Handy's most famous album, and his debut on Columbia. The original album only features two long instrumental pieces, notable for their "free form", a peculiar use of harmonies and unusual instruments (violin and guitar along with more "classic" jazz instruments are uncommon in jazz music). The bonus track "Tears of Ole Miss (Anatomy of a Riot)", which was added to the now out-of-print 1996 CD edition, was originally featured on New View!.

The album is mentioned in 1995 Charles Burnett's short film When It Rains. Music critic Ralph J. Gleason called the lineup on the album "an exciting group and one of that will make jazz history". Notwithstanding the praises and its relevance, Recorded Live at the Monterey Jazz Festival still remains a little-known album.

== Critical reception ==
Professional ratings
Review scores
Source	Rating
The Penguin Guide to Jazz Recordings	3/4 stars

This album is number 67 in a list titled "The 100 Jazz Albums That Shook the World", published by Jazzwise.

It was accorded five stars in The Encyclopedia of Popular Music.

== Track listing ==
All compositions by John Handy.

1. "If Only We Knew" - 27:29
2. "Spanish Lady" - 19:31
3. "Tears of Ole Miss (Anatomy of a Riot)" - 23:37 Bonus track on CD reissue, recorded on June 28, 1967 at Village Gate, New York City

== Personnel ==
- John Handy – alto saxophone
- Mike White – violin
- Jerry Hahn – guitar
- Don Thompson – bass
- Terry Clarke – drums

On bonus track

- John Handy – alto saxophone
- Bobby Hutcherson - vibraphone
- Pat Martino - guitar
- Albert Stinson - bass
- Doug Sides - drums
