= Hear to Tempt You =

Studio album by the Temptations
- Released: November 10, 1977
- Recorded: 1977
- Studio: Atlantic, New York City, New York, US (vocals); Sigma Sound, Philadelphia, Pennsylvania, US (horns, rhythm, and strings)
- Genre: Soul
- Length: 39:53
- Language: English
- Label: Atlantic
- Producer: Ron Baker; Norman Harris

The Temptations chronology
The Temptations Do the Temptations (1976)	Hear to Tempt You (1977)	Bare Back (1978)

Hear to Tempt You is a 1977 studio album from American soul group the Temptations.

== Recording ==
This was the first of two albums they recorded for Atlantic Records after temporarily leaving Motown after being with the label since 1961. They would team up with Philadelphia producer Norman Harris for this album. After parting ways with Dennis Edwards, the group recruited new member Louis Price to be the new lead vocalist. They would also work for the first time with Ron Tyson of the group Love Committee who co-wrote most of the songs on this album. Tyson himself would later become a Temptation in 1983, replacing Glenn Leonard.

== Reception ==
Professional ratings
Review scores
Source	Rating
The Rolling Stone Album Guide	2/5 stars

The Bay State Banner called "In a Lifetime" "a classic piece of mid-tempo Philly disco combined with the great feel of the Temptations vocals". Editors at AllMusic Guide scored this album three out of five stars, with reviewer Jason Elias writing that "what's here is worth listening to" for the Norman Harris-produced tracks.

== Track listing ==
All tracks produced by Ron Baker, Norman Harris and Earl Young. Tall "T" executive producers.

Side one
No.	Title	Writer(s)	Lead singer(s)	Length
1.	"Think for Yourself"	Allan Felder, Norman Harris, and Ron Tyson	Louis Price	5:00
2.	"In a Lifetime"	Ron Baker, and Tyson	Glenn Leonard	6:13
3.	"Come Share My Love"	T. G. Conway, and Bruce Gray	Price	6:13
4.	"She's All I Got"	Baker, and Tyson	Price	4:56

Side two
No.	Title	Writer(s)	Lead singer(s)	Length
1.	"Snake in the Grass"	Conway, Felder, and Tyson	Richard Street	5:30
2.	"It's Time for Love"	Felder, Harris, and Tyson	Leonard and Price	4:31
3.	"Let's Live in Peace"	Melvin Franklin, Leonard, Price, Street, Otis Williams, and Benjamin Wright	Price	4:16
4.	"Read Between the Lines"	Conway, Felder, and Tyson	Williams	3:21
5.	"I Could Never Stop Loving You"	Felder, Harris, and Tyson	Franklin	3:21

== Personnel ==
The Temptations

- Melvin Franklin – bass vocals
- Glenn Leonard – first tenor/falsetto vocals
- Louis Price – second tenor/baritone vocals
- Richard Street – tenor vocals
- Otis Williams – second tenor/baritone vocals

Additional musicians

- Richard Adderly – vibraphone
- Ron Baker – bass guitar
- Keith Benson – drums
- T. G. Conway – keyboards, arrangement on "Come Share My Love" and "Snake in the Grass"
- Don Renaldo & His String & Horn Section – strings, horns
- Bobby Eli – guitar
- Michael Foreman – bass guitar
- Bruce Gray – keyboards
- Norman Harris – guitar; arrangement on "Think for Yourself" and "I Could Never Stop Loving You"; production on "Think for Yourself", "Come Share My Love", "Snake in the Grass", "It's Time for Love", "Let's Live in Peace", "Read Between the Lines", and "I Could Never Stop Loving You"
- Cotton Kent – keyboards
- Ron "Have Mercy" Kersey – keyboards, arrangement on "It's Time for Love" and "Read Between the Lines"
- T. J. Tindall – guitar
- Larry Washington – congas
- Earl Young – drums

Technical personnel

- Ron Baker – arrangement on "In a Lifetime" and "She's All I Got", production on "In a Lifetime" and "She's All I Got"
- Roland Chambers – arrangement on "Let's Live in Peace"
- Bob Defrin – art direction
- Dirk Devlin – engineering
- Carl Paruolo – engineering
- Bobby Warner – engineering
- Steinbicker/Houghton – photography

== Chart performance ==
Hear to Tempt You spent 13 weeks on the Billboard 200, peaking at 113 on January 7, 1978, and spent 10 weeks on the Billboard Top R&B/Hip Hop Albums (then named the Soul LP's) chart, reaching up to 38 on December 24, 1977.

== See also ==
- List of 1977 albums
