= Academy of Performing Arts =

Academy of Performing Arts or Academy for Performing Arts may refer to:

- Academy of Performing Arts Baden-Wuerttemberg in Ludwigsburg, Germany
- Academy of Performing Arts in Belgrade, Serbia
- Academy of Performing Arts in Bratislava, Slovakia
- Academy of Performing Arts Ernst Busch in Berlin, Germany
- Academy of Performing Arts in Ljubljana, Slovenia
- Academy of Performing Arts in Prague, Czech Republic
- Academy of Performing Arts in Sarajevo, Bosnia and Herzegovina
- Academy of Performing Arts in Tel Aviv, Israel
- Academy of Performing Arts in Hamilton, New Zealand
- Arizona Academy of the Performing Arts in Phoenix, Arizona, US
- Darpana Academy of Performing Arts in Ahmedabad, Gujarat, India
- Greater Hartford Academy of the Arts (formerly The Greater Hartford Academy of the Performing Arts, GHAPA) in Hartford, Connecticut, US
- The Hong Kong Academy for Performing Arts in China
- Janáček Academy of Music and Performing Arts in Brno, Czech Republic
- Maui Academy of Performing Arts (MAPA) in Maui, Hawai'i, US
- National Academy of Performing Arts (NAPA) in Karachi, Sindh, Pakistan
- Northern Academy of Performing Arts in Kingston upon Hull, England
- Royal Academy of Performing Arts (RAPA) in Thimphu, Bhutan
- Subramaniam Academy of Performing Arts in Bangalore, Karnataka, India
- Union County Academy for Performing Arts in Scotch Plains, New Jersey, US
- Western Australian Academy of Performing Arts (WAAPA) in Perth, Australia
