= Bare Back =

Studio album by the Temptations
- Released: September 20, 1978
- Recorded: 1978
- Studio: Kendun Recorders, Burbank, California, United States; Studio Masters, Los Angeles, California, United States; Wally Heider Studio #4, Los Angeles, California, United States
- Genre: Soul
- Length: 34:32
- Language: English
- Label: Atlantic
- Producer: Brian Holland

The Temptations chronology
Hear to Tempt You (1977)	Bare Back (1978)	Power (1980)

Bare Back is a 1978 studio album from American soul group the Temptations. This was the second of two albums they recorded for Atlantic Records after temporarily leaving Motown after being with the label since 1961 and the last with vocalist Louis Price, as Dennis Edwards would return to the group when they re-signed with Motown in 1980.

== Reception ==
Editors at AllMusic Guide scored this album 1.5 out of five stars, with reviewer Andrew Hamilton writing that "there's not much to recommend on the Temptations' second Atlantic record release" and blaming lackluster production, summing up that "the songs are arguably the weakest ever recorded by the Tempts".

== Track listing ==
Side one
No.	Title	Writer(s)	Lead singer(s)	Length
1.	"Mystic Woman (Love Me Over)"	Richard Davis, Brian Holland, Eddie Holland	Glenn Leonard, Richard Street	3:57
2.	"I Just Don't Know How to Let You Go"	B. Holland, E. Holland, Marcia Woods	Louis Price, Street	3:31
3.	"That's When You Need Love"	Davis, B. Holland, E. Holland	Price	3:44
4.	"Bare Back"	Harold Beatty, B. Holland, E. Holland	Street, Leonard	3:34
5.	"Ever Ready Love"	Beatty, B. Holland, E. Holland	Leonard	4:15

Side two
No.	Title	Writer(s)	Lead singer(s)	Length
6.	"Wake Up to Me"	Beatty, E. Holland, Woods	Leonard	4:17
7.	"You're So Easy to Love"	Beatty, B. Holland, E. Holland	Melvin Franklin	3:29
8.	"I See My Child"	Franklin, Leonard, Street, Otis Williams, Ben Wright	Otis Williams, Price	4:11
9.	"Touch Me Again"	Beatty, B. Holland, E. Holland	Street	3:34

== Personnel ==
The Temptations

- Melvin Franklin – vocals
- Glenn Leonard – vocals
- Louis Price – vocals
- Richard Street – vocals
- Otis Williams – vocals

Additional musicians

- Wali Ali – guitar
- Ben Adkins – bass guitar
- Ben Benay – guitar
- George Bohanon – trombone
- Oscar Brashear – trumpet
- Michael Broddicker – synthesizer
- Eddie "Bongo" Brown – percussion
- Rodney J. Brown – trumpet
- Ronnie Coleman – electric piano
- M. Creary – trombone
- Vincent DeRosa – French horn
- Stafford Floyd – trombone
- William Green – woodwinds
- John Hargrove – woodwinds
- Terry Harrington – woodwinds
- Walter Johnson – trumpet
- Barbara Konn – French horn
- Arthur Maebe – French horn
- Tim May – guitar
- Sidney Muldrow – French horn
- Tony Newton – bass guitar
- Sylvester Rivers – piano
- Marilyn Robinson – French horn
- Ernest Watts – woodwinds
- Bob Zimmitti – percussion

Technical personnel

- Don Blake – recording
- Harry Bluestone – strings concertmaster
- Richard Davis – album coordination
- Bob Defrin – art direction
- Quentin Dennard – drums
- Darnell Grays – album and production coordination
- Brian Holland – production
- Eddie Holland – executive production
- L. T. Horn – editing
- Jim Houghton – photography
- McKinley Jackson – rhythm arrangement on "Mystic Woman (Love Me Over)", "I Just Don't Know How to Let You Go", "That's When You Need Love", "Bare Back", "Ever Ready Love", and "Touch Me Again"; production coordination
- Joe Laux – assistant engineering
- Barney Perkins – recording, remix engineering
- Paul Riser – horn and string arrangement, rhythm arrangement on "Wake Up to Me", "You're So Easy to Love", and "I See My Child"

== Chart performance ==
Bare Back four weeks on the Billboard Top R&B/Hip Hop Albums (then named the Soul LP's) chart, reaching up to 46 on October 21, 1978.

== See also ==
- List of 1978 albums
