= Power (Temptations album) =

Studio album by the Temptations
- Released: April 18, 1980
- Recorded: 1979
- Studio: Golden Sound; Group IV Audio, Inc.; Hitsville U.S.A. Recording Studios; Jennifudy Studios North Hollywood, CA
- Genre: Soul
- Length: 37:42
- Language: English
- Label: Gordy
- Producer: Angelo Bond; Berry Gordy; Teddy Randazzo; William Weatherspoon

The Temptations chronology
Bare Back (1978)	Power (1980)	Give Love at Christmas (1980)

Power is a 1980 studio album from American soul group the Temptations, their return to Motown after a brief contract with Atlantic Records. Dennis Edwards also returned to the group after Louis Price, who recorded during the Atlantic period, left.

== Reception ==
Editors at AllMusic Guide scored this album three out of five stars, with reviewer Craig Lytle writing that "the group was, for the most part, missing in action on this album", but noting fine vocal performances.

== Track listing ==
Track list
No.	Title	Leads	Length
1.	"Power" (Angelo Bond, Berry Gordy, and Jean Mayer)	Melvin Franklin, Dennis Edwards, Glenn Leonard, Richard Street	6:07
2.	"Struck by Lightning Twice" (Bond, Ronald Weatherspoon, and William Weatherspoon)	Dennis Edwards, Melvin Franklin	4:14
3.	"Isn't the Night Fantastic" (Dennis Edwards, David English, Glenn Leonard, Richard Street, and Otis Williams)	Richard Street, Melvin Franklin, Dennis Edwards	4:15
4.	"How Can I Resist Your Love" (Bond, W. Weatherspoon)	Dennis Edwards, Melvin Franklin	3:55
5.	"Shadow of Your Love" (Teddy Randazzo and Tony Travaglini)	Dennis Edwards	4:40
6.	"Can't You See Sweet Thing" (Edwards, English, Leonard, Street, and Williams)	Otis Williams, Glenn Leonard, Dennis Edwards	6:09
7.	"Go for It" (Bond, R. Weatherspoon, and W. Weatherspoon)	Glenn Leonard	4:24
8.	"I'm Coming Home" (Edwards, English, Leonard, Street, and Williams)	Dennis Edwards	4:10

== Personnel ==
The Temptations

- Dennis Edwards
- Melvin Franklin
- Glenn Leonard
- Richard Street
- Otis Williams

Additional musicians

- John Arnold – percussion
- Eddie "Bongo" Brown – percussion
- Reginald "Sonny" Burke – keyboards
- Eric Butler – keyboards
- Gary Coleman – percussion
- Quentin Dennard – drums
- James Gadson – drums
- Paul M. Jackson Jr. – guitar
- Tim May – guitar
- Melvin "Wah Wah" Ragin – guitar
- Anthony Travaglini – guitar
- Earl Van Dyke – keyboards
- David T. Walker – guitar
- "Ready" Freddie Washington – bass guitar
- Nathan Watts – bass guitar

Technical personnel

- Tony Autore – assistant recording
- Angelo Bond – production on "Struck by Lightning Twice" and "Go for It"
- Bobby Brooks – assistant recording
- Guy Costa – recording
- Mike Diehl – cover, design, illustration
- Berry Gordy – mixing engineering, production, executive production
- Lawrence T. Horn – recording
- Suzee Wendy Ikeda – project management
- McKinley Jackson – rhythm arrangement
- Ginny Livingston – art direction
- Dave Mancini – assistant recording
- Greg Orloff – assistant recording
- Gene Page – horn and string arrangement on "How Can I Resist Your Love"
- Barney Perkins – recording, mixing engineering
- Teddy Randazzo – arrangement on "How Can I Resist Your Love" and "Shadow of Your Love", production on "How Can I Resist Your Love" and "Shadow of Your Love"
- Paul Ring – assistant mixing engineering
- Paul Riser – horn and string arrangement on "How Can I Resist Your Love"
- Bob Robitaille – recording, mixing engineering
- Ron Slenzak – photography
- William Weatherspoon – production on "Struck by Lightning Twice" and "Go for It"
- Ronald Wakefield – photography
- Steve Williams – recording

== Chart performance ==
Power spent 14 weeks on the Billboard 200, peaking at 45 on July 12, 1980, and spent 22 weeks on the Billboard Top R&B/Hip Hop Albums chart, reaching up to 13 on June 14, 1980.

== See also ==
- List of 1980 albums
