= Bindu Subramaniam =

American singer

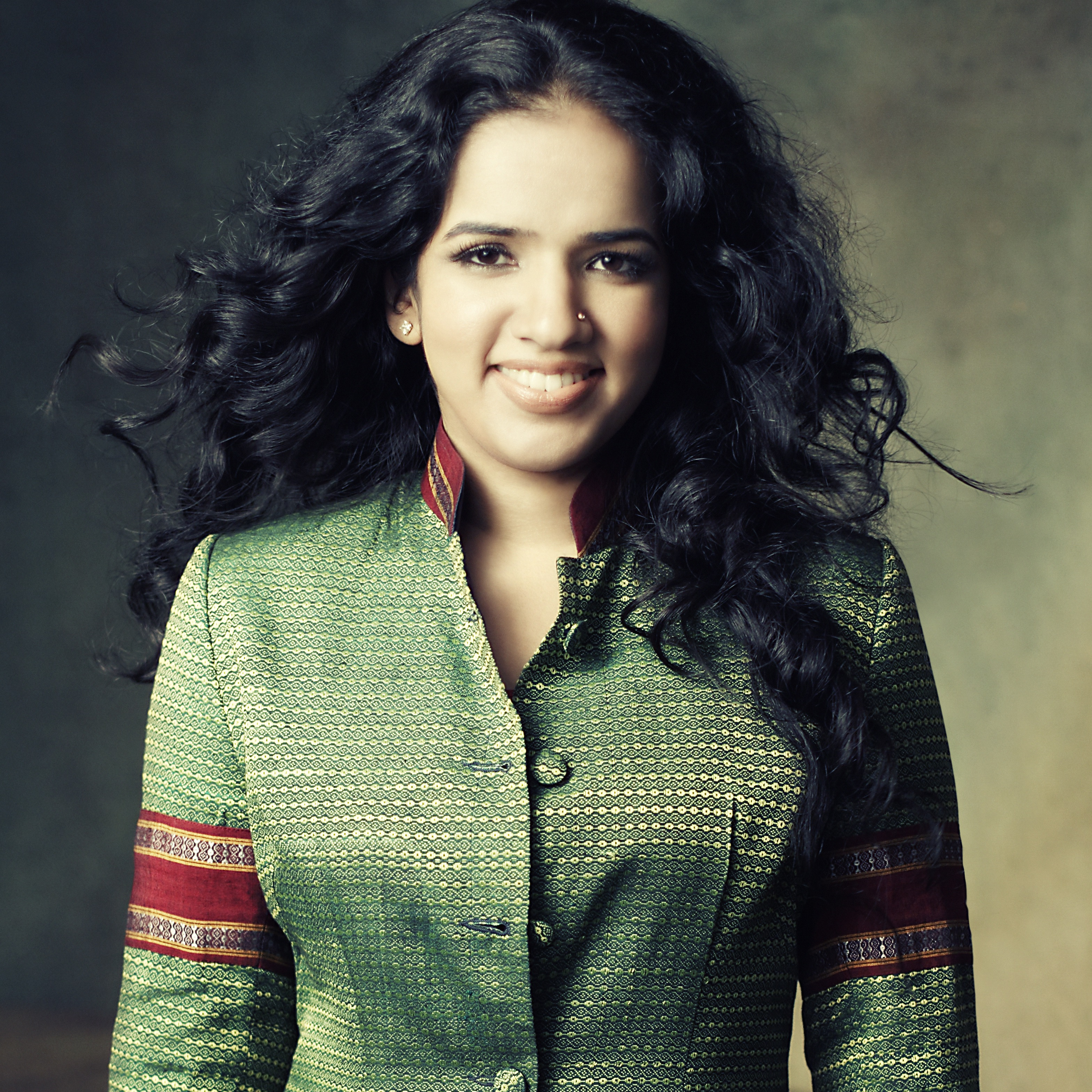

Background information
- Born: Seetaa Subramaniam; Los Angeles, United States
- Genres: Western music, Carnatic, Pop
- Occupations: Singer/Songwriter, Educator, Entrepreneur
- Instrument: Piano
- Years active: 1997–present

Bindu Subramaniam (born Seetaa Subramaniam; in Los Angeles) is an American singer-songwriter, entrepreneur, music educator, and Co-Founder and CEO of SaPa - Subramaniam Academy of Performing Arts. Bindu has been described as a "third generation prodigy" by the Hindustan Times, "a Bangalore woman changing the way children learn" by Femina Karnataka magazine and an "assured young soprano" by the Times of India. In 2012, she appeared on the list of 12 gen-next achievers in Verve Magazine. In 2021, she was listed as GQ Magazine's 25 most influential young Indians. She also appeared on BusinessWorld's list of women achievers, and was named in their list of 40 under 40.

She has performed around the world, and her first solo album was critically acclaimed and nominated for a GiMA.

Bindu heads the Subramaniam Academy of Performing Arts (SaPa), an institute that trains musically inclined children to become professional performers. In 2014, she started the SaPa in Schools program, an initiative to integrate music into the mainstream academic curriculum. SaPa in Schools works with over 30,000 children across India (as of 2021).

She is the daughter of violinist Dr. L. Subramaniam, and has collaborated with him on a number of releases including Global Fusion, Visions of India and Athens. Along with her brother Ambi Subramaniam, she started a contemporary world music band, SubraMania in 2013. In 2018, she created The Thayir Sadam Project with Ambi, Carnatic fusion artist Mahesh Raghvan and mridangam player Akshay Anantapadmanabhan.

== Career ==
=== Music career and performances ===
Bindu was born in United States and shifted to India with her family when she was in sixth grade. She wrote her first song at 7, and first performed on stage in Norway when she was 12 years old. She won honourable mentions at the 16th and 17th Billboard World Song Contest for her original compositions and was a semi-finalist in the performance category of the Unisong World Song Contest.

In 2010, she was part of Dr. L. Subramaniam's ensemble that won a GiMA for Best Fusion Album for the album Live in Leipzig. She released her first solo album, Surrender, in 2011, which was nominated for a GiMA in the category of Best Pop/Rock Album.

In 2013, Bindu started a fusion band, SubraMania, along with Ambi Subramaniam. SubraMania has performed live in many cities across India and toured in seven European countries. The band has collaborated with Hubert Laws, Oystein Baadsvik, Lesle Lewis, and Bollywood composer Aadesh Srivastav. SubraMania's music has been described as a "mammoth success" by the Asian Age, and their performance at the Jaipur Literature Festival in 2018 was described as "one of the major highlights" of the festival by Firstpost.

In 2018, Bindu and Ambi collaborated with Carnatic fusion artist Mahesh Raghvan to create The Thayir Sadam Project. The Thayir Sadam Project has released tracks in collaboration with Carnatic singing duo Ranjani-Gayathri, and created an Indian cover of A Million Dreams to promote the United Nations' Sustainable Development Goals. They have been described as "a talented troupe" by the Times of India (Economic Times), and have performed live in major Indian cities. As of 2018, The Thayir Sadam Project has conducted workshops with over 5000 students, teaching them global music and promoting initiatives like the United Nations' Sustainable Development Goals (SDGs) via the 10,000 deeds campaign.

In 2020, Bindu took the SaPa curriculum online, with an online learning platform hosting self-paced courses by Dr. L Subramaniam, Kavita Krishnamurti Subramaniam, Anup Jhalota, Russ Miller and more.

=== Music education ===
Bindu is the Dean of Subramaniam Academy of Performing Arts (SaPa), an institute of Indian and global music founded by Dr. L. Subramaniam and Kavita Krishnamurti in 2007. Bindu took over as Dean in 2011, and created a curriculum that would train children as young as three years old to learn music. She founded the SaPa in Schools program in 2014, as an initiative to integrate music into the mainstream academic curriculum. The program works with 30,000 children.

Bindu's goal for SaPa in Schools was to create an ecosystem for music education in India. The program was supported by the Infosys Foundation and is currently partnered with the Akshaya Patra Foundation.

Bindu co-hosts The SaPa Show, a weekly television program aimed at teaching children Indian and global music. Earlier in 2019, she co-authored India's first series of textbooks dedicated to teaching the Indian violin. She is currently working on offering undergraduate courses in music education, technology, and performance.

Bindu writes a weekly column called "Tuning In" in the New Indian Express.

== Education ==
Bindu has a bachelor's degree in Law from Jain University, a master's degree in law from the University of London, a master's certificate in songwriting and music business from Berklee Music, a diploma in Montessori education from NAMC and a PhD in music education. She is a part of the Stanford Seed Transformation Program (cohort of 2020).

== Awards and achievements ==
Bindu has received Honourable Mentions at the Billboard World Song Contest and was a finalist in the performance category of the Unisong International Song Contest. She was nominated for a GiMA (Indian equivalent of the Grammys) for Best Pop Rock Album in 2011 and won a GiMA for Best Fusion Album – Live at Neues Gewandhaus, Leipzig in 2010.

She is a member of the All India Management Association's Young Leaders Council, and was a delegate of the Australia India Youth Dialogue in 2018. She was also invited to Israel in 2018, as part of the delegation that contributed to advancing India-Israeli ties. In 2021, she delivered a TEDx talk for students from Woodstock School, titled "What do you want to be when you grow up?"

== Personal life ==
Bindu was born as Seetaa Subramaniam in Los Angeles, California, to violinist L. Subramaniam and vocalist Vijayashree (Viji) Subramaniam. She has two brothers: violinist Ambi Subramaniam and Dr. Narayana Subramaniam – head and neck oncologist, author and musician. She moved to Bangalore, India with her family in 1996, after the death of her mother. Her father married Bollywood playback singer Kavita Krishnamurti in 1999.

She legally changed her name from Seetaa to Bindu in 2009.

Bindu is married to Sanjeev Nayak, Swarathma's lead violinist. She has a daughter, Mahati Subramaniam, born in 2011, who recorded her first solo song in 2018.

== Discography ==
Year	Release	Main Artist	Track(s)	Format
1999	Global Fusion	L. Subramaniam	Harmony of the Hearts	Audio
2003	Best of Subramaniam	L. Subramaniam	Ragupati Raghava	Audio
2004	Athens	L. Subramaniam, Kavita Krishnamurti, Bindu Subramaniam	The Prayer, Let there Be, Lau se lau Jalti Hai (song for 2004 olympics)	Audio
2007	Visions of India	L. Subramaniam	Vaishnava Janato, Visions of India	Audio
2011	Surrender	Bindu Subramaniam	Autumn Leaves (ft. Dr. L Subramaniam, Where Are You, Wake Up Rebecca, Superstar, My Sad Thoughts, Surrender, Is She Looking At Me, Finding My Way, I Don't Have Your Answers, Where Are You (Radio Edit)	Audio
2012	LGMF 10 DVD set	L. Subramaniam	Visions of India	Audio
2013	Halo (single)	Bindu Subramaniam		Audio
2016	Days in the Sun (single)	SubraMania		Music Video
2016	Esperanza (single)	SubraMania		Music Video
2017	You Were There	SubraMania	Let There Be, Midnight Musings, Peacock, Thillana, Be Free, You Were There, Make It Count, 7 Song, Bhamma Bhamma	Audio
2018	Something Just Like This – Indian Mix (single)	The Thayir Sadam Project		Music Video
2018	A Million Dreams – Indian Mix (single)	The Thayir Sadam Project		Music Video
2018	Crazy Little Thing Called Chakravakam (single)	The Thayir Sadam Project		Music Video
2018	Superheroes Without Capes (single)	The Thayir Sadam Project		Music Video
2018	Stargazer (single)	SubraMania		Music Video
2018	Mirage	SubraMania (ft. Jorge Pardo)		
2018	Perfect | Ed Sheeran Cover	SubraMania (ft. Varun Murali)		
2019	Margazhi Reloaded – Dwijwanti Tillana (single)	The Thayir Sadam Project		Music Video
2019	Swarabindu Thillana (single)	The Thayir Sadam Project		Music Video
2019	Loka Samasta	The Thayir Sadam Project ft. Aruna Sairam		
2019	City of Stars | Acoustic Mix	Bindu Subramaniam		
2019	Tears in Heaven | Acoustic Cover	Bindu Subramaniam		
2019	I'm With You | Acoustic Cover	Bindu Subramaniam		
2019	Almost Lover | Acoustic Cover	Bindu Subramaniam		
2019	New Light | Acoustic Cover	Bindu Subramaniam		
2019	Need You Now | Acoustic Cover	Bindu Subramaniam		
2020	Beyond Borders	Dr. L Subramaniam	Apna Street, When It's Dark, Beyond Borders	
2020	At the Door	The Thayir Sadam Project		
2020	How Would I Know	SubraMania ft. Shashank Subramanyam		
2021	Syncopy	SubraMania ft. U Rajesh		
2021	Cover Me in Sunshine	Bindu Subramaniam ft. Mahati Subramaniam		
2021	Love Story | Acoustic Cover	Bindu Subramaniam		
2021	Save Your Tears | Acoustic Cover	Bindu Subramaniam		
2021	Space Between	Bindu Subramaniam ft. Mahati Subramaniam		
2021	Shenandoah | Cover	Bindu Subramaniam & Ambi Subramaniam		
2021	Bella Ciao (Money Heist Cover)	Bindu Subramaniam, Ambi Subramaniam		
