= Eddie Brown (musician) =

American musician (1932–1984)

Background information
- Born: Edward James Brown; September 13, 1932; Clarksdale, Mississippi, U.S.
- Died: December 28, 1984 (aged 52) Los Angeles, California, U.S.
- Genres: R&B; soul
- Occupation: Musician
- Instrument: Percussion
- Years active: 1962–1984
- Label: Motown
- Formerly of: The Funk Brothers

Edward James "Bongo" Brown (September 13, 1932 – December 28, 1984) was an American percussionist known for his work with The Funk Brothers, Detroit-based session musicians who performed the backing to most Motown recordings from 1959 to 1972.

== Biography ==
Brown was born in Clarksdale, Mississippi on September 13, 1932. He was raised in Memphis, Tennessee. He later moved to Detroit and in 1962 he joined the Funk Brothers, Motown Records' in-house session musicians. According to Jack Ashford, Brown started out as a valet for Marvin Gaye and played bongos once Gaye began performing on-stage. Brown played congas, bongos, the gourd and claves. Brown became Motown's leading percussionist and for a decade was on almost every key release from the label. He was known for his sense of humor and for being the "studio clown". Despite being an excellent musician, he could not read music and when handed sheet music by the producers, he would replace it with an adult magazine. When Motown moved to Los Angeles in 1972, Brown came along. His credits there included Gaye's 1973 album Let's Get It On and Stevie Wonder's 1976 album Songs in the Key of Life. He later toured with both Gaye and Liza Minnelli. One of his musical influences was Chano Pozo.

Motown recordings on which Brown played include "(I Know) I'm Losing You" by the Temptations, "I Second That Emotion" by Smokey Robinson & the Miracles, "What's Going On" by Marvin Gaye, and "If I Were Your Woman" by Gladys Knight & the Pips.

Brown died from heart disease in Los Angeles, California, on December 28, 1984. He was 52.

== Discography ==
=== As sideman ===
With The Brothers Johnson

- Blam! (A&M, 1978)

With Randy Brown

- Intimately (Parachute, 1979)

With Peabo Bryson and Natalie Cole

- We're the Best of Friends (Capitol Records, 1979)

With G. C. Cameron

- You're What's Missing in My Life (Motown, 1977)

With Jean Carn

- Trust Me (Motown, 1982)

With Clarence Carter

- Real (ABC, 1974)

With Randy Crawford

- Now We May Begin (Warner Bros. Records, 1980)

With Commodores

- Natural High (Motown, 1978)
- Heroes (Motown, 1980)

With Priscilla Coolidge

- Flying (Capricorn, 1979)

With The 5th Dimension

- High on Sunshine (Motown, 1979)

With Yvonne Fair

- The Bitch Is Black (Motown, 1975)

With Brass Fever

- Brass Fever (Impulse!, 1975)
- Time Is Running Out (Impulse!, 1976)

With Four Tops

- Nature Planned It (Motown, 1972)
- Catfish (ABC, 1976)

With Marvin Gaye

- What's Going On (Motown Records, 1971)
- Let's Get It On (Motown Records, 1973)
- I Want You (Motown Records, 1976)
- Here, My Dear (Motown Records, 1978)

With Gloria Gaynor

- Stories (Polydor Records, 1980)

With Lesley Gore

- Love Me By Name (A&M, 1976)

With Kathe Green

- Kathe Green (Motown, 1976)

With John Handy

- Hard Work (Impulse, 1976)
- Carnival (Impulse, 1977)

With High Inergy

- Steppin' Out (Gordy, 1978)
- Hold On (Gordy, 1980)
- High Inergy (Gordy, 1981)
- So Right (Gordy, 1982)

With Thelma Houston

- Ready to Roll (Motown Records, 1978)
- Ride to the Rainbow (Motown Records, 1979)

With Thelma Houston and Jerry Butler

- Thelma & Jerry (Motown, 1977)

With Phyllis Hyman

- Can't We Fall in Love Again? (Arista, 1981)

With Chuck Jackson

- I Wanna Give You Some Love (EMI, 1980)

With La Toya Jackson

- La Toya Jackson (Polydor, 1980)

With Al Johnson

- Back for More (Columbia, 1980)

With Gloria Jones

- Windstorm (Capitol Records, 1978)

With Margie Joseph

- Hear the Words, Feel the Feeling (Cotillon, 1976)

With Eddie Kendricks

- People...Hold On (Tamla, 1972)
- The Hit Man (Tamla, 1975)

With B. B. King

- King Size (ABC Records, 1977)

With Ben E. King

- Let Me Live in Your Life (Atlantic Records, 1978)

With Gladys Knight & the Pips

- At Last... The Pips (Casablanca, 1977)

With Johnny Mathis

- Mathis Magic (Columbia, 1979)

With The Miracles

- City of Angels (Tamla, 1975)
- The Power of Music (Tamla, 1976)

With Barbara Morrison

- Love Is a Four-Letter Word (Esoteric, 1984)

With The Originals

- California Street (Motown, 1975)
- Communique (Soul, 1976)
- Down to Love Town (Soul, 1978)

With Ray Parker Jr.

- Woman Out of Control (Arista Records, 1983)

With Peaches & Herb

- Worth the Wait (Polydor, 1980)

With Wilson Pickett

- Don't Knock My Love (Atlantic Records, 1971)

With Billy Preston and Syreeta Wright

- Billy Preston & Syreeta (Motown Records, 1981)

With Helen Reddy

- Play Me Out (MCA Records, 1981)

With Martha Reeves

- Gotta Keep Moving (Fantasy Records, 1980)

With Rockie Robbins

- You and Me (A&M, 1980)

With Smokey Robinson

- Where There's Smoke... (Tamla, 1979)

With Kenny Rogers

- Share Your Love (Liberty Records, 1981)

With David Ruffin

- Me 'n Rock 'n Roll Are Here to Stay (Motown, 1974)

With Jimmy Ruffin

- Jimmy Ruffin (Polydor, 1973)
- Love Is All We Need (Polydor, 1975)

With Patrice Rushen

- Posh (Elektra Records, 1980)

With Lara Saint Paul

- Saffo Music (Lasapa, 1977)

With Bob Seger

- Smokin' O.P.'s (Reprise Records, 1972)
- Back in '72 (Reprise Records, 1973)

With Marlena Shaw

- Sweet Beginnings (Columbia, 1977)

With Carly Simon

- Playing Possum (Elektra Records, 1975)

With Edwin Starr

- Stronger than You Think I Am (20th Century Fox, 1980)

With Candi Staton

- Young Hearts Run Free (Warner Bros. Records, 1976)
- House of Love (Warner Bros. Records, 1978)

With The Supremes

- Floy Joy (Motown, 1972)
- High Energy (Motown, 1976)
- Mary, Scherrie & Susaye (Motown, 1976)

With Tavares

- Supercharged (Capitol, 1980)

With The Temptations

- Puzzle People (Gordy, 1969)
- Psychedelic Shack (Gordy, 1970)
- Sky's the Limit (Gordy, 1971)
- Solid Rock (Gordy, 1972)
- All Directions (Gordy, 1972)
- Masterpiece (Gordy, 1973)
- The Temptations Do The Temptations (Gordy, 1976)
- Bare Back (Gordy, 1978)
- Power (Gordy, 1980)
- Back to Basics (Gordy, 1983)

With Jean Terrell

- I Had to Fall in Love (A&M, 1978)

With Tower of Power

- Back on the Streets (Columbia, 1979)

With The Undisputed Truth

- Face to Face with the Truth (Gordy, 1972)
- Law of the Land (Gordy, 1973)
- Down to Earth (Gordy, 1974)
- Cosmic Truth (Gordy, 1975)
- Higher Than High (Gordy, 1975)

With Leon Ware

- Musical Massage (Gordy, 1976)
- Leon Ware (Elektra, 1982)

With Deniece Williams

- When Love Comes Calling (Columbia Records, 1978)

With Lenny Williams

- Spark of Love (ABC, 1978)

With Bobby Womack

- Roads of Life (Arista, 1979)
- The Poet (Beverly Glen, 1981)
- Someday We'll All Be Free (Beverly Glen, 1985)

With Stevie Wonder

- Songs in the Key of Life (Motown, 1976)

With Syreeta Wright

- One to One (Motown Records, 1977)
- The Spell (Tamla Records, 1983)

With Michael Wycoff

- On the Line (RCA, 1983)

With Richard "Popcorn" Wylie

- Extrasensory Percepition (ABC, 1974)
