= Brass Fever =

American jazz musical ensemble

Brass Fever was an American jazz musical ensemble, which recorded two albums for Impulse! Records. Consisting of both session musicians and leaders such as Shelly Manne, their two albums covered jazz and R&B genres.

Their second album charted at #98 on the US Billboard R&B chart.

== Discography ==
- 1975: Brass Fever (Impulse!)
- 1976: Time Is Running Out (Impulse!)

== Personnel ==
- Flute - Buddy Collette
- Percussion - Eddie "Bongo" Brown
- Drums - Shelly Manne
- Electric Bass - Scott Edwards
- Electric Guitar - Lee Ritenour
- Electric Piano - Sonny Burke
- Alto Saxophone - John Handy
- Trombone - Charlie Loper, Garnett Brown, George Bohanon
- Trumpet - Oscar Brashear
- Piano, Organ, Clavinet - Phil Wright
- Conductor - Wade Marcus
- Arrangements - Esmond Edwards
