= Big Bad Bo =

Studio album by Bo Diddley
- Released: 1974
- Recorded: 1974
- Studio: Sound Exchange Studios and A&R Studios in New York City and Toronto Sound Studios, Toronto
- Genre: Funk
- Length: 31:42
- Label: Chess; CH 50047
- Producer: Esmond Edwards

Bo Diddley chronology
The London Bo Diddley Sessions (1973)	Big Bad Bo (1974)	The 20th Anniversary of Rock 'n' Roll (1973)

Big Bad Bo is the 18th studio album by musician Bo Diddley released by the Chess label in 1974.

== Reception ==
Professional ratings
Review scores
Source	Rating
AllMusic	2/5 stars

Allmusic awarded the album 2 stars with reviewer Bruce Eder stating "Having tried everything else in his search for a new sound, Bo moved into a jazz vein on this record, and the results are not bad, but not they're not really Bo, either. ... For the first time, the Bo Diddley beat appears nowhere on one of his albums".

== Track listing ==
1. "Bite You" (Tammi McDaniel, Terri Lynn) – 4:20
2. "He's Got All the Whiskey" (Bobby Charles) – 4:40
3. "Hit or Miss" (Odetta F. Gordon) – 3:40
4. "You've Got a Lot of Nerve" (Connie Redmond, Kay McDaniel) – 3:23
5. "Stop the Pusher" (Kay McDaniel) – 5:15
6. "Evelee" (Ellas McDaniel) – 6:23
7. "I've Been Workin'" (Van Morrison) – 4:50

== Personnel ==
- Bo Diddley – vocals, guitar
- Joe Newman, John Bello, Jon Faddis, Irvin Markowitz, Marvin Stamm – trumpet
- Dominick Gravine, Garnett Brown, Harry DiVito – trombone
- Tony Price – tuba
- Willis Jackson – tenor saxophone
- John Leone – baritone saxophone
- Michael Pickett – harmonica
- Carl Lynch, John Tropea – guitar
- Ernest Hayes – electric piano
- Wilbur Bascomb Jr. – electric bass
- Jimmy Johnson Jr. – drums
- Esmond Edwards, Montego Joe – percussion
- J. R. Bailey, Ken Williams, Melvin Kent – backing vocals
- Wade Marcus – horn arrangement and conducting
- Gene Bianco – conductor
