= In the Vernacular =

Studio album by John Handy III
- Released: 1958
- Recorded: 1958; New York City
- Genre: Jazz
- Length: 37:18
- Label: Roulette; SR 52042
- Producer: Teddy Reig

John Handy III chronology
| In the Vernacular (1958) | No Coast Jazz (1960) |

In the Vernacular (stylised as in the ver•nac‘u•lar) is the debut album led by saxophonist John Handy III featuring tracks recorded in 1958 and originally released on the Roulette label.

== Reception ==
Professional ratings
Review scores
| Source | Rating |
|---|---|
| AllMusic | 4/5 stars |

AllMusic awarded the album 4 stars and its review by Scott Yanow calls it "Excellent advanced hard bop music".

== Track listing ==
All compositions by John Handy III except as indicated

1. "I'll Close My Eyes" (Billy Reid) - 3:06
2. "First Time" - 7:03
3. "Suggested Line" - 5:30
4. "Problem Too" - 4:28
5. "Quote, Unquote" - 3:09
6. "Blues in the Vernacular" - 5:09
7. "Dance to the Lady" - 5:16
8. "I'll Never Smile Again" (Ruth Lowe) - 3:37

== Personnel ==
- John Handy III - alto saxophone
- Richard Williams - trumpet
- Roland Hanna - piano
- George Tucker - bass
- Bobby Fuhlrodt (track 2), Roy Haynes (tracks 1 & 3–8) - drums
