= Projections (John Handy album) =

Studio album by John Handy Concert Ensemble
- Released: 1968
- Recorded: April 15, 1968
- Studio: Columbia East 30th Street Studio, New York City
- Genre: Jazz
- Length: 44:52
- Label: Columbia; CS 9689
- Producer: John Hammond

John Handy III chronology
New View! (1967)	Projections (1968)	Karuna Supreme (1975)

Projections is an album by saxophonist John Handy's Concert Ensemble featuring tracks recorded in 1968 and originally released on the Columbia label.

== Reception ==
Professional ratings
Review scores
Source	Rating
AllMusic	4/5 stars

AllMusic awarded the album 4 stars and its review by Scott Yanow states, "The music (much more concise in general than on the previous two Columbias) contains plenty of surprises and is difficult to categorize (somewhere between the avant-garde and hard bop), although it does not reach the same heights as New View".

== Track listing ==
All compositions by John Handy

1. "Three in One" - 4:00
2. "Projections" - 3:15
3. "A Song of Uranus" - 9:03
4. "Senôra Nancye" - 6:30
5. "Dance to the Lady" - 7:22
6. "Sanpaku" - 2:27
7. "Eros" - 3:53
8. "All the Way to the West, By God, Virginia" - 8:08

== Personnel ==
- John Handy - alto saxophone, flute
- Michael White - violin
- Mike Nock - piano
- Bruce Cale - bass
- Larry Hancock - drums
