= Jazz (John Handy album) =

Studio album by John Handy III
- Released: 1962
- Recorded: 1962; New York City
- Genre: Jazz
- Label: Roulette; SR 52121
- Producer: Teddy Reig

John Handy III chronology
No Coast Jazz (1960)	Jazz (1962)	Recorded Live at the Monterey Jazz Festival (1966)

Jazz is an album by saxophonist John Handy III featuring tracks recorded in 1962 and originally released on the Roulette label.

== Reception ==
Professional ratings
Review scores
Source	Rating
AllMusic	3/5 stars

AllMusic awarded the album 3 stars and its review by Scott Yanow states, "Handy's appealing and already distinctive alto sound, combined with an exploratory style, resulted in this music having plenty of surprising moments".

== Track listing ==
All compositions by John Handy III except as indicated

1. "From Bird" - 5:50
2. "Blues for M.F." - 7:27
3. "East of the Sun (and West of the Moon)" (Brooks Bowman) - 7:54
4. "No Smiles Please" - 6:52
5. "Strugglin'" - 6:23
6. "Afternoon Outing" - 6:46

== Personnel ==
- John Handy III - alto saxophone
- Walter Bishop, Jr. - piano
- Julian Euell - bass
- Edgar Bateman - drums
