= Carnival (John Handy album) =

Studio album by John Handy
- Released: 1977
- Recorded: 1977
- Studio: A&R, New York City; ABC, Los Angeles, California
- Genre: Jazz
- Length: 42:04
- Label: ABC/Impulse; AS 9324
- Producer: Esmond Edwards

John Handy chronology
Hard Work (1976)	Carnival (1977)	Where Go the Boats (1978)

Carnival is an album by American jazz saxophonist John Handy which was recorded in 1977 and originally released on the ABC/Impulse label.

== Reception ==
Professional ratings
Review scores
Source	Rating
AllMusic	2/5 stars

AllMusic awarded the album 2 stars stating "Handy is mostly featured here in commercial settings, singing two songs and interacting with an electric rhythm section".

== Track listing ==
All compositions by John Handy except as indicated

1. "Carnival" – 3:25
2. "Alvina" – 6:11
3. "Watch Your Money Go" – 5:58
4. "I Will Leave You" – 5:15
5. "Love's Rejoycing" – 8:17
6. "Make Her Mine" – 4:10
7. "All the Things You Are" (Jerome Kern, Oscar Hammerstein II) – 2:43
8. "Christina's Little Song" – 6:05

== Personnel ==
- John Handy – alto saxophone, percussion, vocals, backing vocals
- Sonny Burke – keyboards, piano, synthesizer (tracks 1, 2, 4, 5 & 7)
- Lee Ritenour – guitar, keyboards, synthesizer (tracks 1, 6 & 8)
- George Spencer – keyboards (track 3)
- Larry Carlton (track 5), Mike Hoffmann (tracks 2–4) – guitar
- Rudy Coleman (tracks 1–4) James Jamerson (track 5) Vincent Jefferson (tracks 6 & 8) – bass
- James Gadson (tracks 1, 3 & 5), John Handy IV (tracks 2 & 4), Harold Jones (tracks 6 & 8) – drums
- Eddie "Bongo" Brown (tracks 1 & 5), Paulinho da Costa (tracks 6 & 8), Tom Nicholas (tracks 2–4) – congas
- Esmond Edwards – percussion, backing vocals (tracks 1, 4, 5 & 6)

Carol Guida Backing vocals (tracks 1 & 3)
