= Ambi Subramaniam =

American violinist (born 1991)

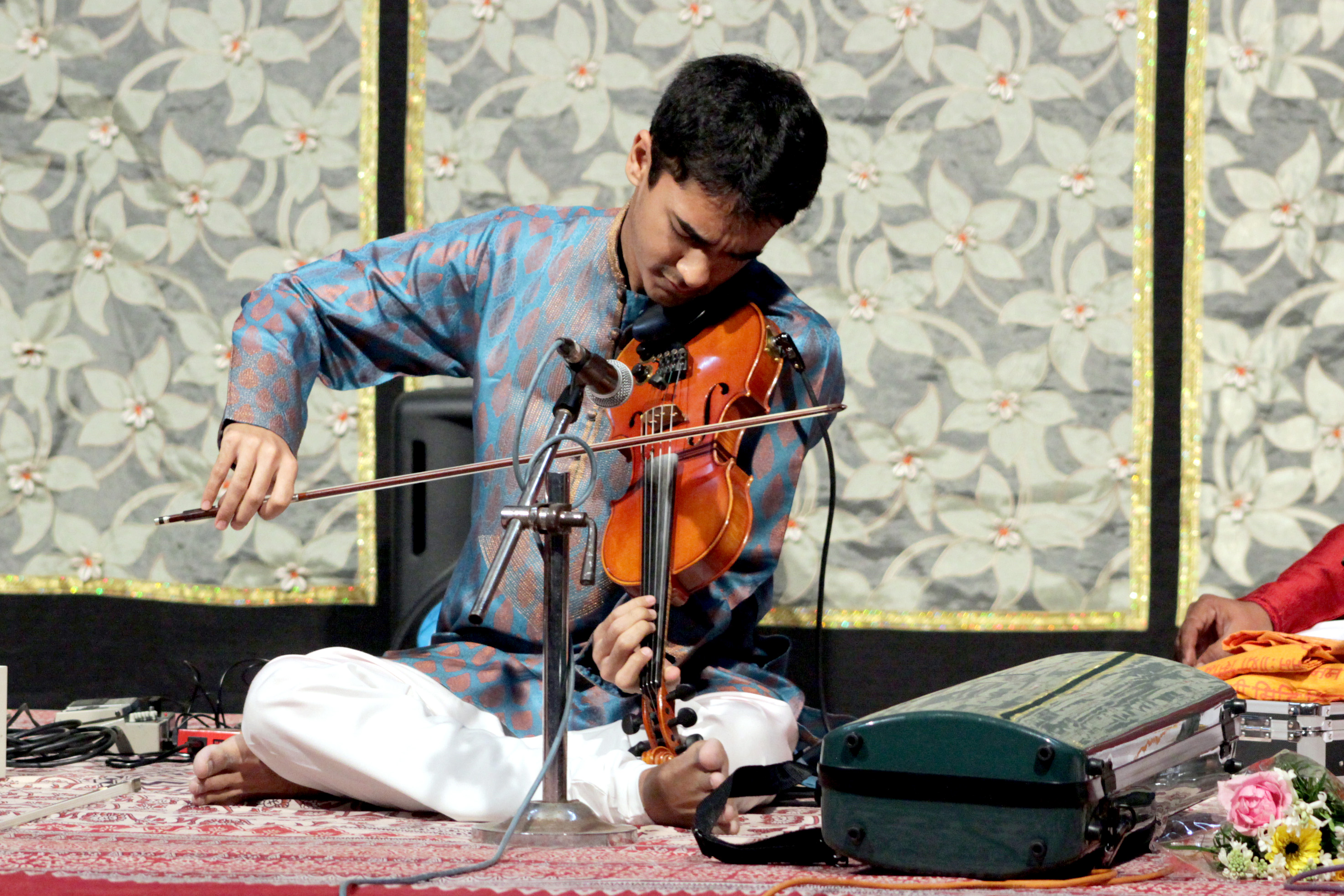

Background information
- Born: 5 August 1991 (age 35)
- Occupations: Violinist, composer, educator
- Instruments: Violin, piano
- Years active: 1997 – Present
- Website: ambi.in

Ambi Subramaniam (born 5 August 1991 Los Angeles, California, United States) is a violinist, composer, and educator. He started performing on stage when he was six years old and was described as the "new king of Indian classical violin" by the Times of India.

Ambi is the Associate Dean of the Subramaniam Academy of Performing Arts (SaPa), an institute that trains musically inclined children to become professional performers. In 2014, Ambi started the SaPa in Schools program with his sister, Bindu Subramaniam. SaPa in Schools is an initiative to integrate music into the mainstream academic curriculum, and works with 30,000 children in India.

Ambi's awards include the Ritz Icon of the Year Award, the Rotary Youth Award, two Global Indian Music Awards (GiMAs), and one BiMA. He was the three-time winner of the Philomena Thumbochetty Award for Best Western Classical Violinist, and received a golden violin from Sri Jayendra Saraswati when he was 18 years old. In 2021, he was named among GQ Magazine's 25 most influential young Indians.

Ambi is a youth delegate at the United Nations for the Sri Chinmoy Peace Meditation group.

== Early life ==
Ambi Subramaniam was born in Los Angeles, California, to violinist Dr. L Subramaniam and vocalist Vijayashree (Viji) Subramaniam. His sister, Bindu Subramaniam, is a singer/songwriter and educator and his brother, Dr. Narayana Subramaniam, is a head and neck oncologist, author and musician. Ambi moved to Bangalore, India with his family in 1996, after the death of his mother. His father married Bollywood playback singer Kavita Krishnamurti in 1999.

== Education ==
Ambi ranked first at the Board Royal School of Music's violin exams, which he took in 2005. He also received distinctions in piano and Western music theory, and was the three-time winner of the Philomena Thumbochetty Award for Best Western Classical Violinist.

Ambi completed his BBM from Sri Bhagawan Mahaveer Jain College, which comes under the umbrella of Jain University Bangalore. He completed his MBA at RIMS, Bangalore, and has a PhD in music.

== Career ==
=== Early Years ===
Ambi first sang on stage when he was six years old, and gave his first violin performance at the age of seven in Colombo, Sri Lanka, at the Indian Embassy. In 1999, he performed at the Necklace Road, Hyderabad, to an audience of 200,000. He performed alongside the Venga Boys as part of the Pepsi Live Concert in 2000.

Ambi started performing regularly after he turned 13. Around this time, he performed for then President Dr. APJ Abdul Kalam. He also participated in a virtual exchange program between an audience in New Delhi and one in Carnegie Hall, where he and an American teenage musician discussed cultural and musical differences. In 2007, he took his first trip to Durban, South Africa, where he performed at the One World Music Festival with his father. In 2008, he played at the opening of the Commonwealth Youth Games held in Pune.

=== Orchestral and international performances ===
Ambi gave his debut orchestral performance at the age of 15 with the Orchestra Nationale du Lille conducted by Maestro Jean-Claude Cassedesus. In the same year, he performed at the Barbican, London, and the Royal Festival Hall for the first time. In 2008, he performed with the Leipzig Philharmonic Orchestra conducted by Dr. Michael Koehler. He has also performed with the Orchestra Nationale du Lille, Sinfonia Baltica, the Kwazulu Natal Symphony, and the Fairfax Symphony Orchestra.

In January 2013, Ambi was a soloist with the Seattle Symphony performing Shantipriya, a composition of Dr. L. Subramaniam. In 2014, he performed at the Madison Square Garden, as part of the events accompanying Prime Minister Narendra Modi's speech to the Indian American community. In 2015, Ambi performed at the Philharmonie de Paris, a cultural institution in France dedicated to music. He played at the Theatre de la Ville in 2017, and was the youngest Indian soloist to have performed there.

He performed at Chicago's Millennium Park for the first time in 2015 with his father, as part of the Chicago World Music Festival. It was the first time a Carnatic artist performed at the festival. In 2015, he performed in Iceland and in 2017, he performed at the 19th Annual Chicago World Music Festival. In 2018, he performed for External Affairs Minister Sushma Swaraj in Luxemburg.

Ambi is a regular performer at the Lakshminarayana Global Music Festival, participating as a featured soloist in many special events including Sounds of India and Violins for Peace. Ambi has performed twice at the Lincoln Center Out of Doors Festival, in 2008 and 2012.

Ambi continues to record and perform regularly with his father. He endorses D'Addario strings and Realist violins.

=== SubraMania and The Thayir Sadam Project ===
In 2013, Ambi started a fusion band, SubraMania, along with his sister Bindu Subramaniam. SubraMania has performed live in many cities across India and toured in seven European countries. In 2016, SubraMania was invited by the Spanish government to celebrate 60 years of Indo-Spanish relations. This inspired their single, Esperanza.

The band has collaborated with Hubert Laws, Oystein Baadsvik, Lesle Lewis, and Bollywood composer Aadesh Srivastav. SubraMania's music has been described as a "mammoth success" by the Asian Age, and their performance at the Jaipur Literature Festival in 2018 was described as "one of the major highlights" of the festival by Firstpost.

In 2018, Bindu and Ambi collaborated with Carnatic fusion artist Mahesh Raghvan to create The Thayir Sadam Project. The Thayir Sadam Project has released tracks in collaboration with Carnatic singing duo Ranjani-Gayathri, and created an Indian cover of A Million Dreams to promote the United Nations' Sustainable Development Goals. As of 2018, The Thayir Sadam Project has conducted workshops with over 5000 students, teaching them global music and promoting initiatives like the United Nations' Sustainable Development Goals (SDGs) via the 10,000 deeds campaign.

=== Music education ===
Ambi is the co-founder and CCO of the Subramaniam Academy of Performing Arts (SaPa), an institute of Indian and global music founded by Dr. L Subramaniam and Kavita Krishnamurti in 2007. He co-founded the SaPa in Schools program in 2014, as an initiative to integrate music into the mainstream academic curriculum. The program works with 30,000 children as of 2021.

Earlier in 2019, Ambi co-authored India's first series of textbooks dedicated to teaching the Indian violin. He is currently working on offering undergraduate courses in music education, technology, and performance.

In 2020, along with Bindu Subramaniam, Ambi took the SaPa curriculum online, with an online learning platform hosting self-paced courses by Dr. L Subramaniam, Kavita Krishnamurti Subramaniam, Anup Jhalota, Russ Miller and more.

== Masterclasses and Workshops ==
Ambi delivered two TEDx talks on fusion music and the violin – at different universities in Bangalore. He has conducted workshops at the Paris Conservatory, Metea Valley High School, Illinois, Whistling Woods International, Mumbai and many others. He has also conducted masterclasses in music at locations in Norway, Sri Lanka, Spain, The Netherlands, and Germany.

== Film and TV Appearances ==
Ambi did a cameo in Kamal Hassan's 'Hey Ram.' He appeared as Chinno, the younger brother of Vasundhara Das's character. In 2011, he was a featured guest on 'Oye! it's Friday' with host Farhan Akhtar and played for Bollywood actor Shah Rukh Khan, who called him a "genius".

He has made appearances on TV shows broadcast in Sri Lanka, Spain, Italy, UK, and the US. Along with Bindu, Ambi co-hosts The SaPa Show, a weekly television program aimed at teaching children Indian and global music.

== Personal life ==
Ambi was born in Los Angeles, California, to violinist L. Subramaniam and vocalist Vijayashree (Viji) Subramaniam. His sister Bindu Subramaniam is a musician and music educator, and his brother Dr. Narayana Subramaniam is a head and neck oncologist, author and musician. He moved to Bangalore, India with his family in 1996, after the death of his mother. His father married Bollywood playback singer Kavita Krishnamurti in 1999.

He is married to Shreya Suresh.

== Discography ==
Year	Album name
2009	Violin Maestros
2007	Visions of India
2012	Indian Violin
2012	Aadi Ganesh
2013	Global Traditions
2016	Just Playing
2016	Days in the Sun (single)
2016	Esperanza (single)
2017	You Were There
2018	Something Just Like This – Indian Mix (single)
2018	A Million Dreams – Indian Mix (single)
2018	Crazy Little Thing Called Chakravakam (single)
2018	Superheroes Without Capes (single)
2018	Stargazer (single)
2019	Margazhi Reloaded – Devipriya Tillana (single)
2019	Swarabindu Thillana
2019	Bhajans Revisited (with Mahesh Raghvan)
2020	How Would I Know
2020	Zigeunerweisen, Op 20
2020	Raghunayaka (ft. SaPa students)
2020	Kapi Tillana (with Shweta Mohan)
2020	Winter Walks (composed by Ambi Subramaniam)
2020	At The Door
2020	Sound of Carnatic (album)
2021	Syncopy
2021	Yennamma Thozhi (with Bindu Subramaniam)
2021	Living Room Sessions (Bollywood Covers - series)
