= No Coast Jazz =

Studio album by John Handy III
- Released: 1960
- Recorded: 1960; New York City
- Genre: Jazz
- Label: Roulette; SR 52058
- Producer: Teddy Reig

John Handy III chronology
In the Vernacular (1959)	No Coast Jazz (1960)	Jazz (1962)

No Coast Jazz is an album by saxophonist John Handy III featuring tracks recorded in 1960 and originally released on the Roulette label.

== Reception ==
Professional ratings
Review scores
Source	Rating
AllMusic	4/5 stars

AllMusic awarded the album 3 stars and its review by Scott Yanow states, "The inside/outside music (advanced hard bop that sometimes hints at the avant-garde) still sounds quite fresh".

== Track listing ==
All compositions by John Handy III

1. "To Randy" - 6:16
2. "Tales of Paradise" - 4:53
3. "Boo's Ups and Downs" - 8:15
4. "Hi Number" - 6:59
5. "Pretty Side Avenue" - 5:29
6. "No Coast" - 6:29

== Personnel ==
- John Handy III - alto saxophone
- Don Friedman - piano
- Bill Lee - bass
- Lex Humphries - drums
