= The Temptations Do The Temptations =

The Temptations Do the Temptations

Studio album by The Temptations
- Released: August 16, 1976
- Recorded: spring 1976
- Genre: Soul/Funk/Disco
- Length: 35:05
- Labels: Gordy; GS 975
- Producer: Michael Lovesmith /The Temptations

The Temptations chronology
Wings of Love (1976)	The Temptations Do the Temptations (1976)	Hear to Tempt You (1977)

Professional ratings
Review scores
Source	Rating
AllMusic	3/5 stars
The Rolling Stone Album Guide	2/5 stars

The Temptations Do the Temptations is an album by the Temptations, released in 1976 via Gordy Records. The Temptations' Motown contract was terminated after the release of the album.

This was the last album that Dennis Edwards was on before his first departure.

The group enjoyed the greatest creative control of their career, producing and writing most of the tracks. The album received virtually no promotional support from Motown, which didn't like that the Temptations had such creative freedom over the album.

After two unsuccessful years at Atlantic Records, the group would return to Motown for twenty-four more years.

== Track listing ==
All tracks produced by Tall "T" Productions & Suzee Ikeeda, except Side Two tracks one and four produced by Michael L. Smith.

Side one
No.	Title	Writer(s)	Lead singer(s)	Length
1.	"Why Can't You and Me Get Together"	David English, Otis Williams, Richard Street, Glenn Leonard, and Benjamin Wright	Leonard, Street, Melvin Franklin	4:54
2.	"Who Are You (and What Are You Doing With The Rest Of Your Life"	English, Leonard, Williams, and Wright	Dennis Edwards	4:34
3.	"I'm On Fire (Body Song)"	English, Leonard, Williams, Wright, and Street	Leonard	4:24
4.	"Put Your Trust In Me, Baby"	Leonard, English, and Williams	Leonard, Edwards, Franklin	3:58

Side two
No.	Title	Writer(s)	Lead singer(s)	Length
5.	"There Is No Stopping (Til We Set The Whole World Rockin')"	Michael L. Smith	Edwards, Street, Franklin	5:02
6.	"Let Me Count The Ways (I Love You)"	English, Edwards, Williams, Street, and Leonard	Franklin, Leonard, Street, Williams	3:57
7.	"Is There Anybody Else"	English, Leonard, Williams, and Wright	Leonard	4:55
8.	"I'll Take You In"	Smith	Edwards	5:01

== Personnel ==
=== The Temptations ===
- Dennis Edwards - tenor/baritone vocals
- Glenn Leonard - first tenor/falsetto vocals
- Richard Street - tenor/baritone vocals
- Melvin Franklin - bass vocals
- Otis Williams - second tenor/baritone vocals

=== Musicians ===
- John "Special Effects" Barnes: Keyboards
- Melvin "Wah Wah" Ragin: Guitars
- Hanry Davis: Bass
- James Gadson: Drums
- Eddie "Bongo" Brown: Percussion

== Production ==
- Produced by The Temptations, Michael Lovesmith and Suzee Ikeda
- Recorded by Art Stewart and Cal Harris; assisted by "Sweet Baby" Jane Clark
- Mixed by Cal Harris
- Norman Seeff: Photography
