= Karuna Supreme =

Studio album by John Handy and Ali Akbar Khan
- Released: 1976
- Recorded: November 1, 1975
- Studio: Tonstudio Bauer, Ludwigsburg, Germany
- Genre: Jazz, World music
- Length: 41:09
- Label: MPS; MPS 15455
- Producer: Joachim-Ernst Berendt

John Handy chronology
Projections (1968)	Karuna Supreme (1976)	Hard Work (1976)

Karuna Supreme is an album by American jazz saxophonist John Handy and sarod player Ali Akbar Khan which was recorded in 1975 and originally released on the MPS label.

== Reception ==
Professional ratings
Review scores
Source	Rating
Allmusic	4.5/5 stars

Allmusic awarded the album 4½ stars stating "Karuna Supreme", recorded in 1975, is one of the earliest true fusions of Indian music and jazz, and remains one of the most successful... The level of communication among the players throughout this session would be difficult to surpass. This is one of those rare East-meets-West recordings that absolutely succeeds at every level. Highly recommended".

== Track listing ==
1. "Ganesha's Jubilee Dance" (Ali Akbar Khan, John Handy) - 9:19
2. "Karuna Supreme" ( Ali Akbar Khan) - 11:06
3. "The Soul and the Atma" (Ali Akbar Khan, Ustad Allauddin Khan) - 20:44

== Personnel ==
- John Handy - alto saxophone
- Ali Akbar Khan - sarod
- Zakir Hussain - tabla
- Yogish S. Sahota - tanpura
