= Time Is Running Out (album) =

Studio album by Brass Fever
- Released: 1976
- Recorded: 1976; North Hollywood, California
- Genre: Jazz
- Length: 40:38
- Label: Impulse! AS 9319
- Producer: Esmond Edwards

Brass Fever chronology
| Brass Fever (1975) | Time Is Running Out (1976) |

Professional ratings
Review scores
| Source | Rating |
|---|---|
| AllMusic | 2.5/5 stars |

Time is Running Out is the second and final album by American jazz/R&B group Brass Fever recorded in 1976 and released on the Impulse! label.

== Reception ==
The AllMusic review states "Time Is Running Out is uneven but does have its moments".

== Track listing ==
1. "Time Is Running Out" (McKinley Jackson, Sharon Jones) – 5:52
2. "Takin' It to the Streets" (Michael McDonald) – 4:20
3. "Boogie on Reggae Woman" (Stevie Wonder) – 4:47
4. "Mr. Tambourine Man" (Bob Dylan) – 5:25
5. "Dancing Machine" (Hal Davis, Don Fletcher, Dean Parks) – 6:00
6. "Pressure Drop" (Toots Hibbert) – 4:02
7. "Summertime" (George Gershwin, Ira Gershwin, DuBose Heyward) – 6:35
8. "Funky Carnival" (Esmond Edwards) – 3:37

== Personnel ==
- Al Aarons, Oscar Brashear, Bobby Bryant, Snooky Young – trumpet
- George Bohanon, Garnett Brown, Jimmy Cleveland, Maurice Spears – trombone
- Pee Wee Ellis, Sahib Shihab, Ernie Watts – alto saxophone, flute
- Ray Parker Jr., Lee Ritenour – electric guitar
- John Barnes Jr., Jerry Peters – keyboards
- Henry Davis, Scott Edwards – electric bass
- James Gadson – drums
- Eddie "Bongo" Brown – congas
- Bill Summers – percussion
- Reggie Dozier, Esmond Edwards, Julia Tillman, Luther Waters, Maxine Waters, Oren Waters, Shirley Jones, Brenda Jones, Valorie Jones – vocals
- McKinley Jackson – conductor, arranger
- The Sid Sharp Strings (track 1)
