= New View (John Handy album) =

Live album by John Handy
- Released: 1967
- Recorded: June 28, 1967
- Venue: Village Gate, New York City
- Genre: Jazz
- Length: 42:21
- Label: Columbia; CS 9497
- Producer: John H. Hammond

John Handy chronology
| The 2nd John Handy Album (1966) | New View (1967) | Projections (1968) |

Professional ratings
Review scores
| Source | Rating |
|---|---|
| The Penguin Guide to Jazz Recordings | 4/4 stars |

New View is a live album by saxophonist John Handy and his quintet, recorded and released in 1967. It was Handy's second live and third release for Columbia. The original LP features three pieces: two Handy originals and a version of "Naima", recorded as a homage to saxophone legend John Coltrane, who would die three weeks after this recording (July 17). The subtitle "In Memory of" was expressly added for the release in late 1967.

The song "Tears of Ole Miss (Anatomy of a Riot)" was inspired by the Ole Miss riot of 1962 and initially performed by Handy's Freedom Band, a group formed in 1963 to raise funds for Civil Rights causes.

== Track listing ==
1. "Naima (In Memory of John Coltrane)" (John Coltrane) - 9:31
2. "A Little Quiet" (Handy) - 9:13 (13:29 on CD)
3. "Tears of Ole Miss (Anatomy of a Riot)" (Handy) - 23:37 (31:00 on CD)

"A Little Quiet" and "Tears of Ole Miss" were edited for LP issue (Columbia CS 9497), but appear unedited on CD issue (Koch Jazz KOC-CD-7811-2H1).

== Personnel ==
- John Handy – alto saxophone
- Bobby Hutcherson - vibraphone
- Pat Martino - guitar
- Albert Stinson - bass
- Doug Sides - drums
