= Kavita Krishnamurthy =

Indian singer (born 1958)

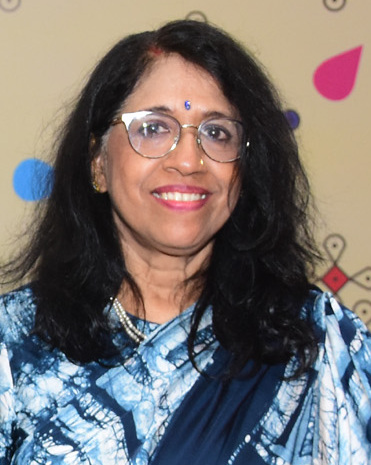
- Krishnamurthy in 2024

Background information
- Also known as: Kavita Subramaniam
- Born: Sharada Krishnamurthy; 25 January 1958 (age 68); New Delhi, India
- Genres: Filmi; Fusion; Classical; Islamic; Ghazals; Pop
- Occupation: Playback singer
- Years active: 1971–present
- Awards: Filmfare Best Female Playback Singer Awards (2003); Filmfare Best Female Playback Singer Awards (1997); Filmfare Best Female Playback Singer Awards (1996); Filmfare Best Female Playback Singer Awards (1995)
- Honours: Padma Shri (2005)

Kavita Krishnamurthy (born 25 January 1958) is an Indian playback and classical singer. She has recorded numerous songs in various Indian languages including Hindi, Bengali, Kannada, Rajasthani, Bhojpuri, Telugu, Odia, Marathi, English, Urdu, Tamil, Malayalam, Gujarati, Nepali, Assamese, Konkani, Punjabi and other languages. She is the recipient of four Filmfare Best Female Playback Singer Awards (winning consecutively during 1995–1997), and the Padmashri which she received in 2005. She was awarded a Doctorate (Honoris Causa) for her contributions to Indian music by Bangalore-based Jain University in 2015. In 1999, she married noted violinist L. Subramaniam and resides in Bengaluru.

== Early life ==
She was born as Sharada into a Tamil family in New Delhi to T. S. Krishnamurthy, an employee of the Education Ministry. She began her musical training at the insistence of her aunt Protima Bhattacharya who enrolled her to train under guru Surama Basu, who taught her Rabindra Sangeet. She began her formal training in Hindustani classical music under the guidance of Balram Puri, a classical singer. At the age of eight, Kavita won a gold medal at a music competition. She won several medals participating in the Inter-Ministry Classical Competition in New Delhi in the mid-1960s.

== Career ==
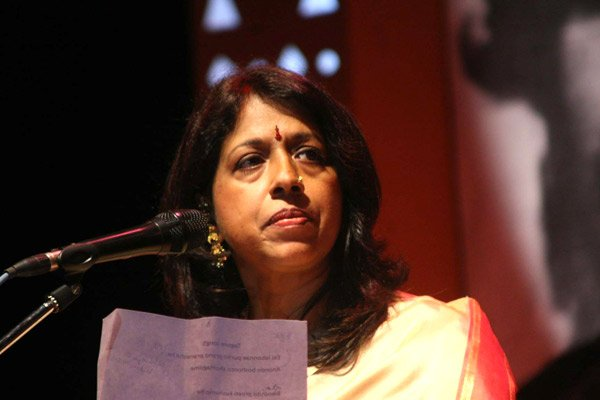
Kavita Krishnamurthy at the Bengali poetry event Panchkanya at Nehru Centre in Mumbai, 2008.

During her college days at St. Xavier College, Mumbai, she got an opportunity to record a song in the Bengali film Shriman Prithviraj in 1973 with Lata Mangeshkar as co-singer under the auspices of the music composer and singer Hemant Kumar. Although the young Sharada aspired to work in Indian Foreign Services, she moved to Bombay when she was 14 to try her luck as a playback singer in the Hindi film industry.

She is an alumnus of St. Xavier's College, Bombay from where she did her BA Honors Economics. She was very active in St. Xavier's music group. During the annual college festival (Malhar), she met Ranu Mukherjee, the daughter of Hemant Kumar. Ranu took the initiative of reintroducing Kavita to her father, who began using her as a singer during his live performances. At one such performance, playback singer Manna Dey spotted her and employed her to sing advertisement jingles. Through her aunt's contacts, she met Jaya Chakravarthy, the mother of actress Hema Malini, who later introduced Kavita to the music director Laxmikant (one of the composer duo Laxmikant–Pyarelal) in late 1976. A recent interview covers a pretty good summary of her musical journey.

=== Playback singing ===
Track singing and remake recording

She recorded her first song under Vilayat Khan's composition in Kadambari (1976). The song was entitled Aayega Aanewala (a remake of Mahal's (1949), the superhit song sung by Lata Mangeshkar) and was picturised on Shabana Azmi. Laxmikant gave her an opportunity to work as a dubbing artist. Initially, she recorded songs and cut demos of songs intended for singers Lata Mangeshkar and Asha Bhosle.

First original song:

However she got her first own song, recorded in 1977 in Kannada, "Ondanondu kaaladaga" in the film Ondanondu Kaladalli (Once upon a time) directed by Girish Karnad. The song was penned by the Jnanpit awardee Chandrashekhara Kambara and the music by Bhaskar Chandavarkar. Being the only song in the entire movie, "Ondanondu kaladaga" with its folk touch, became a hit and earned fame for Kavita Krishnamurti. Then she went on to sing many Kannada-language songs.

In 1980, she sang "Kaahe Ko Byaahi" for the film Maang Bharo Sajana, which featured her singing in her own voice, although the song was dropped from the final cut of the film. In 1985, her career took off with her first major hit, "Tumse Milkar Na Jaane Kyon" from the Hindi film Pyaar Jhukta Nahin (1985). Following the success of the song, it opened up opportunities for her beyond the Laxmikant–Pyarelal camp. However, "Hawa Hawai" and "Karte Hai Hum Pyaar Mr. India Se", two popular songs from the equally popular movie Mr. India (1987) - Karte Hain Hum Pyaar Mr. India se, proved to be a turning point in her career. The songs were composed by music composers Laxmikant–Pyarelal, the latter being a duet with Kishore Kumar and lip-synced on screen by an actress Sridevi. Her collaboration with Laxmikant–Pyarelal produced several hits. Hawa Hawai, which launched her into stardom was dubbed to be recorded by Asha Bhosle, however later producer decided to keep her version despite her mistake in the song.

The 1990s thrust Kavita into being known as one of the leading female playback singers. Her performance as a singer in the film 1942:A Love Story, composed by R. D. Burman, won her much popular acclaim. With a string of hits from 1942:A Love Story, Yaraana, Agni Sakshi,Mohra and Khamoshi, Kavita Krishnamurthy established herself as a leading female playback singer, alongside Alka Yagnik. She went on to work with several music directors of the 1990s Hindi films, such as Bappi Lahiri, Anand–Milind, A. R. Rahman, Rajesh Roshan, Raamlaxman, Ismail Darbar, Himesh Reshammiya, Aadesh Shrivastava, Nadeem-Shravan, Jatin–Lalit, Viju Shah and Anu Malik. Her work with A. R. Rahman and Ismail Darbar remain some of the most critically acclaimed renditions of the last two decades. During her stint as a playback singer, she sang duets with the leading male singers of her time. Early in her career, she sang duets with Kishore Kumar, Mohammed Rafi and Shailendra Singh. Her most prolific works were with the leading singers of the 1990s are Amit Kumar, Mohammad Aziz, Udit Narayan, Kumar Sanu, S. P. Balasubrahmanyam and Abhijeet. She has also sung with younger singers in the 2000s such as Sonu Nigam, Shaan and Babul Supriyo. Her female duets mostly have been with Alka Yagnik, then with Anuradha Paudwal and Sadhana Sargam with a few duets also with Lata Mangeshkar and Asha Bhosle. During the 90s and early 2000s, Kavita Krishnamurthy alongside Alka Yagnik sang mostly for leading ladies.

As she actively started exploring fusion music, Kavita traveled around the world, including the US, UK, UAE, Europe, Africa, Australia, East Asia, the Middle East, and South America. She has performed in concert halls including Royal Albert Hall in London, The Kennedy Center in Washington, D.C., Madison Square Garden, The Lincoln Center in New York City, the Zhongshan Music Hall in Beijing, The Esplanade in Singapore, The Putra Jaya World Trade Centre in Kuala Lumpur, and Gewandhaus Leipzigm.

Although primarily a playback singer, Kavita has sung with orchestras as a soloist; she has collaborated with Western artists from jazz, pop and classical fields. She has lent her voice for many albums. As a playback singer, Kavita has performed throughout India. In 2014, she also sang "Koi Chahat Koi Hasrat" for the album Women's Day Special: Spreading Melodies Everywhere. It was composed by Nayab Raja and penned by Dipti Mishra.

==== In Kannada ====
Kavita's playback singing career started with Kannada-language films. Her first film song was in the Kannada film Ondanondu Kaladalli (1978) with the same title. She sang many hit songs in Kannada since then. Songs such as "Bareyada mounada Kavithe" (Sparsha), "Hoove Hoove" (H2O), "Endo Kanda kanasu" (Lankesh Patrike), "O Malle o dumbi" ('Naga Devate'), "Artha madkolo" (Shishya), "Kaveri Kaveri" (Raja Huli), and many more hit songs made her a household name in Karnataka.

=== Pop and devotional singing ===
Due to her participation in fusion and pop music, Kavita has lent her voice to several pop and devotional albums. The most prominent ones being:

- Bhalobasi
- Shiv Baba ko Yaad Kar
- Dujone Dekha Holo
- Together Tagore
- Premer Neshay
- Mohe Raam Dhun Laagi
- Bhajan Stuti
- Aadi Ganesh
- Venkatesha Suprabhatam
- Shiva Shlokas
- Koi Akela Kahan
- Meera Ka Ram
- Mahalakshmi Stotram
- Pop Time
- Sai Ka Vardaan
- Shagufthagi
- Dil Ki Awaaz
- Hasratein
- Athens
- Asmita
- Mahiya
- "Hum Dono"

== Television appearances ==
Kavita Subramaniam made many appearances in various music reality shows as a guest judge because of her popularity as a playback singer. She recently was a judge for Bharat Ki Shaan: Singing Star (Season 1), which aired on DD National at prime time. She also appeared in Vijay TV Airtel Super Singer and Star Jalsha Super Singer. She has also sung for serials like Mahabharat (1988), Ramayan (1986), Shri Krishna (1993), and Ramayan (2008), Kavita Krishnamurthy At Know In 2017 Special Juries and Judge UAE Singers of Student, The Give as Prices 5,000 Dinar In Winner. She also appeared in Rising Star Season 2, which was broadcast on Colors TV on 4 March 2018 as a guest.

== Personal life ==
Kavita Krishnamurti married L. Subramaniam in Bengaluru, Karnataka on 11 November 1999.

Subramaniam has four children from his previous marriage. His eldest daughter Gingger Shankar is a singer, composer, and multi-instrumentalist, while his second eldest, Bindu Subramaniam is a law graduate and singer-songwriter. Narayana is a doctor, while the youngest, Ambi Subramaniam, is an accomplished violinist.

Kavita and her husband opened a musical institute, the Subramaniam Academy of Performing Arts, in Bengaluru in 2007. In March 2013, she launched her own app.

== Awards and nominations ==
- 2015 - Honorary Doctorate from Jain University, Bangalore
- 2000 - Accolades for her include the “Best Singer of the Millennium” award at the Stardust Millennium 2000 Awards

Civilian Awards

- 2005 – Padma Shri – India's fourth-highest civilian honors
- 2024 - Playback singer Kavita Krishnamurthy received a Lifetime Achievement Award from the UK Asian Film Festival (UKAFF) in May 2025.
- 2024 - Amrit Ratan Award.
- 2025 - S.D Burman International Award.
- 2025 - Smriti Award.
- 2025 - Lokmat Sur Jyotsna National Music Award - Legend Award for her contribution to Indian music.
- 2025 - Renowned playback singer Kavita Krishnamurthy was honored with the prestigious Mother Teresa International Award in Dubai, UAE. She was recognized for her extraordinary contributions to Indian music and her continued social outreach.
- 1997 - Aashirwad Film Award Best Female Playback Singer" (Virasat 1997 - Dhol Bajne Laga)

Filmfare Awards

- 2003 – Best Female Playback Singer (shared with Shreya Ghoshal) – "Dola Re Dola" (Devdas)
- 1997 – Best Female Playback Singer – "Aaj Main Upar" (Khamoshi)
- 1996 – Best Female Playback Singer – "Mera Piya Ghar Aaya" (Yaraana)
- 1995 – Best Female Playback Singer – "Pyaar Hua Chupke Se" (1942)

State Awards

- 2000 - Maharashtra State Film Award for Best Female Playback Singer - for the songs in the movie Sawai Hawaldar.

Star Screen Awards

- 1997 – Best Female Playback Singer – "Aaj Main Upar" (Khamoshi)
- 2000 – Best Female Playback Singer – "Hum Dil De Chuke Sanam" (Hum Dil De Chuke Sanam)

Zee Cine Awards

- 2003 – Best Female Playback Singer (shared with Shreya Ghoshal) – "Dola Re" (Devdas)
- 2000 – Best Female Playback Singer – "Nimbooda" (Hum Dil De Chuke Sanam)

IIFA Awards

- 2001 - Best Female Playback Singer - "Ae Dil Laya Hai Bahar" (Kya Kehna)
- 2003 – Best Female Playback Singer (shared with Shreya Ghoshal) – "Dola Re Dola" (Devdas)

International Television Academy Awards (ITA Awards)

- 2008 - Best Female Playback Singer (Durga Puja).

Global Indian Music Awards (GIMA Awards)

- 2010 - Best Female Playback Singer (Best Fusion Album).

MMA Awards

- 2021 - Jury Prize (Album Of The Decade / Rockstar 2011).

Other Awards

- Mohammed Rafi Award (2021).
- Prafulla Kar Samman (2018) Odia Film Industry.
- ‘Phonomenal That's Me’ award for her contribution to the Kannada film industry (2014)
- Shri Ravindra Jain Sangeet Samman (2012)
- Swaralaya Yesudas Award (2008) by Swaralaya, for exceptional contribution to Indian music.
- Lata Mangeshkar Award from the Government of Madhya Pradesh (2005)
- Kishore Kumar Journalists' / Critics' Award in Calcutta (2002)
- Lion's / Club Bollywood Award, held in New York (2000) At The Same year (2002)

== See also ==
- L. Subramaniam
- Girish Karnad
- Padmavati Rao
- Prabhat Samgiita
- List of Indian playback singers
