= Russ Miller (musician) =

American session drummer

- Genres: Pop, Session
- Instruments: Drums, percussion

Russ Miller is an American session drummer. Miller grew up in Ohio.

As a multi-platinum recording artist, Miller has played on multiple Grammy award-winning recordings with combined sales of over 26 million copies. He has worked with over 50 international artists, including Ray Charles, The 5th Dimension, Cher, Natalie Cole, Tina Turner, Bobby Caldwell, Andrea Bocelli, Nelly Furtado, The Psychedelic Furs, Al Jarreau, Hilary Duff, Daniel Bedingfield, and Meredith Brooks. Modern Drummer Magazine Readers Poll voted Miller as one of the top five studio drummers in the world three years in a row. Miller has performed on more than 300 albums, and dozens of international movies such as Chicken Little, Fracture, Rugrats Go Wild!, Boondock Saints, Resident Evil Apocalypse, Silent Hill, and Garfield. Along with his album credits, he has two solo albums, Cymbalism and Arrival, both on R.M.I Records.

Miller has authored two books: "The Drum Set Crash Course" and "Transitions," along with his accompanying videos, "The Drum Set Crash Course" and "The Drum Set Crash Course Tuning Edition" from Warner Brothers Publications. A five-time Modern Drummer readers poll winner, Miller's solo projects were voted the No. 1 educational books and videos in the world.

Miller also invented the Yamaha Wedge and Cascara Wedge. He is also a contributor to creating the Yamaha Subkick. These items were discontinued from Yamaha since Miller signed up for Mapex Drums, where he developed the SONIClear bearing edge and his signature snare drum "The VersVersus."
