= L. Subramaniam =

Indian musician (born 1947)

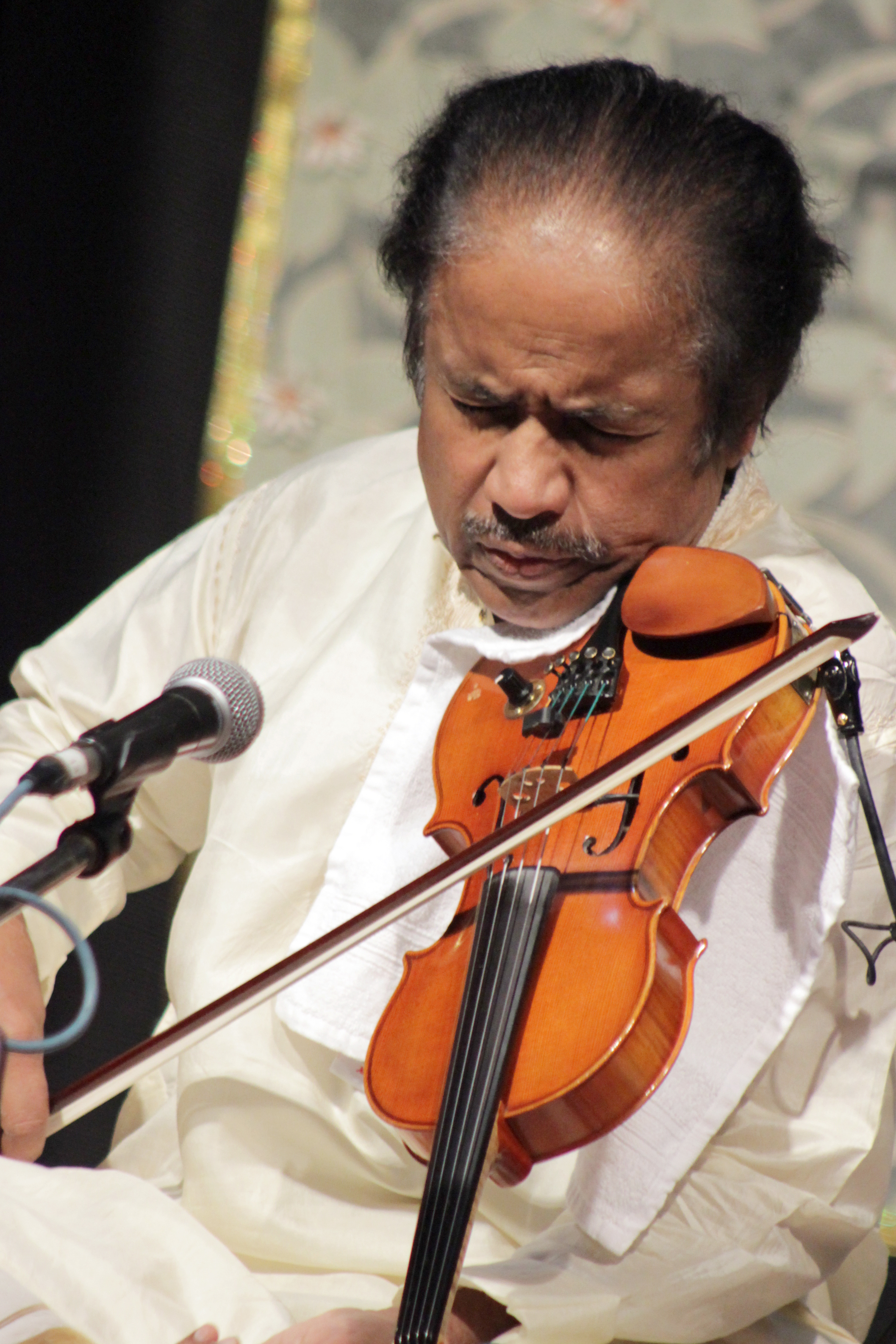
- L. Subramaniam performing at a concert in Bhopal in October 2015

Background information
- Born: Lakshminarayana Subramaniam; 23 July 1947 (age 79); Madras, Madras Presidency, British India (now Chennai, Tamil Nadu, India)
- Genres: Classical, Carnatic, jazz fusion, Indo jazz, world fusion, Western classical music
- Occupations: Violinist, composer, conductor, multi-instrumentalist, arranger, record producer, pedagogue, physician
- Instruments: Violin, percussion, synthesiser, vocals
- Years active: 1958–present
- Relatives: L. Vaidyanathan (brother); L. Shankar (brother)

Lakshminarayana Subramaniam (born 23 July 1947) is an Indian violinist, composer, and conductor trained in the traditions of Carnatic music and Western classical music.

== Early and personal life ==
On 23 July 1947, Subramaniam was born in Madras, Madras Presidency, British India, to V. Lakshminarayana Iyer and Seethalakshmi, both accomplished musicians.

He spent his early years in Jaffna, where he began his music studies at the age of five. Under the guidance of his father, Professor V. Lakshminarayana, who is known by fellow musicians and his family as "Mani", he started training in violin. He gave his first public performance at the age of six.

His uncles are Ramnad Raghavan and Ramnad Krishnan. His brothers are the violinist-composers L. Shankar (also known as Shenkar), and the late L. Vaidyanathan. He has released recordings with both.

Subramaniam developed an early interest in both music and science. He pursued medical studies and earned his M.B.B.S. degree from Madras Medical College. After registering as a general practitioner, he chose to focus on music as a full-time career. He later obtained a master's degree in Western classical music from the California Institute of the Arts.

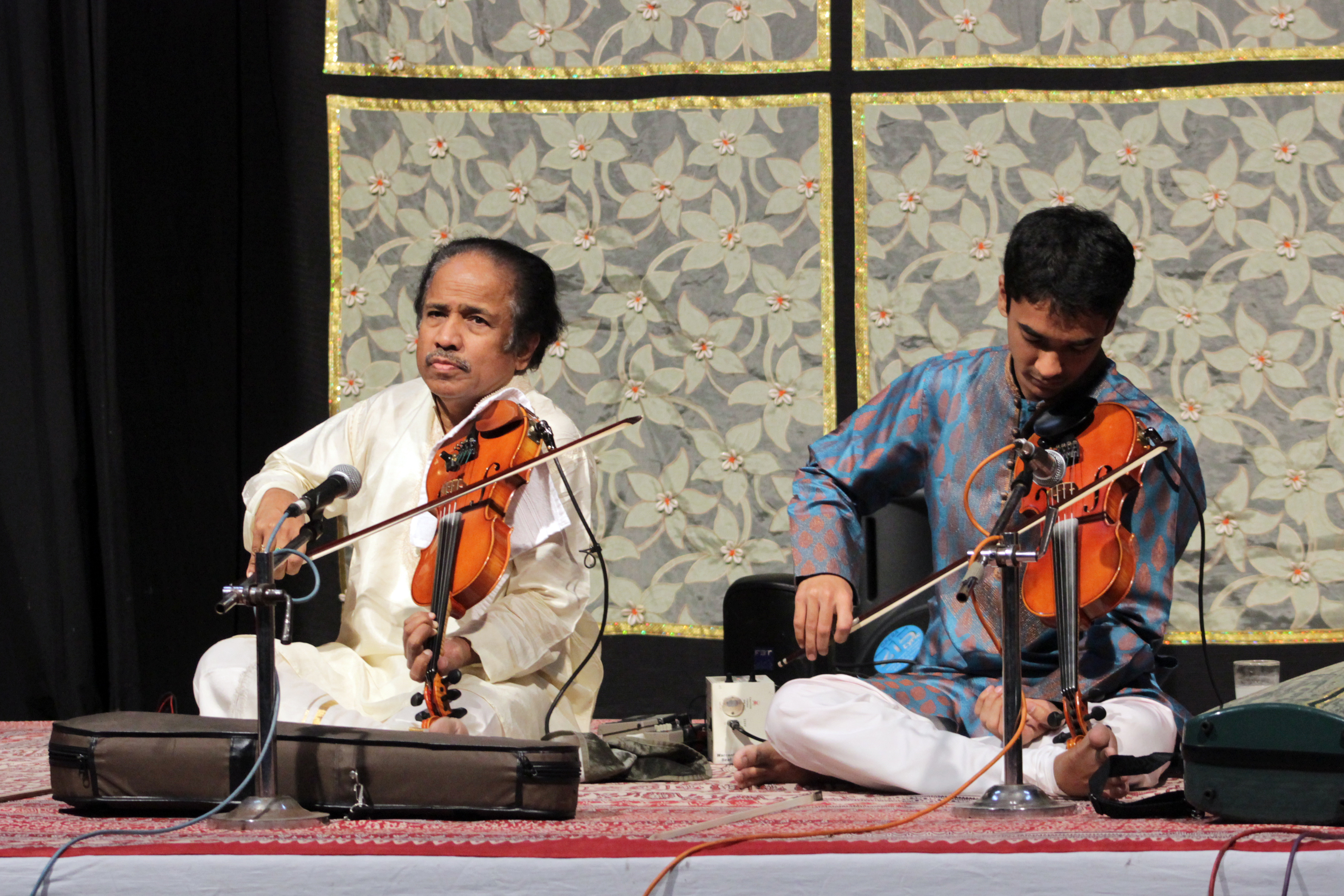
Performance with his son Ambi Subramaniam at Bharat Bhavan Bhopal

He was first married to Viji Subramaniam (née Vijayashree Shankar), who died on 9 February 1995. He has four children with Viji — Gingger Shankar, Bindu Subramaniam, Dr. Narayana Subramaniam and Ambi Subramaniam. Since November 1999, he is married to the Indian playback singer Kavita Krishnamurthy.

Subramaniam performs with his daughter, Bindu Subramaniam, and plays violin duets with his son, Ambi Subramaniam. He has also recorded and performed with Kavita Krishnamurthy. These musical collaborations have led to them being collectively referred to as the "Subramaniam Gharana." He has also performed with his eldest son, Dr. Narayana Subramaniam.

== Performing career ==
Since 1973, Subramaniam has amassed over 200 recordings, releasing several solo albums, recording collaborations with musicians Yehudi Menuhin, Stéphane Grappelli, Ruggiero Ricci and Jean-Pierre Rampal. He has also made albums and performed with artists like Ruggiero Ricci, Herbie Hancock, Joe Sample, Jean-Luc Ponty, Stanley Clarke John Handy, George Harrison and several others.

He has accompanied several vocalists in Carnatic music on stage including Chembai Vaidyanatha Bhagavatar, K. V. Narayanaswamy, Semmangudi Srinivasa Iyer, M. Balamuralikrishna, M. D. Ramanathan, and Alathur Srinivasa Iyer. He has also performed many concerts with Palghat Mani Iyer on the Mridangam, in addition to collaborating with musicians of North Indian Hindustani music and artists of other music systems. He was among the early South Indian classical musicians to perform a jugalbandhi with a Hindustani musician when he played with Ustad Ali Akbar Khan in the late 1970s.

Subramaniam has written works for orchestras, ballets and Hollywood film scores, and written books on music, such as Euphony, in addition to his compositions.

In 1983, he composed a Double Concerto for violin and flute which combined western scales with micro intervals. In 1985, he composed the popular Fantasy on Vedic Chants which was premiered with the New York Philharmonic, conducted by Maestro Zubin Mehta (in September '85) and later performed with the Mariinsky Theatre Orchestra, conducted by Djemal Dalgat. Subramaniam's first symphonic piece, Spring–Rhapsody, composed in 1986, was an homage to Bach and Baroque music. He then composed Turbulence which was performed with The Swiss Romande Orchestra, "The Concert of Two Violins" performed with the Oslo Philharmonic, and Global Symphony that the Berlin State Opera performed (broadcast live to 28 nations). He has also performed a concert tour of China, with the Beijing Symphony Orchestra in Beijing. To date, he has composed ten symphonies and most of his orchestral works have been published by Schott Music.

His compositions have been used in stage presentations of dance companies such as the San Jose Ballet company and the Alvin Ailey American Dance Theater. Subramaniam composed the piece "Shanti Priya" for the Mariinsky Ballet in 1988.

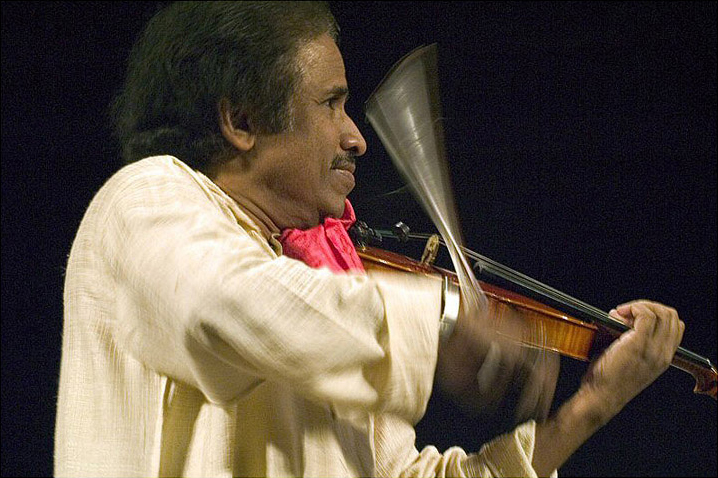
Subramaniam performing at a concert in 2003

The album Global Fusion (1999) contributed significantly to Subramaniam’s international reputation and gave him critical recognition for his works. He founded and directs the Lakshminarayana Global Music Festival, which he established in 1992 in memory of his father and guru, V. Lakshminarayana. In 2004, the festival toured internationally, with concerts in New York, Perth, Singapore, Penang, and Kuala Lumpur. Performing with Subramaniam at the festival in January 2005 were violin maestro Arve Tellefsen, the Oslo Camerata, jazz legends Stanley Clarke, George Duke, Al Jarreau, Earl Klugh and Ravi Coltrane.

In September 2007, Subramaniam premiered his "Freedom Symphony" with the Fairfax Symphony Orchestra at the George Mason University Center for the Arts. Subramaniam is on the advisory board of composer A. R. Rahman's KM Music Conservatory in Kodambakkam, Chennai.

In 2011, he was invited to perform at the United Nations. On 24 October 2012, he performed as a Special Guest Artist with Stevie Wonder at the latter's Message of Peace concert at the UN. Yehudi Menuhin said of Subramaniam:

"I find nothing more inspiring than the music making of my very great colleague Subramaniam. Each time I listen to him, I am carried away in wonderment."

When asked about his musical accomplishments, Subramaniam said:

"Music is a vast ocean and no one can claim to know it all. The more you know, the more you realise how little you know. It is an eternal quest."

== Orchestral performances ==
Subramaniam is regarded as a pioneer in global symphonic composition. He was the first Indian to compose major symphonies that were premiered by orchestras, and often bridges Indian classical music with Western orchestral traditions in his works.

Among these works is Fantasy on Vedic Chants, premiered in 1985 by the New York Philharmonic under the baton of Zubin Mehta. His symphony Shantipriya was premiered by the Kirov Orchestra in New Delhi in 1988. In 1996, his Global Symphony was presented at Madison Square Garden in New York by the New York String Players with singers from the Metropolitan Opera, the first time his symphonic works were presented at the venue.

Subramaniam has composed approximately twenty full orchestral works. His repertoire includes symphonies, concertos, double concertos, orchestral works with choirs, compositions featuring non-Western soloists, chamber groups with orchestra, and even pioneering works where solo instruments can be replaced. He also reintroduced improvisational cadenzas into symphonic form, allowing for technical improvisation within the orchestral framework.

His notable works include:

- The Double Concerto for Violin and Flute, blending Western scales with micro-intervals
- Spring–Rhapsody, an homage to Bach and Baroque traditions
- Astral Symphony, commissioned by Norway’s NRK P2 Award, written for full orchestra with replaceable soloists from different musical traditions
- Freedom Symphony, commemorating 60 years of Indian independence, featuring Indian voices and texts in five languages

Subramaniam has collaborated with more than fifty orchestras worldwide, including the London Symphony Orchestra, Berlin Opera Orchestra, Oslo Philharmonic, Beijing Symphony Orchestra, Singapore Symphony Orchestra, and the Royal Oman Symphony Orchestra, among others. His works have been performed in venues such as Lincoln Center, Madison Square Garden, Beijing National Centre for the Performing Arts, Tchaikovsky Concert Hall, and the Gewandhaus.

He has worked with conductors including Maestro Zubin Mehta, Vladimir Fedoseyev, Jean-Claude Casadesus, Tan Lihua and Li Xincao, among others.

On many occasions, entire concert evenings have been dedicated exclusively to his compositions. He has had over 150 live performances of his orchestral works and numerous audio-video releases.

== Film career ==
He composed the film scores for the films Salaam Bombay (1988) and Mississippi Masala (1991) directed by Mira Nair, in addition to being the featured violin soloist in Bernardo Bertolucci's Little Buddha (1993) and Cotton Mary (1999) of Merchant-Ivory productions.

== Lakshminarayana Global Music Festival ==
The Lakshminarayana World Music Festival concert was first initiated by his brother, L. Shankar in 1991 in memory of their father V. Lakshminarayana, who died in 1990. The BBC film ‘Bombay and All That Jazz’ (1992) was based on the tribute concert that took place in Bombay on New Year’s Day, January 1, 1992, which featured Don Cherry, L. Shankar, TH Vinayakram, Trilok Gurtu and many others.

Subsequently, on 11 January 1992, Vijayashree and Subramaniam launched the Lakshminarayana Global Music Festival (LGMF) in Madras (Chennai).

Artists have included the Subramaniam family, Al Jarreau, George Duke, Solo Cissokho, Miya Masaoka, Mark O'Connor, Loyko, Jean-Luc Ponty, Ustad Bismillah Khan, Larry Coryell, Arve Tellefsen, Pandit Jasraj, Dr. M. Balamuralikrishna and Corky Siegel.

The festival has centred around special concepts such as Violins for Peace, Visions of India and Sounds of India.

Honour Lokmat Sur Jyotsna National Music legends Award 2024.

== Subramaniam Academy of Performing Arts ==
In 2007, the Subramaniam Foundation, a charity run by Subramaniam and his wife set up a music school called the Subramaniam Academy of Performing Arts (SAPA), in Bangalore, India.

== Awards and recognition ==
- Padma Vibhushan award by government of India (2025)
- PhD in music (Thesis on Raga Harmony for Orchestral compositions), Jain University (2017)
- D.Litt. Honoris Causa of ITM University, Gwalior (M.P.) (2016)
- Lifetime Achievement Award, Limca Book of Records (2012)
- GiMA (Best Carnatic Instrumental Album – Innovations), Global Indian Music Academy (2012)
- Uttam Vag Geykar Jialal Vasant Award, Ajivasan (2011)
- Big Star IMA Award (Best Classical Instrumental Album – Violin Maestros), Indian Music Academy (2011)
- GiMA (Best Carnatic Instrumental Album – Violin Maestros), Global Indian Music Academy (2010)
- GiMA (Best Fusion Album – Live at Neues Gewandhaus, Leipzig), Global Indian Music Academy (2010)
- Tantri Nada Mani, Kanchi Kamakoti Peetham, Kanchipuram (2009)
- Asthana Vidwan, ISKCON, Bangalore (2009)
- Viswa Kala Bharathi Bharat Kalachar, Chennai (2004)
- Sangeetha Kalaratna, Bangalore Gayana Samaja (2004)
- Sangeetha Kalaa Shiromani, Percussive Arts Centre, Bangalore (2004)
- Honorary Doctorate, Bangalore University (2003)
- Padma Bhushan, Government of India(2001)
- Manaviyam (Millennium) Award, Government of Kerala (2001)
- Lotus Festival Award, City of Los Angeles (1998)
- Special Medal of Honour, HH King Birendra of Nepal (1997)
- Best Composer Award/Commission, NRK P2, Norway (1996)
- Sangeeta Ratna Mysore, T. Chowdaiah Memorial National Award (1996)
- Awarder at the World Music Festival at Madison Square Gardens, Bharatiya Vidya Bhavan, New York (1995)
- Nada Chakravarthy, Ganapathi Sachchidananda Swamiji, Trinidad (1993)
- Onida Pinnacle Award (Best title track composer: Surabhi) (1993)
- Creative Music Award, Sangeet Natak Akademi (1990)
- Padma Shri, Government of India (1988)
- Award for outstanding contribution to Indo-American goodwill, understanding and friendship, Indo-American Society (1988)
- Sangeeta Sagaram, Cultural Centre of Performing Arts (1984)
- Grammy Nomination (for the album Indian Classical Music) (1981)
- Orpheus of the East Kala Samarpana, Alliance Francaise, Chennai (24 November 1972)
- Violin Chakravarthy, Governor of Madras (6/11/1972)
- Best Western Instrumentalist, IIT Madras (1972)
- President's Award for Best Violinist, All India Radio (1963)

== Compositions ==
=== Violin concertos ===
- Fantasy on Vedic Chants (New York Philharmonic, New York)
- Concerto for violin (Hong Kong Philharmonic, Hong Kong)
- Shanti Priya (Kirov Orchestra, New Delhi, India)
- Turbulence concerto (Swiss Romande Orchestra, Geneva)
- Isabella concerto (Castile and León Symphony Orchestra, Valladolid, Spain)
- Paris concerto (Orchestra Chambre de Paris, France)
- Nada Priya (Collegium Instrumentale Halle, Halle)
- Violin Concerto Beyond (Conterchamps Ensemble, India)

=== Double concertos ===
- For 2 Violins or Violin & Flute (New American Orchestra, Los Angeles, USA)
- Violin & Tuba (Trondheim Symphony, Trondheim)
- Violin & Double Bass/Cello (CU Symphony Orchestra, Boulder USA)

=== Concerto Grosso Violin soloist ===
- Violins for peace, Premiere (Menuhin Centenary Festival in Belgium)

=== LS symphonies ===
- Global Symphony (NEW YORK STRING PLAYERS, SINGERS FROM THE METROPOLITAN OPERA, NY Madison Square Garden)
- Astral Symphony (NRK Radio Symphony with World String Ensemble, Oslo Norway)
- Freedom Symphony (Fairfax Symphony, Fairfax)
- Turbulence Symphony (Sibiu State Philharmonic, Sibiu, Romania)
- Bharat Symphony (Elmhurst Community Philharmonic Orchestra, Millennium park Chicago)
- Symphony of celebration (Liepajas Symphony Orchestra, Riga, Latvia)
- Mahatma Symphony (Houston Symphony, Houston)
- Spring Rhapsody (New England Conservatory Orchestra, Boston, USA)
- Reflection (Singapore Symphony Orchestra, Singapore)
- Transformation symphony (Singapore Symphony, Singapore - Indian Orchestra, Choir, & Singapore - Chinese Ensemble)
- Sai symphony (Sai Symphony, Puttaparthi)
- Datta symphony (Symphony Orchestra of Northern Kazakhstan, India)
- Navagraha Symphony (Astana Filharmonia & Aktobe choir, India)

=== Encore compositions ===
- Flight of the humble bee
- Conversations
- Tribute to Bach
- Vandemataram
- Don't Leave me
- French resolution
- Autumn Leaves
- Broken vow
- Dil ne kaha
- Raha Niharu
- Kya jaanu sajan
- Tu mujhe kubool

=== Meera Bhajans with Kavita Krishnamurti Subramaniam ===
- Jo tum todo
- Eri main to
- Mere to Girdhar Gopal
- Barse Badariya

=== Trinity Publishing ===
- Journey
- Violin & piano Raga based compositions

=== Ballet compositions ===
- Shantipriya ballet
- Beauty and the Beast, UK
- Taming of the Shrew, UK

=== Shantipriya Ballet ===
- Kirov Orchestra, New Delhi | Nov, 1988
- San Jose Ballet, California | Oct, 1993 (5 performances)
- Cleveland Ballet, Ohio | Oct 1993 (6 performances)
- Astana Filharmonia & Gakku dance ballet, India | Jan, 2026 (5 performances)

== Selected discography ==
- Enchanting Melodies on the Violin (1977) (with Palghat Mani Iyer)
- Garland (1978) (Storyville) (featuring Svend Asmussen)
- Live in Concert (World Music Festival, 6 May 1978)
- Fantasy without Limits (Trend Records) (1979)
- Subramaniam (1980)
- Rainbow (1980) (with Ali Akbar Khan and John Handy)
- Indian Classical Music (1980) (featuring Zakir Hussain)
- Le violon de l'Inde du Sud (1980) (Ocora)
- Ragam, Tanam, Pallavi / The Virtuoso Violin of South India: Subramaniam (1981) (Plateselskapet MAI/Lyrichord)
- Blossom (1981) (Crusaders/MCA) (with Herbie Hancock and Larry Coryell)
- South Indian Strings (1981) (Lyrichord) (with Palghat Mani Iyer)
- Spanish Wave (1983) (Milestone)
- Indian Express (1984) (Milestone)
- The Irresistible Dr L. Subramanium (1985) (Oriental)
- Distant Visions (1985) (Audiorec)
- Magic Fingers (1986)
- Mani & Co. (1986) (featuring Maynard Ferguson) (Milestone)
- East Meets West (1987)
- Electric Modes: Winter Sessions (1988) (Water Lily Acoustics)
- An Anthology of South Indian Classical Music (1990) (Ocora)
- Indian Classical Masters: Raga Hemavati (1990) (Nimbus Records)
- Kalyani (1990) (Water Lily Acoustics)
- Expressions of Impressions (1991) (Sonic Atmospheres)
- Indian Classical Masters: Three Ragas for Solo Violin (1991) (Nimbus Records)
- Sarasvati (1991) (Water Lily Acoustics)
- Musical Heritage of South India (1992)
- Beyond (1993) (New Earth Records)
- Samarpanam (1993)
- Masters of Raga (1995) (Wergo)
- Pacific Rendezvous (1995) (Manu Music Productions)
- Electric Modes Volumes 1 & 2 (1995) (Water Lily Acoustics)
- Matchless (1999) (with Alla Rakha)
- Global Fusion (1999) (Warner/Erato Detour Records/Viji)
- Free your Mind (2002) (Iris Musique)Larry Coryell
- Asmita (2004) (Viji) (featuring Kavita Krishnamurthy and Bindu Subramaniam)
- Maestro's Choice (2004) (Music Today)
- My Golden Years (2004) (Music Today/Viji)
- Best of L. Subramaniam (2004) (Niranjani Music)
- The Violin Legends (2004) (with Yehudi Menuhin and Stéphane Grappelli)
- Violin Maestros (2007) (featuring Ambi Subramaniam)
- Innovations (2012) (featuring Palghat Mani Iyer) (EMI)

=== Collaborations with other artists ===
- L. Subramaniam with Stu Goldberg and Larry Coryell: Solos-Duos-Trios (1978) (MPS Records)
- L. Subramaniam with John Handy and Ali Akbar Khan: Rainbow (1980) (MPS)
- L. Subramaniam with Stéphane Grappelli: Conversations (1984) (Milestone)
- L. Subramaniam and Yehudi Menuhin: L. Subramaniam and Yehudi Menuhin in New York (1987)
- L. Subramaniam and Ali Akbar Khan: Duet (1993) (Delos)
- L. Subramaniam with Yehudi Menuhin and Stéphane Grappelli: All the World's Violins (1993) (Virgin Classics/EMI)
- L. Subramaniam and Larry Coryell: From the Ashes (1999) (Water Lily Acoustics)
- L. Subramaniam with various artists: Lakshminarayana Global Music Festival: Vol. I & II (Sony Music)
- L. Subramaniam and Ustad Rais Khan: Sangeet Sangam (2005) (Navras Records)
- L. Subramaniam with Karsten Vogel: Meetings (2007) (Calibrated)

=== Live albums ===
- L. Subramaniam en concert: Southern Indian Violin (1983) (Harmonia Mundi/Ocora)
- India's Master Musicians (1983) (Delos/Ravi Shankar Music Circle)
- Live in Moscow / Time Must Be Changed (1988) (Melodiya/Boheme Music/BMG/Viji)
- In Praise of Ganesh (featuring Anindo Chatterjee) (1991) (Audiorec)
- L. Subramaniam en Concert (1995) (Ocora)
- Kingdom of Peace: Live in Nepal (1997)
- L. Subramaniam: Live in France
- L. Subramaniam and Bismillah Khan: Live in Geneva (1991)

== Filmography ==
=== Composer ===
- Surabhi (1988) (composer, music arranger, musician: violinist)
- Salaam Bombay! (1988) (composer, music arranger, musician: violinist)
- Mississippi Masala (1991) (composer, musician: violin, violin synthesizers, percussions)
- Jayate (1997) (composer)
- Ee Snehatheerathu (2004) (composer)
- Banaz: A Love Story (2012) (composer, musician: violin)
- Gour Hari Dastaan (2013) (composer)
- Hey Ram (2000) (composer, left the project before completion)

=== Soloist ===
- Little Buddha (1993) (violinist)
- Kama Sutra: A Tale of Love (1996) (violinist)
- Cotton Mary (1999) (violinist)

=== Additional soundtracks ===
- Peace One Day (2004) (composer, performer: "Gypsy Trail")
- Baraka (1992) (performer: "Wandering Saint")
- Raga Mohanam (2012) (performer: "Samarpanam")

=== On Subramaniam ===
- L. Subramaniam: Violin From the Heart (1999). Directed by Jean Henri Meunier.
