= Esmond Edwards =

American photographer and record producer (1927–2007)

Esmond Edwards (October 29, 1927 – January 20, 2007) was an American photographer, record producer, and recording engineer. He worked for the jazz label Prestige Records during the 1950s and early 1960s. He was originally hired by founder Bob Weinstock as a photographer for the record label. He was a trail-blazing African-American, as very few recording industry executives were from minorities. He took over the supervision of recording sessions as the Prestige label's success grew.

== Biography ==
His parents, Lucille and Moses Edwards were natives of Kingston, Jamaica. Edwards was born in Nassau, Bahamas while his father was on a work assignment there. Living for a short time in New York City, they returned to Kingston where they resided until eventually leaving their two sons in the care of a family member. After the death of his brother, Noel, Edwards joined his parents in New York City where they lived in Harlem and Washington Heights for many years.

Edwards was educated in New York City schools, including Frederick Douglass (J.H.S.139), Stuyvesant High School and City College of New York. He studied radiography at the Jersey City Medical Center, and while working there pursued an avid interest in photography and music. Using his years of piano lessons as a background, he began creating jazz compositions in his teen years, and ultimately combined his creativity in music and photography into a very prolific and successful career.

Edwards' photographic work has been displayed in New York's Lincoln Center Jazz Archives, in galleries abroad, as well as The New York Times Magazine and Photography.

Edwards worked in various venues of the jazz and blues arena, beginning at Prestige Records in 1957, and moved up to the position of producer, in beginning in 1963 producing for the Argo and Cadet subsidiary labels of Chess Records, before going on to head the Verve Records label for MGM in 1967. He became the vice-president of A&R for Chess Records in 1970. During his career, he was also associated with MGM, Columbia, Polydor, and Impulse Records. He was one of the first African-American executives in the recording industry, but was also a noted record producer, composer and arranger.

Edwards was awarded several gold and platinum records with many outstanding artists in the jazz and blues world, including Miles Davis, Mose Allison, George Benson, John Coltrane, Chuck Berry, Don Ellis, Etta James, Ramsey Lewis, B.B. King, Keith Jarrett, and others. He photographed many of these artists for the album jackets of numerous recordings, such as for Ramblin' Jack Elliott,.

Edwards received a nomination for a Grammy Award, for the cast album of the Tony Award-winning Broadway musical, Your Arms Too Short to Box with God.

Edwards died from cancer in Santa Barbara, California on January 20, 2007, at the age of 79.

== Discography ==
=== As sideman ===
- Brass Fever, Time Is Running Out (ABC Impulse!, 1976)
- Sonny Criss, The Joy of Sax (ABC Impulse!, 1976)
- Bo Diddley, Big Bad Bo (Chess, 1974)
- John Handy, Carnival (ABC Impulse!, 1977)
- Gene Harris, Nature's Way (JAM, 1984)
- Jimmy Ponder, Illusions (ABC Impulse!, 1976)
- Reuben Wilson, Got to Get Your Own (Cadet, 1975)
