= John Handy =

American jazz musician (born 1933)

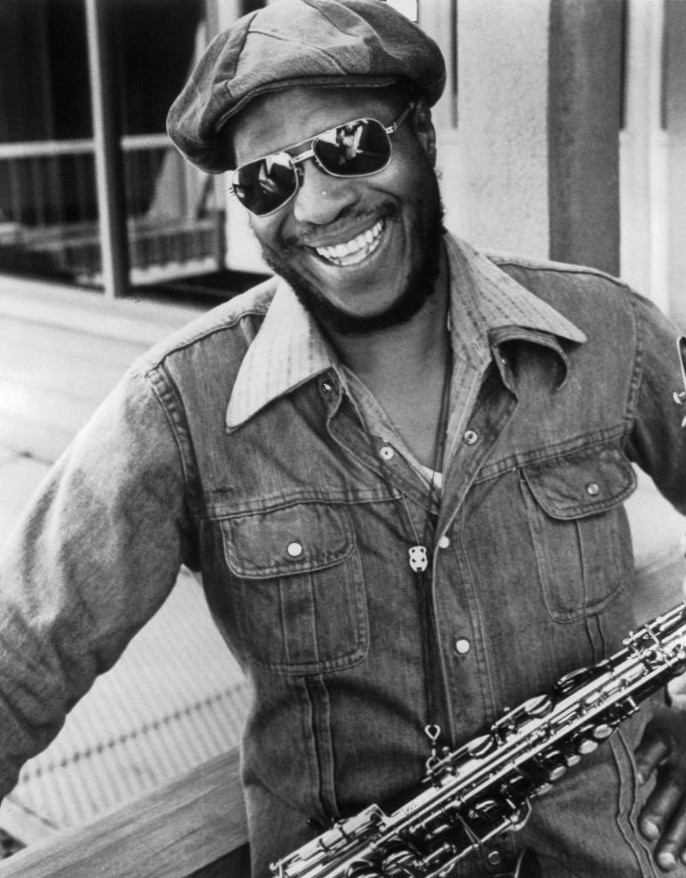
- Handy in 1977

Background information
- Born: John Richard Handy III; February 3, 1933 (age 93); Dallas, Texas, U.S.
- Genres: Jazz, jazz fusion
- Occupation: Musician
- Instrument: Saxophone
- Years active: 1953–present
- Labels: Roulette, Columbia, Impulse!, Warner Bros., Milestone, American Music, Harbor, Koch, Boulevard
- Website: www.johnhandy.com

John Richard Handy III (born February 3, 1933) is an American jazz musician most commonly associated with the alto saxophone. He also sings and plays the tenor and baritone saxophone, saxello, clarinet, and oboe.

== Biography ==
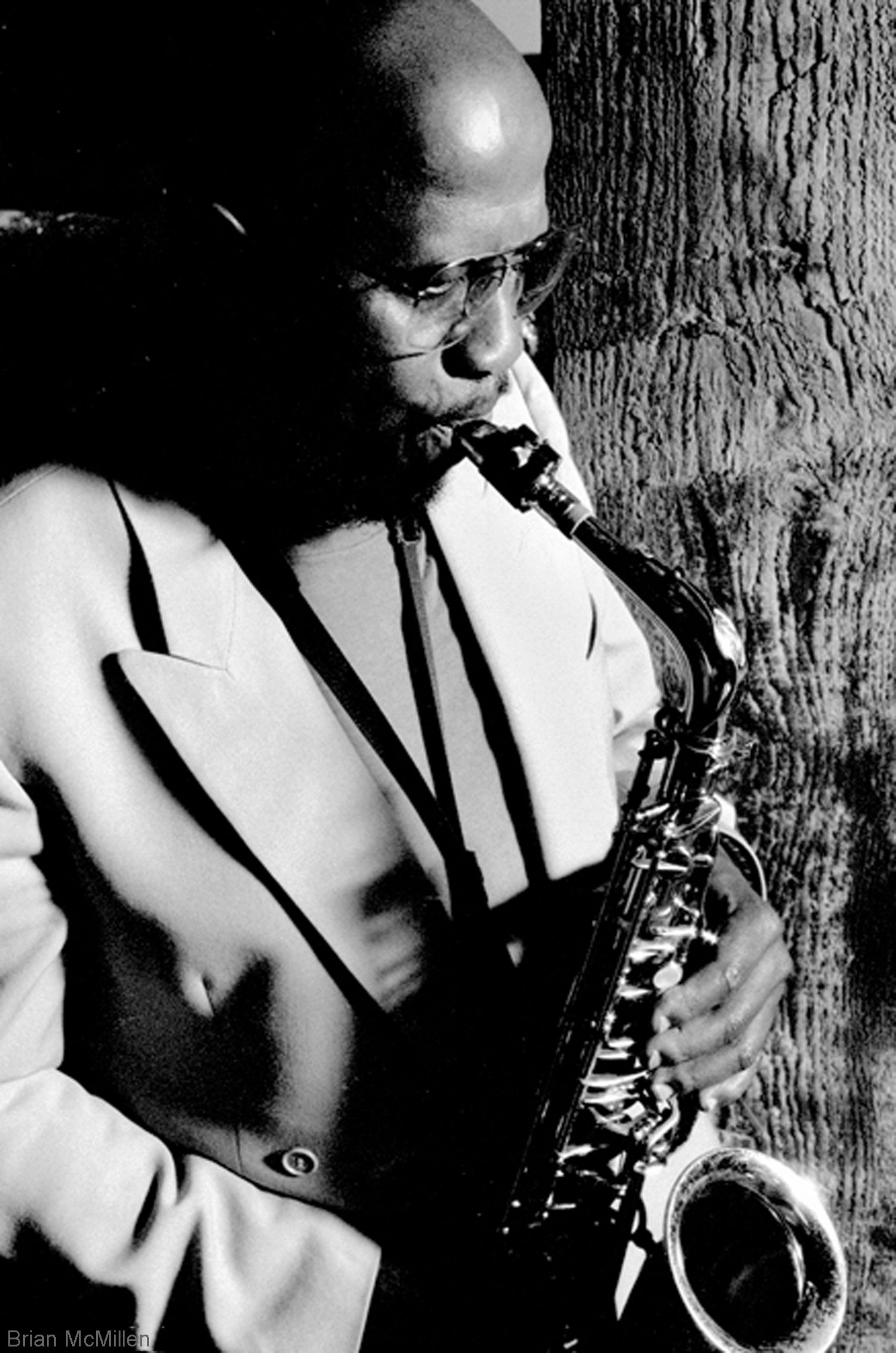
John Handy at Bach Dancing & Dynamite Society, Half Moon Bay CA 5/25/86

Handy was born in Dallas, Texas, United States. He first came to prominence while working for Charles Mingus in the 1950s. In the 1960s, Handy led several groups, among them a quintet with Michael White, violin, Jerry Hahn, guitar, Don Thompson, bass, and Terry Clarke, drums. This group's performance at the 1965 Monterey Jazz Festival was recorded and released as an album; Handy received Grammy nominations for "Spanish Lady" (jazz performance) and "If Only We Knew" (jazz composition).

After completing high school at McClymonds High School in Oakland, he studied music at San Francisco State College, interrupted by service during the Korean War, graduating in 1958. Following graduation, he moved to New York City. Handy has taught music history and performance at San Francisco State University, Stanford University, the University of California, Berkeley, and the San Francisco Conservatory of Music.

In the 1980s he worked in the project Bebop & Beyond, which recorded tribute albums to Dizzy Gillespie and Thelonious Monk. His son, John Richard Handy IV, is a drummer who has played with Handy on occasion.

In 2009, he received the Beacon Award from SF JAZZ.

== Discography ==
=== As leader ===
- In the Vernacular (Roulette, 1959)
- No Coast Jazz (Roulette, 1960)
- Jazz (Roulette, 1962)
- Recorded Live at the Monterey Jazz Festival (Columbia, 1966)
- The 2nd John Handy Album (Columbia, 1966)
- New View (Columbia, 1967)
- Quote, Unquote (Roulette, 1967)
- Projections (Columbia, 1968)
- Karuna Supreme (MPS, 1975) with Ali Akbar Khan
- Hard Work (Impulse!, 1976)
- Carnival (Impulse! 1977)
- Where Go the Boats (Warner Bros., 1978)
- Handy Dandy Man (Warner Bros., 1978)
- Rainbow (MPS, 1980) with Ali Akbar Khan and Dr. L. Subramaniam
- Excursion in Blue (Quartet, 1988)
- Centerpiece (Milestone, 1989) with CLASS
- Live at the Monterey Jazz Festival (Koch, 1996)
- Live at Yoshi's Nightspot (Boulevard, 1996)
- John Handy's Musical Dreamland (Boulevard, 1996)

=== As sideman ===
With Brass Fever

- Brass Fever (Impulse!, 1975)
- Time Is Running Out (Impulse!, 1976)

With Charles Mingus

- Jazz Portraits: Mingus in Wonderland (United Artists, 1959)
- Mingus Ah Um (Columbia, 1959)
- Mingus Dynasty (Columbia, 1959)
- Blues & Roots (Atlantic, 1960)
- Right Now: Live at the Jazz Workshop (Fantasy, 1964)

With Mingus Dynasty

- Live at the Theatre Boulogne-Billancourt/Paris, Vol. 1 (Soul Note, 1988)
- Live at the Theatre Boulogne-Billancourt/Paris, Vol. 2 (Soul Note, 1988)
