= Louis Price =

American singer & actor (born 1953)

- Born: Louis Price; March 29, 1953 (age 73)
- Origin: Chicago, Illinois, United States
- Genres: R&B; soul
- Occupations: Vocalist, Producer, Actor
- Instrument: keyboard
- Years active: 1977–present
- Labels: Atlantic Records, Motown Records,

Louis Bernhardt Price (born March 29, 1953) is an American R&B and soul singer and actor notable for being the lead singer of the first post-Dennis Edwards led version of The Temptations from 1977 to 1979.

Price lived in Chicago as a child and attended John Marshall High School. He moved to Los Angeles and sang in various groups before being asked to replace Edwards after he left the previous year. Price joined the group just as they were leaving their longtime label Motown for Atlantic Records. He was the principal lead vocalist on "Hear to Tempt You" and one of the featured lead vocalists on "Bare Back".

Price then joined The Drifters and remained with them through the first half of the 1980s, while also doing occasional studio singing with groups like Heatwave on their album, Current. In the late 1980s, Price signed with Motown and recorded his self-titled debut album, Louis Price, which was released in 1991.

Price has appeared in the film White Men Can't Jump as fictional playground legend Eddie "The King" Faroo, as well as providing vocals for the diegetic song "Gloria" which appears in the film. He appears as the principal on the TV series My Wife & Kids. In 1998, he was heard providing the singing voices for Edwards in the Temptations miniseries. He also provided singing vocals for Cornwallis for the "Circle of Poo" song in the South Park episode "A Very Crappy Christmas", incorrectly credited as "Lewis Price".

In August 2019, Price released the single "When Doves Cry" as a tribute to the 35th anniversary of Prince's "Purple Rain".

Price currently performs various concerts and club dates nationally around the United States.
