= For You (Eddie Kendricks album) =

Studio album by Eddie Kendricks
- Released: December 1974
- Recorded: 1974
- Studio: Motown Recording Studios, Hollywood, California
- Genre: Soul
- Label: Tamla Records
- Producer: Frank Wilson, Leonard Caston

Eddie Kendricks chronology
Boogie Down! (1974)	For You (1974)	The Hit Man (1975)

Singles from For You
- 1. "One Tear" Released: November 5, 1974; 2. "Shoeshine Boy" Released: January 13, 1975

Professional ratings
Review scores
Source	Rating
AllMusic	4/5 stars

For You is the fifth album by former Temptations vocalist Eddie Kendricks. Released in late 1974 on the Tamla imprint of Motown Records. It was arranged by Jimmie Haskell, Leonard Caston Jr., Jerry Long, Sanford Shire and Greg Poree. Jim Britt was the cover photographer.

== Track listing ==
Side one

1. "Please Don't Go Away" (Leonard Caston) 4:57
2. "One Tear" (Leonard Caston) 4:00
3. "Shoeshine Boy" (Harry Booker, Linda Allen) 3:14
4. "Deep and Quiet Love" (Frank Wilson, Kathy Wakefield) 5:34

Side two

1. "Let Yourself Go" (Bradley "Mbaji" Ridgell, Harold Clayton, Leonard Caston, Sigidi) 5:45
2. "If" (David Gates) 3:09
3. "If You Think (You Can)" (Barbara Dickerson, Leonard Caston) 3:59
4. "Time in a Bottle" (Jim Croce) 2:59

== Charts ==
Year	Album	Chart positions	
Year	Album	US	US R&B
1974	For You	108	8

=== Singles ===
Year	Single	Chart positions		
Year	Single	US	US R&B	US Dance
1974	"One Tear"	71	8 (1975)	14
1975	"Shoeshine Boy"	18	1	15
