= Madam Butterfly (album) =

Studio album by Tavares
- Released: January 1979
- Genres: R&B, soul
- Length: 37:39
- Label: Capitol
- Producer: Bobby Martin

Tavares chronology
Future Bound (1978)	Madam Butterfly (1979)	Supercharged (1980)

Professional ratings
Review scores
Source	Rating
AllMusic	4/5 stars
The Encyclopedia of Popular Music	3/5 stars
The New Rolling Stone Record Guide	3/5 stars

Madam Butterfly is the seventh album by the American soul/R&B group Tavares, released in 1979 on Capitol Records.

== Commercial performance ==
By this stage in the group's career, they had become known as a disco act due to successful singles such as "Heaven Must Be Missing an Angel", "Whodunit" and "More Than a Woman." However, Madam Butterfly is noted for its lack of anything approaching disco material, and, as such, is considered to be more akin in style to the group's 1973-'75 albums than to their '76-'78 Freddie Perren-produced output.

"Never Had a Love Like This Before", one of several slow jams on the album, became a top 5 R&B hit and has subsequently become a quiet storm radio classic, while tracks such as "I'm Back for More" are more funk-based than listeners had come to expect from Tavares. The title track Madam Butterfly received considerable airplay on R&B radio stations, and became a hit, but was not released as a single by Capitol. The album performed respectably on the R&B chart, peaking at #13, but failed to achieve substantial sales in the crossover market. Its reputation has grown over the years and it is now considered among the group's best.

== Track listing ==
1. "Straight from Your Heart" (Len Ron Hanks, Zane Grey) - 4:23
2. "Games, Games" (Sam Dees) - 4:30
3. "Madam Butterfly" (Johnny Simon, Kenny Stover) - 4:29
4. "Let Me Heal the Bruises" (Sam Dees) - 4:24
5. "Never Had a Love Like This Before" (Len Ron Hanks, Zane Grey) - 4:32
6. "One Telephone Call Away" (Benorce Blackmon) - 4:22
7. "My Love Calls" (Sam Dees) - 5:05
8. "Positive Forces" (Joe Reaves, Lonnie Reaves) - 2:56
9. "I'm Back for More" (Kenny Stover) - 2:58

== Singles ==
- "Never Had a Love Like This Before" (US R&B No. 5)
- "Straight from Your Heart" (US R&B No. 77)

== Personnel ==
Tavares

with:

- Benorce Blackmon, Steve Erquiaga – guitar
- David Shields – bass
- Ron "Have Mercy" Kersey – keyboards
- Len Ron Hanks – keyboards on "Straight from Your Heart" and "Never Had a Love Like This Before"
- Gaylord Birch – drums
- Melvin Webb – percussion
- Don Moors – vibraphone
- John Roberts, Oscar Brashear – trumpet, flugelhorn
- Grover Mitchell, Linda Small, Maurice Spears, Tom McIntosh – trombone
- Bobby Martin, Len Ron Hanks, Ron "Have Mercy" Kersey – arrangements
- Paul Shure – concertmaster
