= The Hit Man =

Studio album by Eddie Kendricks
- Released: July 1975
- Recorded: 1975
- Genre: Soul
- Label: Tamla Records
- Producer: Frank Wilson, Leonard Caston, Brian Holland

Eddie Kendricks chronology
For You (1974)	The Hit Man (1975)	He's a Friend (1976)

Singles from The Hit Man
- 1. "Get The Cream Off The Top" Released: June 18, 1975; 2. "Happy" Released: September 1975

The Hit Man is the sixth album by former Temptations vocalist Eddie Kendricks. The album was released in 1975 on the Tamla imprint of Motown Records.

== Reception ==
Professional ratings
Review scores
Source	Rating
Allmusic	2.5/5 stars

== Track listing ==
1. "If Anyone Can" - (Kathy Wakefield, Leonard Caston) 3:22
2. "Happy" - (Kathy Wakefield, Leonard Caston) 5:13
3. "Get the Cream Off the Top" - (Brian Holland, Eddie Holland) 3:04
4. "Body Talk" - (Frank Wilson, Kathy Wakefield) 6:41
5. "Fortune Teller" - (Barrett Strong) 3:32
6. "Skippin' Work Today" - (J. Christopher Fox) 4:35
7. "You Loved Me Then" - (Kathy Wakefield, Leonard Caston) 2:30
8. "I've Got to Be" - (Kathy Wakefield, Leonard Caston) 7:48

== Personnel ==
- Eddie Kendricks - lead and backing vocals
- James Jamerson - bass guitar
- Leonard Caston Jr., Harold Johnson - keyboards
- James Gadson, Ed Greene, Harvey Mason, Earl Palmer - drums
- Jay Graydon, Johnny McGhee, Ray Parker Jr., Melvin "Wah-Wah" Ragin - guitar
- Gary Coleman, Gene Estes, Bobbye Hall - percussion
- Eddie "Bongo" Brown - congas
- Bobby Taylor, Carolyn Majors, Frank Wilson, Harold Johnson, Joe Croyle, Joe White, John Fox, Karin Patterson, Leonard Caston Jr., Mara Baygulow, Mike Campbell - vocal ensemble
- Jim Britt - cover photography

== Charts ==
Year	Album	Chart positions	
Year	Album	US	US R&B
1975	The Hit Man	63	9

=== Singles ===
Year	Single	Chart positions	
Year	Single	US	US R&B
1975	"Get The Cream Off The Top"	50	7
1975	"Happy"	66	8
