= Boogie Down! =

Studio album by Eddie Kendricks
- Released: February 1974
- Recorded: 1973–1974
- Genre: Soul
- Label: Tamla Records
- Producer: Frank Wilson, Leonard Caston Jr.

Eddie Kendricks chronology
Eddie Kendricks (1973)	Boogie Down! (1974)	For You (1974)

Singles from Boogie Down!
- 1. "Boogie Down" Released: December 13, 1973; 2. "Son of Sagittarius" Released: April 16, 1974; 3. "Tell Her Love Has Felt The Need" Released: July 2, 1974

Boogie Down! is the fourth album by former Temptations vocalist Eddie Kendricks, released in early 1974 on the Tamla imprint of Motown Records.

== Reception ==
The Allmusic review by Jason Elias awarded the album 4 stars stating "Boogie Down cut for cut is Kendricks' strongest album.".

Professional ratings
Review scores
Source	Rating
Allmusic	4/5 stars

== Track listing ==
1. "The Thin Man" (Anita Poree, Frank Wilson, Leonard Caston) 3:40
2. "Tell Her Love Has Felt the Need" (Kathy Wakefield, Leonard Caston) 4:30
3. "Son of Sagittarius" (Anita Poree, Frank Wilson, Leonard Caston) 3:41
4. "Boogie Down" (Anita Poree, Frank Wilson, Leonard Caston) 7:07
5. "Hooked on Your Love" (Don Daniels, Frank Wilson, Terri McFaddin) 3:30
6. "Honey Brown" (Don Daniels, Frank Wilson, Terri McFaddin) 5:18
7. "You Are the Melody of My Life" (Don Daniels, Terri McFaddin) 4:00
8. "Trust Your Heart" (Frank Wilson, Leonard Caston, Terri McFaddin) 4:13
9. "Girl of My Dreams" (Kathy Wakefield, Leonard Caston) 3:28
10. "Loving You the Second Time Around" (Frank Wilson, Leonard Caston, Pam Sawyer) 3:12

== Personnel ==
- Eddie Kendricks - lead and backing vocals
- Melvin "Wah-Wah" Ragin, Greg Poree, Dean Parks, Dennis Coffey - guitar
- Jack Ashford - tambourine, percussion
- King Errisson - congas
- James Jamerson, Darrell Clayborne - bass
- Harold Johnson - organ, electric piano
- Kenny Rice, Ed Greene, James Gadson, Gene Pello, Aaron Smith, Roger Bethelmy - drums
- Jerry Peters - keyboards
- Mike Campbell - harmonica
- Leonard Caston - clavinet, piano, organ, other keyboards

== Production ==
- Frank Wilson, Leonard Caston - producer
- Frank Wilson, Leonard Caston, Dave Van De Pitte, James Carmichael - arrangements
- James Carmichael, Dave Van De Pitte, Leonard Caston - orchestration
- Russ Terrana, Art Stewart, Cal Harris, Andrew Berliner - recording engineers
- Frank Wilson, Andrew Berliner - mixing engineers
- Lynn Allen - coordination, inspiration
- Jim Britt - design, photography

== Charts ==
Chart (1974)	Peak position
Billboard Top LPs	30
Billboard Top Soul LPs	1

=== Singles ===
Year	Single	Chart positions	
Year	Single	US	US R&B
1974	"Boogie Down"	2	1
1974	"Son Of Sagittarius"	28	5
1974	"Tell Her Love Has Felt The Need"	50	8
