= Slick (album) =

Studio album by Eddie Kendricks
- Released: August 1977
- Recorded: 1975–1976
- Studios: The Sound Suite & United Sound Systems, Detroit
- Genre: Soul
- Label: Tamla Records
- Producer: Leonard Caston

Eddie Kendricks chronology
Goin' Up in Smoke (1976)	Slick (1977)	Vintage '78 (1978)

Singles from Slick
- 1. "Intimate Friends" Released: December 22, 1977

Professional ratings
Review scores
Source	Rating
Allmusic	2/5 stars

Slick is the ninth album by former Temptations vocalist Eddie Kendricks, released in August 1977 on the Tamla imprint of Motown Records. It reached No. 47 on the Billboard Soul Albums chart.

== Track listing ==
1. "Something Shady (Is Going On)" (Leonard Caston Jr., Ronn Matlock) 5:07
2. "Baby" (Leonard Caston Jr., Terri McFaddin) 3:52
3. "I Want to Live My Life with You" (Diane Goosby, Leonard Caston Jr.) 3:42
4. "You Got It" (Leonard Caston Jr., Terri McFaddin) 3:25
5. "Intimate Friends" (Garry Glenn) 5:49
6. "Diamond Girl" (Jim Seals, Dash Crofts) 4:25
7. "Then Came You" (Diane Goosby, Leonard Caston Jr.) 7:31
8. "I'll Have to Let You Go" (Kathy Wakefield, Leonard Caston Jr.) 4:34
9. "California Woman" (Kathy Wakefield, Leonard Caston Jr.) 3:31

== Personnel ==
- Eddie Kendricks - lead and backing vocals
- Eddie Willis, Robert White - guitar
- Lee Marcus, Quentin Dennard, Richard "Pistol" Allen, Uriel Jones - drums
- Roderick Chandler - bass
- George Roundtree, Leonard Caston Jr. - keyboards
- Jack Brokensha - percussion
- Gerry Paul - congas
- Larry Nozero - alto saxophone
- Barbara Dickerson, Carolyn Majors, Cheryl Lynn, Danny Smith, Donna Thedford, Jean Thompson, Patricia Smith, Phylis Cole, Theo Turner, Victor Caston - backing vocals
- David Willardson - cover illustration

== Charts ==
Chart (1977)	Peak position
Billboard Top Soul Albums	47

=== Singles ===
Year	Single	Chart positions
Year	Single	US R&B
1978	"Intimate Friends"	24

== Samples ==
- "Intimate Friends" has been sampled by multiple artists for various songs, including:
  - "Goin' In For Life" by Drake from Comeback Season.
  - "Light" by Big Sean from I Decided.
  - "Unbreakable" by Alicia Keys from Unplugged.
  - "Fall in Love (Your Funeral)" by Erykah Badu from New Amerykah Part Two (Return of the Ankh).
  - "Another Summer" by 213 from their The Hard Way album.
  - "Old Times Sake" by Sweet Sable from the soundtrack to Above the Rim.
  - "A Penny For My Thoughts" by Common (known at the time as Common Sense) from Can I Borrow a Dollar?.
