= All by Myself (Eddie Kendricks album) =

All By Myself

Studio album by Eddie Kendricks
- Released: April 1971
- Recorded: 1970–1971
- Genre: Soul
- Length: 29:04
- Label: Tamla
- Producer: Frank Wilson

Eddie Kendricks chronology
All By Myself (1971)	People ... Hold On (1972)

Singles from All By Myself
- 1. "This Used To Be The Home Of Johnnie Mae / It's So Hard For Me To Say Goodbye" Released: March 4, 1971; 2. "I Did It All For You / Can I" Released: July 27, 1971

Professional ratings
Review scores
Source	Rating
AllMusic	4.5/5 stars
The Encyclopedia of Popular Music	3/5 stars
The New Rolling Stone Record Guide	3/5 stars

All By Myself is the debut solo album by the former Temptations vocalist Eddie Kendricks. It was released in 1971 on Tamla Records.

The opening track, "Let's Go Back to Day One", appeared in the Diana Ross movie Mahogany, directed by Berry Gordy.

== Track listing ==
1. "Let's Go Back to Day One" (Gloria Jones, Patrice Holloway) 3:30
2. "This Used to Be the Home of Johnnie Mae" (Leonard Caston, Jr., Samual Small) 5:40
3. "I Did It All for You" (Frank Wilson, Jimmy Webb) 2:58
4. "It's So Hard for Me to Say Good-Bye" (Frank Wilson, Pam Sawyer) 3:08
5. "Something's Burning" (Mac Davis) 4:27
6. "Can I" (Hal Davis, Herman Griffith) 6:12
7. "Didn't We" (Jimmy Webb) 3:09

== Charts ==
Year	Album	Chart positions	
Year	Album	US	US R&B
1971	All By Myself	80	6

=== Singles ===
Year	Single	Chart positions		
Year	Single	US	US R&B	US Dance
1971	"Can I"	—	37	—
1971	"It's So Hard For Me To Say Good-Bye"	88	37	—
