= A Penny for Your Thoughts =

A Penny for Your Thoughts may refer to:

- "A Penny for Your Thoughts" (The Twilight Zone), a 1961 television episode
- "Penny for Your Thoughts" (Medium), 2005 television episode
- "Penny for Your Thoughts" (Slow Horses), 2024 television episode
- "A Penny for Your Thoughts" (song), 1982, by Tavares
- "Penny for Your Thoughts", a 1975 song by Peter Frampton from the album Frampton

== See also ==
- A Penny for My Thoughts, a board game
