= New Directions (Tavares album) =

Studio album by Tavares
- Released: November 1982
- Genre: R&B, soul
- Length: 36:39
- Label: RCA Victor
- Producer: Benjamin F. Wright, Jr. (tracks: 8), Jay Senter (tracks: 1–4, 7, 10, 11), Kenny Nolan (tracks: 1–4, 7, 10, 11), Ric Wyatt, Jr. (tracks: 5, 6, 9, 12)

Tavares chronology
Loveline (1981)	New Directions (1982)	Words and Music (1983)

New Directions is the eleventh album by American soul/R&B group Tavares, released in 1982. It is the group's first album for RCA Records following their departure from Capitol. Lead single "A Penny for Your Thoughts" peaked at #16 on the R&B chart and #33 on the Billboard Hot 100, the group's highest placing on that chart since 1977, and which would turn out to be their last single to register there. The track was nominated for a Grammy Award in 1982. New Directions reached #30 on the R&B albums chart.

== Track listing ==
1. "A Penny for Your Thoughts" - 4:29
2. "I Hope You'll Be Very Unhappy Without Me" - 3:59
3. "Mystery Lady" - 3:51
4. "Abra-Ca-Dabra Love You Too" - 4:18
5. "Got to Find My Way Back to You" - 5:16
6. "Maybe We'll Fall In Love Again" - 5:06
7. "The Skin You're In" - 5:07
8. "Wanna Be Close to You" - 4:33

== Singles ==
- "A Penny for Your Thoughts" (US Pop #33, US R&B #16)
- "Got to Find My Way Back to You" (US R&B #24)
- "Abra-Ca-Dabra Love You Too"
