= People...Hold On =

1972 album by Eddie Kendricks

Studio album by Eddie Kendricks
- Released: May 1972
- Recorded: January 1972
- Genre: Soul; dance
- Length: 41:46
- Label: Tamla Records
- Producer: Frank Wilson; Leonard Caston Jr.; Bobby Miller

Eddie Kendricks chronology
All by Myself (1971)	People...Hold On (1972)	Eddie Kendricks (1973)

Singles from People...Hold On
- 1. "Eddie's Love" Released: March 23, 1972; 2. "If You Let Me" Released: August 31, 1972; 3. "Girl You Need a Change of Mind" Released: January 9, 1973

People...Hold On is the second studio album by the American singer Eddie Kendricks, released in May 1972, by Tamla Records. His second album after leaving the Temptations in 1971, it proved to be his breakout album. The album charted at number 131 on the Billboard Top LPs and Tape and number 13 on Soul LPs. The album was recorded in the Hitsville U.S.A. studio, and it was one of the last projects completed there before Motown's move to Los Angeles. It marked a departure from Kendricks' previous pop-oriented sound, embracing a more socially conscious and urban style. The album produced three singles, with "Girl You Need a Change of Mind" standing out as a prototype of disco records and becoming popular in New York City dance clubs. Other tracks explored themes of love and spirituality. The album has been described as a significant departure from Kendricks' sound not seen in his later releases. The album's tracks have been sampled by artists including Erykah Badu, J Dilla, Lil Wayne, and Drake, and covered by Amber Mark, Billy Valentine, and D'Angelo.

== Background and recording ==
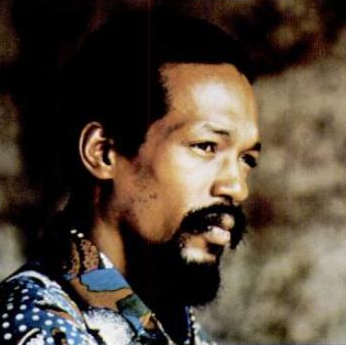
Eddie Kendricks in 1972.

Eddie Kendricks had been a founding member of the Temptations since 1960. However, by 1971, the internal drama within the group had taken a toll on him. Seeking a fresh start, Kendricks signed a solo deal with Motown, marking the beginning of his solo career. In April 1971, Kendricks released his debut solo album, All by Myself, which peaked at number 80 on the Billboard Top LPs & Tape.

That same year, he discovered the band the Young Senators, who had formed in 1965 and had just released their debut single, "Jungle," which rose to number one on local and regional R&B music charts. Kendricks met the band's leader, Jimi Dougans, and asked him if they wanted to be his backing band on tours, and Dougans agreed without consulting the other members. The Young Senators began touring with Kendricks the following year and started recording his next album.

The album was recorded in January 1972 and was one of the last albums to be recorded at Motown's Hitsville U.S.A. studio before the label's move to Los Angeles. According to Dougans, Kendricks, along with the engineers, producers, and session musicians, stayed up until three o'clock in the morning to record the track "Girl You Need a Change of Mind."

== Music ==
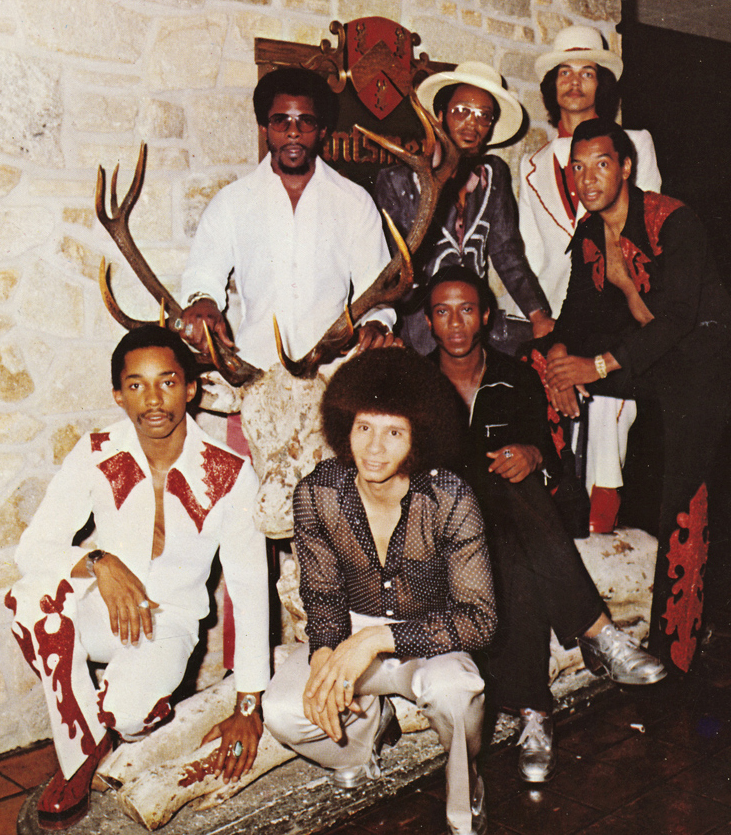
The Young Senators, who toured with Kendricks and played on People...Hold On.

People...Hold On is noted for being less pop-oriented, with DownBeat describing the music as "the sound of the streets." The tracks "If You Let Me" and "Eddie's Love," both released as singles, featured two-step rhythms and horn charts that were "steeped in an urban sound," created to resonate with a specific demographic rather than appealing to all of the United States. The third single, "Girl You Need a Change of Mind," is noted for its gospel influence, with Frank Wilson's production featuring strings and a breakdown and buildup. This track has been described as a prototype for the disco genre and later became popular in New York City dance clubs. In the song, he touches on women's rights, questioning the process and expressing his concerns by asking why women marched in picket lines. The track runs for nearly eight minutes, with a radio version being released by Motown.

"My People...Hold On" uses a syncopated chant and African percussion, with Kendricks alternating between his falsetto and a deeper voice throughout the track. He described the song to Disc as "a spiritual song," encouraging people to hold on to love, emphasizing its lasting importance. "Someday We’ll Have A Better World" features Kendricks dreaming of a utopian world, while "Day by Day" portrays Kendricks wanting comfort from a broken heart in the rainfall.

== Reception and commercial performance ==
Professional ratings
Review scores
Source	Rating
AllMusic	4.5/5 stars

The album charted moderately well, peaking at number 13 on Billboard’s Soul LPs chart and reaching number 131 on the Top LPs & Tape. Billboard described the album as having Kendricks' "best performance to date" with "good arrangements and variety." This success helped to elevate Eddie Kendricks' profile during the early stages of his solo career after leaving The Temptations. Lindsay Planer of AllMusic described People...Hold On as "dabbling with communally conscious soul and making initial forays into dance music that would predate disco," giving the album 4.5 out of 5 stars.

Andrew Hamilton described People...Hold On as an example of why best-of and greatest-hits compilations aren't definitive, saying that much of the album's material went unnoticed. He praised "My People...Hold On" for its strong social message and highlighted "If You Let Me" as showcasing some of Kendricks' best vocal performances. Jared Boyd of Al.com described it as an "expansive journey of sound," highlighting Kendricks' decision to create a "risky soul manifesto" instead of relying on his previous success with The Temptations.

== Impact and legacy ==
People...Hold On was released during a pivotal moment in American history, coinciding with the rise of the Black power movement. A year prior, Stevie Wonder released Where I'm Coming From, and shortly after, Marvin Gaye's What's Going On was released. The album marked a significant departure in Kendricks' sound, showcasing a more socially conscious and dance-oriented approach. However, Kendricks did not fully capitalize on this new direction and instead scaled back his sound in subsequent releases.

Multiple songs from the album were sampled in other songs. "My People...Hold On" was sampled in Erykah Badu's "My People" from her 2008 album New Amerykah Part One (4th World War) and in J Dilla's "People" from his 2006 album Donuts. "Date with the Rain" was sampled in Lil Wayne's "Let the Beat Build" from his 2008 album Tha Carter III, produced by Deezle and Kanye West. The Canadian rapper Drake sampled the song "Just Memories" on "Ratchet Happy Birthday" from his 2018 album Scorpion.

Songs from the album have also been covered by various artists. In June 2020, the American singer Amber Mark covered "My People...Hold On" as a response to the George Floyd protests, stating that it was "time to bring more positive force into this world." The cover was the fourth track in her Covered-19 series, with the music video, directed by Mark herself with choreography by Morgan Marie Grayned, features Mark and dancers in white dresses performing on a rooftop. Pitchfork praised the video, describing it as offering "a nourishing vision of beauty that feels especially potent in this time of unrest." In May 2023, the vocalist Billy Valentine covered the song on his album Billy Valentine and the Universal Truth. The song "Girl You Need a Change of Mind" was covered by D'Angelo for the 1996 film Get on the Bus.

== Track listing ==
All tracks produced by Frank Wilson except where noted.

People...Hold On standard track listing
No.	Title	Writer(s)	Length
1.	"If You Let Me"	Frank Wilson	3:10
2.	"Let Me Run Into Your Lonely Heart"	Wilson; Anita Poree	2:59
3.	"Day by Day" ( Wilson; Caston Jr.)	Leonard Caston Jr.; Terri McFaddin	3:07
4.	"Girl You Need a Change of Mind" ( Wilson; Caston Jr.)	Poree; Caston Jr.	7:30
5.	"Someday We'll Have a Better World"	Norma Toney	3:35
6.	"My People...Hold On" ( Wilson; Caston Jr.)	Poree; Caston Jr.	5:40
7.	"Date with the Rain" ( Miller)	Bobby Miller	2:42
8.	"Eddie's Love" ( Wilson; Caston Jr.)	Poree; Caston Jr.	3:20
9.	"I'm on the Sideline"	Penelope McClendon	2:56
10.	"Just Memories" ( Wilson; Caston Jr.)	Poree; Caston Jr.	5:50
Total length:			41:46

== Credits and personnel ==
- Eddie Kendricks – vocals
- The Young Senators – rhythm
- Cal Harris – Moog synthesizer
- Joe Messina – guitar
- Eddie "Bongo" Brown – congas
- David Leacraft, David Van De Pitte, Leroy Fleming – arrangements
- Weldon A. McDougal III – photography

== Charts ==
Chart (1972)	Peak position
US Billboard 200	131
US Top R&B/Hip-Hop Albums (Billboard)	13
