= The Young Senators =

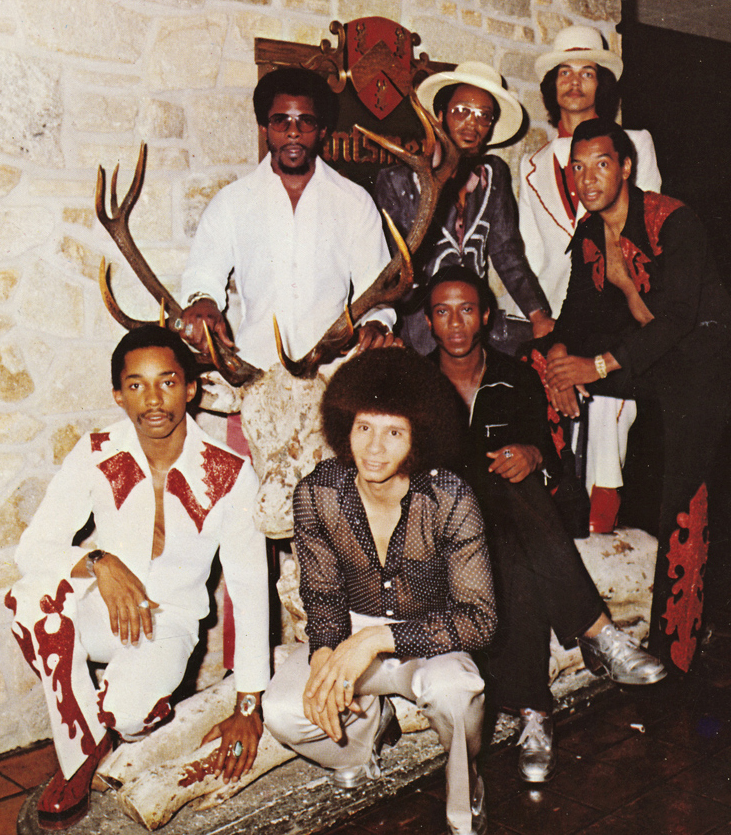
- The Young Senators in the 1970s

Background information
- Also known as: The Young Senators Reloaded (2017–present)
- Origin: Washington, D.C., U.S.
- Genres: Go-go
- Years active: 1965–1970s; 2017–present
- Labels: Innovation; Epic
- Members: Frank Hooker; James Johnson
- Past members: See Band members

The Young Senators, currently known as The Young Senators Reloaded, is an American go-go band formed in Washington, D.C. in 1965. The band consisted of percussionist Jimi Dougans, guitarist Calvin Charity, vocalist Derek David, keyboardist Frank Hooker, drummer James Johnson, saxophonist Leroy Fleming, and bassist Wornell Jones.

Originally based in the D.C. area, The Young Senators released their debut single, "Jungle," which quickly rose to the top of regional R&B music charts. Their success led to an opportunity to meet Eddie Kendricks, who had just left The Temptations, and they became his backing band, making them the first road band to record with a major Motown artist. The Young Senators had a rivalry with other go-go innovators like Chuck Brown and The Soul Searchers, although The Soul Searchers later became the dominant band in D.C. after The Young Senators left to tour with Kendricks. They performed on Kendricks's 1972 sophomore album People...Hold On and contributed to his 1973 hit single "Keep On Truckin'."

They have been described as one of the key bands that helped develop the go-go subgenre of funk in Washington, D.C., alongside The Soul Searchers and other influential groups. Sometimes referred to as "The Emperors of Go-Go," the band reformed in 2017 as The Young Senators Reloaded and resumed performing with new members.

== History ==
=== Formation and "Jungle" ===
The Young Senators were formed in 1965 in Washington D.C. by Jimi Dougans, Calvin Charity, Derek David, Frank Hooker, James Johnson, Leroy Fleming, and Wornell Jones, who were teenagers in high school. They initially started out as a band doing Motown-style soul but gradually evolved into a funkier style. In 1971, the group released their debut single, "Jungle," bundled with the song "The Way Things Are," on their label Innovation. The track is credited with pioneering the prototype for the go-go subgenre of funk music. The song rose to number one on local and regional R&B music charts, which led to an opportunity for the group to meet Eddie Kendricks, who had just begun his solo career. Kendricks asked leader Jimi Dougans if The Young Senators wanted to be his backing band, and Dougans agreed without consulting the other members. That same year, they released their follow-up single "Ringing Bells (Sweet Music)," which Mike Apichella of Splice Today described as "weirder, louder, and more experimental than their debut," noting that the hook was inspired by the classic holiday standard "Carol of the Bells."

=== Working with Eddie Kendricks ===
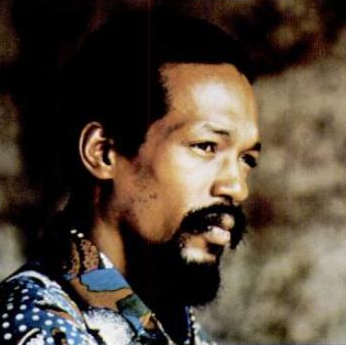
In 1972, the group started touring with Eddie Kendricks (pictured) and recorded for his album People...Hold On.

They began extensively touring with Eddie Kendricks, and in 1972, they recorded with him on his second studio album People...Hold On. DownBeat described their contributions to the album as pivotal, helping to advance Kendricks' career and marking a significant shift in Motown's musical direction. Through their collaboration, they became the first road band to record with a major Motown artist. The song "Girl You Need a Change of Mind" from Kendricks's album later became popular in New York City dance clubs and has since been credited as a proto-disco classic. The group later provided backing vocals on Eddie Kendricks's hit song "Keep On Truckin'" in 1973. After The Young Senators left to tour with Eddie Kendricks, the rivalry between them and The Soul Searchers eased, allowing The Soul Searchers to become the prominent band in Washington, D.C., as The Young Senators were no longer around.

=== Accolades and reuniting ===
In 1996, the Mayor of the District of Columbia, Anthony A. Williams, proclaimed June 11 as The Young Senators Day in the city. In 2002, the band was inducted into the Go-Go Hall of Fame. In 2017, the band reunited to perform at the Howard Theatre under the name The Young Senators Reloaded. In 2024, The Young Senators were included in an exhibit in the Anacostia neighborhood of Washington, D.C. The exhibit prominently featured the group alongside other notable artists from the area, such as Marvin Gaye and the Dynamic Superiors.

== Artistry and legacy ==
The Young Senators have been credited with innovating the go-go genre alongside Chuck Brown and his band, Black Heat. The Washington Informer described them as having "the greatest influence on the development and evolution of go-go." The Young Senators have sometimes been called "The Emperors of Go-Go."

When they were with Kendricks, they were described by Stephanie Curtis of The Peninsula Times Tribune as having a "driving beat and fine control of their material" that complemented Kendricks' "heavy soul style." Additionally, Dennis Hunt of the Los Angeles Times noted at a show that they "were so good throughout the performance that I often found myself listening more to them than to Kendricks." John Wendeborn of The Oregonian described The Young Senators as a band that "generated a little energy on their own" but added "a lot of pizzazz" and served as "a perfect counter to the singer's easy style." On People...Hold On, the group are described as "providing [a] hazy psych-soul" to the album as Kendricks's backing band.

== Band members ==
Information from various sources:

Current members

- Frank Hooker – vocals, keyboards
- James Johnson – drums

Former members

- Jimi Dougans – vocals, percussion (died 2025)
- Leroy Fleming – saxophone
- Wornell Jones – bass
- Derek David - vocals
- Calvin Charity – guitar
- Howard Crouch – guitar
- Naamon "Chip" Jones – bass
- John Engram – guitar
- Clyde Stubblefield – drummer (died 2017)
- Philip Guilbeau – trumpet
- Wayne Hines
- Warren Smith
- Charles Newton
- David Lecraft

== Discography ==
List of singles as lead artist showing year released and album name
Title	Year	Album
"Jungle"	1971	Non-album singles
"Ringing Bells (Sweet Music)"	1972	Non-album singles
"Ride The Tide"	1976	Non-album singles
"Boogie Music"	1976	Non-album singles
