= Supercharged (Tavares album) =

Studio album by Tavares
- Released: February 1980
- Studio: Capitol Studios (Hollywood); Sunset Sound Recorders (Hollywood); Conway Recording Studios (Hollywood); Location Recording Service (Burbank)
- Genre: R&B, soul
- Length: 37:28
- Label: Capitol
- Producer: David Foster, Benjamin Wright, Bobby Colomby

Tavares chronology
Madam Butterfly (1979)	Supercharged (1980)	Love Uprising (1980)

Professional ratings
Review scores
Source	Rating
AllMusic	3/5 stars
The Encyclopedia of Popular Music	3/5 stars
The New Rolling Stone Record Guide	3/5 stars

Supercharged is the eighth album by the American soul/R&B group Tavares. It was produced by David Foster, Benjamin Wright and Bobby Colomby, and released in 1980 on Capitol Records. Supercharged is similar in style to the group's previous album Madam Butterfly, although not as highly regarded at its predecessor. Lead single "Bad Times" reached the R&B top 10 and #47 on the pop chart, the group's first showing on that chart since "More Than a Woman" in 1977. Supercharged made #20 on the R&B chart and #75 on the pop chart.

== Critical reception ==
AllMusic stated that "this respectable, if uneven, effort contains a few gems, including the sociopolitical 'Bad Times' (a number ten R&B hit) and the Stylistics-influenced 'I Just Can't Go on Living Without You'." In a retrospective review for SoulTracks, Chris Rizik wrote that the group "tested their own versatility on this disc, and showed that they were more than capable", describing it as "like a 'hits' package masked as a studio release". While calling it "the least cohesive of [their] albums on Capitol Records", they described it as "a disc that still wears well more than 30 years later".

== Track listing ==
Supercharged track listing
No.	Title	Writer(s)	Producer(s)	Length
1.	"Bad Times"	Gerald McMahon	Bobby Colomby	7:15
2.	"We Both Tried"	Bill Champlin; David Foster	Foster	4:15
3.	"Can't Get Enough"	Tony Coleman; Kathy Wakefield; Benjamin Wright	Wright	3:49
4.	"Why Can't We Fall in Love"	Foster; Carole Bayer Sager; Deniece Williams	Wright	4:09
5.	"I Can't Go On Living Without You"	Wright	Wright	5:13
6.	"I Don't Want You Anymore"	Champlin; Foster	Foster	4:03
7.	"Paradise"	Teddy Randazzo	Colomby	4:58
8.	"Got to Have Your Love"	Patrick Henderson; Angelo Richards	Colomby	3:46
Total length:				37:28

"Bad Times", "Paradise", and "Got to Have Your Love" were recorded at Capitol Studios and Location Sound Service. "We Both Tried", and "I Don't Want You Anymore" were recorded at Sunset Sound Recorders. "Can't Get Enough", "Why Can't We Fall in Love", and "I Can't Go On Living Without You" were recorded at Conway Recording Studios.

== Singles ==
- "Bad Times" (US Pop #47, US R&B #10)
- "I Can't Go On Living Without You" (US R&B #42)

== Personnel ==
Adapted from the liner notes.

Tavares

- Butch Tavares – lead vocals (7)
- Chubby Tavares – lead vocals (1)
- Pooch Tavares – lead vocals (1)
- Ralph Tavares – lead vocals (1)
- Tiny Taraves – lead vocals (8)

Additional musicians

- John Barnes – keyboards (3–5)
- Eddie "Bongo" Brown – percussion (3–5)
- Bill Champlin – keyboards (6)
- Bobby Colomby – percussion (1, 7, 8)
- David Foster – keyboards (2, 6), string arrangement (2)
- Steven George – synthesizer (1, 7), Minimoog solo (7)
- Jay Graydon – guitar (2, 6)
- Ed Greene – drums (1, 2, 6–8)
- Patrick Henderson – piano (8)
- Jim Hirsen – synthesizer (3–5)
- David Hungate – bass (2)
- Paul Jackson Jr. – guitar (1, 7, 8)
- James Jamerson Jr. – bass (3–5)
- Paul Lani – percussion (6)
- Steve Lukather – guitar (2, 6)
- Ed Mann – percussion (1, 7)
- Harvey Mason – drums (3–5)
- Timothy James May – guitar (1, 7), acoustic guitar (7)
- Dale Oehler – piano (1), orchestration (1, 7)
- Greg Phillinganes – electric piano (1), piano (7)
- David Shields – bass (1, 6–8)
- Frederick Walker – percussion (3–5)
- David Williams – guitar (3–5)

Horn musicians

- Gary Grant – horns (1, 2, 8)
- Larry G. Hall – horns (1, 8)
- Jerry Hey – horns (1, 2, 8), horn arrangement (2, 8)
- Kim S. Hutchcroft – horns (1, 8)
- Lew McCreary – horns (2)
- Bill Reichenbach Jr. – horns (1, 2, 8)
- Larry Williams – horns (1, 8)
- George Bohanon – trombone, contractor (3–5)
- Garnett Brown – trombone (3–5)
- Don Cook – trombone (3–5)
- Maurice Spears – trombone (3–5)
- Oscar Brashear – trumpet (3–5)
- Bobby Bryant – trumpet (3–5)
- Nolan Smith – trumpet (3–5)
- Pete Christlieb – saxophone (1)
- Vince DeRosa – French horn (2)
- Art Maebe – French horn (1)
- Brian D.A. O'Connor – French horn (1)
- Henry Sigismonti – French horn (1, 2)
- Jeff Clayton – reeds (3–5)
- Fred Jackson Jr. – reeds (3–5)

String musicians

- Jo Anne Swenson – string contractor
- Brenton B. Banks – viola (1–5)
- Marilyn Hanthorn Baker – viola (1–5, 7)
- Rollice E. Dale – viola (1–3, 7), principal viola (4, 5)
- James E. Ross – viola (3–5)
- Laury J. Woods – viola (1, 2, 7)
- Ronald Clark – violin (3–5)
- Mark Cargill – violin (1–5, 7)
- Pavel Farkas – violin (3–5)
- Pam Gates – violin (1, 2, 7)
- Harris Goldman – violin (1–5, 7)
- Joseph Goodman – violin (3–5)
- Gina Kronstadt – violin (1–5, 7)
- Robert Lipsett – violin (3–5)
- Patrick Morgan – violin (1, 2, 7)
- Jerome Joseph Reisler – violin (1, 2, 7)
- Henry L. Roth – violin (1, 2, 7)
- Roberleigh Barnhart – cello (3–5)
- Ronald B. Cooper – cello (1, 2, 7)
- Albert Edward Gill – cello (1, 2, 7)
- Jacqueline Lustgarden – cello (1, 2, 7)
- Miguel Martinez – cello (1–5, 7)

Technical personnel

- F. Byron Clark – mixing engineering (3–5), recording engineering (2, 6)
- David Cole – recording engineering (1, 7, 8)
- Bobby Colomby – production (1, 7, 8), mixing engineering (1, 2, 7, 8), executive production
- Humberto Gatica – recording & mixing engineering (2, 6)
- Charles Faris – recording engineering (1, 7, 8)
- David Foster – production & mixing engineering (2, 6)
- Don Henderson – recording engineering (1, 7, 8)
- Mark Linett – additional engineering (6)
- Mike Linett – additional engineering (2)
- Rick Ruggieri – additional engineering (2, 6)
- Michael Verdick – recording engineering (1, 7, 8), mixing engineering (1, 2, 7, 8)
- Benjamin F. Wright Jr. – production (3–5)
- Charles Bush – photography
- Roy Kohara – art direction
- Shusei Nagaoka – illustration
