= Feliciano Vierra Tavares =

American musician (1920–2008)

- Born: Feliciano Vierra Tavares Senior; October 29, 1920; Providence, Rhode Island, U.S
- Died: December 17, 2008 (aged 88); Hyannis, Massachusetts, U.S
- Occupations: Musician, singer, guitarist
- Known for: Father of the Tavares Brothers
- Children: Arthur Paul Tavares; Feliciano Vierra Tavares, Jr.; Perry Lee Tavares; Ralph Vierra Tavares; Antone Lee Tavares

Feliciano Vierra "Flash" Tavares Sr. (October 29, 1920 – December 17, 2008) was a Cape Verdean American musician, singer and guitarist based in Massachusetts. He was the patriarch of the musical Tavares family, which included the Tavares Brothers, a successful Grammy-winning R&B band in the 1970s and 1980s. The band was made from five of Tavares' sons. Tavares was known professionally as Flash.

== Early life ==
Tavares was born in Providence, Rhode Island, on October 29, 1920. He was a self-taught musician who learned by listening to the radio and Cape Verdean music at an early age. Tavares, a long time resident of Hyannis, Massachusetts, was considered to be an influential cultural figure within the Cape Verdean American community in Rhode Island and Massachusetts. The father of all five members of Tavares, whose hits included "It Only Takes a Minute" and "Heaven Must Be Missing an Angel", Tavares advocated for the traditional Cape Verdean music. Following his death in 2008, it was noted that "Flash inspired a lot of kids to play music, and he kept the Cape Verdean musical heritage alive." Tavares remained active within the musical community in his 80s despite an early diagnosis of prostate cancer. He was able to travel to Cape Verde and continued to perform solo until he was 84 years old. In 2007, Tavares and his sister, singer Vicki Vierra, were inducted into the Hall of Fame at the Cape Verdean museum in East Providence, Rhode Island.

== Death ==
Feliciano "Flash" Vierra Tavares died at his home in Hyannis, Massachusetts, on December 17, 2008, at the age of 88. He was survived by his second wife of 38 years, Grace. His first wife, Albina Gomes Tavares (1913–1981, the mother of the five Tavares brothers), and daughter, Eva Baptiste, as well as 10 siblings had predeceased him. He was also survived by three daughters Jenny Mello, Deolinda Borges, Kathleen Clarke; seven sons (including all five members of the Tavares brothers) John Baptiste, Ralph, Arthur, Antone, Victor, Feliciano Jr., and Perry Tavares; one sister, Victoria Tavares Vierra; and 53 grandchildren, 49 great-grandchildren and 18 great-great-grandchildren.

Tavares, a 35-year member of the Baháʼí Faith community of Barnstable, Massachusetts, was buried at St. Francis Xavier Cemetery in Centerville, Massachusetts.

== See also ==
- Tavares
- Music of Cape Verde
- Cape Verdean Americans
