= Eddie Kendricks (album) =

Studio album by Eddie Kendricks
- Released: May 1973
- Recorded: 1973
- Genre: Soul
- Label: Tamla Records
- Producer: Frank Wilson, Leonard Caston, Gloria Jones, Pam Sawyer

Eddie Kendricks chronology
People ... Hold On (1972)	Eddie Kendricks (1973)	Boogie Down! (1974)

Singles from Eddie Kendricks
- 1. "Darling Come Back Home" Released: April 19, 1973; 2. "Keep On Truckin' (Part 1)" Released: July 29, 1973

Eddie Kendricks is the third album by former Temptations vocalist Eddie Kendricks. It was released in the spring of 1973 on Tamla Records.

== Reception ==
Professional ratings
Review scores
Source	Rating
AllMusic	3.5/5 stars
Christgau's Record Guide	C−

This was the breakthrough solo album Eddie Kendricks was looking for. Charting on the pop chart at number eighteen and number five on the R&B chart. This was his only solo album that would land in the top 20 on the pop chart. Includes the number-one pop and R&B single "Keep On Truckin'", which is one of the precursor to disco songs to come out before the explosion of the genre.

This album established Kendricks as the most successful member of the Temptations to go solo. He was the only former member of the group to have a number-one Hot 100 single.

== Track listing ==
=== Side One ===
1. "Only Room for Two" (Don Daniels, Terri McFaddin) 3:02
2. "Darling Come Back Home" (Frank Wilson, Kathy Wakefield, King Errisson) 4:07
3. "Each Day I Cry a Little" (Leonard Caston, Terri McFaddin) 7:14
4. "Can't Help What I Am" (Frank Wilson, Kathy Wakefield, Leonard Caston) 4:24

=== Side Two ===
1. "Keep On Truckin'" (Anita Poree, Frank Wilson, Leonard Caston) 8:02
2. "Any Day Now" (Bob Hilliard, Burt Bacharach) 5:09
3. "Not on the Outside" (Larry Roberts, Sylvia Robinson) 4:35
4. "Where Do You Go (Baby)" (Gloria Jones, Pam Sawyer) 3:24

== Personnel ==
- Eddie Kendricks - lead and backing vocals
- Ice Cold Love - backing vocals
- Darrell Clayborn, James Jamerson - bass
- Billy Cooper, Dean Parks, Greg Poree - guitar
- Ed Greene, Kenny "Spider" Rice - drums
- Harold Johnson - piano, organ
- Leonard Caston Jr. - piano, organ, clavinet
- King Errisson - congas
- Lezli Valentine - backing vocals on "Not on the Outside"
- Frank Wilson, James Anthony Carmichael, Leonard Caston Jr. - arrangements
- Jerry Long - orchestration direction
- Jim Britt - photography

== Charts ==
Year	Album	Chart positions	
Year	Album	US	US R&B
1973	Eddie Kendricks	18	5

=== Singles ===
Year	Single	Chart positions		
Year	Single	US	US R&B	US Dance
1973	"Darling Come Back Home"	67	26	—
1973	"Keep on Truckin'"	1	1	—
