= Love Uprising =

Studio album by Tavares
- Released: December 1980
- Genres: R&B, soul
- Length: 40:56
- Label: Capitol
- Producer: Benjamin Wright

Tavares chronology
| Supercharged (1980) | Love Uprising (1980) | Loveline (1981) |

Professional ratings
Review scores
| Source | Rating |
|---|---|
| AllMusic | 3/5 stars |
| The Encyclopedia of Popular Music | 3/5 stars |
| The New Rolling Stone Record Guide | 3/5 stars |

Love Uprising is an album by the American soul/R&B group Tavares. It was produced by Benjamin Wright and released in 1980 on Capitol Records. Love Uprising at the time was Tavares' least successful album, their first to fail to register on either the pop or the R&B top 100.

== Track listing ==
1. "Only One I Need to Love" (Jerry Taylor) - 3:12
2. "Break Down for Love" (Benjamin Wright, Kathy Wakefield, Feliciano Tavares) - 4:39
3. "Love Uprising" (Angela Winbush, René Moore) - 5:40
4. "Loneliness" (Benjamin Wright, Louis Price) - 3:12
5. "Knock the Wall Down" (Stephen Kipner) - 2:55
6. "Hot Love" (Benjamin Wright, Kathy Wakefield, Feliciano Tavares) - 3:06
7. "Don't Wanna Say Goodnight" (Keith Echols, Anthony Miller, Alice Sanderson) - 3:35
8. "Do You Believe in Love" (Benjamin Wright, Kathy Wakefield, Feliciano Tavares, Perry Tavares) - 3:35
9. "She Can Wait Forever" (Geoffrey Leib) - 3:36
10. "In This Lovely World" (Jerry Taylor) - 3:45
11. "Life Time of Love" (Geoffrey Leib) - 3:11

== Singles ==
- "Love Uprising" (US R&B No. 17)
- "Loneliness" (US R&B No. 64)
