= Shoeshine boy (disambiguation) =

A shoeshine boy is someone who shines shoes.

Shoeshine boy or shoe shine boy may also refer to:

- "Shoeshine Boy", a 1975 song by singer Eddie Kendricks
- Shoeshine Boy (Underdog), a character from the animated series Underdog
- "Chattanoogie Shoe Shine Boy", a 1950 song by Red Foley
- "Shoeshine Boy", a 1970 song by The Humblebums

== See also ==
- Shoeshine (disambiguation)
