= Girl You Need a Change of Mind =

1972 single by Eddie Kendricks

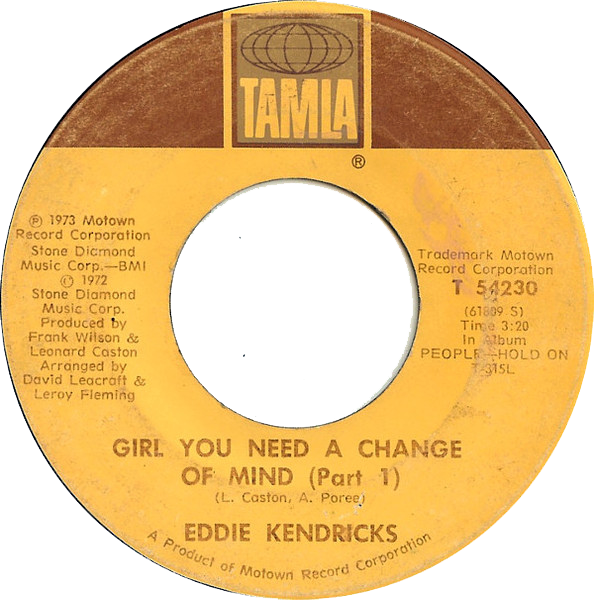

Single by Eddie Kendricks

from the album People...Hold On
- Released: January 9, 1973
- Recorded: 1972
- Genre: Soul; disco
- Label: Tamla
- Songwriters: Leonard Caston Jr.; Anita Poree
- Producers: Frank Wilson; Caston Jr.

Audio sample
- A 30-second sample of "Girl You Need a Change of Mind" showing the song's production, described as a prototype of disco.: file; help

"Girl You Need a Change of Mind" is a song by American singer Eddie Kendricks. First recorded in January 1972 and featured on his album People...Hold On, the track was co-produced by Frank Wilson and features Kendricks' falsetto vocals over a midtempo arrangement with gospel-influenced strings and a breakdown. Though not a commercial hit, it became an underground dance anthem in New York City and is noted for being a prototype for the disco genre.

== Background and release ==
In 1971, Eddie Kendricks discovered The Young Senators, a band that had recently gained attention with their debut single, "Jungle," which topped local and regional R&B charts. After meeting with the band’s leader, Jimi Dougans, Kendricks invited them to be his backing band, and they soon began touring with him and recording his next album. They recorded it in January of 1972, and according to Dougans himself, Kendricks, the engineer, producers, and band members were up at three o'clock in the morning to record the song, driven by the high energy in the studio.

== Music and lyrics ==
The instrumental of the song consists of a kick drum on a midtempo beat, a deep bassline, horns, and a piano melody. Kendricks' falsetto vocals are over this arrangement. The song is noted for its gospel influence, with Frank Wilson's production featuring strings, and a dramatic breakdown and buildup. The lyrics of "Girl You Need a Change of Mind" explore themes of love and relationships, emphasizing the idea that love is a formless entity where power dynamics between men and women were not present. Kendricks also addresses the women's rights movement and the women's liberation movement in North America, expressing concerns by questioning why women marched in picket lines.

== Critical reception ==
Lindsay Planer of AllMusic described it as "nothing short of an epic precursor to the extended four-on-the-floor numbers that would soon be christened as "disco."" Andrew Hamilton called it as having "wicked rhythms and urgent singing by Kendricks". "Girl You Need a Change of Mind" was included in Pitchfork's list of the top 200 best songs of the 1970s, ranking at number 173. Author Brad Nelson described the track as "decidedly unpsychedelic," but noted that it also had "something hallucinatory" in its feel. It was also featured in UDiscoverMusic's list of the Best 70s Songs, and while the site noted that the lyrics "may not be lyrically PC," they praised the track for its "dramatic approach and steady-rolling beat."

== Impact and usage ==
Although the single never became a commercial hit, "Girl You Need a Change of Mind" persisted as an underground dance anthem, particularly in New York City clubs. According to Tim Lawrence, American DJ David Mancuso, known for hosting parties at "The Loft," attracted a diverse crowd including many gay men of color who reportedly "bellowed out the chorus" when the song was played. It has been described as a prototype for the disco genre. The song was listed at number 92 on Rolling Stone's list of The 100 Greatest Motown Songs.

In 1979, the song was covered by Paul Lewis as a Disco single on the Sunshine Sound label, produced by Harry Wayne Casey, known as the "KC" in KC & the Sunshine Band.

In 1996, the song was covered by American singer D'Angelo for the film Get on the Bus, which was produced by James Mtume. In July 2017, it was featured in the PBS mini-series Disco: Soundtrack of a Revolution, which highlighted the proto-disco era. The song was showcased alongside other influential tracks like "Soul Makossa" by Manu Dibango and "The Love I Lost" by Harold Melvin & the Blue Notes. The song was also featured in the 2019 Netflix television series She's Gotta Have It, directed by Spike Lee.

== Charts ==
Chart (1973)	Peak position
US Billboard Hot 100	87
US Hot R&B/Hip-Hop Songs (Billboard)	13
