= Loveline (Tavares album) =

Studio album by Tavares
- Released: 1981
- Genre: R&B, soul
- Length: 43:34
- Label: Capitol
- Producer: Alan Abrahams

Tavares chronology
Love Uprising (1980)	Loveline (1981)	New Directions (1982)

Loveline is the tenth album by the American soul/R&B group Tavares, produced by Alan Abrahams and released in 1981 on the Capitol label. It is the last album that Tavares recorded for Capitol after a nine-year association which covered their whole recording career to that date. The group moved to RCA for their last two albums.

Loveline is Tavares' second successive album to fail to register on either the pop or the R&B top 100.

The incipit of the song Loveline is very similar to the Alton McClain and Destiny's 1979 hit "It Must Be Love".

== Reception ==
Billboard described the album as a "well-paced collection of driving, mid-tempo rhythm numbers and soft, expressive ballads." The magazine also wrote that their singles capture the dynamics of their previous singles.

== Track listing ==
1. "Keep On" (Kashif, Paul Laurence) - 3:40
2. "Turn Out the Nightlight" (Bunny Hull, Andrew Woolfolk) - 4:45
3. "Better Love" (Charles Fearing, Laythan Armor) - 4:44
4. "God Bless You" (Brenda Russell) - 4:50
5. "Touché" (Laythan Armor, Alan Abrahams, Charles Fearing) - 3:40
6. "Loveline" (Kashif, Paul Laurence) - 4:25
7. "Don't Want to Fool You" (Brenda Russell) - 5:45
8. "House of Music" (Sandy Linzer, Doug James) - 4:25
9. "Right Back in Your Arms Again" (Al Jarreau, Patrick Henderson) - 3:45
10. "Right On Time" (Kashif) - 3:35

== Singles ==
- "Turn Out The Nightlight" (US R&B #45)
- "Loveline" (US R&B #47)
