= Sky High! =

Studio album by Tavares
- Released: May 1976
- Studio: Total Experience Recording Studios (Hollywood, California)
- Genre: R&B, soul, disco
- Length: 39:46
- Label: Capitol
- Producer: Freddie Perren

Tavares chronology
In the City (1975)	Sky High! (1976)	Love Storm (1977)

Professional ratings
Review scores
Source	Rating
AllMusic	4/5 stars
Christgau's Record Guide	B−

Sky High! is the fourth studio album by the American soul/R&B group Tavares, released in 1976 on the Capitol label.

== Commercial performance ==
Sky High! peaked at no. 20 on the R&B albums chart and no. 24 on the Billboard 200. The album features the singles "Heaven Must Be Missing an Angel", reaching no. 3 on the Hot Soul Singles chart and no. 15 on the Billboard Hot 100, and "Don't Take Away the Music", that charted at no. 14 on the Hot Soul Singles chart and no. 34 on the Billboard Hot 100. Both songs reached no. 1 on the Hot Dance Club Play chart. As of 2025, "Heaven Must Be Missing an Angel", has 443.9K videos on popular short-form video content social media app, TikTok.

== Track listing ==
Side one
No.	Title	Writer(s)	Length
1.	"The Mighty Power of Love"	Keni St. Lewis, Freddie Perren	3:58
2.	"Ridin' High"	Feliciano Tavares, Keni St. Lewis	4:05
3.	"To the Other Man"	Luther Ingram, Randall Stewart, Johnny Northern, Johnny Baylor	4:34
4.	"Heaven Must Be Missing an Angel"	Keni St. Lewis, Freddie Perren	6:32

Side two
No.	Title	Writer(s)	Length
5.	"Bein' with You"	Keni St. Lewis, Freddie Perren	3:45
6.	"Wonderful"	Homer Banks, Carl Hampton	4:00
7.	"Guiding Star"	Keni St. Lewis, Freddie Perren	6:34
8.	"Don't Take Away the Music"	Keni St. Lewis, Freddie Perren, Christine Yarian	6:18

== Personnel ==
- James Gadson – drums
- John Barnes – piano
- Scott Edwards – bass
- Bob "Boogie" Bowles, Melvin "Wah Wah" Ragin – guitar
- Bob Zimmitti, Paulinho Magalhaes, Paulinho da Costa, Freddie Perren – percussion
- Electric Ivory Experience (John Barnes, Bob Robitaille) – synthesizers

== Charts ==
Album

Chart (1976)	Peaks
Australia (Kent Music Report)	36
U.S. Billboard Top LPs	24
U.S. Billboard Top Soul LPs	20

Singles

Year	Single	Peaks		
Year	Single	US	US R&B	US Dan
1976	"Heaven Must Be Missing an Angel"	15	3	1
1976	"Don't Take Away the Music"	34	14	1
