= Future Bound =

Studio album by Tavares
- Released: April 1978
- Studio: The Mom & Pops Company Store (Studio City, California)
- Genre: R&B, soul, disco
- Length: 34:20
- Label: Capitol
- Producer: Freddie Perren

Tavares chronology
Love Storm (1977)	Future Bound (1978)	Madam Butterfly (1979)

Professional ratings
Review scores
Source	Rating
AllMusic	3/5 stars

Future Bound is the sixth studio album by American soul/R&B group Tavares, released in 1978 on the Capitol label.

== Commercial performance ==
The album peaked at No. 55 on the R&B albums chart. It also reached No. 115 on the Billboard 200. The album features the singles "More Than a Woman", which peaked at No. 36 on the Hot Soul Singles chart and No. 32 on the Billboard Hot 100, "The Ghost of Love", which peaked at No. 48 on the Hot Soul Singles chart, and "Timber", which reached No. 94 on the Hot Soul Singles chart.

== Track listing ==
Side one
No.	Title	Writer(s)	Length
1.	"The Ghost of Love"	Keni St. Lewis	6:01
2.	"Timber"	Keni St. Lewis	5:17
3.	"We're Both Ready for Love"	Keni St. Lewis, Freddie Perren	3:38
4.	"All I See Is You"	William Scott Harralson, Harvey Scales, Gino Cunico	3:19

Side two
No.	Title	Writer(s)	Length
5.	"Slow Train to Paradise"	Lucy Garber, Dave Callens, Ed Villareal	4:56
6.	"Honey Can I"	Len Ron Hanks, Zane Grey	3:35
7.	"More Than a Woman"	Barry Gibb, Robin Gibb, Maurice Gibb	3:25
8.	"Feels So Good"	Feliciano Tavares	4:17

== Personnel ==
- James Gadson – drums
- Chuck Rainey – bass guitar
- Greg Phillinganes – acoustic piano, Fender Rhodes
- Bob Bowles, Jim Nau – guitar
- Bob Zimmitti – percussion
- Paulinho da Costa – congas
- Freddie Perren – vibraphone, percussion, synthesizer, harpsichord

== Charts ==
Album

Chart (1978)	Peaks
U.S. Billboard Top LPs	115
U.S. Billboard Top Soul LPs	55

Singles

Year	Single	Peaks	
Year	Single	US	US R&B
1977	"More Than a Woman"	32	36
1978	"The Ghost of Love"	—	48
1978	"Timber"	—	94
