= He's a Friend =

Studio album by Eddie Kendricks
- Released: February 1976
- Recorded: 1975–1976
- Studios: Sigma Sound, Philadelphia, Pennsylvania
- Genres: Soul, disco
- Label: Tamla Records
- Producer: Norman Harris

Eddie Kendricks chronology
The Hit Man (1975)	He's a Friend (1976)	Goin' Up In Smoke (1976)

Singles from He's A Friend
- 1. "He's A Friend" Released: January 16, 1976; 2. "Get It While It's Hot" Released: May 18, 1976

He's a Friend is the seventh album by former Temptations vocalist Eddie Kendricks. It was released in February 1976 on the Tamla imprint of Motown Records.

== Reception ==
This album was embraced by the black and gay underground clubs. The lead and album title single, the inspirational "He's a Friend", merged the classic Motown sound with T.S.O.P., the Sound of Philadelphia, courtesy of Norman Harris and several Philly sessions players. That first single was rotated like a #1 record at these clubs. Along with that, "Get it While It's Hot", "I Won't Take No" and even the ballad "Part of Me" was spun when clubs would play one or two downtempo tracks at the close of an evening. This diverse club play made "He's a Friend" an underground club classic.

"He's a Friend" fell one step away from securing another #1 R&B single for Kendricks, stopping at #2 behind "Disco Lady" by Johnnie Taylor. Kendricks had an impressive 9 Top 10 hits (10 if The Temptations reunion single, "Standing on the Top" counted, since the song was recorded when he was a solo artist). Two more singles, like the smash "Girl You Need A Change Of Mind" also made the Top 20.

Professional ratings
Review scores
Source	Rating
Allmusic	4/5 stars

== Track listing ==
1. "He's a Friend" (Allan Felder, Bruce Gray, T.G. Conway) 4:36
2. "A Part of Me" (Allan Felder, Norman Harris, Ron Tyson aka "Tyron Presson") 3:16
3. "I Won't Take No" (Allan Felder, Norman Harris, Ron Tyson aka "Tyron Presson") 2:55
4. "Never Gonna Leave You" (Allan Felder, Bruce Gray, T.G. Conway) 4:08
5. "Get It While It's Hot" (Mike Holden, Theodore Life) 3:09
6. "Chains" (Allan Felder, Bunny Sigler, Norman Harris, Ron Tyson) 3:23
7. "The Sweeter You Treat Her" (Buddy Turner, Jerry Akines, Johnny Bellmon, Victor Drayton) 4:53
8. "It's Not What You Got" (Allan Felder, T.G. Conway) 4:07
9. "On My Way Home" (Buddy Turner, Jerry Akines, Johnny Bellmon, Victor Drayton) 3:49
10. "All of My Love" (Allan Felder, Bruce Gray) 2:46

== Personnel ==
- Eddie Kendricks - lead and backing vocals
- Norman Harris - guitar
- Vincent Montana Jr. - vibraphone
- Bruce Gray - keyboards, backing vocals
- Ron Baker, Michael "Sugar Bear" Foreman - bass
- Charles Collins, Earl "The Pearl" Young - drums
- Bobby Eli, T.J. Tindall - guitar
- T. G. Conway, Carlton Kent, Ron "Have Mercy" Kersey - keyboards
- Larry Washington - congas
- Don Renaldo - horns, strings
- Barbara Ingram, Bruce Hawes, Carl Helm, Carla Benson, Darryl Grant, Evette Benton - backing vocals
- Allan Felder - vocal arrangements, percussion, backing vocals
- Norman Harris, Vincent Montana, Jr., T.G. Conway, Ron "Have Mercy" Tyson - arrangements

== Charts ==
Year	Album	Chart positions	
Year	Album	US	US R&B
1976	He's A Friend	38	3

=== Singles ===
Year	Single	Chart positions		
Year	Single	US	US R&B	US Dance
1976	"Chains"	—	—	3
1976	"Get It While It's Hot"	—	24	3
1976	"He's A Friend"	36	2	15
1976	"It's Not What You Got"	—	—	2
