= Goin' Up in Smoke =

Studio album by Eddie Kendricks
- Released: September 1976
- Recorded: 1976
- Studio: Sigma Sound, Philadelphia, Pennsylvania
- Genre: Soul
- Label: Tamla Records
- Producer: Norman Harris

Eddie Kendricks chronology
He's a Friend (1976)	Goin' Up in Smoke (1976)	Slick (1977)

Singles from Goin' Up in Smoke
- 1. "Goin' Up in Smoke" Released: October 26, 1976; 2. "Born Again" Released: April 21, 1977

Goin' Up in Smoke is the eighth album by former Temptations vocalist Eddie Kendricks. It was released in September 1976 on the Tamla imprint of Motown Records.

Mariah Carey sampled the title track in 2014 on her song "Meteorite".

== Reception ==
Professional ratings
Review scores
Source	Rating
Allmusic	2.5/5 stars

== Track listing ==
1. "Goin' Up in Smoke" (Allan Felder) 4:30
2. "The Newness Is Gone" (Allan Felder) 4:40
3. "Sweet Tenderoni" (Allan Felder) 4:15
4. "Born Again" (Allan Felder) 3:26
5. "Don't You Want Light" (Brian Evans, Donald Harmon, John Faison) 3:47
6. "Music Man" (Jerry Akines, Johnny Bellmon, Reginald Turner, Victor Drayton) 4:43
7. "Thanks for the Memories" (Bruce Gray, Phil Hurtt) 4:56
8. "To You From Me" (Bruce Gray, Frank Snowden, Mike Holden, T.G. Conway) 3:00
9. "Don't Put Off Till Tomorrow" (Allan Felder, Norman Harris) 3:53
10. "Skeleton in Your Closet" (Jerry Akines, Johnny Bellmon, Reginald Turner, Victor Drayton) 2:36

== Personnel ==
- Eddie Kendricks - lead and backing vocals
- Norman Harris - guitar
- Vincent Montana Jr. - vibraphone
- Bruce Gray - keyboards, backing vocals
- Ron Baker, Michael "Sugar Bear" Foreman - bass
- Charles Collins, Earl "The Pearl" Young - drums
- Bobby Eli, T.J. Tindall - guitar
- T. G. Conway, Carlton Kent, Ron "Have Mercy" Kersey - keyboards
- Robert Cupit, Larry Washington - congas
- Allan Felder - percussion
- Don Renaldo - horns, strings
- Allan Felder, Barbara Ingram, Carl Helm, Carla Benson, Evette Benton, Phil Hurtt, Ronald T. Presson - backing vocals

== Charts ==
Year	Album	Chart positions	
Year	Album	US	US R&B
1976	Goin' Up In Smoke	114	22

=== Singles ===
Year	Single	Chart positions		
Year	Single	US	US R&B	US Dance
1977	"Goin' Up In Smoke"	—	30	11
