= Words and Music (Tavares album) =

Studio album by Tavares
- Released: September 1983
- Genre: R&B, soul
- Length: 43:55
- Label: RCA Victor
- Producer: Leon Sylvers III, Dana Meyers, Wardell Potts Jr., Jay Senter, Kenny Nolan, Rick Wyatt Jr.

Tavares chronology
New Directions (1982)	Words and Music (1983)

Words and Music is the twelfth and to date final album by American soul/R&B group Tavares, released by RCA Records in 1983. The album contains a top 10 R&B single in "Deeper in Love". The single, "Words and Music", peaked at #29 on the R&B chart.

== Track listing ==
1. "Ten to One" (Isaias Gamboa, Joey Gallo, Leon Sylvers III) - 6:06
2. "Deeper in Love" (Dana Meyers, Dominick Leslie, Wardell Potts) - 4:52
3. "Caught Short" (Dana Marshall, Dana Meyers, Ronald E. Parker) - 5:06
4. "(You're) My All in All" (Dana Marshall, Dana Meyers, Ralph Edward Clayborn, Ronald E. Parker) - 5:41
5. "Words and Music" (Kenny Nolan) - 4:42
6. "Baby I Want You Back" (Kris Young, Richard Wyatt, Jr.) - 4:43
7. "I Really Miss You Baby" (Kris Young, Richard Wyatt, Jr.) - 4:35
8. "Don't Play So Hard to Get" (Kris Young, Richard Wyatt, Jr.) - 4:00
9. "Us and Love (We Go Together)" (Kenny Nolan) - 4:10

== Singles ==
- "Deeper in Love" (US R&B #10)
- "Words and Music" (US R&B #29)
