= Love Storm =

Studio album by Tavares
- Released: March 1977
- Studio: Total Experience Recording Studios (Hollywood, California); United Western Studios (Hollywood, California)
- Genre: R&B, soul, disco
- Length: 35:44
- Label: Capitol
- Producer: Freddie Perren

Tavares chronology
Sky High! (1976)	Love Storm (1977)	Future Bound (1978)

Professional ratings
Review scores
Source	Rating
AllMusic	3/5 stars
The Virgin Encyclopedia of R&B and Soul	4/5 stars

Love Storm is the fifth studio album by American soul/R&B group Tavares, released in 1977 on the Capitol label.

== Commercial performance ==
The album peaked at No. 15 on the R&B albums chart. It also reached No. 59 on the Billboard 200. The album features the singles "Whodunit", which peaked at No. 1 on the Hot Soul Singles chart and No. 22 on the Billboard Hot 100, and "Goodnight My Love", which reached No. 14 on the Hot Soul Singles chart.

== Track listing ==
All tracks are written by Keni St. Lewis and Freddie Perren, except where noted.

Side one
No.	Title	Writer(s)	Length
1.	"Whodunit"		3:35
2.	"Keep in Touch"		3:47
3.	"I Wanna See You Soon"		3:49
4.	"Fool of the Year"	Feliciano Tavares, Keni St. Lewis	3:20
5.	"Watchin' the Woman's Movement"		4:03

Side two
No.	Title	Writer(s)	Length
6.	"One Step Away"		4:14
7.	"Out of the Picture"		3:38
8.	"The Going Ups & The Coming Downs"	Jim Weatherly	3:41
9.	"Goodnight My Love"	George Motola, John Marascalco	5:37

== Personnel ==
- James Gadson – drums
- John Barnes, Sonny Burke, Freddie Perren – keyboards
- Scott Edwards – bass
- Bob "Boogie" Bowles – guitar
- Paulinho da Costa – congas
- Bob Zimmitti, Freddie Perren – percussion
- Freda Payne – special guest vocals on "I Wanna See You Soon"

== Charts ==
Album

Chart (1975)	Peaks
Australia (Kent Music Report)	99
U.S. Billboard Top LPs	59
U.S. Billboard Top Soul LPs	15

Singles

Year	Single	Peaks	
Year	Single	US	US R&B
1977	"Whodunit"	22	1
1977	"Goodnight My Love"	—	14
