= Don't Take Away the Music =

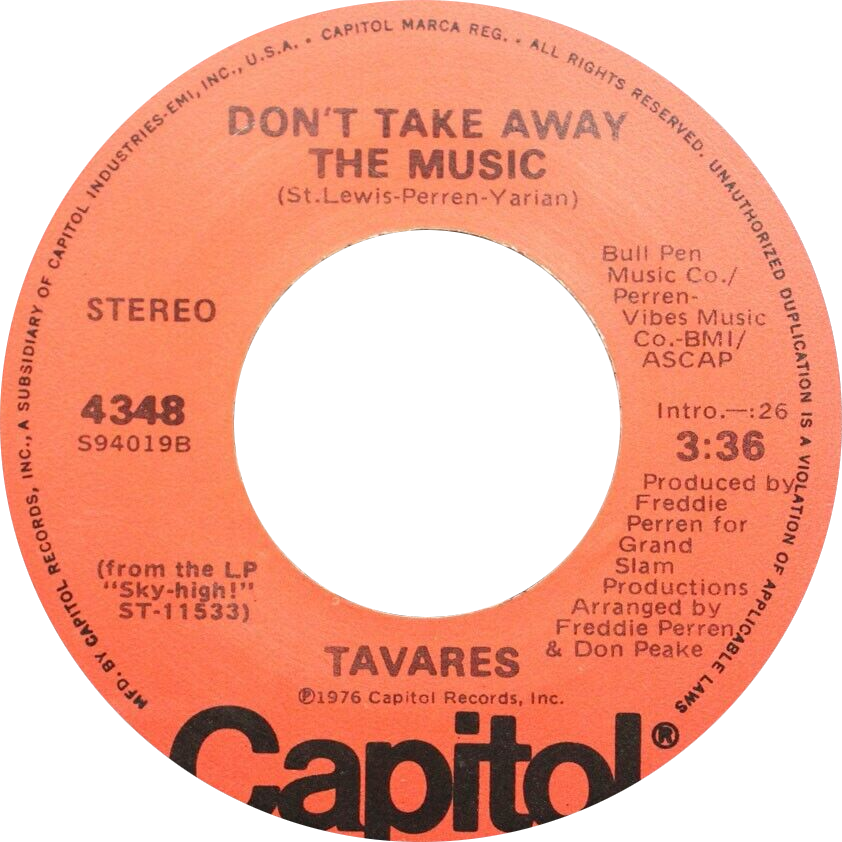
- Side A of the US single

Single by Tavares

from the album Sky High!
- B-side: "Guiding Star"
- Released: October 1976
- Recorded: 1976
- Genre: Pop, R&B, dance, disco
- Length: 6:18 (album version); 3:36 (single version)
- Label: Capitol
- Songwriters: Keni St. Lewis; Freddie Perren; Christine Yarian
- Producer: Freddie Perren

Tavares singles chronology
"Heaven Must Be Missing an Angel" (1976)	"Don't Take Away the Music" (1976)	"Whodunit" (1977)

"Don't Take Away the Music" is a hit song by R&B/disco group Tavares, released in the fall of 1976. It peaked at number 34 on the US Billboard Hot 100 singles chart and at number four in the UK. Along with the track "Heaven Must Be Missing an Angel", the song spent two weeks at number 1 on the Hot Dance Club Play chart.

== Chart performance ==
=== Weekly charts ===
Chart (1976–77)	Peak position
Canadian RPM	48
Ireland	7
Netherlands	5
UK	4
US Billboard Hot 100	34
US Dance/Disco	1
US R&B	14
US Cash Box Top 100	40
