= Shoeshine =

Shoeshine may refer to:

- Shoeshine (film) (Sciuscià), a 1946 film directed by Vittorio De Sica
- Shoe polish
- Shoeshiner
- Shoeshine boy (disambiguation)
- In boxing, shoeshining is the term often given to a rapid series of uppercuts
- "Shoeshine", an episode of the television series Teletubbies

== See also ==
- Boot Polish (film), a 1954 Indian film
