= Boogie Down =

1973 song by Eddie Kendricks

Single by Eddie Kendricks

from the album Boogie Down!
- B-side: "Can't Help What I Am"
- Released: December 1973
- Recorded: 1973
- Genre: Disco, funk, R&B
- Length: 3:48 (single edit); 7:02 (album version)
- Label: Tamla Motown; T 54243
- Songwriters: Leonard Caston Jr. Anita Poree; Frank Wilson
- Producers: Frank Wilson & Leonard Caston, Jr.

Eddie Kendricks singles chronology
"Keep On Truckin'" (1973)	"Boogie Down" (1973)	"One Tear" (1974)

Official audio
- "Boogie Down" on YouTube

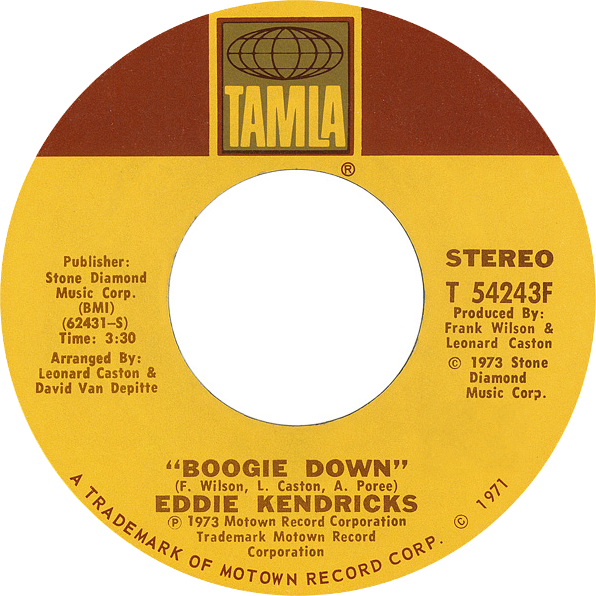

"Boogie Down" is a 1973 song which was recorded by Eddie Kendricks for Tamla Motown label. The song was co-written by Leonard Caston Jr., Anita Poree and Frank Wilson, the same songwriting team that had composed "Keep On Truckin'", Kendricks' first major hit as a solo artist. Caston and Wilson co-produced the song and the arrangement was handled by Caston, Wilson and David Van De Pitte.

== Chart performance ==
Like "Keep on Truckin'", "Boogie Down" is an up-tempo, disco, dance number that saw heavy rotation in dance clubs. Released as a single from the album of the same name, "Boogie Down" became Kendricks' second consecutive single to top the Billboard's R&B Singles Chart, holding the number one position for three weeks.

It just missed becoming his second straight #1 on the Billboard Pop Singles Chart, peaking at number two for two straight weeks, behind "Seasons in the Sun" by Terry Jacks. However, it was Kendricks' second #1 single on the Cash Box Top 100 chart. Billboard ranked it as the #30 Pop single of 1974. Outside the US, it was a Top 40 hit in Britain as well, hitting #39 on the UK Charts.

== Personnel ==
Credits adapted from The Billboard Book of Number One Rhythm & Blues Hits.

- Eddie Kendricks – vocals
- Ed Greene – drums
- Dean Parks – guitar
- Greg Poree – guitar
- King Errisson – congas
- James Jamerson – bass
- Jerry Peters – organ
- Leonard Caston Jr. – piano, clavinet, writer, producer
- Anita Poree – writer
- Frank Wilson – writer, producer

== Other charting versions ==
Van McCoy & the Soul City Symphony recorded a version of the song which was released on Avco 4868 in 1974. It was backed with "A Rainy Night in Georgia". It made it to no. 67 on the US R&B Charts that year.
