= Shoeshine Boy =

Single by Eddie Kendricks

from the album For You
- B-side: "Hooked on Your Love"
- Released: 1975
- Genre: Rhythm and blues
- Length: 3:14
- Label: Tamla
- Songwriters: Harry Booker, Linda Allen
- Producers: Frank Wilson, Leonard Caston

Eddie Kendricks singles chronology
"One Tear" (1974)	"Shoeshine Boy" (1975)	"Get the Cream Off the Top" (1975)

"Shoeshine Boy" is a 1975 R&B/pop single by Eddie Kendricks. Co-writers Linda Allen and Harry Booker sang background vocals. The single was the last of Kendricks' three number-one U.S. R&B hits and one of his final crossover singles, peaking at #18 on the Billboard Hot 100.
