= Unbreakable (Alicia Keys song) =

Single by Alicia Keys

from the album Unplugged
- Released: September 6, 2005
- Recorded: July 14, 2005
- Venue: Brooklyn Academy of Music (New York)
- Genre: R&B
- Length: 4:34
- Label: J
- Songwriters: Alicia Keys; Kanye West; Harold Lilly; Garry Glenn
- Producers: Alex Coletti; West (uncredited)

Alicia Keys singles chronology
"Karma" (2004)	"Unbreakable" (2005)	"Don't Give Up (Africa)" (2005)

Music video
- "Unbreakable" on YouTube

Music video
- "Unbreakable (Live)" on YouTube

"Unbreakable" is a song by American R&B-soul singer Alicia Keys, released by J Records on September 6, 2005 as the lead single from her live album, Unplugged (2005). Written by Keys, Kanye West, and Harold Lilly, the track features a Wurlitzer riff, and is built around a sample of Eddie Kendricks' 1977 song "Intimate Friends", written by Garry Glenn. Due to its inclusion on a live album, album producer Alex Coletti is credited with the song's production, although the beat composition was helmed by West.

Lyrically, the song finds Keys comparing herself and her suitor to various celebrity couples, namely Ike and Tina Turner, Bill and Camille Cosby, Oprah Winfrey and Stedman Graham, Florida and James Evans, Will and Jada Pinkett Smith, Kimora Lee and Russell Simmons, and Joe and Katherine Jackson, as well as The Jackson 5. Written in 2003, it was to be included on The Diary of Alicia Keys, but was omitted in favor of "Diary", and nearly missed the album of which it was included. She said, "The song was always one of my favorites, but I did not think it would fit well into my second album".

"Unbreakable" peaked at number 34 on the U.S. Billboard Hot 100, becoming Keys' first single to miss the top 20 since 2002's "How Come You Don't Call Me". However, it found success on the Hot R&B/Hip-Hop Songs chart, where it peaked at number four. The song received nominations for Best Female R&B Vocal Performance and Best R&B Song at the 48th Grammy Awards, but lost both to "We Belong Together" by Mariah Carey. It also won two NAACP Image Award, for Outstanding Song and Outstanding Music Video.

== Critical reception ==
Jon Pareles of The New York Times wrote that the song "doesn't aim for timelessness" as "it's as full of topical references as a hip-hop song".

== Music video ==
Two music videos were produced for the song:

- Unplugged Version, directed by Alex Coletti
- BET Version, directed by Justin Francis

== Track listings ==
- US 12" single

A. "Unbreakable" (Radio Mix) – 4:14
B. "Unbreakable" (Radio Mix) – 4:14

- US promotional CD single
1. "Unbreakable" (Radio Edit) – 4:14
2. "Unbreakable" (Call Out Hook) – 0:10
3. "Unbreakable" (Radio Edit) (MP3 format) – 4:14
- US promotional DVD single
1. "Unbreakable" (BET Video)

== Charts ==
=== Weekly charts ===
Chart (2005–2006)	Peak position
Netherlands (Dutch Top 40 Tipparade)	5
US Billboard Hot 100	34
US Adult R&B Songs (Billboard)	1
US Hot R&B/Hip-Hop Songs (Billboard)	4
US Pop 100 (Billboard)	60

=== Year-end charts ===
Chart (2005)	Position
US Hot R&B/Hip-Hop Songs (Billboard)	63
Chart (2006)	Position
US Hot R&B/Hip-Hop Songs (Billboard)	38

== Release history ==
Release dates and formats
Region	Date	Format(s)	Label(s)	Ref.
United States	September 6, 2005	Urban contemporary radio	J	
United States	October 11, 2005	12-inch vinyl	J	
