= Benjamin Wright (composer) =

American producer and composer (born 1946)

Benjamin Wright Jr.
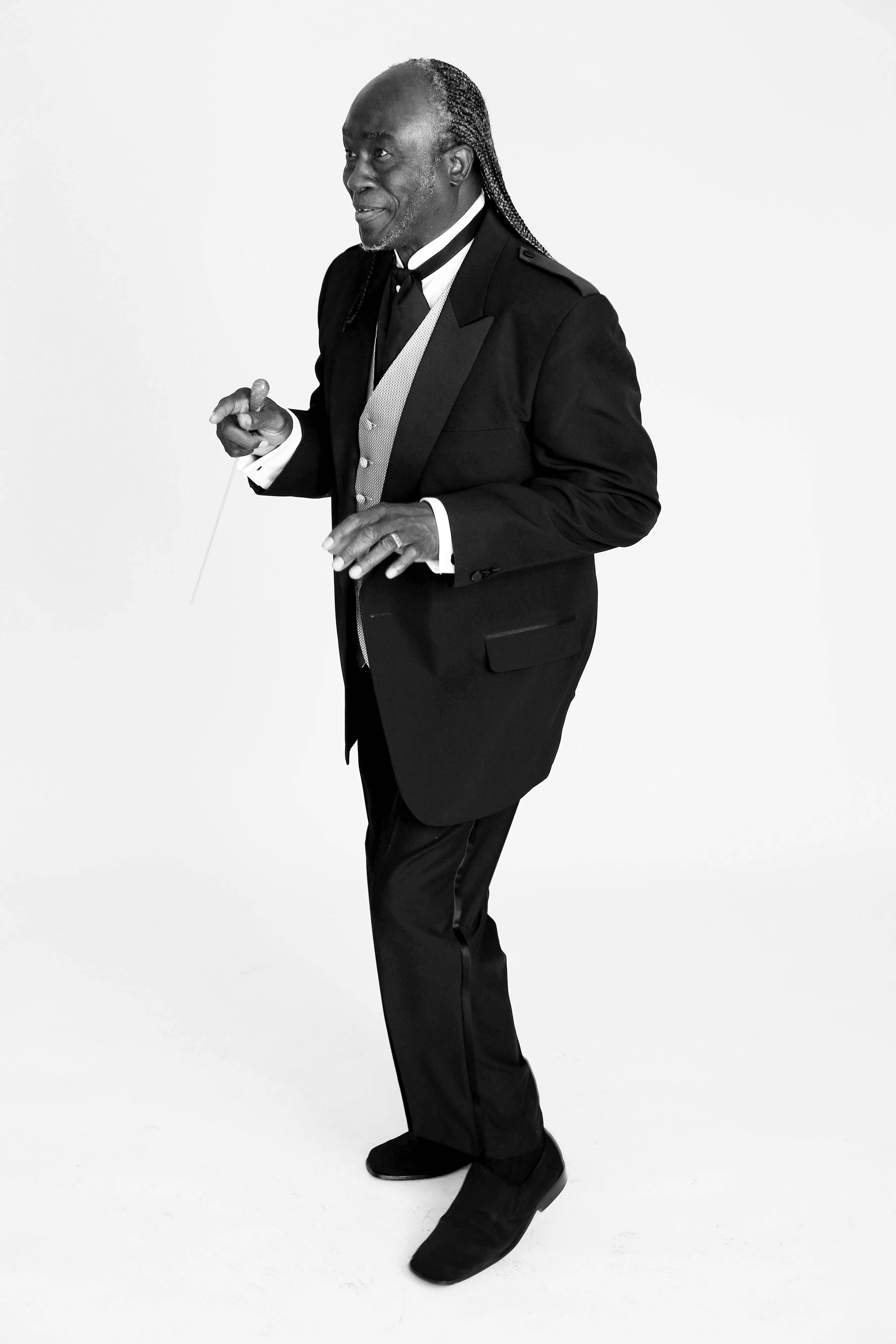
- Born: July 11, 1946 (age 79); Greenville, Mississippi, U.S.
- Occupations: Musical composer, arranger
- Website: MrBenjaminWright.com

Benjamin F. Wright Jr. (born July 11, 1946) is an American record producer, composer and arranger.

As an arranger, he has conducted hits for many artists including Justin Timberlake, OutKast, Brandy, Destiny's Child, Dru Hill, Aretha Franklin, Frank Ocean, Quincy Jones, James Ingram, Richard Ashcroft, Janet Jackson and Michael Jackson.

== Early life ==
He was born in Greenville, Mississippi, United States. Wright started his music career while in high school, performing as a drum major in the marching band, and singing doo-wop in a group he and his friends started. After high school, Wright embarked on his first musical tour with the R&B singer, Ted Taylor. During the tour, Wright played piano and sang backup for the band. The Ted Taylor tour allowed Wright to experience music arrangement for the first time. His subsequent success within the industry took him on the road with musicians including James Brown, Otis Redding, Billy Stewart and Gladys Knight & the Pips.

Shortly after Wright's touring period, he was drafted into the United States Air Force. While there, Wright met Andrew "Fats" Ford, a trumpet player who played with Duke Ellington. Ford eventually introduced Wright to Ellington — an experience that changed Wright's life. After Wright's honorable discharge from the military in Alabama, he worked for several years with Bobby Moore & the Rhythm Aces.

Wright was soon invited to play with Pieces of Peace in Chicago. He relocated and begin a career as a copyist and arranged. During this time, he attended the Chicago Conservatory of Music and received a PhD from the Pentecostal Bible College in Tuskegee, Alabama.

== Chicago era ==
After meeting up with the Pieces of Peace, he was brought on as a member of Chicago's premier soul and funk bands. Through the 1960s and early 1970s they backed Syl Johnson for his shows and on his 1970 LP. Is It Because I'm Black. Pieces of Peace was one of the premier session bands and recorded music for Jackie Wilson, The Chi-Lites, Jerry Butler, and Curtis Mayfield and The Impressions. Concurrently, he was a copyist for arranging and producer for Charles Stepney, Donny Hathaway, Gene Barge, and Richard Evans – exposing him to wide range of artists and building a strong relationship with Chess Records, Brunswick Records, Curtom Records, Mercury Records, and various artists across the Chicago music scene. Eventually Pieces of Peace disintegrated during a tour of Southeast Asia, mostly due to homesickness and pressure over managerial disputes, amongst other factors.

== Los Angeles era ==
With the band disbanding and the industry shifting from Chicago to Los Angeles, Wright moved to the latter to expand into producing music. Once there in 1975, he started working as the music director and producer for The Temptations—being instrumental in their move from Motown Records to Atlantic Records. He wrote a number of songs on their 1976 album The Temptations Do The Temptations. On this album the group enjoyed the greatest creative control of their career. He would also co-write on subsequent albums for the band for years to come.

He also became the musical director for Gladys Knight & The Pips, Aretha Franklin, and Barry White & The Love Unlimited Orchestra.

Wright, also began work with Stax Records gospel crossover artist, Rance Allen in 1978, arranging and orchestrating his Top 30 R&B hit, "I Belong to You." Achieving mainstream chart success was a rare occurrence for a gospel act. The two continued to collaborate for a number of years.

In 1979, Wright was contacted by Quincy Jones who requested that Wright work on Michael Jackson's album Off the Wall. Wright went on to arrange the strings for "Rock with You", "Get on the Floor", and the Grammy Award winning song "Don't Stop 'Til You Get Enough". Wright received another Grammy that year for the Instrumental Performance on Earth, Wind, & Fire's hit, "Boogie Wonderland".

He had continued chart success in 1980 producing for Tavares' Supercharged and Love Uprising, with the songs "Love Uprising" and the socio-politically charged "Bad Times". He also arranged the horns and strings for Aretha Franklin's 1980 hit "United Together", subsequently joining Franklin on tour as her music director.

Wright and Jones collaborated again in 1981. "One Hundred Ways" performed by James Ingram, and written by Wright, Tony Coleman, and Kathy Wakefield, won a Grammy Award for Best R&B Vocal Performance.

Between 1982 and 1983, Wright opened the Ritesonian recording studio.

After having worked on Edmund Sylvers' solo project, Leon Sylvers III (the in-house producer for SOLAR Records) reached out to Wright to arrange music for a number of the label's musicians including Klymaxx, The Whispers ["Keep On Lovin Me" (US R&B number 4) and "In The Raw" (US R&B number 8)], Lakeside ["Real Love" (US R&B number 17)], Shalamar, Midnight Star, Carrie Lucas ["Dance With You" (US Dance number 6)], and Dynasty.

Similarly, he would arrange a number of records for DeBarge on their All This Love and In a Special Way albums. "All This Love" (1982) reached number 5 on the Billboard R&B chart, and number 17 on the Billboard Hot 100, helping its parent album of the same name reach gold status by mid 1983. "Love Me in a Special Way" also connected with the R&B community reaching U.S. Billboard Hot Black Singles peak of number 11. On that same album, Wright arranged "A Dream". The song has been sampled by several artists including 2Pac and Blackstreet.

His run continued in the 1990s and early 2000s working with Tony! Toni! Toné! "Slow Wine" (US R&B number 21), Chaka Khan "Never Miss The Water" (US Dance number one), the debut album for Destiny's Child, Brandy's album Full Moon, Toni Braxton's "Maybe," Dru Hill's "I Love You," DJ Quik's Balance & Options (US R&B number 5), Mary Mary "In The Morning" (US Gospel number one), Jamiroquai's album Dynamite (UK Albums Chart number 3), Joss Stone's album Introducing Joss Stone (US Billboard 200, number 2).

In 2004, Wright received a Grammy Award for Album of the Year as part of his contributions to OutKast's album, Speakerboxxx/The Love Below. Similarly, he receive another Grammy for Best Pop Vocal Album for his work on Justin Timberlake's, Justified. 2004 would also mark his first trip to conduct the Norwegian Radio Symphony at the Nobel Peace Prize Concert in Oslo, Norway. He returned in 2005, to conduct Gladys Knight's performance.

The relationship with Timberlake continued through subsequent albums, conducting the string arrangements on a number of songs, including "Until The End of Time", "Mirrors", and "Take Back The Night".

Wright subsequently worked with Mystery Skulls in 2014, contributing to a number of songs to his debut album, Forever. In 2016, Wright worked with Mary J. Blige, Ty Dolla $ign, and Frank Ocean.
