= Keep On Truckin' (song) =

"Keep On Truckin', Pt. 1"

Single by Eddie Kendricks

from the album Eddie Kendricks
- B-side: "Keep On Truckin', Pt. 2"
- Released: August 1973
- Recorded: 1973
- Studio: Motown studios in Los Angeles with Crystal Sound Recording Players
- Genre: Funk; disco; R&B; psychedelic soul
- Length: 3:21 (single edit); 8:00 (album version)
- Label: Tamla Motown (T 54238)
- Songwriters: Leonard Caston Jr.; Anita Poree; Frank Wilson
- Producers: Leonard Caston Jr.; Frank Wilson

Eddie Kendricks singles chronology
"Girl You Need a Change of Mind (Pt. 1)" (1972)	"Keep On Truckin', Pt. 1" (1973)	"Boogie Down" (1973)

Official audio
- "Keep On Truckin'" on YouTube

"Keep On Truckin'" is a 1973 hit song recorded by Eddie Kendricks for Tamla Motown label. The song was Kendricks's first major hit as a solo artist, coming two years after his departure from the Temptations. "Keep On Truckin'" reached number one on both the Billboard Hot 100 and R&B Singles Chart upon its release, and was Kendricks' only number-one solo hit. It also reached #18 on the UK Charts.

== Background ==
By 1973 Eddie Kendricks was two years into a solo career following his bitter split from the Temptations. While his former bandmates went on to record hits such as "Superstar (Remember How You Got Where You Are)" (which was a reported jab at Kendricks and fellow ex-Temptation David Ruffin), and their seven-minute opus, "Papa Was a Rollin' Stone", Kendricks had begun to reach a cult R&B fan base following his most recent two albums.

Working closely with Frank Wilson, who was the main producer in most of Kendricks' solo efforts, the duo worked on a song that would aim at the dance floor rather than the serene ballads that Kendricks was used to recording. His earlier single, "Girl You Need a Change of Mind", was a cult favorite for club fans. With co-writers Anita Poree (1939–2018) and Leonard Caston Jr., Wilson created a song rivaling that of the Temptations' Norman Whitfield-produced cinematic soul that had become commonplace among the group's recordings, but instead of instigating drama, the song's grooves were clearly aimed at the dance floor.

Upon its release in the August 1973, the song would finally bring Kendricks out of the shadow of his former band as the song's catchy beats and melody became a crossover hit. By late fall, the song had reached number one on the US pop and R&B singles chart, matching the performance of the biggest singles released by his former group. When "...Truckin'" became a hit, the Temptations' hit luster was waning, with "Hey Girl (I Like Your Style)" barely reaching the Top 40, and the follow-up funk song, "Let Your Hair Down", becoming only a modest hit (although an R&B #1). Much like their "Superstar", which would notably be covered by David Ruffin, Kendricks included a jab at his former bandmates with the lyric:

In old Temptations' rain, I'm duckin'
For your love through sleet or snow, I'm truckin'

In the single version, a hollow sound of a truck rolling down a highway is heard, which separates the two parts of the song, which is not heard in the album version. In the song outro of the song, the drummer repeatedly hits the cymbals on every fourth beat before the song's fade.

In 2020, Reverb.com published a description of the song as "the clavinet workout... the clavinet song of all time." However, the album liner notes do not name a clavinet player at all, simply listing two piano and organ players used on various album tracks: Leonard Caston and Harold Johnson. In 1993, Billboard Books listed the session players for the song, assigning Caston to piano and adding Jerry Peters on organ as well as Gary Coleman on vibes. No clavinet was listed. (Note: Andrew D. Gordon, in his 2020 book 100 Ultimate Soul, Funk and Rock Clavinet Riffs, credits Caston.)

== Charts ==
Weekly chart performance for "Keep On Truckin'"
Chart (1973)	Peak position
UK Singles Chart	18
US Billboard Hot 100	1
US Billboard Hot Soul Singles	1

== Personnel ==
Credits adapted from The Billboard Book of Number One Rhythm & Blues Hits.

- Eddie Kendricks – vocals
- Leonard Caston – piano, writer, producer
- James Jamerson – bass
- Ed Greene – drums
- King Errisson – congas
- Dean Parks – guitar
- Greg Poree – guitar
- Jerry Peters – organ
- Anita Poree – writer
- Frank Wilson – writer, producer
