= Whodunit (song) =

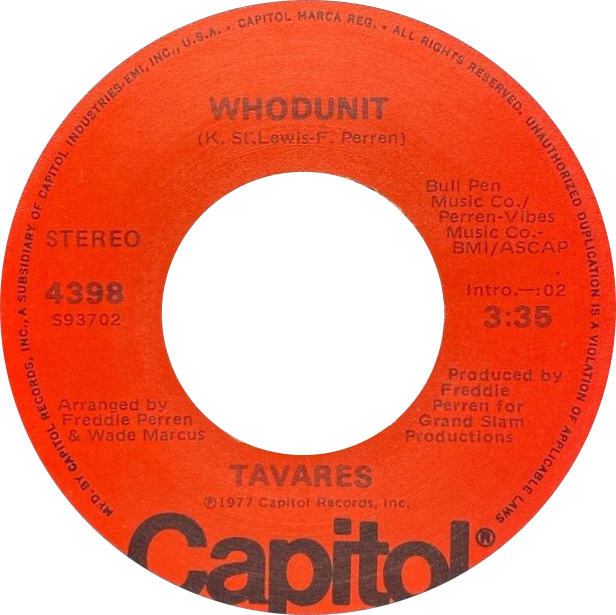
- Side A of the US single

Single by Tavares

from the album Love Storm
- B-side: "Fool of the Year"
- Released: March 1977
- Recorded: 1977
- Genre: Pop, Soul
- Label: Capitol
- Songwriters: Freddie Perren; Keni St. Lewis
- Producer: Freddie Perren

Tavares singles chronology
"Don't Take Away the Music" (1976)	"Whodunit" (1977)	"More Than a Woman" (1978)

"Whodunit", written by Keni St. Lewis and Freddie Perren, was a hit song for American R&B/disco group Tavares in 1977, released from their album Love Storm.

== Background ==
The lyrical hook to the song was the repeated query "Whodunit? / Who stole my baby?" The singer then appealed to a series of famous fictional detectives to help "solve" the case, including Sherlock Holmes, Charlie Chan, Ellery Queen, McCloud, Kojak, Baretta and Dirty Harry. The gimmick was reminiscent of "Searchin'", a 1957 single by The Coasters which also invoked a series of lawmen to track down a missing love interest.

== Chart performance ==
The song spent one week at number one on the R&B singles chart in May 1977 and peaked at number twenty-two on the Billboard Hot 100 singles chart and in the UK peaked at number 5 the week ending 7 May 1977, where it stayed for 2 weeks.

=== Weekly singles charts ===
Chart (1977)	Peak position
Australia (Kent Music Report)	32
Canadian RPM Top 100	15
Netherlands	7
New Zealand	3
US Billboard Hot 100	22
US Billboard R&B	1
US Billboard Adult Contemporary	31
US Cash Box Top 100	16
UK Singles Chart	5

=== Year-end charts ===
Chart (1977)	Position
Canada	136
Netherlands	78
UK	64
US Billboard Hot 100	141
