= Tavares (group) =

American rhythm and blues group

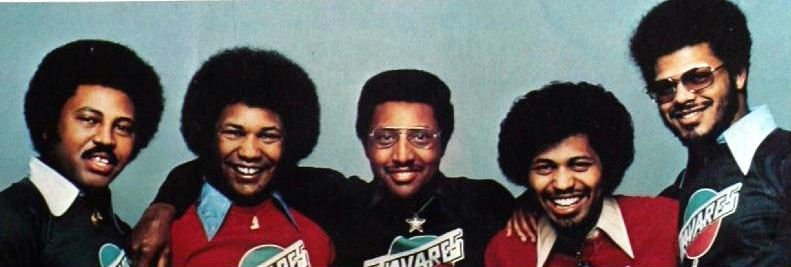
- Tavares in 1977. Left to right: Pooch, Ralph, Chubby, Butch and Tiny

Background information
- Also known as: Chubby and the Turnpikes, The Tavares Brothers
- Origin: New Bedford, Massachusetts and Providence, Rhode Island, U.S.
- Genres: Pop, R&B, soul, funk, disco
- Years active: 1973–present
- Labels: Capitol Records, EMI, RCA
- Members: Perry Lee "Tiny" Tavares; Feliciano Vierra "Butch" Tavares Jr.
- Past members: Ralph Vierra Tavares; Victor Earl Tavares; Arthur Paul "Pooch" Tavares; Antone Laurence "Chubby" Tavares
- Website: tavares-brothers.com

Tavares (also known as The Tavares Brothers) is an American R&B and soul music group composed of five Cape Verdean-American brothers. Some were born in New Bedford, Massachusetts, and Providence, Rhode Island, and they would move back and forth between the two cities throughout their childhood. They are best known for their hits "It Only Takes a Minute" in 1975, and "Heaven Must Be Missing an Angel" in 1976.

Tavares was inducted into the Atlantic City Walk of Fame at Brighton Park on April 27, 2026.

== History ==
The brothers, whose parents were of Cape Verdean descent, started performing in 1959 as The Del Rios. The Del Rios featured John, Ralph, Arthur "Pooch" and Antone "Chubby" Tavares, as well as their cousin, Peter "Boo" Nicholaus. They would sometimes back local singer, Linda Steele. In 1962, they were discovered by producer Juggy Murray who sent them to New York and recorded a single for Crackerjack records, "Come On, Let Me Try / I Don’t Want To Be Loved", which flopped. After the release of the single, the group slowly fell apart, as Linda left the music scene, Boo left to pursue a solo career, and Arthur was drafted into the army, and Pooch and Chubby moved to Connecticut.

Shortly after, Pooch and Chubby formed Chubby and The Realities with younger brother Feliciano "Butch" Tavares. They started out performing at high schools and youth clubs as all three of them hadn't yet turned eighteen. While Ralph was still in the army, he would spend weekends travelling to The 20 Grand nightclub, where he saw then unknown acts like Four Tops, The Countours and The Marvelettes performing, and realised that his brothers couldn't not do anything these groups were doing, so when he was discharged in 1964, he tracked down the three performing, and after seeing them perform for limited pay, Ralph agreed to rejoin them and help seek a major label.

By around 1967, they were Chubby and The Turnpikes, and soon after, met the band The Preachers at Basin Street in New Orleans, where the Turnpikes were opening for The O'Jays. The Preachers included saxophonist Quinn Harris, drummer Jim Atkins, and keyboardist Bernie Worrell. The Preachers then became a backing band for the Turnpikes. Chubby and The Turnpikes signed with Capitol Records in 1967 and had a couple of local hit records including "I Know the Inside Story" in 1967 and "Nothing But Promises" in 1968.

Future Aerosmith drummer Joey Kramer appeared as the drummer with the group in a later incarnation called simply The Turnpikes from the fall of 1969 until September 1970, when he was invited to join Steven Tyler's band. He was later replaced with drummer Paul Klodner and bassist Steve Strout, which gave them a tight, punchy rhythm section.

In 1969, the band gained two more Tavares brothers, Victor and Perry "Tiny" Tavares.

By 1973, they had changed their name to Tavares and scored their first R&B top 10 (Pop top 40) hit with "Check It Out", and soon began charting regularly on the R&B and pop charts. Their first album was also the only that included brother Victor, who sang lead on "Check It Out", but dropped out of the group shortly afterward. In 1974, Tavares had their first No. 1 R&B hit with Hall & Oates's "She's Gone".

"Anonymous vocally, the creatures of various cheerfully crass producers, these five brothers are professional entertainers without apology."

— Christgau's Record Guide: Rock Albums of the Seventies (1981)

1975 turned out to be their most successful year chartwise, with a Top 40 Pop album (In the City), the No. 25 hit "Remember What I Told You to Forget", and their biggest hit, the Top 10 Pop/No. 1 R&B smash "It Only Takes a Minute", which was later successfully covered by both Jonathan King and Take That, and sampled by Jennifer Lopez. They parlayed this success into a spot as an opening act for The Jackson 5. KC and The Sunshine Band was also on this tour. "Minute" was followed by a string of hits: "Heaven Must Be Missing an Angel", "Don't Take Away the Music" (both 1976), and "Whodunit" (1977, another No. 1 R&B hit). In 1977 they also recorded "I Wanna See You Soon", a duet with Capitol labelmate Freda Payne, which received airplay on BBC Radio 1 but failed to chart.

Many of their hits, however, underplayed their R&B background and gave the group the image of being a disco act. This perception was reinforced by their appearance on the soundtrack to the film Saturday Night Fever in 1977. Tavares recorded the Bee Gees song "More Than a Woman", and their version reached the Pop Top 40 that year. The soundtrack became one of the most successful in history, giving Tavares their only Grammy Award.

Later albums, such as Madam Butterfly and Supercharged, strayed from the disco format (although they continued to have Top 10 R&B hits such as "Never Had a Love Like This Before", and the popular sociopolitical "Bad Times", written by British singer-songwriter Gerard McMahon). At the start of the 1980s, Tavares left Capitol Records, signing with RCA Records. They had one last major hit, the ballad "A Penny for Your Thoughts", for which they were nominated for a Grammy in 1982; their last major release was Words and Music in 1983.

In 1984, Ralph stepped down from the group. Pooch took over as the non-commissioned business/booking agent for Tavares from 1984 to 2014. Tiny left in 1988 to pursue his solo career, while the other three brothers continued to tour. Tiny rejoined the group in 2009. Musician Feliciano "Flash" Vierra Tavares, the family patriarch and father of all members of Tavares, died in 2008.

Chubby Tavares released his first solo album, Jealousy, on July 17, 2012, a few months after Tavares, the Four Tops (who recorded the original version of "Remember What I Told You to Forget"), and The Temptations toured the UK together. Preceding the album, a digital-only single was released called "It's Christmas". On December 17, it reached No. 5 on Amazon's Acid Jazz chart. Both the album and the single were produced by Carla Olson, and the album was released by "Fuel Records"/Universal Records.

In 2013, the brothers were honored with "Lifetime Achievement Awards" by The National R&B Music Society Black Tie Gala, in Atlantic City, New Jersey. All six brothers attended and performed on stage together for the first time in 37 years.

In 2014, Pooch suffered a stroke and the business/booking for Tavares was turned over to Oriola Mngmt LLC. He regained his health and opted for retirement.

Ralph Tavares died on December 8, 2021, two days before his 80th birthday.

Chubby retired from singing due to a pulmonary illness on May 14, 2023.

Pooch Tavares died on April 15, 2024, at the age of 81.

On November 29, 2025, Chubby Tavares died at the age of 81.

On April 27, 2026, Tavares was inducted into the Atlantic City Walk of Fame presented by, The National R&B Music Society. Stuart Bascombe of Black Ivory inducted them. Sister Sledge, Melba Moore, Billy Paul, Roy Ayers and Black Ivory were also inducted as part of the 2026 Class.

== Band members ==
The five brothers who sung in the core lineup of Tavares were:

- Ralph Edward Vierra Tavares (December 10, 1941 – December 8, 2021)
- Pooch – Arthur Paul Tavares (November 12, 1942 – April 15, 2024)
- Chubby – Antone Lee Tavares (June 2, 1944 – November 29, 2025)
- Butch – Feliciano Vierra Tavares Jr. (born May 18, 1947)
- Tiny – Perry Lee Tavares (born October 23, 1949)

The Del Rios (1959–1962)

- John Tavares
- Ralph Tavares
- Arthur "Pooch" Tavares
- Antone "Chubby" Tavares
- Peter "Boo" Nicholaus

Chubby & The Realities (1962–1967)

- Antone "Chubby" Tavares (1962–1967)
- Arthur "Pooch" Tavares (1962–1967)
- Feliciano "Butch" Tavares (1962–1967)
- Ralph Tavares (1964–1967)

Chubby & The Turnpikes (1967–1969) / The Turnpikes (1969–1973)

- Antone "Chubby" Tavares (1967–1973)
- Arthur "Pooch" Tavares (1967–1973)
- Feliciano "Butch" Tavares (1967–1973)
- Ralph Tavares (1967–1973)
- Victor Tavares (1969–1973)
- Perry "Tiny" Tavares (1969–1973)

Tavares (1973–present)

- Antone "Chubby" Tavares (1973–2023)
- Arthur "Pooch" Tavares (1973–2014)
- Feliciano "Butch" Tavares (1973–present)
- Ralph Tavares (1973–1984, 2013)
- Victor Tavares (1973–1974, 2013)
- Perry "Tiny" Tavares (1973–1988, 2009–present)

== Discography ==
=== Studio albums ===
Year	Album	Peak chart positions						Record Label
Year	Album	US	US R&B	AUS	CAN	NLD	UK	Record Label
1974	Check It Out	160	20	—	—	—	—	Capitol
1974	Hard Core Poetry	121	11	—	—	—	—	Capitol
1975	In the City	26	8	—	93	—	—	Capitol
1976	Sky High!	24	20	36	7	2	22	Capitol
1977	Love Storm	59	15	99	67	—	—	Capitol
1978	Future Bound	115	55	—	—	—	—	Capitol
1979	Madam Butterfly	92	13	—	90	—	—	Capitol
1980	Supercharged	75	20	—	—	—	—	Capitol
1980	Love Uprising	205	—	—	—	—	—	Capitol
1981	Loveline	—	—	—	—	—	—	Capitol
1982	New Directions	137	30	—	—	—	—	RCA
1983	Words and Music	208	48	—	—	—	—	RCA
"—" denotes a recording that did not chart or was not released in that territory.

=== Compilation albums ===
Year	Album	Peak chart positions				Certifications	Record Label
Year	Album	US	US R&B	NLD	UK	Certifications	Record Label
1977	The Best of Tavares	72	42	—	39	BPI: Silver	Capitol
1993	Capitol Gold: The Best of Tavares	—	—	28	—		Capitol
1996	The Greatest Hits	—	—	—	—		EMI
1997	It Only Takes a Minute: A Lifetime with Tavares	—	—	—	—		EMI
2001	The Best of Tavares	—	—	—	—		EMI-Capitol
2002	Classic Masters	—	—	—	—		Capitol
2004	Anthology	—	—	—	—		Capitol
"—" denotes a recording that did not chart or was not released in that territory.

=== Singles ===
Year	Single	Peak chart positions										Certifications	Album
Year	Single	US	US R&B	US Dan	US A/C	AUS	CAN	IRE	NLD	NZ	UK	Certifications	Album
1973	"Check It Out"	35	5	—	—	—	—	—	—	—	—		Check It Out
1974	"That's the Sound That Lonely Makes"	70	10	—	—	—	—	—	—	—	—		Check It Out
1974	"Too Late"	59	10	—	—	—	67	—	—	—	—		Hard Core Poetry
1974	"She's Gone"	50	1	—	—	—	96	—	—	—	—		Hard Core Poetry
1975	"Remember What I Told You to Forget" (A-side)	25	4	—	—	—	46	—	—	—	—		Hard Core Poetry
1975	"My Ship" (B-side)	25	—	—	—	—	—	—	—	—	—		Hard Core Poetry
1975	"It Only Takes a Minute"	10	1	2	—	—	17	—	—	—	—		In the City
1975	"Free Ride"	52	8	—	—	—	71	—	—	—	—		In the City
1976	"The Love I Never Had"	—	11	—	—	—	—	—	—	—	—		In the City
1976	"Heaven Must Be Missing an Angel"	15	3	1	18	30	11	9	1	30	4	RIAA: Gold; BPI: Silver	Sky High!
1976	"Don't Take Away the Music"	34	14	1	—	—	48	7	5	—	4	BPI: Silver	Sky High!
1977	"The Mighty Power of Love"	—	—	—	—	—	—	—	—	—	25		Sky High!
1977	"Whodunit"	22	1	—	31	32	15	—	7	3	5		Love Storm
1977	"One Step Away"	—	—	—	—	—	—	—	—	—	16		Love Storm
1977	"Goodnight My Love"	—	14	—	—	—	—	—	—	—	—		Love Storm
1977	"More Than a Woman"	32	36	—	—	—	29	—	34	—	7		Future Bound
1978	"The Ghost of Love"	—	48	—	—	—	—	—	—	—	29		Future Bound
1978	"Timber"	—	94	—	—	—	—	—	—	—	—		Future Bound
1978	"Slow Train to Paradise"	—	—	—	—	—	—	18	—	—	62		Future Bound
1978	"Never Had a Love Like This Before"	—	5	—	—	—	—	—	—	—	—		Madam Butterfly
1979	"Straight from Your Heart"	—	77	—	—	—	—	—	—	—	—		Madam Butterfly
1979	"Bad Times"	47	10	—	—	—	—	—	—	—	—		Supercharged
1980	"I Can't Go on Living Without You"	—	42	—	—	—	—	—	—	—	—		Supercharged
1980	"Love Uprising"	—	17	—	—	—	—	—	—	—	—		Love Uprising
1981	"Loneliness"	—	64	—	—	—	—	—	—	—	—		Love Uprising
1981	"Turn Out the Nightlight"	—	45	—	—	—	—	—	—	—	—		Loveline
1981	"Loveline"	—	47	—	—	—	—	—	—	—	—		Loveline
1982	"A Penny for Your Thoughts"	33	16	—	15	60	—	—	45	17	—		New Directions
1983	"Got to Find My Way Back to You"	—	24	—	—	—	—	—	—	—	—		New Directions
1983	"Deeper in Love"	—	10	41	—	—	—	—	—	—	—		Words and Music
1983	"Words and Music"	—	29	—	—	—	—	—	—	—	—		Words and Music
1985	"Heaven Must Be Missing an Angel (Remix by Ben Liebrand)"	—	—	—	—	—	—	8	11	—	12		—N/a
1985	"Don't Take Away the Music (Hands off the Music Mix)"	—	—	—	—	—	—	—	48	—	—		—N/a
1986	"It Only Takes a Minute (Remix by Ben Liebrand)"	—	—	—	—	—	—	—	—	—	46		—N/a
"—" denotes a recording that did not chart or was not released in that territory.

== Awards and honors ==
Grammy Awards:

Year	Nominated work	Award	Result
1979	Saturday Night Fever soundtrack	Album of the Year	Won
1982	"A Penny for Your Thoughts"	Best R&B Performance by a Duo or Group with Vocal	Nominated

- Inducted into the Cape Verdean Museum Hall of Fame (2006)
- Lifetime Achievement Award by The National R&B Music Society (2013)
- Inducted into the Rhode Island Music Hall of Fame (2014)
- Griffin Court in New Bedford, MA, renamed Tavares Brothers' Way (2024)

== See also ==
- List of number-one dance hits (United States)
- List of artists who reached number one on the US Dance chart
