= A Penny for Your Thoughts (song) =

Single by Tavares

from the album New Directions
- B-side: "The Skin You're In"
- Released: September 1982
- Genre: Soul
- Length: 3:52
- Label: RCA
- Songwriter: Kenny Nolan
- Producers: Jay Senter, Kenny Nolan

Tavares singles chronology
"Loveline" (1981)	"A Penny for Your Thoughts" (1982)	"Got to Find My Way Back to You" (1983)

"A Penny for Your Thoughts" is a song by R&B/disco group Tavares in 1982, originally recorded by Marion Jarvis in 1975. It was written by Kenny Nolan.

Released from their 1982 album New Directions, the song became Tavares's eighth and final US top 40 hit, peaking at number 33 on the US Billboard Hot 100 singles chart and number 28 on the Cash Box Top 100.

Unlike all of their bigger hits, "A Penny for Your Thoughts" did not chart in Canada. Three collections of the group's work were issued during the early 2000s by Capitol Records, however, because of their label change to RCA the song was not included among their other hits.

The B-side of the 45, "The Skin You're In", was also written by Nolan. "A Penny for Your Thoughts" was his ninth of 10 compositions to become U.S. chart hits. Ten years later Atlantic Starr would reach the Top 10 with Nolan's song, "Masterpiece."

At the 25th Annual Grammy Awards "A Penny For Your Thoughts" received a nomination for Best R&B Performance By A Duo or Group With Vocal.

== Charts ==
Chart (1982–1983)	Peak position
Australia	60
Netherlands	45
New Zealand	17
US Billboard Hot 100	33
US Adult Contemporary	15
US R&B singles	16
US Cash Box Top 100	28
