= Eddie Kendricks =

American singer and songwriter (1939–1992)

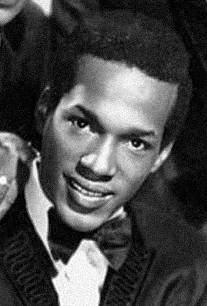
- Kendricks in 1964

Background information
- Born: Edward James Kendrick; December 17, 1939; Union Springs, Alabama, U.S.
- Origin: Ensley, Alabama, U.S.
- Died: October 5, 1992 (aged 52) Birmingham, Alabama, U.S.
- Genres: R&B; soul; disco; psychedelic soul
- Occupations: Singer; songwriter
- Instrument: Vocals
- Years active: 1955–1992
- Labels: Motown; Tamla; Arista; Atlantic; RCA
- Formerly of: The Temptations

Edward James Kendrick (December 17, 1939 – October 5, 1992), better known as Eddie Kendricks, was an American tenor singer and songwriter. Noted for his distinctive falsetto singing style, Kendricks co-founded the Motown singing group the Temptations, and was one of their lead singers from 1961 until 1971. He was the lead voice on such famous songs as "The Way You Do the Things You Do", "Get Ready", and "Just My Imagination (Running Away with Me)". As a solo artist, Kendricks recorded several hits of his own during the 1970s including the number-one single "Keep On Truckin'" and the number-two single "Boogie Down."

== Life and career ==
=== Early years: 1939–1960 ===
Edward James Kendrick, who was of African American heritage, was born to Johnny and Lee Bell Kendrick in Union Springs, Alabama on December 17, 1939. He had one sister, Patricia, and three brothers, Charles, Robert, and Clarence. Kendricks and his family moved to the Ensley neighborhood of Birmingham, where he met and began singing with his best friend Paul Williams in their church choir in the late 1940s. In 1955, Kendricks, Williams, as well as their friends Kell Osborne and Willy Waller, formed a doo-wop group called the Cavaliers and they began performing around Birmingham. The group decided to move for better opportunities in their musical careers, and in 1957, the group moved to Cleveland, Ohio living on E. 123rd Street and Kinsman Road. In Cleveland, they met manager Milton Jenkins, and soon moved with Jenkins to Detroit where the Cavaliers renamed themselves the Primes. Under Jenkins' management, the Primes were successful in the Detroit area, eventually creating a female spin-off group called the Primettes (later becoming the Supremes). In 1961, Osbourne moved to California, and the Primes disbanded. Kendricks and Paul Williams joined forces with members Elbridge “Al” Bryant in addition to Otis Williams and Melvin "Blue" Franklin from Otis Williams and the Distants after two members quit. They became the Elgins; on the same day the group changed their name to the Temptations and signed to Motown.

=== The Temptations: 1961–1971 ===
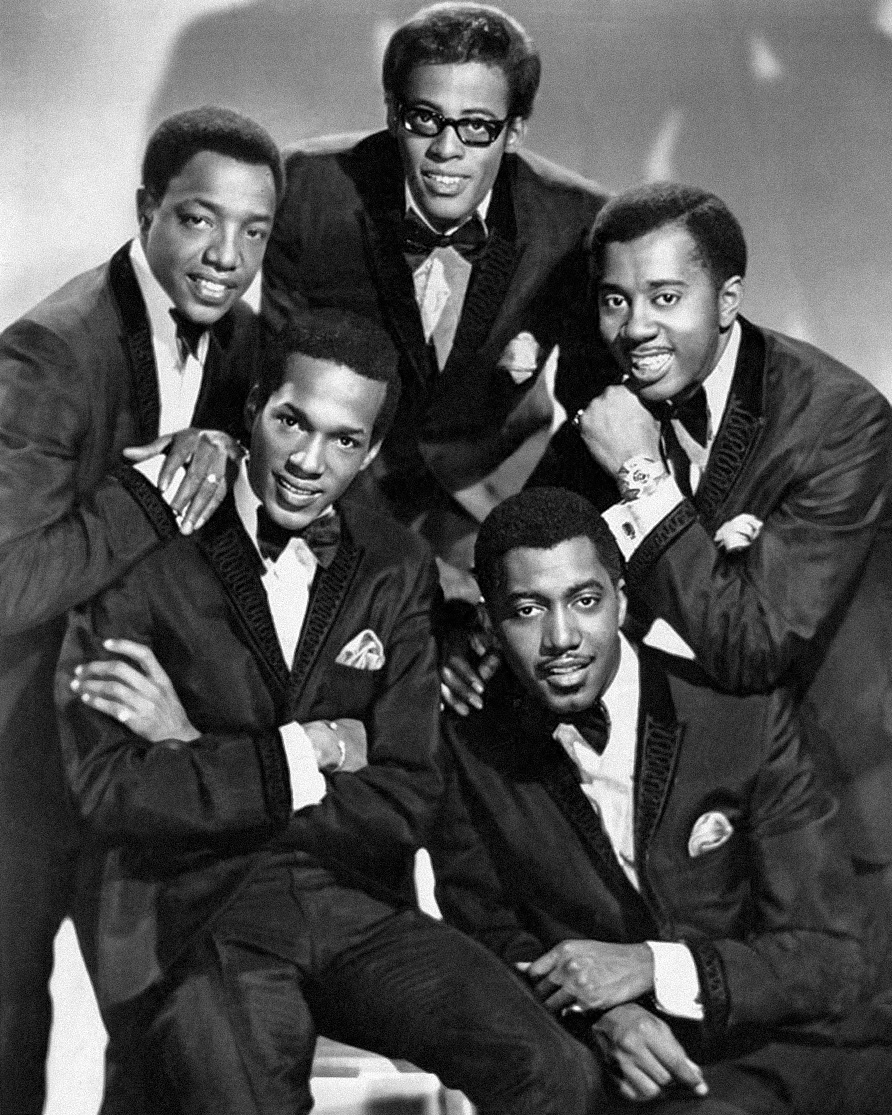
The Temptations in 1964, with Kendricks at left, seated.

The Temptations began singing background for Mary Wells. After an initial dry period, the Temptations quickly became the most successful male vocal group of the 1960s. Although technically Kendricks was first tenor in the group's harmony, he often sang in the falsetto register. Among the Temptations songs, Kendricks sang lead on were "Dream Come True" (1962), the group's first charting single; "The Way You Do the Things You Do" (1964), the group's first US Top 20 hit; "I'll Be in Trouble" (1964); "The Girl's Alright With Me" (1964), a popular B-side that Kendricks co-wrote; "Girl (Why You Wanna Make Me Blue)" (1964); "Get Ready" (1966); "Please Return Your Love to Me" (1968); and "Just My Imagination" (1971). He was also allowed to sing a few leads in his lower registers such as "May I Have This Dance" (1962). He shared lead vocal duty on other records, including "You're My Everything" (1967) (shared with David Ruffin), and a long string of Norman Whitfield produced psychedelic soul records where all five Temptations sang lead, such as the Grammy winner "Cloud Nine" (1968), "I Can't Get Next to You" (1969), and "Ball of Confusion" (1970). He also leads on "I'm Gonna Make You Love Me" (1968), a popular duet with Diana Ross and the Supremes, and on the Temptations' version of the Christmas classic "Rudolph the Red-Nosed Reindeer" (1968).

In the Temptations, Kendricks was responsible for creating most of the group's vocal arrangements, and also served as wardrobe manager, including the now famous purple suits the group wore for one performance. Though Whitfield had chief responsibility for writing, Kendricks co-wrote and received credit for several Temptations songs apart from "The Girl's Alright With Me" including "Isn't She Pretty" (1961) and "Don't Send Me Away" (1967). His favorite food was cornbread, and as a result, Kendricks was nicknamed "Cornbread" (or "Corn" for short) by his band mates. According to Otis Williams, Kendricks romantically pursued Diana Ross, lead singer of the Supremes, and he was said to have been close friends with Martha Reeves of the Vandellas. In her second book, Supreme Faith, Supremes singer Mary Wilson writes that she and Kendricks were lovers "briefly," but remained close friends.

Kendricks remained in the group through the rest of the decade, but a number of issues began to push him away from it in the late 1960s and early 1970s. He was uncomfortable with singing the psychedelic style that Whitfield was now crafting for the group as opposed to the romantic ballads they had sung under the direction of Smokey Robinson, his friend Paul Williams was often too ill to perform with the group, and Kendricks often found himself at odds with bandmates Otis Williams and Melvin Franklin. As he grew away from the group, Kendricks began to rekindle his friendship with ex-Temptation David Ruffin, who convinced him to leave.

In a 1991 interview with a Chicago television series called Urban Street, Kendricks said he had actually considered leaving the group as early as 1965, even though that was when the band was finally starting to take off, because of things that "weren't quite proper." Kendricks explained that they were working with people that "didn't have their best interests at heart." However, he initially decided to stay in the group because Kendricks worried that he would not get the support he needed if he left. Kendricks also said that his relationship with Berry Gordy was less than cordial. He stated: "Berry Gordy is a man I don't know, I only met him about three times," and added, "I know he didn't particularly care for me." Kendricks stated that he did not agree with many decisions that were made.

After one final altercation with Williams and Franklin during a run at the Copacabana nightclub in November 1970, Kendricks walked off after the first night and did not return, and it was mutually decided he would leave the group. While working on his first solo album, Kendricks recorded one last hit single with the Temptations, 1971's "Just My Imagination (Running Away with Me)". By the time the record reached number one on the US Billboard Hot 100 in April 1971, Kendricks had signed a solo deal with Motown's Tamla division and was preparing the release of his first solo album, All By Myself. However, many of his problems with Motown would reoccur.

=== Solo career and later years: 1971–1992 ===
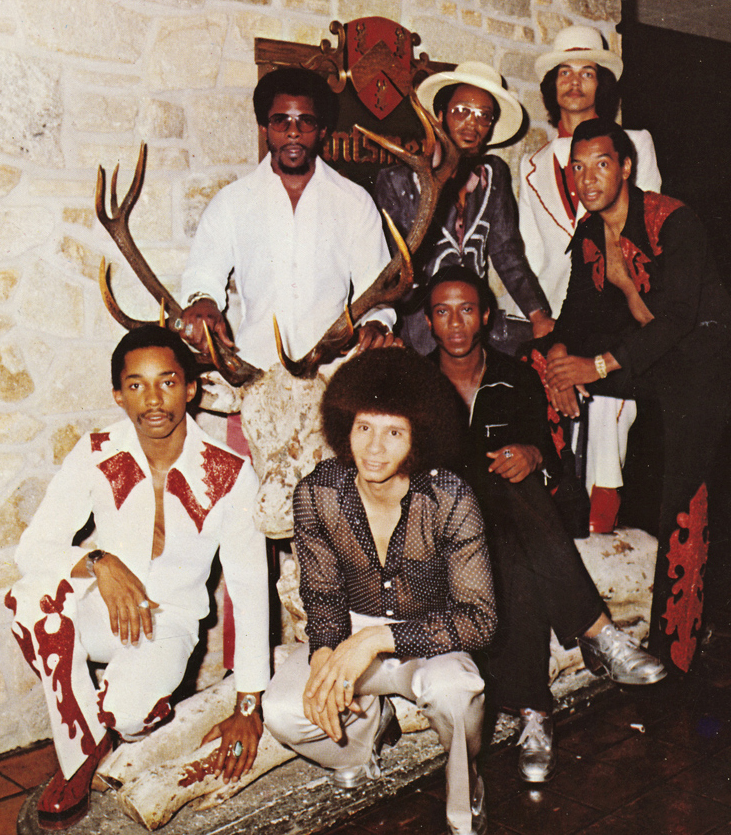
The Young Senators, who toured with Kendricks and played on People...Hold On.

Kendricks' solo career began slowly; he endured two years of singles that missed the Top 40, while the Temptations continued with their string of Norman Whitfield-helmed hits (one of which, "Superstar (Remember How You Got Where You Are)", was written as a jab towards Kendricks and Ruffin). Despite enjoying only a modicum of commercial success and radio airplay, Kendricks' 1972 album People... Hold On (recorded with his touring group, the Young Senators, composed of Jimi Dougans, Frank Hooker, LeRoy Fleming, Wornell Jones, David Lecraft, James Drummer Johnson, and John Engram) was a cornerstone of DJ playlists in downtown New York's nascent disco scene. The expansive, eight-minute take on "Girl You Need a Change of Mind", which peaked at number 13 on the soul chart, was a particular favorite at David Mancuso's Loft. The single was later remade by R&B singer D'Angelo for the Get on the Bus soundtrack.

As the dance craze seeped through into other cities, Kendricks scored a number one pop hit in 1973 with the Frank Wilson-produced "Keep on Truckin'", becoming the only member of the Temptations to register a number one hit in the U.S. as a solo artist. As well as reaching number 18 in the UK, it sold over one million copies, and was awarded a gold disc.

Further hits included 1974's "Boogie Down" (US number 2, UK number 39) and another million selling release, "Son of Sagittarius" (US number 28) from the same year, 1975's "Shoeshine Boy" (US number 18), and 1976's "He's a Friend" (US number 36). Another notable song is "Intimate Friends" (1977), which was sampled for the Alicia Keys song "Unbreakable", "A Penny for My Thoughts" by Common, Sparkle's "Time to Move on" on her self-titled first studio album, and for Sweet Sable's "Old Time's Sake" from the soundtrack for the 1994 2pac film, Above the Rim. Erykah Badu also sampled "Intimate Friends" for her song "Fall in Love (Your Funeral)", as well as his song "My People... Hold on" for her song "My People" on her album New Amerykah Part One (4th World War).

Exasperated by a lack of creative and financial control, Kendricks left Motown in 1978. He moved first to Arista Records and later to Atlantic Records. By this time, his popularity had waned. Kendricks was also gradually losing his upper range as a result of chain smoking.

Kendricks and Ruffin rejoined the Temptations for a well-received 1982 reunion tour. The group, then a seven-piece act, also recorded a reunion album, and enjoyed a hit with the Rick James-written-and-produced "Standing on the Top". Kendricks sang a few lead lines on the song, but had no leads on any other tracks. In an interview with Tom Meros, Dennis Edwards, Kendricks' former Temptations bandmate, claimed Kendricks had problems hitting the higher notes during recording sessions. Because of his singing difficulty, Edwards said Kendricks went to a physician to examine his vocal ability. The physician discovered a "pin drop" of cancer on one of his lungs. However, Kendricks reportedly refused to undergo chemotherapy at the time because he feared losing his hair.

Ruffin and Kendrick (Kendricks dropped the "s" from his stage name during the 1980s) reportedly met up one night when Ruffin went to watch Kendrick perform in a nightclub; Kendrick spotted Ruffin in the crowd, pointed him out, and invited him to come up and perform with him. Afterward they talked about touring on their own and recorded an album as a duo for RCA in 1988.

Earlier, in 1985, they participated in the Hall & Oates live album, Live at The Apollo, recorded at a benefit at New York City's Apollo Theater; and sang with the duo at Live Aid in Philadelphia and the MTV Video Music Awards in New York. Hall & Oates have cited Kendrick and Ruffin specifically, and the Temptations in general, as a major influence. Ruffin started touring with Kendrick as a duo act in 1985. The live medley of "The Way You Do the Things You Do" and "My Girl" was released as a single, reaching number 20 on the Billboard Hot 100, number 12 on the Adult Contemporary chart, and number 40 on the R&B chart. The single earned them a Grammy nomination.

In 1989, Kendrick, Ruffin, and their Temptations bandmates were inducted into the Rock and Roll Hall of Fame. There, Kendrick and Ruffin made plans with fellow former Temptation Dennis Edwards to tour and record as "Ruffin/Kendrick/Edwards, Former Leads of the Temptations". The Ruffin/Kendrick/Edwards project was cut short in 1991, when Kendrick was diagnosed with lung cancer and David Ruffin died of a drug overdose. However, Kendrick and Edwards continued to tour for the remainder of 1991. After having surgery in late 1991, Kendricks resumed touring through the summer of 1992.

== Death ==
In late 1991, Kendricks, by now living in his native Birmingham, Alabama, underwent surgery to have one of his lungs removed in the hope of preventing the spread of cancer. Kendricks believed the disease was caused by his 30 years of smoking. Kendricks continued to tour through the summer of 1992, when he fell ill again and was hospitalized.

On October 5, 1992, Kendricks died of lung cancer at Baptist Medical Center-Princeton in Birmingham; he was 52 years old. Kendricks was survived by his three children: Parris, Aika, and Paul Kendricks (named after Paul Williams). A funeral service was held at the First Baptist Church in Ensley, Alabama and Kendricks was buried in Elmwood Cemetery, Birmingham. Friends and fans paid tribute to him at four concerts, held at the Strand in Los Angeles, on October 16 and October 17, 1992. Performers including Bobby Womack, Chaka Khan, Mary Wilson, and Vesta Willams sang Temptations songs, as well as some of their own.

== Legacy ==
Kendricks was nominated for four Grammy Awards, winning one for "Cloud Nine" with the Temptations in 1969. The Temptations received the Grammy Lifetime Achievement Award in 2013. In 1998, NBC aired The Temptations, a four-hour television miniseries based upon an autobiographical book by Otis Williams. Kendricks was portrayed by actor Terron Brooks.

On October 16, 1999, Eddie Kendrick Memorial Park, located on the corner of 18th Street and 4th Avenue North in Birmingham, was dedicated. The park uses Kendricks' family name without the "s". The memorial features a bronze sculpture of Kendricks by local artist Ron McDowell as well as sculptures of the other Temptations, set into a granite wall. Inscribed on the granite are the names of Temptations' hit songs. Recorded music can be heard throughout the park, featuring songs by Kendricks and the Temptations.

In 1989, Kendricks was inducted into the Rock and Roll Hall of Fame as a member of the Temptations. Rapper Kendrick Lamar was named after Kendricks. In 2019, Kendricks was inducted as a solo artist into the National Rhythm & Blues Hall of Fame.

== Discography ==
=== Albums ===
Year	Album	Peak chart positions			Certifications
Year	Album	US	US R&B	UK	Certifications
1971	All by Myself: Released: April 1971; Label: Tamla (Motown)	80	6	—	
1972	People ... Hold On: Released: May 1972; Label: Tamla	131	13	—	
1973	Eddie Kendricks: Released: May 1973; Label: Tamla	18	5	—	
1974	Boogie Down!: Released: February 1974; Label: Tamla	30	1	—	
1974	For You: Released: December 1974; Label: Tamla	108	8	—	
1975	The Hit Man: Released: July 1975; Label: Tamla	63	9	—	
1976	He's a Friend: Released: February 1976; Label: Tamla	38	3	—	
1976	Goin' Up in Smoke: Released: September 1976; Label: Tamla	114	22	—	
1977	Slick: Released: August 1977; Label: Tamla	—	47	—	
1978	Vintage '78: Released: April 1978; Label: Arista	180	33	—	
1979	Something More: Released: 1979; Label: Arista	—	68	—	
1981	Love Keys: Released: 1981; Label: Atlantic	—	62	—	
1983	I've Got My Eyes on You: Released: 1983; Label: Ms. Dixie	—	—	—	
1985	Live at the Apollo (with David Ruffin, Daryl Hall & John Oates): Released: September 1985; Label: RCA	21	41	32	RIAA: Gold
1987	Ruffin & Kendrick (with David Ruffin): Released: 1987; Label: RCA	—	60	—	
"—" denotes an album that was not released in that territory or did not chart

=== Singles ===
Year	Title	Peak chart positions				Certifications	Album
Year	Title	US	US R&B	US Dance	UK	Certifications	Album
1971	"It's So Hard for Me to Say Goodbye"	88	37	—	—		All by Myself
1971	"Can I?"	—	37	—	—		All by Myself
1972	"Eddie's Love"	77	35	—	—		People ... Hold On
1972	"If You Let Me"	66	17	—	—		People ... Hold On
1972	"Girl, You Need a Change of Mind (Part 1)"	87	13	—	—		People ... Hold On
1973	"Darling, Come Back Home"	67	26	—	—		Eddie Kendricks
1973	"Keep on Truckin' (Part 1)"	1	1	—	18	RIAA: Gold	Eddie Kendricks
1973	"Boogie Down"	2	1	—	39	RIAA: Gold	Boogie Down
1974	"Son of Sagittarius"	28	5	—	—		Boogie Down
1974	"Tell Her Love Has Felt the Need"	50	8	—	—		Boogie Down
1974	"One Tear"	71	8	—	—		For You
1975	"Shoeshine Boy"	18	1	—	—		For You
1975	"Get the Cream Off the Top"	50	7	—	—		The Hit Man
1975	"Happy"	66	8	—	—		The Hit Man
1976	"He's a Friend"	36	2	—	—		He's a Friend
1976	"Get It While It's Hot"	—	24	—	—		He's a Friend
1976	"Goin' Up in Smoke"	—	30	11	—		Goin' Up in Smoke
1976	"Born Again"	—	—	—	—		Goin' Up in Smoke
1977	"Intimate Friends"	—	24	—	—		Slick
1978	"Ain't No Smoke Without Fire"	—	13	20	—		Vintage '78
1978	"The Best of Strangers Now"	—	58	—	—		Vintage '78
1979	"Your Love Has Been So Good to Me"	—	—	—	—		Something More
1979	"I Just Want to Be the One in Your Life"	—	87	—	—		Something More
1981	"(Oh I) Need Your Loving"	—	41	—	—		Love Keys
1981	"I Don't Need Nobody Else"	—	—	—	—		Love Keys
1983	"I'm in Love with You"	—	—	—	—		I've Got My Eyes on You
1984	"Surprise Attack"	—	87	—	—		—N/a
1985	"A Night at the Apollo Live!" (with David Ruffin, Daryl Hall & John Oates)	20	40	—	58		Live at the Apollo
1987	"I Couldn't Believe It" (with David Ruffin)	—	14	—	85		Ruffin & Kendrick
1987	"One More for the Lonely Hearts Club" (with David Ruffin)	—	43	—	—		Ruffin & Kendrick
"—" denotes a single that was not released in that territory or did not chart
