= Heaven Must Be Missing an Angel =

1976 single by Tavares

Single by Tavares

from the album Sky High!
- A-side: "Heaven Must Be Missing an Angel" (Part 1)
- B-side: "Heaven Must Be Missing an Angel" (Part 2)
- Released: May 1976; February 1986 (re-release)
- Genre: Disco; R&B
- Length: 6:47 (album version); 3:28 (single version 1); 3:10 (single version 2)
- Label: Capitol
- Songwriters: Freddie Perren; Keni St. Lewis
- Producer: Freddie Perren

Tavares singles chronology
"Free Ride" (1975)	"Heaven Must Be Missing an Angel" (1976)	"Don't Take Away the Music" (1976)

Alternative release(s)
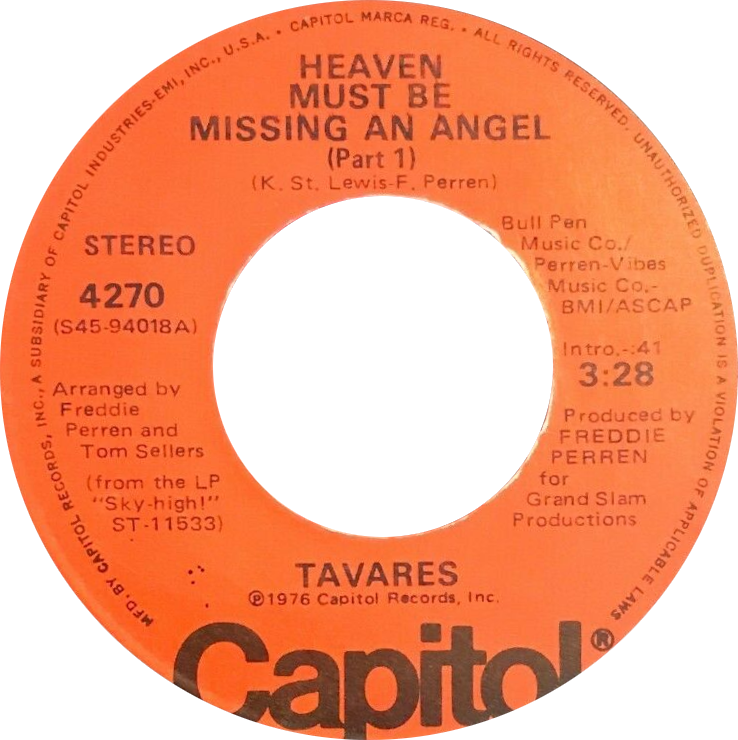
- Side A of US single

Music video
- "Heaven Must Be Missing An Angel" (1976) • TopPop on YouTube

"Heaven Must Be Missing an Angel" is a disco song written by Freddie Perren and Keni St. Lewis. It was recorded by the American band Tavares in 1976. It was released as the first single from their fourth album, Sky High! (1976), and was split into two parts: the first part was 3 minutes and 28 seconds in length, while the second part was 3 minutes and 10 seconds. "Heaven Must Be Missing an Angel" was re-released in February 1986.

"Heaven Must Be Missing an Angel" reached number 15 on the Billboard Hot 100 chart in 1976. It peaked at number three on the Hot Soul Singles chart. "Heaven Must Be Missing an Angel", with the track "Don't Take Away the Music", spent two weeks at number one on the Hot Dance Club Play chart. It became the group's only Gold record.

The song would also afford the group an international chart hit, reaching number one in the Netherlands, and charting in Australia (30), Canada (11), the UK (4), and South Africa (16).

In 2000, Italian a cappella group Neri per Caso released an Italian language version of the song, titled Sarà (Heaven Must Be Missing an Angel).

== Charts ==
=== Weekly charts ===
Chart (1976)	Peak position
Australia (Kent Music Report)	30
Belgium (Ultratop)	2
Canada Top Singles (RPM)	11
France (French Singles Chart)	7
Ireland (IRMA)	9
Italy (Musica e dischi)	17
Netherlands (Dutch Top 40)	1
Netherlands (Single Top 100)	1
Mexico (Mexican Singles Chart)	5
New Zealand (RIANZ)	30
South Africa (Springbok)	16
UK Singles (OCC)	4
US Billboard Hot 100	15
US Hot Dance Club Play (Billboard)	1
US Hot Soul Singles (Billboard)	3
US Adult Contemporary (Billboard)	18
US Cash Box Top 100	10

=== Year-end charts ===
Chart (1976)	Rank
Canada Top Singles (RPM)	114
UK Singles (OCC)	37
US Billboard Hot 100	60
US (Joel Whitburn's Pop Annual)	118
US Cash Box Top 100	33

== See also ==
- List of Dutch Top 40 number-one singles of 1976
