= Kathleen Wakefield =

- Born: Kathleen Rae Wakefield; Northeast Arizona, United States
- Genres: Pop, R&B, jazz, soul
- Occupations: Songwriter; lyricist; author
- Years active: 1960s–present
- Labels: Motown, A&M Records, Warner/Chappell Music, EMI, Sony Music
- Website: Official website

Kathleen Rae "Kathy" Wakefield is an American songwriter, singer and fiction author known for co-writing the Supremes' 1971 Motown hit single "Nathan Jones", later used as a soundtrack for the film Rain Man (1988). She also co-wrote the Grammy-winning song "One Hundred Ways".

== Personal life and education ==
Kathleen Rae Wakefield grew up in the Seattle area and attended the University of Washington. She divides her time between Los Angeles and Seattle, having previously lived part-time in London.

== Career ==
She began her musical career singing in the 1960s with Dotty Harmony, performing as Dotty and Kathy. They released the pop single "The Prince of My Dreams," which was written by David Gates. Her first song, "Stand Tall," was co-written with Dotty Harmony and recorded by The O'Jays. Prior to her career in music, she was a showgirl at the Tropicana Hotel in Las Vegas, Nevada.

In 1970, Wakefield co-wrote the song "Feelin' Kinda Sunday" with Nino Tempo and Annette Tucker, which was recorded as a single by Frank Sinatra and his daughter Nancy. She also co-wrote "There Will Come a Day" with Mike and Brenda Sutton, recorded by Smokey Robinson, and released in 1977 by Motown on the album Deep in My Soul.

With Leonard Caston, she wrote The Four Tops' 1972 single "I Can't Quit Your Love". The Jackson 5 would later record a cover version on their 1973 album Skywriter. In 1973, she created the song "Darling Come Back Home" with Frank Wilson and King Errisson and produced by Wilson and Leonard Caston for Motown's Eddie Kendricks album.

In 1983, she co-wrote with Michael Jackson and Paul Anka the song "Love Never Felt So Good." It was finally released in 1984 by Johnny Mathis. The original demo version was leaked onto the Internet in 2006 as one of Jackson's unreleased songs and was released on the Xscape album as a demo, mixed version, and duet with Justin Timberlake. She and Jackie Jackson co-wrote "Torture," with lead vocals performed by Jermaine and Michael Jackson and released in 1984.

She also worked as a writer with Motown's Diana Ross and The Temptations, as well as Lamont Dozier, Oleta Adams, Kenny Rankin, Caston & Majors, Bananarama, and Stephen Bishop. For the label A&M Records, she co-wrote an album with Michel Colombier for Herb Alpert.

"One Hundred Ways," co-written by Wakefield, Benjamin Wright, and Tony Coleman, was performed by James Ingram and produced by Quincy Jones for James's debut album, The Dude. It debuted in December 1981 in the Top 40's "Hot 100."

=== Books ===
Wakefield's first book, a novella titled Snaketown, was published in 2010 by Cleveland State University Poetry Center. Her second book, In The Foam Of The Blue Waves, was released by Pen and Brush in October 2015.

=== Awards ===
"One Hundred Ways" received the 1982 Grammy Award for Best R&B Vocal Performance.

Wakefield's novella, Snaketown, released by Cleveland State University Poetry Center, received an award in the 2007 Ruthanne Wiley Memorial Novella Competition.

The novella also received an honorable mention from the University of Utah's literary 2006-2007 Quarterly West Novella Competition.
