= Leonard Caston Jr. =

American R&B songwriter, record producer, pianist and singer (born 1943)

- Born: November 13, 1943 (age 82); Chicago, U.S.
- Genre: Rhythm and blues
- Occupations: Songwriter, record producer, musician

Leonard Caston Jr. (born November 13, 1943) is an American rhythm and blues songwriter, record producer, pianist and singer. He recorded for both the Chess and Motown labels in the 1960s and 1970s, and co-wrote or co-produced several major hit records, including Mitty Collier's "I Had A Talk With My Man" (1964), The Supremes' "Nathan Jones" (1971), Eddie Kendricks' "Keep On Truckin'" (1973) and "Boogie Down" (1974).

== Biography ==
Caston was born in Chicago, the son of blues musician Leonard "Baby Doo" Caston. After spending some time in the US Army, in 1964 he joined Maurice McAlister, a fellow member of the Greater Harvest Church, in his vocal group, The Radiants. The group recorded for the Chess label (for whom Caston's father also recorded), and while working at the label Caston co-wrote, with Billy Davis, new words for James Cleveland's gospel song, "I Had A Talk With God Last Night". Recorded by Mitty Collier with secular lyrics as "I Had A Talk With My Man", it became a hit single (no. 41 on the Billboard Hot 100) in late 1964. Caston left the Radiants in 1965, after their first two hit singles, "Voice Your Choice" and "It Ain't No Big Thing", and began working as a session musician, songwriter and producer at Chess. He played piano on Fontella Bass' hit "Rescue Me", and also worked with singers Bobby McClure, Jan Bradley and Laura Lee. He returned to work with the Radiants in 1967, writing and producing their final hit, "Hold On".

== Motown years ==
Caston left Chess in 1968, and joined Motown Records in Detroit, where he worked with songwriter Kathy Wakefield, and writer and producer Frank Wilson. He co-wrote "Nathan Jones" with Wakefield; the song was recorded by The Supremes, produced by Wilson, and rose to #16 on the Hot 100 in 1971. Caston then worked with co-producer Wilson and co-writer Anita Poree to revive the career of ex-Temptations lead singer Eddie Kendricks. He co-wrote "Girl You Need a Change of Mind", and co-wrote, co-produced and played keyboards on "Keep On Truckin''" and "Boogie Down", which both reached no. 1 on the Billboard Soul chart in 1973-74. He also co-wrote and co-produced several of Kendricks' later albums and singles for Motown. Several of his songs were recorded by other artists, including the Four Tops, Stevie Wonder, and the Jackson 5, and he was nominated for a Grammy in 1975.

While at Motown, Caston also met, and later married, singer Carolyn Majors. They signed a contract as a recording duo, and, as Caston & Majors, recorded a gospel tinged self-titled album in 1974. The album was not a commercial success in the United States but contained the track "I'll Keep My Light In My Window", co-written by Caston with Terri McFaddin, which was later recorded by Diana Ross and Marvin Gaye, the Temptations, Ben Vereen, and in a Grammy-winning recording by the Mighty Clouds of Joy, among others. In the UK, 'Child of Love' was released as a single reaching a position of #55 in April 1975. A second Caston & Majors album was shelved, finally seeing the light of day in 2013 as part of a reissue of their Motown work. The duo left the company in 1977.

In 1979, he co-wrote and co-produced two tracks on Minnie Riperton's last album, Love Lives Forever, released after her death.

== Gospel years ==
Caston and Majors later moved to California, where they worked together as pastors with the Christian Life Assembly in the Los Angeles area. In 1999, the couple moved to Harrisburg, Pennsylvania, where Caston became the Minister of Music of the Dayspring Ministries church, and established My-Lyn Music. They also continued to work with Frank Wilson, who had become a born again Christian minister. In 2002, Caston won a Billboard BMI Urban Music Award, and in 2004 he co-produced, with Billy Davis, the album 19 Days in New York by Australian singer Kate Ceberano. In 2008 he produced an album by Pennsylvania gospel singer and songwriter Dana Fields.
